= List of organizations that self-identify as Native American tribes =

These organizations, located within the United States, self-identify as Native American tribes, heritage groups, or descendant communities, but they are not federally recognized or state-recognized as Native American tribes. The U.S. Governmental Accountability Office states: "Non-federally recognized tribes fall into two distinct categories: (1) state-recognized tribes that are not also federally recognized and (2) other groups that self-identify as Indian tribes but are neither federally nor state recognized." The following list includes the latter.

For organizations that are recognized by the government of the United States as Native American tribes and tribal nations, see List of federally recognized tribes in the contiguous United States and List of Alaska Native tribal entities. For groups that are recognized by state governments as Native American tribes, see State-recognized tribes in the United States.

Many of these organizations are not accepted as being Native American by established Native American tribes. Exceptions exist, including tribes whose previous recognition was terminated, especially in California under the California Rancheria Termination Acts. Certain historic tribes in California signed treaties in 1851 and 1852 that the U.S. Senate secretly rejected after being pressured by the state of California; many of these historic tribes remain unrecognized.

The following groups claim to be of Native American, which includes American Indian and Alaska Native, or Métis heritage by ethnicity but have no federal recognition through the United States Department of the Interior, Bureau of Indian Affairs Office of Federal Acknowledgment, United States Department of the Interior Office of the Solicitor, and are not recognized by any state government in the United States.

Some of the organizations are regarded as fraudulent. Some organizations are described as Corporations Posing as Indigenous Nations (CPAIN).

Non-recognized tribes is a term for "groups that have no federal designation and are not accepted as sovereign entities under U.S. law", which includes state-recognized tribes. "An additional sub-designation under this classification are 'Federally Non-Recognized' tribes, which includes groups that have previously held federal recognition, either under governments prior to the U.S. Federal Government or as Nations that are no longer in existence and/or no longer meet the criteria as a Nation to have sovereignty status."

Indigenous communities in the Pacific such as Native Hawaiians, Samoan Americans, Chamorro people of Guam, and Indigenous peoples of the Northern Mariana Islands are classified as Pacific Indigenous Communities and are not organized into tribes.

== Caribbean ==
This list also includes some groups from non-sovereign U.S. territories outside the contiguous United States, especially Puerto Rico and the Virgin Islands, that identify as having Caribbean Indigenous heritage and which also lack formal recognition. Groups outside the 48 contiguous states and Alaska are currently ineligible for federal recognition. (Note: The federal government states in the context of recognizing American Indigenous tribes that "Indigenous means native to the continental United States in that at least part of the petitioner's territory at the time of first sustained contact extended into what is now the continental United States". The continental U.S. is defined as "the contiguous 48 states and Alaska". The Tlinga and Haida Indian Tribes of Alaska outline the law as such: "In 1934, the Indian Reorganization Act (IRA) was passed to set a standard for the federal government to recognize tribes in the Lower 48. The Alaska Native Brotherhood petitioned Congress to amend the IRA to apply to Alaska, and in 1936 the revision was made.") Some of these groups are represented on the International Indian Treaty Council under the United Confederation of Taíno People, which has campaigned nationally and at the United Nations for the United States to recognize such groups.

== List of groups self-identifying as American Indian tribes ==
Following is a list of groups known to self-identify as Native American tribes but that are not recognized by the U.S. federal government (Bureau of Indian Affairs) or by any state government.

=== Alabama ===
1. Cherokee Nation of Alabama. Letter of Intent to Petition 02/16/1999.
2. Cherokee River Indian Community, Moulton, AL. Letter of Intent to Petition 08/03/2000. Receipt of Petition 08/03/2000.
3. Chickamauga Cherokee of Alabama.
4. Chickmaka Band of the South Cumberland Plateau.
5. Coweta Creek Tribe, Phenix City, AL. Letter of Intent to Petition 2/12/2003.
6. Eagle Bear Band of Free Cherokees.
7. The Langley Band of the Chickamogee Cherokee Indians of the Southeastern United States, aka Langley Band of Chickamogee of Cherokee Indians, Birmingham, AL Letter of Intent to Petition 04/20/1994; Postal service certified letter returned 11/5/1997.
8. Phoenician Cherokee II – Eagle Tribe of Sequoyah, Gadsden, AL Letter of Intent to Petition 09/18/2001.
9. Powhatan Nation of American Indians, Enterprise, AL
10. Principal Creek Indian Nation East of the Mississippi, Florala, AL. Letter of Intent to Petition 11/09/1971. Declined to Acknowledge 06/10/1985 50 FR 14302; certified letter returned "not known" 10/1997.
11. Wolf Creek Cherokee Tribe, Inc. of Florida. Also in Florida.

=== Alaska ===
1. Chilkoot Kaagwaantaan Clan, Haines, AK. Letter of Intent to Petition 4/22/1997.
2. Five Landless Alaska Tlingit communities. These Tlingit communities were omitted from the Alaska Native Claims Settlement Act and received neither land nor subsistence rights under the Act.
3. Katalla-Chilkat Tlingit Tribe of Alaska, Juneau, AK. Letter of Intent to Petition 02/02/1995; certified letter returned by P.O. 10/1997.
4. Knugank, Dillingham, AK. Letter of Intent to Petition 1/7/1999.
5. Qutekcak Native Tribe, Seward, AK. Letter of Intent to Petition 2/13/2002. Receipt of Petition 2/13/2002.
6. Tsimshian Tribal Council, Ketchikan, AK. Letter of Intent to Petition 07/02/1978.
7. Alexander Creek, Alexander Creek, AK

=== Arizona ===
1. American Cherokee Confederacy
2. Arizona Cherokee Pioneers
3. Barrio Pascua – a village of Yaqui on the Arizona-Mexico border region.
4. Chiricahua Apache Ndeh Nation, Silver City, AZ
5. The United Cherokee Nation (UCN) – Western National Office. Also in Georgia. Supposed "clans" organized in these areas, often calling themselves as "Cherokee Nation of ...": Alabama, Alaska, Alberta, Arizona (Georgia, Nevada), Arkansas, California, Colorado (New Mexico, Utah), Connecticut, Cyprus, Delaware, Florida, Hawaii, Idaho (Montana), Indiana, Kentucky, Louisiana (Mississippi), Maine, Maryland, Massachusetts, Michigan, Missouri (Kansas), Nebraska (Iowa), New Hampshire, New Jersey, New York, North Carolina, North Dakota, Ohio, Oklahoma, Oregon, Pennsylvania, Rhode Island, South Carolina, South Dakota, Tennessee, Texas, Vermont, Virginia, Washington, West Virginia, Wisconsin (Illinois (Chicago and Metropolis branches), Minnesota) and Wyoming.

=== Arkansas ===
1. Amonsoquath Tribe of Cherokee, Van Buren, MO
2. Arkansas Band of Western Cherokee (formerly Western Arkansas Cherokee Tribe), Sulphur Springs, AR. Letter of Intent to Petition 04/07/1998.
3. Arkansas Cherokee (also known as Chickamauga Cherokee of Arkansas), Conway, AR. Letter of Intent to Petition 03/21/2008.
4. Arkansas Cherokee Nation, Conway, AR
5. Arkansas White River Cherokee (also in Florida), Lady Lake, FL
6. Central Tribal Council, Mammoth Springs, AR. Letter of Intent to Petition 01/21/2003. Receipt of Petition 01/21/2003.
7. Cherokee Nation West of Missouri and Arkansas (formerly Cherokee Nation West or Southern Band of the Eastern Cherokee Indians of Arkansas and Missouri). Letter of Intent to Petition 5/11/1998. Also in Missouri.
8. Cherokee-Choctaw Nation of St. Francis and Black Rivers, Paragould, AR. Letter of Intent to Petition 08/01/2006.
9. Confederated Western Cherokees of Arkansas.
10. Lost Cherokee of Arkansas and Missouri, Conway, AR. Letter of Intent to Petition 02/10/1999; letter returned, marked "in dispute" between two different addresses.
  1. Lost Cherokee of Arkansas and Missouri (I). Faction in Conway, AR.
  2. Lost Cherokee of Arkansas and Missouri (II). Faction in Dover, AR.
11. Manataka American Indian Council, Hot Springs, AR
12. Neches Tribe – Cherokee Nation, Hot Springs, AR
13. Northern Cherokee Nation. Dissolved into three groups:
  1. Chickamauga Cherokee Nation (I), also known as Chickamauga Cherokee Nation MO/AR White River Band and as White River Band of Northern Cherokee Nation of Missouri and Arkansas. Also in Missouri and Oklahoma. There is also a Chickamauga Cherokee Nation White River Band (II) in Oklahoma.
  2. Northern Cherokee Nation of the Old Louisiana Territory, Columbia, MO. Letter of Intent to Petition 2/19/1992. Also in Missouri.
    1. Kanasas (Awi Akta) District of NCNOLT.
    2. Oklahoma (Ani Tsi Na) District of the NCNOLT.
  3. Northern Cherokee Tribe of Indians of Missouri and Arkansas. Letter of Intent to Petition 07/26/1985. Also in Missouri.
14. Old Settler Cherokee Nation of Arkansas. Letter of Intent to Petition 9/17/1999.
15. Ouachita Cherokee of Cherokee Nation West, Mena, AR
16. Ozark Mountain Cherokee Tribe of Arkansas and Missouri, Melbourne, AR. Letter of Intent to Petition 10/19/1999. Receipt of Petition 10/19/1999. Also in Missouri.
17. Red Nation of the Cherokee, Augusta, KS Also in Kansas.
18. Revived Ouachita Indians of Arkansas and America, Story, AR. Letter of Intent to Petition 04/25/1990.
19. Sac River and White River Bands of the Chickamauga-Cherokee Nation of Arkansas and Missouri Inc. (formerly Northern Chickamauga Cherokee Nation of Arkansas and Missouri), Chandler, OK. Letter of Intent to Petition 09/05/1991. Also in Missouri.
20. Western Cherokee of Arkansas and Louisiana Territories. Letter of Intent to Petition 10/05/2001. Also in Missouri.
21. Western Cherokee Nation of Arkansas and Missouri, Mena, AR. Letter of Intent to Petition 05/01/1998. Also in Missouri.
22. Western Cherokee Nation of Arkansas and Missouri, Conway, AR. Separate from the Mena group, this Conway group was represented by Cary G. Kuykendall.

=== California ===
1. Alexander Valley Mishewal Wappo, also Mishewal Wappo Indians of Alexander Valley
2. Alexander Valley Rancheria, formerly federally recognized, terminated on August 1, 1961 The N.D. Cal. argued that statute of limitations was exceeded.
3. Amah Mutsun band of Ohlone/Costanoan Indians (formerly Amah Band of Ohlone/Costanoan Indians). Letter of Intent to Petition 09/18/1990.
4. Amonsoquath Tribe of Cherokee. Letter of Intent to Petition. Also in Missouri.
5. Ani Yvwi Yuchi (Cherokee). Letter of Intent to Petition 7/31/1996.
6. Antelope Valley Paiute Tribe (a.k.a. Antelope Valley Indian Community). Letter of Intent to Petition 07/09/1976.
7. Atahun Shoshones of San Juan Capistrano
8. Barbareño/Ventureño Band of Mission Indians. Letter of Intent to Petition 01/17/2002. Receipt of Petition 01/17/2002.
9. Big Meadows Lodge Tribe
10. Binay Yeha Noha Bear Clan Tribe Letter of Intent to Petition 08/31/2020
11. Cache Creek Rancheria, formerly federally recognized, terminated on April 11, 1961
12. Calaveras County Band of Miwuk Indians, Letter of Intent to Petition 08/31/2001. also Calaveras Band of Miwuk Indians, West Point
13. California Indian Council/Lulapin
14. Callattakapa Choctaw Tribe. Letter of Intent to Petition 07/13/2004.
15. Calusa-Seminole Nation. Letter of Intent to Petition 04/28/1998.
16. Cherokee Nation Heritage Organization of California.
17. The Cherokees of California.
18. Chilula Tribe
19. The Chiricahua Tribe of California. Letter of Intent to Petition 04/24/2003.
20. Choctaw Allen Tribe. Letter of Intent to Petition 10/20/2003.
21. Choinumni Council. Letter of Intent to Petition 07/14/1988. Certified letter undeliverable 10/1997
22. Chukchansi Yokotch Tribe of Mariposa CA. Letter of Intent to Petition 05/25/1993.
23. Chumash Council of Bakersfield. Letter of Intent to Petition 10/18/2005.
24. Coastal Band of Chumash. Letter of Intent to Petition 03/25/1982.
25. Coastal Gabrieleño Diegueño Band of Mission Indians. Letter of Intent to Petition 3/18/1997.
26. Coastanoan Band of Carmel Mission Indians. Letter of Intent to Petition 09/16/1988.
27. Colfax-Todds Valley Consolidated Tribe of the Colfax Rancheria
28. Confederated Villages of Lisjan Nation Inc., Oakland, CA
29. Confederation of Aboriginal Nations
30. Costanoan Rumsen Carmel Tribe. Letter of Intent to Petition 08/24/1994.
31. Costanoan Tribe of Santa Cruz and San Juan Bautista Missions. Letter of Intent to Petition 5/11/1999; Letter of Intent withdrawn 5/10/2000.
32. Costoanoan Ohlone Rumsen-Mutsen Tribe. Letter of Intent to Petition 12/07/1994.
33. Diegueño Band of San Diego Mission Indians. Letter of Intent to Petition 10/15/2003.
34. The Displaced Elem Lineage Emancipated Members (a.k.a. DELEMA). Letter of Intent to Petition 05/11/1998.
35. Dumna-Wo-Wah Tribal Government (formerly Dumna Tribe of Millerton Lake). Letter of Intent to Petition 01/22/2002. Receipt of Petition 01/22/2002 as "Dumna Tribal Council".
36. Dunlap Band of Mono Indians (a.k.a. Mono Tribal Council of Dunlap). Letter of Intent to Petition 01/04/1984. Letter of Intent withdrawn 7/2/2002; Letter of Intent to Petition 8/9/2005.
37. El Dolorado Rancheria, formerly federally recognized, terminated on July 16, 1966
38. Eshom Valley Band of Michahai and Wuksachi. Letter of Intent to Petition 05/24/2005.
39. Esselen/Coastanoan Tribe of Monterey County, also Esselen Tribe of Monterey Council. Letter of Intent to Petition 11/16/1992; withdrawn 11/15/1996.
40. Fernandeño/Tataviam Tribe, also Fernandeño Tataviam Band of Mission Indians. Letter of Intent to Petition 04/24/1995.
41. Gabrieleño Band of Mission Indians of California. Letter of Intent to Petition 11/03/1998. Recognized only as band of the Gabrieliño-Tongva Tribe.
42. First Nation of Ojibwe California, Fremont, CA
43. Gabrieliño/Tongva Indians of California Tribal Council. Letter of Intent to Petition 08/14/1997. Recognized only as band of the Gabrieliño-Tongva Tribe.
44. Gabrieliño/Tongva Nation. Letter of Intent to Petition 03/21/1994. Recognized only as band of the Gabrieliño-Tongva Tribe.
45. Gabrieliño-Tongva Tribe, also known as the San Gabriel Band of Mission Indians. In 1994, the State of California recognized the Gabrieliño-Tongva Tribe in Assembly Joint Resolution 96, Resolution Chapter 146 of the Statutes of 1994; however, it has no state-recognized tribes today. The tribe, however, has broken into several factions, some of whom are seeking federal recognition as separate tribes. The three largest and most prominent factions are:
  1. Gabrieliño-Tongva Tribe, West Hills, CA, formerly the San Gabriel Band of Mission Indians, led by Charles Alvarez
  2. Gabrieleño/Tongva Tribal Council of San Gabriel, San Gabriel, CA, led by Anthony Morales
  3. Gabrieleño/Tongva Nation, also Gabrieliño/Tongva Tribe of the Los Angeles Basin). In past years, bills have been introduced in the California legislature to create a Gabrieliño-Tongva Reservation for the tribe and grant the tribe gaming rights; however, these bills failed to make it to the Governor's desk. Senate Bill 1134 introduced on January 30, 2008, would have created the Gabrieliño/Tongva Reservation without giving the tribe gaming rights. However, when the principal author, Senator Oropeza, found out that the tribe would use the reservation for leverage to obtain gaming rights, she pulled her sponsorship of the bill.
46. Honey Lake Maidu. Letter of Intent to Petition 06/01/2000. Receipt of Petition 06/01/2000.
47. Hownonquet Community Association
48. Indian Canyon Band of Coastanoan/Mutsun Indians. Letter of Intent to Petition 06/09/1989.
49. Independence 14 (Miranda Allotment)
50. Indian Cultural Organization
51. Indian Ranch Rancheria, formerly federally recognized, terminated on September 22, 1964
52. Juaneño Band of Mission Indians, Acjachemen Nation (II). (Copycat band) Letter of Intent to Petition 3/8/1996. Decline to Acknowledge 12/03/2007 (72 FR 67951).
53. Kawaiisu Nation, Kernville, CA
54. Kawaiisu Tribe of the Tejon Indian Reservation
55. Kern Valley Indian Community, Lake Isabella, CA. Letter of Intent to Petition 02/27/1979.
56. Konkow Valley Band of Maidu, Oroville, CA. Letter of Intent to Petition 08/20/1998.
57. Maidu Nation. Letter of Intent to Petition 1/6/1977
58. Mark West Rancheria, formerly federally recognized, terminated on April 11, 1961
59. Melochundum Band of Tolowa Indians
60. Mishkanaka (Chumash)
61. Mission Creek Reservation, formerly federally recognized, terminated on July 14, 1970
62. Miwok Tribe
63. Monachi Indian Tribe. Letter of Intent to Petition 10/14/2004.
64. Mono Lake Indian Community, Lee Vining, CA Letter of Intent to Petition 07/09/1976.
65. Mono Lake Kootzaduka'a Tribe, Lee Vining, CA
66. Muwekma Ohlone Tribe (formerly Ohlone/Costanoan Muwekma Tribe a.k.a. Muwekma Indian Tribe: Costanoan/Ohlone Indian Families of the San Francisco Bay). Letter of Intent to Petition 05/09/1989. Declined to Acknowledge 9/17/2002 (67 FR 58631); decision effective 12/16/2002.
67. Nashville Eldorado Miwok Tribe. Letter of Intent to Petition 11/09/2004.
68. Nevada City Rancheria, formerly federally recognized, terminated on September 22, 1961
69. Nor-Rel-Muk Nation (formerly Hayfork Band; formerly Nor-El-Muk Band of Wintu Indians). Letter of Intent to Petition 01/05/1984.
70. North Fork Band of Mono Indians. Letter of Intent to Petition 09/07/1983.
71. North Valley Yokut Tribe. Letter of Intent to Petition 09/22/2000. Receipt of Petition 09/22/2000.
72. Northern Band of Mono-Yokuts. Letter of Intent to Petition 08/22/2006.
73. Northern Chumash Tribal Council, Baywood-Los Osos, CA
74. Northern Maidu Maidu Tribe
75. Northfolk Band of Mono Indians
76. Ohlone/Costanoan-Esselen Nation. Letter of Intent to Petition 12/03/1992.
77. Paskenta Band of Momlaki Indians
78. Rancho San Timoteo Band of Serrano Indians
79. Ruffeys Rancheria, formerly federally recognized, terminated on April 11, 1961 In 2017, Doug LaMalfa introduced the Ruffey Rancheria Restoration Act.
80. San Cayetano Band of Cahuilla Indians or the Montoya Band of Cahuilla Indians
81. Salinan Nation (a.k.a. Salinan Chumash Nation). Letter of Intent to Petition 10/10/1989.
82. Salinan Tribe of Monterey & San Luis Obispo Counties. Letter of Intent to Petition 11/13/1993.
83. San Fernando Band of Mission Indians (formerly Ish Panesh United Band of Indians; formerly Oakbrook Chumash People a.k.a. Ish Panesh Band of Mission Indians, Oakbrook Park Chumash). Letter of Intent to Petition 05/25/1995.
84. San Luis Rey Band of Mission Indians. Letter of Intent to Petition 10/18/1984.
85. Shasta Nation. Letter of Intent to Petition 05/28/1982.
86. She-Bel-Na Band of Mendocino Coast Pomo Indians. Letter of Intent to Petition 03/01/2006.
87. Sierra Foothill Wuksachi Yokuts Tribe. Letter of Intent to Petition 05/11/1999.
88. Southern Sierra Miwuk Nation, Mariposa, CA (formerly American Indian Council of Mariposa County). Letter of Intent to Petition 04/24/1982.
89. Strawberry Valley Rancheria, formerly federally recognized, terminated on April 11, 1961
90. Tehatchapi Tribe of the Tejon Reservation
91. Tinoqui-Chalola Council of Kitanemuk and Yowlumne Tejon Indians. Letter of Intent to Petition 01/16/1996.
92. Tolowa Nation. Letter of Intent to Petition 01/31/1983.
93. Tolowa-Tututni Tribe. Also in Oregon.
94. Toulumne Algerine Band of Yokut. Letter of Intent to Petition 01/23/2006.
95. Tuolumne Band of Cherokee Indians.
96. Traditional Choinuymni Tribe. Letter of Intent to Petition 03/29/2000. Receipt of Petition 03/29/2000.
97. T'Si-akim Maidu. Letter of Intent to Petition 11/16/1998.
98. Tsnungwe Council (a.k.a. South Fork Hupa). Letter of Intent to Petition 09/22/1992.
99. United Lumbee Nation of North Carolina and America. Letter of Intent to Petition 04/28/1980; Declined to Acknowledge 07/02/1985 (50 FR 18746). Also in North Carolina.
100. United Maidu Nation. Letter of Intent to Petition 01/06/1977.
101. Wadatkuht Band of the Northern Paiutes of the Honey Lake Valley. Letter of Intent to Petition 01/26/1995.
102. Washoe/Paiute of Antelope Valley. Letter of Intent to Petition 07/09/1976.
103. Winnemem Wintu Tribe, Redding, CA
104. Wintoon Indians. Letter of Intent to Petition 10/26/1984; certified letter returned by P.O. 10/1997.
105. The Wintoon Tribe of Northern California, Inc. Letter of Intent to Petition 04/27/2005.
106. Wintu Indians of Central Valley, California. Letter of Intent to Petition 10/26/1984; certified letter returned by P.O. 10/1997.
107. Wintu of Shasta-Toyon
108. Wintu Tribe of Northern California. Letter of Intent to Petition 08/25/1993.
109. Woodfords Community Council
110. Wukchumni Council Letter of Intent to Petition 02/22/1988. Certified letter undeliverable 10/1997.
111. Xolon Salinan Tribe, Bay Point, CA Letter of Intent to Petition 09/18/2001.
112. Yak Tityu Tityu Yak Tiłhini, also yak tityu tityu yak tiłhini Northern Chumash Tribe of San Luis Obispo County and Region, YTT Northern Chumash Tribe, San Luis Obispo, CA
113. Yamassee Native American Association of Nations, Van Nuys, CA
114. Yaqui Nation of Southern California, Thousand Palms, CA
115. Yaquis of Southern California, Borrego Springs, CA,
116. Yokayo Tribe of Indians. Letter of Intent to Petition 03/09/1987. Certified letter returned by P.O. 10/1997
117. Yosemite Mono Lake Paiute Indian Community. Letter of Intent to Petition 12/06/2005.

=== Colorado ===
1. Munsee Thames River Delaware, Manitou Springs, CO. Letter of Intent to Petition 07/22/1977; declined to Acknowledge 01/03/1983 47 FR 50109.
2. Council for the Benefit of the Colorado Winnebagoes, Aurora, CO. Letter of Intent to Petition 01/26/1993; certified letter returned "attempted, not known" 11/5/1997.

=== Connecticut ===
1. Grasmere Band of Wangunk Indians of Glastonbury, Connecticut, Middleton, CT (formerly the Pequot Mohegan Tribe, Inc.). Letter of Intent to Petition 4/12/1999.
2. Native American Mohegans, Inc., Norwich, CT. Letter of Intent to Petition 9/19/2002. Receipt of Petition 9/19/2002.
3. The Nehantic Tribe and Nation, Chester, CT. Letter of Intent to Petition 9/5/1997.
4. New England Coastal Schaghticoke Indian Association
5. Nipmuc Indian Association of Connecticut, Thompson, CT
6. Nipmuc Indian Bands
7. Paugussett Tribal Nation of Waterbury, Connecticut. Letter of Intent to Petition 7/3/2002. Receipt of Petition 7/3/2002.
8. Pocasset Wampanoag Indian Tribe, Cheshire, CT. Letter of Intent to Petition 02/01/1995
9. Poquonnock Pequot Tribe, Ledyard, CT. Letter of Intent to Petition 7/7/1999.
10. Schaghticoke Tribe, Bridgeport. CT, not the same as the Schaghticoke Indian Tribe, Kent, CT.
11. The Southern Pequot Tribe, Waterford, CT (a.k.a. The Southern Pequot Tribal Nation of Waterford). Letter of Intent to Petition 7/7/1998.
12. The Western Pequot Tribal Nation of New Haven, West Haven, CT. Letter of Intent to Petition 11/27/2000.

=== Delaware ===
1. Assateague Peoples Tribe, Frankford, DE
2. Lenape Indian Tribe of Delaware, Cheswold, DE, incorporated 2014

=== District of Columbia ===
1. Cherokee Tuscarora Nation of Turtle Island

=== Florida ===
1. Apalachicola Band of Creek Indians. Letter of Intent to Petition 08/17/2004
2. Arkansas White River Cherokee (a.k.a. Chickamauga Cherokee Nation - White River Band (I)). Letter of Intent to Petition 10/22/2003. Despite the Arkansas name, the group is located in Florida. There is also a Chickamauga Cherokee Nation - White River Band (II) and (III) in Oklahoma.
3. Binay Tribe
4. Chickamauga Cherokee Indian Creek Band
5. Choctaws of Florida (a.k.a. Hunter Tsalagi-Choctaw Tribe). Letter of Intent to Petition 03/02/2005. Declined to acknowledge 2013-07-11.
6. Choctaw Nation of Florida.
7. Church of the Métis Tribe.
8. Creeks East of the Mississippi (a.k.a. Principal Creek Indian Nation East of the Mississippi). Letter of Intent to Petition 03/21/1973 (petitioned as part of a State-recognized tribe Lower Muskogee Creek Tribe – East of the Mississippi, Inc., Georgia); declined to Acknowledge 12/21/1981 46 FR 51652, see also 47 FR 14783
9. Echota Cherokee Tribe of Florida
10. Florida Mockingbird Clan
11. Florida Tribe of Cherokee Indians, Inc
12. Florida Tribe of Eastern Creeks.
13. Indian Creek Band, Chickamauga Creek & Cherokee Inc. Letter of Intent to Petition 02/19/2004.
14. Lower Chattahoochee Band of Yuchi Indians
15. Muscogee Creek Indian Tribe East of the Mississippi County, Navarre, FL
16. Muscogee Nation of Florida (formerly Florida Tribe of Eastern Creek Indians). Letter of Intent to Petition 06/02/1978; awaiting Active Consideration; all documents have been filed with BAR.
  1. Creek-Euchee Band of Indians of Florida. Letter of Intent to Petition; Receipt of Petition 11/23/1999. Letter of Intent withdrawn 10/20/2000; merged with Florida Tribe of Eastern Creek Indians
17. Ocali Nation, Ocala, FL
18. Oklewaha Band of Seminoles.
19. Oklevueha Band of Yamassee Seminole, also Oklevueha Band of Yamassee, Orange Springs, FL
20. Ouachita Indians of Florida and America
21. Original Miccosukee Simanolee Nation, Clewiston, FL. Also Council of the Original Miccosukee Simanolee Nation Aboriginal Peoples.
22. Perdido Bay Tribe of Lower Muscogee Creeks
23. Rainbow Tribes, Tampa Bay, FL
24. Red Nation's Intertribal
25. Santa Rosa Band of the Lower Muscogee, also Santa Rosa County Creek Indian Tribe, Milton, FL
26. Seminole Nation of Florida (a.k.a. Traditional Seminole). Letter of Intent to Petition 08/05/1983; referred to SOL for determination 5/25/1990.
27. Siwanoy Nation Incorporated, Tampa, FL
28. Sovereign Miccosukee Seminole Nation, a.k.a. Everglades Miccosukee Tribe of Seminole Indians.
29. Topachula Tribe
30. Tuscola United Cherokee Tribe of Florida, Inc. (formerly Tuscola United Cherokees of Florida & Alabama, Inc.). Letter of Intent to Petition 01/19/1979; withdrawn at petitioner's request 11/24/1997; reinstated 2005.
31. Wolf Creek Cherokee Tribe, Inc. of Florida, Milton, FL. Also in Alabama.

=== Georgia ===
1. AhíTvlâōfoh Yamassee-Guale Tribe in Georgia, also Yamassee-Guale Tribe in Georgia
2. American Cherokee Confederacy (see Southeastern Cherokee Confederacy, Inc. (SECC) below). Known Bands: Horse Band (OK).
3. Broad River Band of Cherokee.
4. Cane Break Band of Eastern Cherokees. Letter of Intent to Petition 01/09/1979; rejoined Georgia Tribe of Eastern Cherokees, Inc. (I), notification 7/16/1997
5. Cherokee Indians of Georgia, Inc.
6. Chickamauga Cherokee Band of Northwest Georgia.
7. Georgia Band of Chickasaw Indians (formerly Mississippi Band of Chickasaw Indians). Letter of Intent to Petition 9/15/1998.
8. Georgia Tribe of Eastern Cherokees, Inc. (II). This is an unrecognized tribe in Dahlonega, GA, that have the same name as a State-recognized tribe Georgia Tribe of Eastern Cherokees, Inc. (I).
9. Georgia Tribe of Eastern Cherokees, Inc. (III). This is an unrecognized tribe that have the same name as a State-recognized tribe Georgia Tribe of Eastern Cherokees, Inc. (I).
10. Kokeneschv Natchez Nation.
11. Manahoac Saponi Nation
12. North Georgia Cherokee Indians.
13. South-Eastern Indian Nation. Incomplete Letter of Intent to Petition 01/05/1996; Incomplete Letter of Intent withdrawn at petitioner's request 11/10/1997.
14. Southeastern Cherokee Confederacy, Inc. (SECC) Letter of Intent to Petition 03/09/1978; Declined to Acknowledge 11/25/1985 (50 FR 39047). Became the American Cherokee Confederacy on 1/31/1996, with a breakaway group Southeastern Cherokee Council, Inc. (SeCCI) forming on the same day. Bands: Northwest Cherokee Wolf Band (OR), Red Clay Intertribal Indian Band (TN).
15. Southeastern Cherokee Council, Inc. (SeCCI). Also in Michigan. Bands and Clans: Big Lake Eagle Band (AK), Black Wolf Clan (KY), Blue Band (FL), Buffalo Creek Band (TN), Earth Band (PA), Enola Band (NC), Grey Wolf Clan of Ochlocknee (GA), Hummingbird Band (CA), Hummingbird Medicine Band (MO), Little Wolf Band (MI), Long Hair Band (FL), Lost Tribes Band (MI, MN), Many Waters Band (DE, MD), Mountain Band (NC), Myrtlewood Band (OR), Nighthawk Medicine Clan (FL), Northern Lights Band (MN), One Spirit Band (TN), Panther Band (GA), Patoka Valley Band (IN), Red Cedar (VA), Running Horse Band (TX), Tennessee Chota Band (TN), Turtle Band (OK), Turtle Island Band (OH), Turtle Moon Band (FL), Uwharie Band (NC), Wandering Waters Band (MI), Wee Toc Band (NC), Where Rivers Meet Band (MI), Windsong Band (DC (MD)).
16. Southeastern Indian Nation.
17. Tama Indian Tribe
18. Uganawvkalvgv Kituwah Ayeli, also known as Southeast Kituwah Nation.
19. The United Cherokee Nation (UCN) – Eastern National Office. Also in Arizona.
20. The United Creeks of Georgia
21. The Yamassee Native American Moors of the Creek Nation. Letter of Intent to Petition 4/27/1999.

=== Idaho ===
1. Delawares of Idaho, Inc., Meridian, ID. Letter of Intent to Petition 06/26/1979.
2. Lemhi-Shoshone Tribes was stripped of recognition in 1907.

=== Illinois ===
1. Choctaw Nation Mississippi River Clan
2. The People of the Mountains. Letter of Intent 6/3/2004.
3. Vinyard Indian Settlement of Shawnee Indians. Bill HB3217 proposed for state recognition.

=== Indiana ===
1. Algonquian Confederacy of the Quinnipiac Tribal Council, Milltown, IN
2. Eel River Tribe Inc. of Indiana. Letter of Intent to Petition 09/13/2006.
3. Lone Wolf Band of Cherokee Indians.
4. Lost River Band of the Cherokees, Mitchell, IN
5. Miami Nation of Indians of the State of Indiana, Inc. Letter of Intent to Petition 04/02/1980; Declined to Acknowledge 08/17/1992 57 FR 27312.
6. Northern Cherokee Tribe of Indiana. Letter of Intent to Petition 7/26/1985
7. United Métis Tribe
  1. Buffalo Spirit Band of the United Métis Tribe
  2. Nimkii Band of the United Métis Tribe
8. Upper Kispoko Band of the Shawnee Nation. Letter of Intent to Petition 04/10/1991; certified letter returned undeliverable 10/30/1997.
9. Wea Indian Tribe, Frankton, IN, incorporated 2017. Claims re-establishment in 2000 Letter of Intent to Petition 03/21/2007.
10. Wea Indian Tribe of Indiana. Claims re-establishment in 2004 Letter of Intent to Petition 11/29/2006.
11. The Zibiodey / River Heart Metis Association/Band

=== Iowa ===
1. United People of Cherokee Heritage.

=== Kansas ===
1. Delaware-Muncie Tribe. Letter of Intent to Petition 06/19/1978.
2. Kaweah Indian Nation, Inc. Also in North Carolina.
3. Neutral Land Cherokee Group. Also in Missouri.
4. Northern Cherokee Nation of the Old Louisiana Territory. Located in Arkansas and Missouri
  1. Kanasas (Awi Akta) District of NCNOLT. – Located in Kansas
  2. Oklahoma (Ani Tsi Na) District of the NCNOLT. – Located in Oklahoma.
5. Red Nation of the Cherokee. Also in Arkansas.
6. Swan Creek & Black River Chippewas.
7. Tripanick Nansemond Family Indian Tribe.
8. United Tribe of Shawnee Indians. Letter of Intent to Petition 07/06/1995.
9. Wyandot Nation of Kansas. Letter of Intent to Petition 05/12/1994.

=== Kentucky ===
1. Black Wolf Clan of SE Cherokee Council, Inc.
2. Cherokee Tribe of Kentucky.
3. Kentucky Cherokee Heritage Group
4. Kentucky Southern Cherokee—Osda Nuwati, Louisville, KY
5. Nolin River Band of Saponi (formerly the Nolin River Indian Community)
6. Southern Cherokee Nation of Kentucky.
7. Ridgetop Shawnee Tribe of Indians, Hazard, KY, received a congratulary resolution, HJR15 09RS in 2009
8. Tribe of the Whitetop Band of Native Indians, also The Whitetop Nation, Georgetown, KY

=== Louisiana ===
1. Apalachee Indian Tribe, Alexandria, LA Letter of Intent to Petition 01/22/1996.
2. Apalachee Indians of Anhaica Organization, Dry Prong, LA, incorporated 2022
3. Apalachee Indians Talimali Band, Stonewall, LA
4. Atakapa-Ishak Nation, Lake Charles, LA
5. Avogel Nation of Louisiana, Marksville, LA Letter of Intent to Petition 11/13/2000.
6. Avogel, Okla Tasannuk, Tribe/Nation, Duson, LA Letter of Intent to Petition 03/19/2001.
7. Avoyel-Kaskaskia Tribe of Louisiana, Marksville, LA Letter of Intent to Petition 06/20/2005.
8. The Avoyel-Taensa Tribe/Nation of Louisiana Inc., Marksville, LA Letter of Intent to Petition 01/09/2003. Receipt of Petition 01/09/2003.
9. Bayou Lacombe Band of Choctaw, St. Tammany Parish, LA
10. Biloxi, Chitimacha Confederation of Muskogees, Inc., Bourg, LA
11. Chahta Tribe.
12. Canneci Tinné Apache Tribe, also Coco Tribe of Canneci Tinne, Carencro, LA
13. Golden Comanche Indian Tribe, Westwego, LA, incorporated 2018
14. Kispoko Sept of Ohio Shawnee.
15. Louisiana Choctaw Turtle Tribe
16. Red Shoe Tribe, Kinder, LA Letter of Intent to Petition 6/21/2010.
17. Talimali Band, The Apalachee Indians of Louisiana (formerly Apalachee Indians of Louisiana), Libuse, LA Letter of Intent to Petition 02/05/1996.

=== Maine ===
1. Métis Eastern Tribal Indian Society of Maine
2. Wesget Sipu Inc. Letter of Intent to Petition 6/4/2002. Receipt of Petition 6/4/2002.

=== Maryland ===
1. Assateague Peoples Tribes
2. Federation: Moorish Science Temple of America, Inc. Letter of Intent to Petition 01/23/96; determined ineligible to petition 5/15/1997.
3. Nause-Waiwash Band of Indians, Vienna, MD
4. Notoweega Nation. Filed with the Maryland Indian Commission for state recognition 6/9/2021.
5. Pocomoke Indian Nation, Eden, MD
6. Youghiogaheny River Band Of Shawnee Indians

=== Massachusetts ===
1. Assawompsett-Nemasket Band of Wampanoags, Lakeville, MA
2. Assonet Band of the Wampanoag Nation, New Bedford, MA
3. Chappaquiddick Band of Massachusetts, Andover, MA Letter of Intent to Petition 5/31/2007.
4. Chappaquiddick Tribe of the Wampanoag Indian Nation, South Yarmouth, MA. Letter of Intent to Petition 05/21/2007.
5. Chaubunagungamaug Band of the Nipmuck Nation, Webster/Dudley; Dudley, MA; Grafton, MA. Letter of Intent to Petition 04/22/1980 as part of Nipmuc Nation; separate letter of intent 5/31/1996. Declined to acknowledge on 6/25/2004, 69 FR 35664.
6. Council of Seven, Royal House of Pokanoket, Pokanoket Tribe, Pokanoket Nation, Millbury, MA
7. Cowasuck Band-Abenaki People, also known as Cowasuck Band of Pennacook Abenaki People, Franklin, MA. Letter of Intent to Petition 01/23/1995.
8. Federation of Old Plimoth Indian Tribes, Inc., Plymouth, MA. Letter of Intent to Petition 05/16/2000. Receipt of Petition 05/16/2000.
9. Historical Nipmuc Tribe, Webster, MA
10. Massachusett Tribe at Ponkapoag, Bridgewater, MA
11. Mattakeeset Tribe of the Massachuset Nation, Newton, MA. Also Mattakeeset Massachuset Tribe
12. Natick Nipmuc Indian Council, Natick, MA
13. New England Coastal Schaghticoke Indian Association and Tribal Council Natick, MA
14. Praying Indians of Natick and Ponkapoag, Stoughton, MA
15. Pocasset Wampanoag Tribe of the Pokanoket Nation / Watuppa Reservation, Great Falls, MA
16. Quinsigamond Band of the Nipmucs, Worcester, MA
17. Rebel Deaf Panther Tribe International, Ashland, MA
18. Seaconke Wampanoag Tribe, Seekonk, MA

=== Michigan ===
1. Burt Lake Band of Ottawa and Chippewa Indians. Petitioner #101. Denied, effective Jan. 23, 2007.
2. Genesee Valley Indian Association
3. Grand River Bands of Ottawa Indians (formerly Grand River Band Ottawa Council). Letter of Intent to Petition 10/16/1994.
4. Lake Superior Chippewa of Marquette. Letter of Intent to Petition 12/13/1991.
5. Little Owl Band of Central Michigan Indians, Sidney. Letter of Intent to Petition 11/27/2000.
6. Mackinac Bands of Chippewa and Ottawa Indians. Petitioner #186. Letter of intent submitted on May 13, 1998.
7. Maconce Village Band of Ojibwa. Letter of Intent to Petition 03/07/2000. Receipt of Petition 3/7/2000.
8. Maple River Band of Ottawa. Letter of Intent to Petition 01/31/2005.
9. Muskegon River Band of Ottawa Indians. Letter of Intent to Petition 07/26/2002. Receipt of Petition 07/26/2002.
10. Ooragnak Indian Nation. Letter of Intent to Petition 12/1/1999. Receipt of Petition 12/01/1999.
11. Southeastern Cherokee Council, Inc. (SeCCI). Also in Georgia.
12. Swan Creek Black River Confederated Ojibwa Tribes. Petitioner #135. Letter of intent submitted on May 4, 1993.
13. The Chi-cau-gon Band of Lake Superior Chippewa of Iron County. Letter of Intent to Petition 02/12/1998.
14. Wyandot of Anderdon Nation LLC. Letter of Intent to Petition 01/21/2003. Receipt of Petition 01/21/2003. Also in Ontario.

=== Minnesota ===
1. Kah-Bay-Kah-Nong (a.k.a. Gabekanaang Anishinaabeg/Warroad Chippewa), Letter of Intent to Petition 2/12/1979; Postal service returned certified letter 10/30/1997.
2. Kettle River Band of the St. Croix Chippewa of Minnesota. Currently recognized only as part of the Mille Lacs Band of Ojibwe.
3. Mendota Mdewakanton Dakota Community. Letter of Intent to Petition 4/11/1996.
4. Ni-Mi-Win Ojibways
5. Rice Lake Band of Mississippi Ojibwe. Currently recognized only as part of the Mille Lacs Band of Ojibwe.
6. Sandy Lake Band of Mississippi Chippewa, petitioned for independent federal recognition and independent state recognition. Currently recognized as part of the Mille Lacs Band of Ojibwe.
7. Snake and Knife Rivers Band of the St. Croix Chippewa of Minnesota. Currently recognized only as part of the Mille Lacs Band of Ojibwe.
8. St. Croix Chippewa of Minnesota. Currently recognized as part of the Mille Lacs Band of Ojibwe.

=== Mississippi ===
1. Grand Village Natchez Indian Tribe
2. Mississippi Choctaw Indian Federation (defunct historic organization)
3. Vancleave Live Oak Choctaw, Vancleave, MS. Letter of Intent to Petition 06/14/2006. State law MS HR50 in 2016 declared this organization "The Official Native American Tribe of the Choctaw People of Jackson County, Mississippi"

=== Missouri ===
1. Ahi Ni Yv Wiya, Inc.
2. Amonsoquath Band of Cherokee.
3. Amonsoquath Tribe of Cherokee. Letter of Intent to Petition 02/17/1995. Also in California.
4. Cherokee Nation West of Missouri & Arkansas (formerly Cherokee Nation West – Southern Band of the Eastern Cherokee Indians of Arkansas and Missouri). Letter of Intent to Petition 5/11/1998. Also in Arkansas.
5. Chickamauga Cherokee Nation.
6. Dogwood Band of Free Cherokees.
7. Lost Cherokee of Arkansas & Missouri, Letter of Intent to Petition 02/10/1999; letter returned, marked "in dispute" between two different addresses. Also in Conway, AR
8. Neutral Land Cherokee Group. Also in Kansas.
9. Northern Cherokee Nation. Dissolved into three groups:
  1. Chickamauga Cherokee Nation (I), also known as Chickamauga Cherokee Nation MO/AR White River Band and as White River Band of Chickamauga Cherokee Nation of Missouri and Arkansas. Also in Arkansas and Oklahoma. There is also a Chickamauga Cherokee Nation White River Band (II) in Oklahoma.
  2. Northern Cherokee Nation of the Old Louisiana Territory. Letter of Intent to Petition 2/19/1992. Also in Arkansas.
    1. Kanasas (Awi Akta) District of NCNOLT.
    2. Oklahoma (Ani Tsi Na) District of the NCNOLT.
  3. Northern Cherokee Tribe of Indians of Missouri and Arkansas. Letter of Intent to Petition 07/26/1985. Also in Arkansas.
10. Ozark Mountain Cherokee Tribe of Arkansas and Missouri. Letter of Intent to Petition 10/19/1999. Receipt of Petition 10/19/1999. Also in Arkansas.
11. Sac River and White River Bands of the Chickamauga-Cherokee Nation of Arkansas and Missouri Inc. (formerly Northern Chickamauga Cherokee Nation of Arkansas and Missouri). Letter of Intent to Petition 09/05/1991. Also in Arkansas.
12. Saponi Nation of Missouri (Mahenips Band). Letter of Intent to Petition 12/14/1999. Receipt of Petition 12/14/1999.
13. Southern Cherokee Indian Tribe. Letter of Intent to Petition 12/01/2006.
14. Western Cherokee.
15. Western Cherokee of Arkansas/Louisiana Territories. Letter of Intent to Petition 10/05/2001. Receipt of Petition 10/05/2001. Also in Arkansas.
16. Western Cherokee Nation of Arkansas and Missouri. Letter of Intent to Petition 05/01/1998. Also in Arkansas.
17. The Wilderness Tribe of Missouri. Letter of Intent to Petition 8/16/1999.

=== Montana ===
1. Swan Creek & Black River Chippewa

=== Nebraska ===
1. Nebraska band of Omaha-Winnebago Indians -->

=== Nevada ===
1. Pahrump Band of Paiutes, Pahrump, NV. Letter of Intent to Petition 11/9/1987.

=== New Hampshire ===
1. Abenaki Indian Center, Inc.
2. Abenaki Nation of New Hampshire, Whitefield, NH
3. Cowasuck Band–Pennacook/Abenaki People, Alton, NH
4. Koasek (Cowasuck) Traditional Band of the Sovereign Abenaki Nation, Post Mills, NH
5. Pennacook New Hampshire Tribe

=== New Jersey ===
1. Cherokee Nation of New Jersey
2. Eagle Medicine Band of Cherokee Indians, also in Pennsylvania
3. New Jersey Sand Hill Band of Indians (also known as Sand Hill Band of Lenape and Cherokee Indians or Sand Hill Band of Indians). Letter of Intent to Petition 01/09/2007.
4. Osprey Band of Free Cherokees
5. Unalachtigo Band of Nanticoke Lenni-Lenape Indians. Letter of Intent to Petition 2/1/2002.
6. Schèjachbi Wonameys, NJ Lenni Lenape Nation.

=== New Mexico ===
1. Canoncito Band of Navajos, petitioned for independent federal recognition 07/31/1989. Note: this is a Chapter (governing unit) of the federally recognized Navajo Nation.
2. Chiricahua Apache Nation, also Chiricahua Apache Nde Nation, Santa Clara, NM
3. Genízaros. In 2007, the New Mexico state legislator passed a memorial resolution honoring the Genízaros. New Mexico's Legislative Memorial bills do not have the force of law
4. Mazewalli Nation, Albuquerque, NM unrecognized group claiming to represent Mesoamerican diaspora in New Mexico
5. Piro/Manso/Tiwa Indian Tribe of the Pueblo of San Juan de Guadalupe, Las Cruces, NM. Letter of Intent to Petition 01/18/1971.
6. Piro/Manso/Tiwa Tribe of Guadalupe Pueblo (a.k.a. Tiwa Indian Tribe), Las Cruces, NM. Letter of Intent to Petition 12/17/2002. Receipt of Petition 12/17/2002.

=== New York ===
1. Cherokee-Blackfeet, New York City, NY. Also Cherokee Blackfoot Cultural Circle
2. The Chickamauga Notowega Creeks, Staten Island. Letter of Intent to Petition 03/19/2001.
3. Deer Council of Free Cherokees.
4. Hudson River Band (formerly Konkapot Band, Hudson Valley Band). Letter of Intent to Petition 04/19/2002. Receipt of Petition 04/19/2002.
5. Matinecock Tribal Nation, Kew Gardens, NY. Also Matinecock Tribal Nation of Queens and Long Island New York Inc.
6. Montauk Indian Nation, Amityville, NY. Also Montaukett Indian Nation of New York. Letter of Intent to Petition 07/31/1995.
7. Montaukett Tribe of Long Island. Letter of Intent to Petition 03/16/1998.
8. North-Eastern Band of Cherokee Indians.
9. Nuy Keetoowah, Inc.
10. Ohatchee Cherokee Tribe of New York and Alabama. Letter of Intent to Petition 12/16/2002. Receipt of Petition 12/16/2002.
11. Schaghticoke First Nations Inc.
12. Western Mohegan Tribe & Nation of New York. Letter of Intent to Petition 1/27/1997.

=== North Carolina ===
1. Algonquian Indians of North Carolina, Elizabeth City, NC
2. Cape Fear Band of Skarure and Woccon Indians, Leland, NC
3. Cherokee Indians of Hoke County, Inc. (a.k.a. Tuscarora Hoke Co.), Lumber Bridge, NC. Letter of Intent to Petition 09/20/1983; determined ineligible to petition (SOL opinion of 10/23/1989).
4. Cherokee Indians of Red Banks, Robeson and Adjoining Counties, Red Springs, NC. Letter of Intent to Petition 02/01/1979; determined ineligible to petition (SOL opinion of 10/23/1989).
5. Chicora-Siouan Indian People, Letter of Intent to Petition 02/10/1993. Also in South Carolina.
6. Chowanoke Indian Nation, formerly the Meherrin-Chowanoke, Winton, NC
7. Coree Indians (a.k.a. Faircloth Indians), Atlantic, NC. Letter of Intent to Petition 08/05/1978.
8. Creek-Cherokee Indians, Pine Tree Clan.
9. Cumberland County Association for Indian People
10. Eno-Occaneechi Tribe of Indians, Mebane, NC. Letter of Intent to Petition 11/24/1997.
11. Free Cherokee.
12. Four Hole Indian Organization, Letter of Intent to Petition 12/30/1976. Also in South Carolina.
13. Guilford Native American Association
14. Hattadare Indian Nation, Bunnlevel, NC. Letter of Intent to Petition 03/16/1979.
15. Hatteras Tuscarora Indians, Maxton, NC. Letter of Intent to Petition 06/24/1978: determined ineligible to petition (SOL opinion of 10/23/1989). Merged with Tuscarora Nation East of the Mountains, 3/22/2004.
16. Kaweah Indian Nation, Inc., Oriental, NC. Letter of Intent to Petition 04/28/1980; certified letter returned by P.O. 10/1997; Declined to Acknowledge 06/10/1985 (50 FR 14302). Also in Kansas.
17. Machapunga Tribe of North Carolina, also Machapunga/Mattamuskeet Tribe, Manteo, NC
18. Meherrin Indian Tribe (II). Letter of Intent to Petition 06/27/1995. There is a State-recognized tribe with the same name, Meherrin Indian Tribe (I).
19. Ne'Ha-Tsunii Indian Nation
20. Nee Tribe (a.k.a. Nuluti Equani Ehi Tribe and Near River Dwellers), East Bend, NC
21. New River Catawba, Taylorsville, NC. The Catawba Indian Nation issued a cease-and-desist letter to this organization in 2024.
22. Ridge Band of Cherokees, Ridgecraft, NC
23. Roanoke-Hatteras Indian Tribe, Elizabeth City, NC, formerly the Roanoke-Hatteras Indians of Dare County. Letter of Intent to Petition 03/10/2004.
24. Santee Tribe, White Oak Community. Letter of Intent to Petition 06/04/1979
25. Santee Tribe
26. Skaroreh Katenuaka Tuscarora Nation of Indians, Windsor, NC
27. Southeastern Cherokee Confederacy, Four Oaks, NC
28. Southeastern Cherokee Confederacy, Silver Cloud Clan.
29. Summerville Indian Group. Also in South Carolina.
30. Tsalagi Nation Early Emigrants 1817, Durham, NC. Letter of Intent to Petition 07/30/2002. Receipt of Petition 07/30/2002.
31. Tuscarora Indian Tribe, Drowning Creek Reservation, Maxton, NC. Letter of Intent to Petition 02/25/1981; determined ineligible to petition (SOL opinion of 10/23/1989). Group formally dissolved and department notified group 02/19/1997.
32. Tuscarora Nation of Indians of the Carolinas, Charlotte, NC. Letter of Intent to Petition 12/21/2004.
33. Tuscarora Nation of North Carolina, Maxton, NC. Letter of Intent to Petition 11/19/1985; determined ineligible to petition (SOL opinion of 10/23/1989).
34. Tuscarora Nation East of the Mountains, Bowland, NC. Letter of Intent to Petition 09/08/1999.
35. United Lumbee Nation of North Carolina and America. Letter of Intent to Petition 4/28/1980; Denied federal recognition 07/02/1985. Also in California. Not to be confused with the Lumbee Tribe of North Carolina, a federally recognized tribe.
36. Waccamaw Sioux Indian Tribe of Farmers Union, Clarkton, NC

=== North Dakota ===
1. Christian Pembina Chippewa Indians, Belcourt, ND Letter of Intent to Petition 6/26/1984.
2. Little Shell Band of the North Dakota Tribe, also Little Shell Pembina Band of North America, Rolla, ND. Letter of Intent to Petition 11/11/1975.

=== Ohio ===
1. Alleghenny Nation Indian Center (Ohio Band) (I), Canton, OH also known as the Allegheny-Lenape Indian Council of Ohio. Letter of Intent to Petition 11/03/1979.
2. Alleghenny Nation Indian Center (Ohio Band) (II). Letter of Intent to Petition 6/02/2005. Possibly broke away from Alleghenny Nation Indian Center (Ohio Band) (I) located 1 mile away.
3. Catawba Tribe of Carr's Run, Chillicothe, OH
4. Cherokee Delaware Indian Center, Coshocton, OH
5. Cherokee United Intertribal Indian Council.
6. Chickamauga Keetoowah Unami Band of Cherokee, Cleveland, OH
7. Chickamauga Keetoowah Unami Wolf Band of Cherokee Delaware Shawnee, Cleveland, OH. Also "Chickamauga Keetoowah Unami Wolf Band of Cherokee Delaware Shawnee of Ohio, West Virginia & Virginia". Letter of Intent to Petition 08/28/2006.
8. East of the River Shawnee
9. Eastern Cherokee Nation, Overhill Band.
10. Etowah Cherokee Nation.
11. Free Cherokee, Four Direction Council.
12. Free Cherokee, Hokshichanklya Band.
13. Kispoko Sept of Ohio Shawnee (Hog Creek Reservation).
14. Lower Eastern Ohio Mekojay Shawnee, Wilmington, OH. Letter of Intent to Petition 3/5/2001.
15. Mekoce Shawnee, Wilmington, OH
16. Morning Star Shawnee Nation, Shelby, OH
17. Munsee Delaware Indian Nation—USA, formerly known incorrectly as the "Munsee-Thames River Delaware" and as "Munsee Delaware Indian Nation".
18. North Eastern U.S. Miami Inter-Tribal Council, Youngstown, OH. Letter of Intent to Petition 04/09/1979.
19. Notoweega Nation, Logan, OH. Also known as the Ohio Woodlands Tribe.
20. The Nottoway in Ohio, Xenia, OH. Letter of Intent to Petition 07/03/2008.
21. Piqua Sept of Ohio Shawnee Indians, North Hampton, OH. Letter of Intent to Petition 04/16/1991. the Piqua Shawnee Tribe were state-recognized in Alabama in 1991 Letter of Intent to Petition 9/25/1997.
22. Saponi-Catawba Nation of the Ohio Valley, Webster, OH
23. Saponi Nation of Ohio, Rio Grande, OH. Letter of Intent to Petition 9/25/1997.
24. Shawnee Nation, Ohio Blue Creek Band of Adams County, Lynx, OH. Letter of Intent to Petition 8/5/1998.
25. Shawnee Nation United Remnant Band, Bellefontaine, OH
26. Tallige Cherokee Nation, Fire Clan.
27. Tutelo Nahyssan Tribal Nation, Cutler, OH. Letter of Intent to Petition 7/27/2005.
28. Tutelo-Saponi Tribal Nation (formerly known as Pine Hill Saponi Tribal Nation), Beavercreek, OH. Letter of Intent to Petition 10/1/2002.

=== Oklahoma ===
1. Canadian River Band of the Southern Cherokee Nation
2. Cataba Tribal Association
3. Chickamauga Cherokee Nation White River Band (II). There is also a Chickamauga Cherokee Nation White River Band (I) in Arkansas, Missouri, and Oklahoma.
4. Northern Cherokee Nation of the Old Louisiana Territory, also in Arkansas and Missouri
  1. Kanasas (Awi Akta) District of NCNOLT. – Located in Kansas
  2. Oklahoma (Ani Tsi Na) District of the NCNOLT. – Located in Oklahoma
5. Northern Cherokee Tribe of Indians
6. Northern Chickamaunga Cherokee Nation of Arkansas and Missouri. Letter of Intent to Petition 9/5/1991
7. Sac River and White River Bands of the Chickamauga Cherokee Nation of Arkansas and Missouri, Inc., Chandler, OK Also Chickamauga Cherokee Nation (I), also known as Chickamauga Cherokee Nation MO/AR White River Band and as White River Band of Chickamauga Cherokee Nation of Missouri and Arkansas. Also in Arkansas and Missouri. There is also a Chickamauga Cherokee Nation White River Band (II) in Oklahoma.
8. Southeastern Cherokee Confederacy, Horse Clan
9. Southern Cherokee Nation
10. United Band of the Western Cherokee Nation Letter of Intent to Petition 3/14/2003.
11. Yuchi Tribal Organization, Sapulpa, OK. Letter of Intent to Petition 10/05/1990; Declined to acknowledge 3/21/2000, 64 FR 71814., part of the federally recognized Muscogee (Creek) Nation.
12. Yuchi (Euchee) Tribe of Oklahoma, Sapulpa, OK, part of the federally recognized Muscogee (Creek) Nation.

=== Oregon ===
1. Celilio-Wyam Indian Community
2. Cherokee Delaware Tribe of the Northwest
3. Chetco Tribe
4. Clatsop-Nehalem Confederated Tribes
5. Confederated Tribes: Rogue, Table Rock & Associated Tribes; Letter of Intent to Petition 3/24/1997; properly executed Letter of Intent 6/19/1997
6. Northwest Cherokee Deer Clan
7. Northwest Cherokee Wolf and Paint Clan
8. Northwest Cherokee Wolf Band of the Southeastern Cherokee Confederacy, Talent, OR. Letter of Intent to Petition 03/09/1978; Declined to Acknowledge 11/25/1985 (50 FR 39047)
9. Tchinouk Indians, Letter of Intent to Petition 05/16/1979; Declined to Acknowledge 03/17/1986, 51 FR 2437
10. Tolowa-Tututni Tribe, also in California
11. Una Nation of Mixed-Bloods, also called the Sakochee Tribe of Native American Descendants, Eugene, OR

=== Pennsylvania ===
1. Conestoga-Susquehannock Tribe
2. Eastern Delaware Nations.
3. Erie Indian Moundbuilders Tribal Nation, Erie, PA
4. Free Cherokee-Chickamauga.
5. Lena'pe Nation.
6. Eastern Lenape Nation of Pennsylvania. Letter of Intent to Petition 05/16/2000.
7. Lenape Nation of Pennsylvania, Easton, PA
8. Southeastern Cherokee Confederacy of Pennsylvania.
9. Thunder Mountain Lenapé Nation, Saltsburg, PA
10. Tsalagi Elohi Cherokee Earth.
11. United Cherokee Tribe of West Virginia. Also in South Carolina and West Virginia.
12. White Path Society.

=== Rhode Island ===
1. Aquidneck Indian Council, Newport, RI
2. Northern Narragansett Indian Tribe of Rhode Island, Providence, RI
3. Pocasset Wampanoag Tribe of Massachusetts and Rhode Island
4. Pocasset Wampanoag Tribe of the Pokanoket Nation, Cranston, RI
5. Pokanoket Tribe of the Wampanoag Nation, Bristol, RI. Letter of Intent to Petition 10/05/1994 for Federal Recognition. State recognition attempted for the tribe with the introduction of State of Rhode Island House Bill 2006--H 7236, but the bill was never passed. Also in Massachusetts.
6. Pokanoket/Wampanoag Federation/Wampanoag Nation/Pokanoket Tribe/And Bands, Warwick, RI. Letter of intent to petition 1/5/1998.
7. Rhode Island Indian Council, Providence, RI
8. Seaconke Wampanoag Tribe, Providence, RI, formerly Greenwich, RI. Letter of Intent to Petition 10/29/1998.
9. Wappinger Tribal Nation, Wakefield, RI. Letter of Intent to Petition 7/7/2003.
10. Wiquapaug Eastern Pequot Tribe, Bradford, RI; formerly Hope Valley, RI. Letter of Intent to Petition 09/15/2000. Receipt of Petition 09/15/2000.

=== South Carolina ===
South Carolina recognizes some Native American entities as groups or special interest organizations, but not as tribes.

1. Chaloklowa Chickasaw Indian People, Hemingway, SC, a state-recognized group, but not a state-recognized tribe
2. Eastern Cherokee, Southern Iroquois, and United Tribes of South Carolina, Duncan, SC, a state-recognized group, but not a state-recognized tribe
3. Natchez Indian Tribe of South Carolina, Columbia, SC, a state-recognized group, but not a state-recognized tribe
4. Pee Dee Indian Nation of Beaver Creek, Neeses, SC, a state-recognized group, but not a state-recognized tribe
5. Pine Hill Indian Community Development Initiative, North, SC, state-recognized special interest organization, but not state-recognized tribe

Unrecognized organizations include:

1. American Indian Center of South Carolina.
2. Broad River Band of Cherokee.
3. Carolina Indian Heritage Association.
4. Cherokee Bear Clan of South Carolina.
5. Cherokees of South Carolina.
6. Chicora Indian Tribe of South Carolina (formerly Chicora-Siouan Indian People). Letter of Intent to Petition 02/10/1993. Also in North Carolina.
7. Croatan Indian Tribe of South Carolina, Orangeburg, SC
8. Fields Indian Family – Pine Hill Indian Community (or Pine Hill Indian Tribe).
9. Free Cherokee-Chickamauga
10. Horse Creek Indian Heritage Association.
11. Little Horse Creek American Indian Association.
12. Marlboro & Chesterfield Pee Dee Band (a.k.a. Upper Pee Dee Nation of South Carolina)
13. Midlands Intertribal Empowerment Group.
14. Pee Dee Indian Association. Letter of Intent to Petition 01/30/1995.
15. Redcrows Foundation. Associated with unrecognized Yamassee Indian Nation.
16. Santee Indian Nation.
17. United Cherokee Tribe of West Virginia. Also in Pennsylvania and West Virginia.
18. Waccamaw Siouan Indian Association. Letter of Intent to Petition 10/16/1992; Postal service returned certified letter 11/5/1997.
19. Yamasee Indian Tribe, Fairfax, SC, incorporated 2023
20. Yamassee Indian Tribe of Seminoles, Allendale, SC Also referred to as the Yamassee Tribe, or Yamassee Nation of Georgia, Florida, and South Carolina.

=== Tennessee ===
1. Central Band of Cherokee, Lawrenceburg, TN. Declined to acknowledge 7/24/2012
2. Cherokee Wolf Clan, Yuma, TN
3. Chikamaka Band, Tracy City, TN
4. Etowah Cherokee Nation (I), Cleveland, TN. Letter of Intent to Petition 12/31/1990; certified letter returned undeliverable 10/1997. State legislature denied state recognition, contesting the authority of a Proclamation of Recognition] by the Governor of Tennessee of May 25, 1978.
5. Guaymari Kiawah Tribe, Antioch, TN
6. Remnant Yuchi Nation, Kingsport, TN
7. Tanasi Council, Memphis, TN
8. United Eastern Lenape Nation, Winfield, TN
9. United Aniyunwiya Nation, Memphis, TN
10. Mennefer Tanasi (ᏔᎾᏏ) Native American Tribe, Germantown, TN. Also Mennefer Tanasi Empowerment Ministries.

=== Texas ===
As journalists Graham Lee Brewer (Cherokee Nation) and Tristan Ahtone (Kiowa) reported, Texas has "no legal mechanism to recognize tribes".

1. Absentee Seminole Tribe of Texas,
2. American Cherokee Tribe of Texas
3. Apache Council of Texas, Alice, TX
4. The Arista Indian Village. Letter of Intent to Petition 05/21/2002 Receipt of Petition 05/21/2002
5. Atakapas Ishak Nation of Southeast Texas and Southwest Louisiana. Letter of Intent to Petition 02/02/2007
6. Carrizo/Comecrudo Nation of Texas, also Tribal Council of the Carrizo/Comecrudo Nation of Texas. Letter of Intent to Petition 07/06/1998.
7. Cherokee Nation of Mexico, Dripping Springs, TX
8. Cherokee Nation of Texas, Limited.
9. Chickamauga Cherokee Brushy Creek Band.
10. Comanche Penateka Tribe. Letter of Intent to Petition 04/03/1998.
11. Court of the Golden Eagle, The Oukah.
12. Creek Indians of Texas at Red Oak
13. Cuelgahen Nde Lipan Apache of Texas, Three Rivers, TX
14. Free Cherokee, Hummingbird Clan
15. Jumano Tribe (West Texas) (formerly The People of LaJunta (Jumano/Mescalero)). Letter of Intent to Petition 03/26/1997.
16. Karankawa Kadla
17. Karankawa Tribe of Texas, Houston, TX. They broke away from the Karankawa Kadla
18. Lipan Apache Band of Texas, Brackettville, TX
19. Lipan Apache Nation of Texas, San Antonio, TX. Also known as the Kuné Tsa Nde Band of the Lipan Apache Nation of Texas
20. Miakan-Garza Band, also Mier Band of the Garza Tribe, in San Marcos, Texas; created the Indigenous Cultures Institute in 2006.
21. Lipan Apache Tribe of Bracketville Texas, Bracketville, TX
22. Lipan Apache Tribe of Texas, McAllen, TX. Also known as Lipan Apache Tribe. Texas Senate Bill 27, introduced in January 2021, to formally recognize this group died in committee.
23. Mount Tabor Indian Community. Also known as Texas Cherokees and Associate Bands-Mount Tabor Indian Community.
24. Nato Indian Nation (Native American Tribal Organization), Grand Prairie, TX, also in Utah
25. Pamaque Clan of Coahuila y Tejas Spanish Indian Colonial Missions Inc. Letter of Intent to Petition 04/23/2002; Receipt of Petition 04/23/2002. BAR Papers filed 2005.
26. Southeastern Cherokee Confederacy, Hawk Clan
27. Southeastern Cherokee Confederacy, Sequoyah Clan
28. Southeastern Cherokee Tribe and Associated Bands.
29. Sovereign Cherokee Nation Tejas
30. Tap Pilam: The Coahuiltecan Nation Letter of Intent to Petition 12/03/1997.
31. Texas Band of Yaqui Indians
32. Texas Buffalo Bayou Band of Chickamaugan Cherokee, Southern Cherokee Nation.
33. Texas Gulf Coast Cherokee and Associated Bands
34. Tsalagiyi Nvdagi Tribe. Based in Waco, Texas.
35. United Chickamaugan
36. United Mascogo Seminole Tribe of Texas. Letter of Intent to Petition 12/31/2002. Receipt of Petition 12/31/2002.
37. The Yanaguana Bands of Mission Indians of Texas. Letter of Intent to Petition 10/19/2004.

=== Utah ===
1. Cherokee Indian Descendents Organization of the Ani-Yun-Wiya
2. Colorado River Band of the Southern Cherokee Nation
3. Nato Indian Nation (Native American Tribal Organization), Provo, UT, also in Texas
4. Northeast Band of Shoshone Indians
5. Rocky Mountain Band of Cherokee Descendents, Magna, UT
6. White Mesa Ute Council, White Mesa, UT

=== Vermont ===
1. Free Cherokee, Tribal Council.
2. Green Mountain Band of Cherokee.
3. Sunray Meditation Society.

=== Virginia ===
1. American Indigenous Accawmacke Indians, Cape Charles, VA
2. Ani-Stohini/Unami Nation, Fries, VA. Letter of Intent to Petition 07/08/1994.
3. Appalachian Cherokee Nation.
4. Buffalo Ridge Cherokees.
5. Cherokee of Virginia Birdtown.
6. Chowanoke Indian Nation, Winton, VA
7. Free Cherokees Spider Clan.
8. Halooie Indian Tribe, Seminary Hill area of Alexandria, VA.
9. Inagel Tsalagi, Cherokee of Virginia.
10. Northern Tsalagi Indian Nation.
11. Rappahannock Indian Tribe (II), Change. Letter of Intent to Petition 01/31/2001. Shares a name with a state-recognized tribe Rappahannock Indian Tribe (I).
12. Roanoke-Chowan Native American Association, Inc., Winton, VA
13. Roanoke-Hatteras Tribe, Dare County, VA
14. Southern Cherokee Confederacy, Pine Log Clan.
15. Turtle Band of Cherokee.
16. United Cherokee Indian Tribe of Virginia, Madison, VA. Letter of Intent to Petition 08/03/2000. Receipt of Petition 07/31/2000.
17. Wicocomico Indian Nation, also the Confederated Tribes of the Wicocomico Indian Nation, Wilsons, VA and Historic Wicocomico Indian Nation of Northumberland County, Virginia. Letter of Intent to Petition 09/15/2000. Receipt of Petition 08/28/2000.
18. Wolf Creek Cherokee Tribe, 501(c)(3) in Henrico County, Virginia
19. Wolf Creek Cherokee Indian Tribe of Virginia. Failed bill introduced to Virginia for state-recognition 1/19/2015

=== Washington ===
1. Anisahani Blue Clan, Woodland, WA
2. Chinook Indian Tribe of Oregon & Washington, Inc., also Chinook Nation, Baycenter, WA. Letter of Intent to Petition 07/23/1979; Declined to acknowledge 7/12/2003, 67 FR 46204. Also in Oregon.
3. Duwamish Indian Tribe. Letter of Intent to Petition 06/07/1977; Declined to Acknowledge 05/08/2002 (66 FR 49966).
4. Free Cherokees, Four Directions Council, Toledo, WA
5. Kikiallus Indian Nation
6. Marietta Band of Nooksacks, Bellingham, WA
7. Mitchell Bay Band of the San Juan Islands
8. Snohomish Tribe of Indians, Port Hadlock, WA. Letter of Intent to Petition 03/13/1975; Declined to Acknowledge 03/05/2004 68 FR 68942.
9. Snoqualmoo Tribe of Whidbey Island, Bellingham, WA. Letter of Intent to Petition 06/14/1988.
10. Southeastern Cherokee Confederacy, Haddock/Compton Clan, Vancouver, WA
11. Steilacoom Tribe of Indians, Steilacoom, WA. Letter of Intent to Petition 08/28/1974; Proposed Finding 02/07/2000. Declined Acknowledgment effective 6/17/2008 73 FR 14833.

=== West Virginia ===
1. Monican Indian Nation, Huntington, WV. Letter of Intent to Petition 8/23/2007.
2. United Cherokee Tribe of West Virginia, Beckley, WV. Letter of Intent to Petition 12/30/2005. Also in Pennsylvania and South Carolina.

=== Wisconsin ===
1. Brothertown Indians of Wisconsin. Letter of Intent to Petition 04/15/1980. declined to acknowledge 2012-12-11
2. Muhheconnuck and Munsee Tribes. Letter of Intent to Petition 06/04/2003.
3. Southern Cherokee Confederacy, Wisconsin.

=== Wyoming ===
1. Northwestern Shoshoni, Rock Springs, WY

=== List of groups self-identifying as Caribbean Indigenous tribes ===
Following is a list of groups known to self-identify as Caribbean Indigenous tribes but that have been recognized neither by the federal government (Bureau of Indian Affairs) nor by any state, territory or tribal government.

==== Puerto Rico ====
1. Concilio Taino Guatu-Ma-Cu A Borikén (Puerto Rico)
2. Jatibonicu Taino Tribal Nation of Borikén. (Puerto Rico).

==== U.S. Virgin Islands ====
1. Opia Carib Indian Tribe in U.S. Virgin Islands (St. Thomas)
2. Carib-Taino Tribal Confederacy

== See also ==
United States

- Federally recognized tribes
- Native Americans in the United States
- List of Alaska Native tribal entities
- List of Indian reservations in the United States
- List of historical Indian reservations in the United States
- National Park Service Native American Heritage Sites
- Outline of United States federal Indian law and policy
- State-recognized tribes in the United States
- Taíno heritage groups

Canada

- List of Indian reserves in Canada
- List of First Nations governments
- List of First Nations peoples
- List of organizations that self-identify as FNIM governments
- Non-status Indian
