= Scuffletown =

Scuffletown may refer to:

- Scuffletown, Bullitt County, Kentucky
- Scuffletown, Henderson County, Kentucky
- Scuffletown, Virginia
- Surry, Virginia, former name
- Scuffletown, North Carolina
