= Scuffletown, Kentucky =

Scuffletown, Kentucky may refer to:

- Scuffletown, Bullitt County, Kentucky
- Scuffletown, Henderson County, Kentucky
