= Talimali Band of Apalachee Indians =

Cultural organization in Louisiana

- Talimali Band of Apalachee Indians of Louisiana
- Talimali Band of Apalachee Indians logo
- Named after: Apalachee people; San Luis de Talimali, a 17th-century Spanish mission
- Formation: 1995
- Founder: Gilmer Bennet
- Type: Nonprofit
- Tax ID no.: EIN 72-1371113
- Location: Pineville, Louisiana, United States
- Official language: English
- Chief: Arthur Bennet
- Secessions: Apalachee Indians Talimali Band
- Revenue: $0 (2018)
- Expenses: 0 (2018)
- Website: talimaliband.com

The Talimali Band of Apalachee Indians, previously called the Apalachee Indians of Louisiana. is one of several cultural heritage organizations of individuals who identify as descendants of the Apalachee people., with about 300 people belonging to the group. The historical Apalachee were a Muskogean language–speaking tribe who lived at the Florida-Georgia border north of the Gulf of Mexico until the beginning of the 18th century.

The Talimali Band of Apalachee Indians is one of more than 400 unrecognized tribes. This organization is neither a federally recognized tribe nor a state-recognized tribe.

This group is not to be confused with the Apalachee Indian Tribe in Alexandria, Louisiana, another unrecognized organization claiming Apalachee identity who also submitted a letter of intent to petition for federal recognition in 1996, or the Apalachee Indians Talimali Band, another nonprofit organization that is based in Stonewall, Louisiana.

The current chief is Arthur Bennet, son of former Chief Gilmer Bennet.

== History and organization ==
=== History ===
==== 18th century ====
Published in 2026, scholar, Kimberly Borchard, writes in La Florida Missions, a chapter on the Talimali Band of Apalachee Indians history, connecting them as descendants of the Apalachee. She writes that they live in Louisiana as descendants from those who escaped multiple waves of genocidal slaving raids that surged southward from the Carolina province in the early 18th century. She further notes that until a few decades ago, leading experts in Florida history and anthropology believed the Apalachee to be extinct.

Borchard writes of the Talimali Band, that they descended from the Apalachee who originally settled in Mobile after English-Native slaving raids between 1702 and 1704, causing refugees to move westward, fleeing Spanish Florida controlled missions. She further writes following Donald Hunter's work, that the Apalachee arrived and lived near Mobilians along with the Tawasa and Chato. This quickly proceeded a yellow fever epidemic that spread to new immigrants, leading to a surge of baptisms for ill Apalachee children. It is written that the Apalachee were devout enough that the then new parish priest complained of their constant demands for sacraments that was further complicated by a language barrier. Louisiana governor, Jean-Baptise Le Moyne de Bienville, also noted their religiosity and capacity for highly skilled labor. Borchard also writes that the Apalachee quickly adopted European manner of dress and French, then met with praise for being "completely civilized."

The Apalachee later petitioned the director general and governor of Louisiana for permission to emigrate to Louisiana, Director General Jean-Jacques Blaise d'Abbadie, observing the Apalachee "were...good farmers and hunters who would be able to support New Orleans." They were eventually allowed to settle "on the Red River where they could also assist boats ascending the river to Natchitoches." Roughly 80 surviving Apalachee moved to New Orleans in late September 1763, and set out to settle on the Red River under their newly elected chief, Martin.

Borchard writes of Hunter's work that in 1985, he claimed that the Red River settlement period lasted over 70 years and was "the final chapter of the Apalachee as a recognizable tribal entity", Borchard, responding to this, claims that "their time on the Red River had for the most part been neglected by the scholarship" and that Hunter describes this period as the "final chapter to Apalachee history." Borchard writes that his research and documentation on this period of time is "painstaking" and that like many of his academic peers, that he remained unaware that the descendants of the 18th and 19th century Apalachee were living in Central Louisiana and struggling to return to their ancestral Florida home.

==== 19th century ====
In a 2003 profile by Tampa Bay Times, the history of the Apalachee tribe is connected to Emmanuel, Louisiana, writing of migratory patterns due to 19th century history involving the destruction of Apalachee homes in the Red River area of Louisiana, including the process of land being sold away voluntarily or "sold out from under them." This was reported to of turned into a land dispute with Isaac Baldwin, Chief Gilmer Bennet remarking he'd "liked to have killed" as Baldwin wrote to the War Department, pleading for the government to remove Apalachee off of what he considered his land. After Baldwin's efforts failed, he began destroying homes and crops of the Apalachee and used his slaves to drive out them out. The Apalachee after this, appealed to Congress for reparations in 1834, which failed, causing the Apalachee to move to Emmanuel and Bayou Cypre.

==== 20th century ====
In 1996, the Talimali Band of Apalachee Indians organized as a 501(c)(3) nonprofit organization, based in Pineville, Louisiana. Arthur R. Bennett was the organization's principal officer and current leads the organization. Zina Lee Spears served as the organization's registered agent.

In the 2003 profile of the Talimali Band Apalachee Indians Chief, Gilmer Bennet, the Tampa Bay Times identifies him and other families with Apalachee ancestry living around Emmanuel, Louisiana and describes the Bennet's lineage, including his maternal ancestor, Frances Vallery, who is also mentioned in the Handbook of North American Indians alongside Bennet. The report writes accounts of Bennet's testimony that the Ku Klux Clan chased his grandfather with dogs and beat him to death, and that his wife, wore long dresses to hide her complexion until she died. According to Bennet, his father, McNeely Bennet, fled to Monroe, Louisiana and married Frances Vallery, an Apalachee woman and had three children. Later in 1940 when he remarried a white woman, McNeely was misidentified as being black which was then a felony.

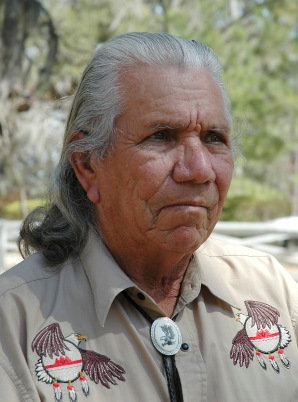
Gilmer Bennett (1932–2015), the late Chief of the Talimali Band of Apalachee

During the trial for his father's remarriage, Gilmer Bennet recalls at age 8 he and his siblings were forced to pull off their shirts so alleged experts could examine their features, Bennet recalling his fathers sorrow during the process. The Jury found McNeely Bennett not guilty on the grounds that he was allegedly white The profile writes that in an affidavit, Bennett said "We could not tell anyone we were Indians, so we would be looked down upon [...] we were just supposed to blend in with the white people although the coloring of our skin proved we were Indian." It is reported that Bennet's aunt Melissa, purposely denied her Indian heritage, forbidding her husband, Thad Kerry, who was white passing and had suspected himself, from telling anyone. Kerry revealed her ethnicity after her death in 1993. The Tampa Bay Times report also noting on their marriage certificate that all questions were answered, except for their race which was left blank.

Reporting in 2004 by The Town Talk identifies Chief Gilmer Bennet, who is reported as saying in the early 20th century his relatives were "killed for sport by the white man"

Borchard writes that it was not until the 1980s that the tribal leadership of the Talimali Band of Apalachee felt secure enough in the Central Louisiana location to publicly reassert their identity.

In 2022, anthropologist, Michelle Pigott identifies the Talimali Band of Apalachee Indians as a descendants community of the Red River Apalachee, and that through the 20th century, faced harassment from the Ku Klux Klan and structural racism of the Jim Crow South, leading many to hide their Indigenous heritage.

==== 21st century ====
In the Handbook of North American Indians by the Smithsonian Institute, Bennet estimated that around 250-300 descendants of the Apalachee were living in Louisiana in 2000.

In 2001, archeologist, Bonnie McEwan, describes the Talimali Band of Apalachee Indians as "still practicing Catholics"; later, archaeologist Stephen Silliman in 2022 describes the tribe as an example of cultural syncretism in Indigenous communities

On October 27, 2001 the Talimali Band of Apalachee Indians is reported by The Town Talk as participating in a mass in honor of Native American tribes.

In 2006, journalist Warren Hayes reported the Talimali Band of Apalachee Indians participating in the annual Native American Mass at St. Francis Xavier Cathedral on November 18 of that year with the tribe participating with other groups including the Adai Caddo, the Clifton Choctaws, Jena Band of Choctaws, Avoyelles Tensas of Marksville, the Four Winds Cherokees, and Tunica-Biloxi with each tribe marching into the church to the rhythm of a tribal drum, and the Talimali Band carrying a white flag with the Queen of Rosary on it, singing songs during the procession and offerings of the mass.

In a reported 2015 obituary for Chief Gilmer Bennet, it is written that he spurred the contemporary awareness of the Apalachee tribe, after contacting a veteran archaeologist who considered the tribe missing for centuries and believed the tribe to of gone hiding in the 1800's.

In 2026, Borchard, while connecting the Talimali Band of Apalchee Indians to the historic Apalachee tribe, writes that the Apalachee "do still exist as a recognizable tribal entity" relating it to "serious implications" for contemporary research on their past, particularly for research after the Apalachee exile from Florida when the diasporic community spent decades in legal uncertainty as they moved from the power of one nation-state to another in Louisiana. She writes that the tribe has created, maintained, and transmitted their heritage and identity since the first European "assualts on their sovereignty" since the early 16th century.

In a statement by the Talimali Band of Apalachee Indians published in Borchard's chapter, they write:

"We, the Talimali Band the Apalachee Indians of Louisiana, are indeed still here. We have been here, waiting for the time our voice will be heard, by people who are willing to help us as a tribe to go home to Florida. We are called to Florida deep within our spirits; we feel the calling to the bone. It is indescribable to visit Florida and see actors dressed as Apalachee portraying us. We see items for sale in a gift shop, which were not made by us. Our time spent in Louisiana has been difficult. Our spirits hurt. Our tribe hid in the deep swamps from 1834 to 1900, when the swamp was drained. [...] We lost our wealth when we lost our land. It is only through the land that our people are connected. For over three hundred years, our people have been refugees fleeing from changing governments and conflicts outside our control. [...] We have one central goal with our mission: we want to be welcomed back to our original land, which calls to us. Our tribal culture and beliefs are strong. We are excited to learn more about our past. We are committed to continue seeking the resources, help, and support that we need to accomplish our goal to come home."

== Recognition efforts ==
Historian Alejandra Dubcovsky writes that the city of Tallahasse and Leon County have recognized the tribe as descendants of the 18th century Apalachees of Florida. She also notes that in a interview, Chief Bennet explains that they "hid out, to survive" and "didn't die out."

Borchard writes in 2026 of the Talimali Band, that they are in a gray area between state and federal recognition, and that while the state of Louisiana has given the band participation in the Louisiana Office of Indian Affairs Scholarship program, it has not granted them tribal recognition. She further writes that this allowance of participation makes "the state's failure to recognize the Apalachee as a tribal entity all the more absurd."

=== State recognition efforts ===
In a 2003 Tampa Bay Times article, state recognition efforts were described, writing that the Louisiana state Senate would not recognize the Apalachee, and that while it acknowledged the history it only wanted to know about casinos. The article writes that some senators did not want Indian casinos competing with the state's, and writes that the state wanted Chief Bennet to sign a pledge promising not to open one for 99 years, however, Bennet refused.

At the suggestion of a staffer for senator, John Breaux, D-La, Bennet and his supporters paid a lawyer $30,000 to write a bill recognizing the tribe; Tampa Bay Times writing that Breaux had yet to produce a bill at that time. A lack of hope for federal recognition was reported due to the then revoking of the Chinook Tribe's federal recognition by the George W. Bush Administration.

=== Federal recognition efforts ===
Borchard writes in 2026, that in 1996, the tribe submitted a letter of intent to petition for reinstatement as a federally recognized tribe and that an application was submitted on August 26, 1997. She writes "despite the well-documented centuries of persecution, dispossession, and murder perpetrated by state and non-state agents alike, according to the criteria set forth by the Bureau of Indian Affairs, it is now incumbent on the Apalachee to prove that they not only exist but "have been identified by reliable external sources on a substantially continuous basis as an Indian entity since 1900." She writes that the tribe possesses an extensive archive of documents confirming their genealogy and land claims, but it has been hard for the tribe to provide abundant ethnic and cultural identity material that they "were forced to render as invisible as possible for over a hundred and fifty years to ensure their very survival." She argues that "the federal requirement that 'reliable external sources' verify the tribe's existence 'on a substantially continuous basis as an Indian entity since 1900'—the height of the Jim Crow era—makes the effort seem doomed from the outset."

The Talimali Band has not submitted a completed petition for federal recognition. Pigott writes that the tribe has support from the State of Florida in its federal recognition efforts.

In the 1990s, anthropologist and professor, Hiram "Pete" Gregory wrote the Bureau of Indian Affairs, that the areas where the Apalachee moved to, Emannuel and Bayou Cypre, at the time had "little or no economic value to the Americans, these were the safest places for Indians to survive" in support of the Talimali Band of Apalachee Indians federal petition efforts. McEwan in 2001 described a "recent application" for federal recognition that was based largely on parish records.

The 2003 Tampa Bay Times article noted that for the Talimali Band of Apalachee, politicians were only worried about casinos.

Borchard writes, that the Talimali Band of Aplachee Indians are alive but lacking millions of dollars potentially needed to litigate the tribes case before Congress and the Bureau of Indian Affairs. She writes that after federal efforts initiated in the 1970s geared towards "supporting tribal self-governance" and "limiting the role of the BIA" were established, that this "compounded the woes of the Apalachee." She asserts that although the creation of protocol for awarding federal tribal recognition was needed as a step in the right direction, she also quotes Denise Bates, saying that "the process met much criticism because of its stringent criteria that rely on documentation that many groups, particularly in the South, lack." Borchard continues and writes that the Apalachee had been forced to hide in lands considered unfit for human habitation following the loss of land, and that they were effectively bureaucratically erased following the disappearance of the Apalachee from federal census records following the withdrawal of the last Indian agent in 1834.

== Legal history ==
=== 2000s ===
In 2005, the American Press reported that the Talimali Band of Apalachee Indians of Louisiana was demanding 250 million dollars from the Coushatta Tribe who were operating a casino near Kinder, Louisiana for reasons of alleged blocking of the Talimali Band's efforts to gain federal recognition. The attorney representing the Talimali Band, Warren D. Rush, gave the Coushatta Tribe until April 22 of that year to pay or face a lawsuit. The attorney, Terry Scarborough, representing the Coushatta tribal chairman, Lovelin Ponco and council member, William Worfel, and Leonard Battise, responded to Rush's demand in an April 22 letter saying:

Let me get this straight. Two newspaper articles claim that a lost Indian tribe everyone believed to be extinct was suddenly discovered in Central Louisiana. Two other newspaper articles claim that my clients...were grossly cheated by (Michael) Scanlon and (Jack) Adramoff. You, therefore, add two and two, arrive at five, and have the effrontery to issue a $250 million demand accusing the Coushattas of blocking your lost tribe's efforts at federal recognition?"

Further reporting in the same article describes that Abramoff was the Coushattas' lobbyist and Scanlon was their public relations consultant, and that the two were paid over $32 million by the Coushattas over three years; at the time at the center of two federal investigations for dealing with multiple Indian tribes, including the Coushattas. In one of two demand letters sent by Rush, it is reported he claimed that the Coushattas thwarted the Talimali Band's attempts of federal recognition by "possible fraudulent activities" and as a result of damages, the Talimali Band wanted $250 million. Scarborough is reported to of rejected Rush's payment demand due to what he called "factual and legal merit." In one of Rush's demand letters, he allegedly planned to depose at least 22 people to "learn much more about what you and other conspirators have done."

Scarborough is reported as being "amazed" at Rush trying to demand $250 million, and believed that Rush was working with "dissident" tribal council members, Harold John, David Sickey, and "outsiders" who were tribal and non tribal in an attempt to influence upcoming tribal elections "for their own financial gain" and power; the tribal elections for Poncho and Battise, set for at the time, next month at the time of reporting. Scarborough was reported as then reviewing state law to determine if Rush's demand was illegal, remarking that "frivolous lawsuits" in Louisiana are "sanctionable."

=== 2020s ===
In 2020, Troy Kerry, chief and chairman of the Apalachee Indians Talimali Band, sued the Talimali Band of the Apalachee Indians in Chief Troy Kerry v. Talimali Band of the Apalachee Indians in the USPTO Trademark Trial and Appeal Board, case no. 92074759-CAN. In 2021, the organization countersued in Talimali Band the Apalachee Indians of Louisiana v. Apalachee Indians Talimali Band et al in the US District Court for the Western District of Louisiana.

== Activities ==
Officials from the Talimali Band of the Apalachee participated in the inaugural Supreme Chiefs Council that met in Oakdale, Louisiana, in 2020.

== See also ==
- List of organizations that self-identify as Native American tribes
- Apalachee Indians Talimali Band
