= Matinecock (disambiguation) =

The Matinecock were an Eastern Algonquian–speaking Indigenous people of Long Island.

Matinecock may also refer to:

- Matinecock, New York, a village in Nassau County
- Matinecock Tribal Nation, a self-identified Native American tribe
