= Pocasset Wampanoag Tribe of the Pokanoket Nation =

Cultural nonprofit organizations in New England

- Named after: Pocasset and Pokanoket, two villages and bands of Wampanoag people
- Formation: 2017
- Founded at: Cranston, Rhode Island
- Type: nonprofit organization
- Tax ID no.: EIN 82-2650017
- Purpose: Land Resources Conservation (C34)
- Headquarters: Cranston, Rhode Island
- Location: United States
- Members: More than 200 (2010)
- Official language: English
- Principal Officer: Duane Shepard Sr.
- Subsidiaries: Pocasset Pokanoket Land Trust, Inc.
- Website: pocassetpokanoket.com

The Pocasset Wampanoag Tribe of the Pokanoket Nation is one of several cultural heritage organizations of individuals who identify as descendants of the Wampanoag people in Rhode Island. They formed a nonprofit organization, the Pocasset Pokanoket Land Trust, Inc., in 2017.

The Pocasset Wampanoag Tribe of the Pokanoket Nation is an unrecognized organization. Despite having the word "nation" in their name, this organization is neither a federally recognized tribe nor a state-recognized tribe.

They should not be confused with other unrecognized tribes, such as the Pocasset Wampanoag Tribe of Massachusetts and Rhode Island; the Pokanoket/Wampanoag Federation, based in Warwick, Rhode Island; the Pocasset Wampanoag Indian Tribe in Cheshire, Connecticut; or the Pokanoket Nation, based in Millbury, Massachusetts, and Bristol, Rhode Island.

The Mashpee Wampanoag Tribe, one of the only two federally recognized Wampanoag tribes, states that they, the Mashpee, are the only descendants of the historical Pokanoket people.

== Nonprofit organization ==
Members of the Pocasset Wampanoag Tribe of the Pokanoket Nation registered the Pocaseet Pokanoket Land Trust, Inc., as a nonprofit corporation in 2017. Leslie S. Rich, Esq., of Cranston, Rhode Island, is the registered agent.

The directors include:

- Chairman: George Spring "Buffalo"
- Vice chairman: Daryl "Black Eagle" Jamieson
- Leslie S. Rich.

== Land claims ==
The organization owns more than 424 acres in Fall River, Massachusetts, and Freetown, Massachusetts. They claim the Watuppa Reservation, the public access area of 8,500 acres owned by the City of Fall River.

== Activities ==
Daryl "Black Eagle" Jamieson, who identifies as a Clan Chief of the Pocasset Wampanoag Tribe of the Pokanoket Nation, is drum director of the Eastern Medicine Singers, runs the Eastern Medicine Cultural LLC, and Black Eagle Productions.

== See also ==
- List of organizations that self-identify as Native American tribes
