= Kaweah Indian Nation, Inc. =

Nonprofit organization

- Named after: Yokuts word
- Formation: 1980
- Founded at: Porterville, California
- Type: Nonprofit, unrecognized tribe
- Registration no.: EIN 94-2737435 (CA)
- Location: Wichita, Kansas (2005–08), United States of America
- Chief: Malcolm Webber, "Chief Thunderbird IV" Webber

The Kaweah Indian Nation, Inc. was a fraudulent organization that falsely claimed to be an unrecognized tribe from the 1980s to the early 2000s. It appropriated the name of the Kaweah people but had no legitimate connection to any historical Native American group. The organization applied for federal recognition in the 1980s, but its petition was denied.

The organization became known for fraudulent activities, including selling fake tribal memberships to undocumented Mexican nationals under the false pretense that such documents conferred citizenship in the United States. Its leader, Malcolm Webber, who referred to himself as 'Grand Chief Thunderbird IV,' was convicted on six felony charges related to the scheme and sentenced to prison in 2008.

== Petition for federal recognition ==
The Kaweah Indian Nation, based in California at the time, petitioned the US federal government for federal recognition. In 1985, their petition was denied. The proposed finding stated: "The Kaweah Indian, Inc. is a recently formed group that did not exist prior to 1980. ... The KIN is primarily an urban Indian group in Porterville, California, which has no relation to the aboriginal Kaweah Indians and did not evolve from a tribal entity...."

== Nonprofit ==
The group formed a nonprofit organization in Porterville, California, but their nonprofit status was revoked in 2011 not failing to file taxes for three consecutive years.

The group also formed a nonprofit in Wichita, Kansas, in 2005 but dissolved in 2008.
