= Montauk Tribe of Indians =

Cultural organization in Long Island, New York

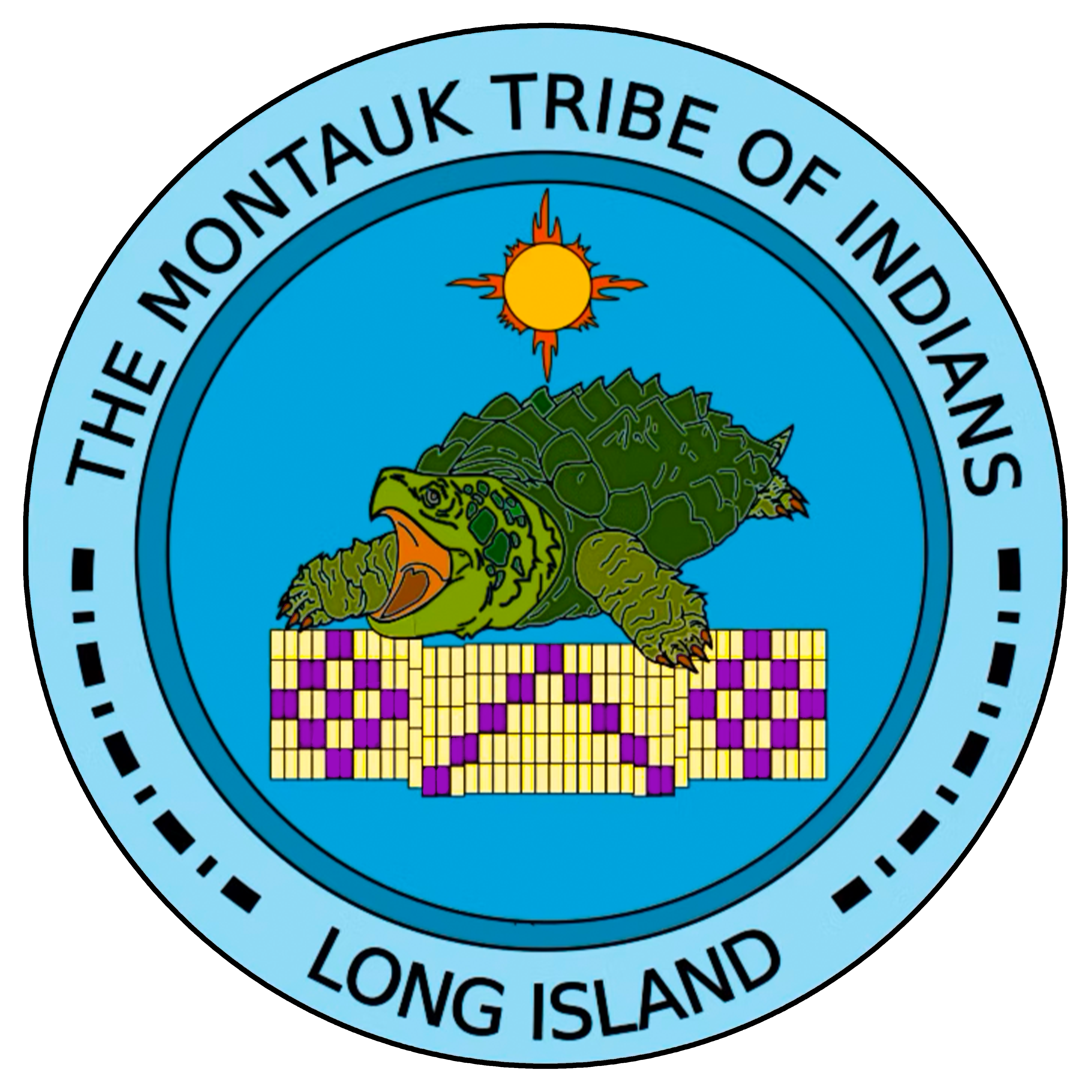
- Seal of the Montaukett Tribe of Indians
- Nickname: Montauk Indian Nation
- Named after: Montaukett
- Type: 501(c)(3) Public Charity
- Tax ID no.: EIN: 87-2078087
- Headquarters: Amityville, New York
- Location: United States
- Official language: English
- President: Daryl Smith
- Website: www.onemontauknation.org

The Montauk Tribe of Indians, also known as the Montauk Indian Nation, is a nonprofit organization that self-identifies as a Native American tribe but is not recognized as a tribe by the federal government or by any state government.

== Status ==
There is one federally recognized tribe on Long Island, the Shinnecock Indian Nation, as well as one state-recognized tribe, the Unkechaug Nation. The Montauk Tribe of Indians does not have recognition from either the state of New York or the federal government.

=== Attempts at state recognition ===
As of 2025, bills passed by the New York State Legislature that would have granted state recognition as a tribe to the Montauk Tribe of Indians have been vetoed seven times by a Governor of New York. Four of the vetoes were from Governor Kathy Hochul and three were vetoed by Andrew Cuomo.

=== Petition for federal recognition ===
The Montauk Indian Nation filed a letter of intent to petition for federal recognition on July 31, 1995.

== Nonprofit organization ==
The Montauk Tribe of Indians Fund Inc. is incorporated as a 501(c)(3) public charity located in Amityville, New York.

In 2024, the fund's administration was as follows.

- President: Daryl Smith
- Vice President: Dean Smith
- Secretary: Joan Coleman
- Treasurer: Gail Boyd
- Consultant: Matthew Beaudet

== See also ==
- List of organizations that self-identify as Native American tribes
- Native American recognition in the United States
