= Taíno heritage groups =

Organizations that promote Taíno identity

Taíno heritage groups or Taíno organizations are organizations, primarily located in the United States and the Caribbean, that promote Taíno identity or revivalism. Many of these groups are from non-sovereign U.S. territories outside the contiguous United States, especially Puerto Rico and the Virgin Islands. Groups outside the 48 contiguous states and Alaska (Note: The federal government defines Indigenous peoples as "native to the continental United States" and states that Native Americans (American Indians and Alaska Natives) must "come from within the continental U.S. at the time of first sustained contact, rather than migrating into the U.S. during historical times". The continental U.S. is defined as "the contiguous 48 states and Alaska". The Tlinga and Haida Indian Tribes of Alaska outline the law as such: "In 1934, the Indian Reorganization Act (IRA) was passed to set a standard for the federal government to recognize tribes in the Lower 48. The Alaska Native Brotherhood petitioned Congress to amend the IRA to apply to Alaska, and in 1936 the revision was made.") are currently ineligible for federal recognition. Some of these groups are represented on the International Indian Treaty Council under the United Confederation of Taíno People, which has campaigned nationally and at the United Nations for the United States to recognize such groups.

== Jamaica ==
- Yamaye Guani Council

== United States ==
- Higuayagua Taino People of the Caribbean Organization
- Jatibonicu Taino Tribal Nation
- United Confederation of Taíno People

== See also ==
- Taíno
