= Northern Narragansett Tribe =

Unrecognized tribe in Rhode Island

Northern Narragansett Indian Tribe of Rhode Island
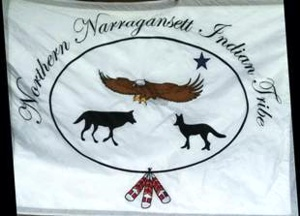
- Northern Narragansett Flag
- Predecessor: Narragansett people
- Formation: 2010
- Type: Nonprofit, Unrecognized tribe
- Tax ID no.: EIN 65-1306378
- Purpose: Education N.E.C. (B99)
- Location: Providence, Rhode Island, United States of America
- Members: 500
- Official language: English
- Principal Officer: Otis Bliss
- Website: narragansettindiannation.org

The Northern Narragansett Indian Tribe of Rhode Island is an unrecognized tribe in Rhode Island, founded by formerly enrolled members of the federally recognized Narragansett Tribe, who were removed from the tribal rolls in the group removals of 1993 and 2006. The tribe acquired 501(c)(3) status in 2010.

== History ==
The first group removal of Narragansett tribal members occurred in 1993, where 91 members were removed. Among the removed was the future founder and sachem of the Northern Narragansett, Otis Bliss. In 2006 another 119 were removed, including Yvette Champlain who was a tribal council member at the time. Champlain claims that the removals were based on greed, and were intended to prevent the removed from receiving tribal and federal money. Scholars and activists see this as a national trend among tribes, prompted by a variety of factors, including internal family rivalries and the issue of significant new revenues from Indian casinos. Those who had been removed in 1993 had been petitioning for re-enrollment for the last decade to no avail, and when the 2006 removal occurred, it served as a catalyst for an organization to be formed with these newly removed members, in order to attempt to reassert their status as American Indians.

The organization was formed in 2006 largely under the leadership of Otis Bliss. Their first meeting was held on November 18, 2006, and the tribe was incorporated on February 15, 2007. They have not been recognized by the federal nor any state government.

== Government ==
The organization is headquartered in Providence, Rhode Island. The tribal council, formed in 2007, consists of general councillors, and several different offices: Sachem (occupied by Otis Bliss since founding), First Council, Second Council, Prophet, Medicine Person, and Genealogist.

== Membership ==
The organization has about 500 enrolled members. Membership is based on lineal descent from any individual recognized by the organization as Narragansett. They do not limit their membership solely to descendants of the 1880 Narragansett Roll, unlike the federally recognized tribe. The verification process, although relatively less critical than that of the federally recognized tribe, still checks the relationships stated and looks at birth certificates as proof.

Its members are relatively low income, having been heavily reliant on tribal benefits before their expulsion from the federally recognized tribe. As there are no Narragansett of nonmixed ancestry left, members have a large portion of typically either European or African ancestry, along with Narragansett ancestry.

== See also ==
- Tribal disenrollment
- Cherokee Freedmen
- Nooksack people disenrollment controversy.
- Pechanga Band of Luiseño Indians membership and disenrollment
- Native American reservation politics
