= Pokanoket Nation =

Cultural nonprofit organizations in Massachusetts and Rhode Island

- Council of Seven & Royal House of Pokanoket & Pokanoket Tribe & Wampanoag Corporation
- Named after: Pokanoket, a Wampanoag village
- Formation: 1994
- Founded at: Millbury, Massachusetts
- Type: nonprofit organization
- Tax ID no.: EIN 05-0474463
- Purpose: Ethnic/Immigrant Services (P84}
- Headquarters: Bristol, Rhode Island
- Location: United States
- Members: 200–250 (2017)
- Official language: English
- Chief/Sagamore: William Guy, aka Po Wauipi Neimpaug
- President: Michael S. Weeden
- Website: pokanokettribe.org
- Formerly called: Pokanoket Tribe of the Wampanoag Nation

The Pokanoket Nation, also known as the Pokanoket Tribe, is one of several cultural heritage organizations of individuals who identify as descendants of the Wampanoag people in Rhode Island and Massachusetts. They formed a nonprofit organization called the Council of Seven & Royal House of Pokanoket & Pokanoket Tribe & Wampanoag Corporation in 1994.

The Pokanoket Nation is an unrecognized organization. They are neither a federally recognized tribe nor a state-recognized tribe.

In 2015, they dropped "Wampanoag" from their name. They should not be confused with other unrecognized heritage groups, such as the Pokanoket/Wampanoag Federation, based in Warwick, Rhode Island; Pocasset Wampanoag Tribe of the Pokanoket Nation, based in Auburn, Massachusetts, and Providence, Rhode Island; or the Pocasset Wampanoag Tribe of the Pokanoket Nation in Cranston, Rhode Island.

Their chief or sagamore, William Guy, is also known as Po Wauipi Neimpaug. Guy claims descent from Massasoit.

The Narragansett Indian Tribe, the only federally recognized tribe in Rhode Island, does not recognize the Pokanoket Nation as a Native American tribe. The Mashpee Wampanoag Tribe, one of the only two federally recognized Wampanoag tribes, states the Mashpee are the descendants of the historical Pokanoket people.

== Leadership ==
As of May 2025, the leadership of the Pokanoket Tribe included:

- Sagamore: William Guy
- Chief Sachem: Tracey Dancing Star
- Sachem: Toni Marie Walmsley
- Sachem: Harry Edmonds
- Council Member: Don Brown Jr.
- Council Member: Kelly Harden
- Council Member: Elsie Morrison

== Nonprofit organization ==
The Council of Seven & Royal House of Pokanoket & Pokanoket Tribe & Wampanoag Corporation registered as a nonprofit corporation in 1994. Michael S. Weeden of Millbury, Massachusetts, is the registered agent.

The officers are:

- President: Michael S. Weeden
- Vice President: Lauri Groh-Germin
- Treasurer: Craig Martin
- Secretary: Krista Viera

== Status ==
=== Petition for federal recognition ===
In 1994, Clifford Guy of Bristol, Rhode Island, sent a letter of intent to petition for federal recognition on behalf of the Pokanoket Tribe of the Wampanoag Nation, but no documented petition has been submitted by the group.

=== Honorary resolution ===
In May 2025, the Rhode Island Senate publicly honored the Pokanoket Tribe with a resolution RI S1034 (2025) that "honors the tribe's ancestors and living descendants." A group of 24 members of the Pokanoket Tribe gathered in the senate chambers to observe the resolution's passing.

== Land claims ==
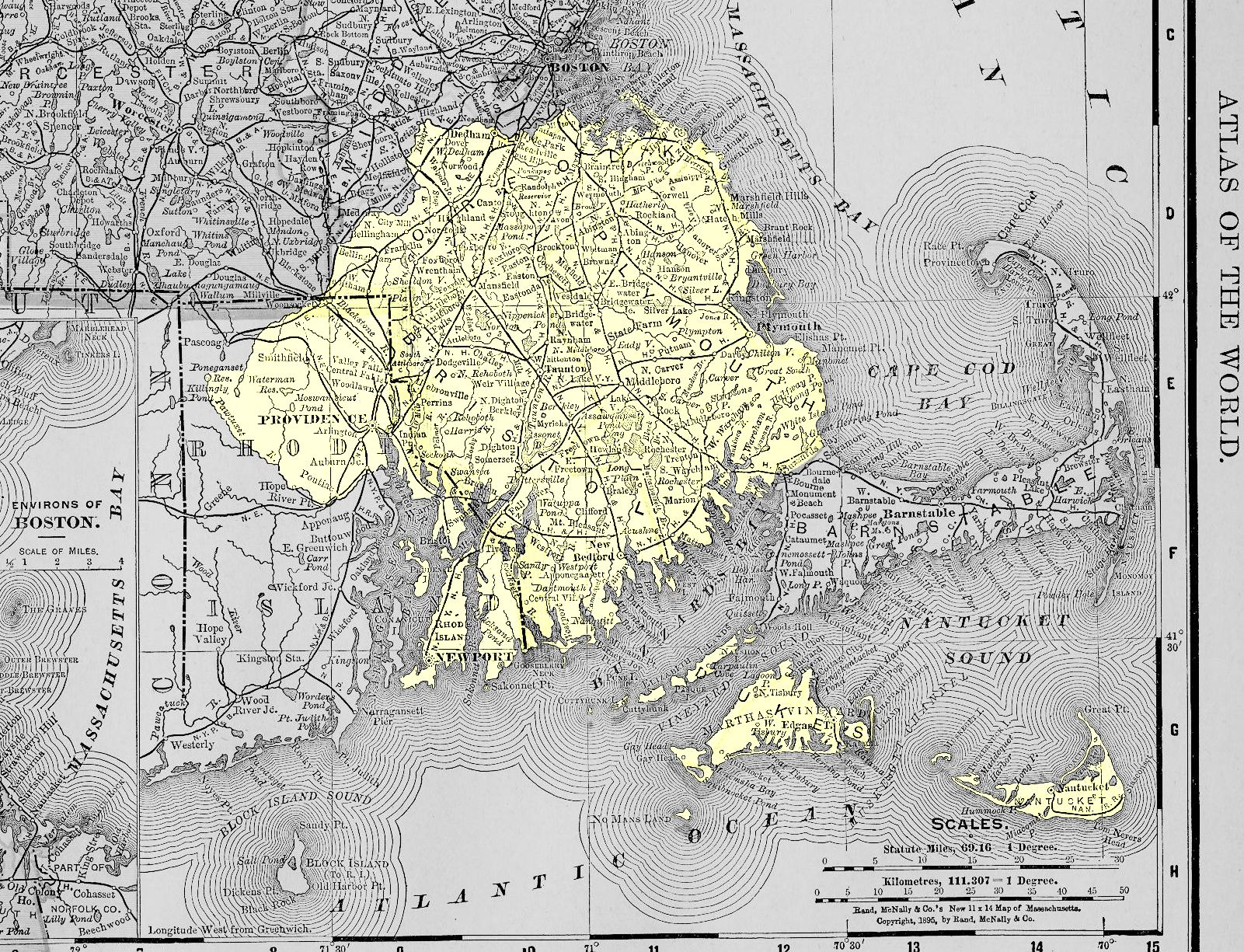
Territory claimed by the Pokanoket Tribe of the Wampanoag Nation

In 1996, Paul Weeden, an early organizer for the group and cousin of William Guy, requested that Brown University give a parcel of land at Mount Hope to the organization.

The Pokanoket Tribe of the Wampanoag Nation publicly voiced opposition to the Mohegan Tribe building a casino in Massachusetts and said the proposed site is on their ancestral homelands.

The Pokanoket Nation demonstrated at Brown University in 2016, then held an encampment and set up a roadblock, claiming that the campus land belonged to them as the heirs of the Wampanoag people at Pokanoket. Brown University transferred part of its Mount Hope property in Bristol, Rhode Island, to a preservation trust established by the Pokanoket Nation. This land, approximately 255 acres, is historically and culturally significant as the ancestral home of Metacomet (King Philip), a leader of the Pokanoket people, and the site of his death during King Philip's War in 1676.

The transfer fulfills a commitment made in 2017 following an encampment on the property, aimed at ensuring the land's preservation and sustainable access for Native tribes and community organizations connected to its history. The deed ensures perpetual "access to the lands and waters of the Property to all members of all Tribes historically part of the Pokanoket Nation/Confederacy, and to all members of the Wampanoag Tribe of Gay Head (Aquinnah), the Mashpee Wampanoag Tribe, the Assonet Band of the Wampanoag Nation, the Herring Pond Wampanoag Tribe and the Pocasset Tribe of the Pokanoket Nation.”

== Activities ==
The Pokanoket Nation is a member of the Federation of Aboriginal Nations of the Americas (FANA), an advocacy group based in Pawtucket, Rhode Island, comprising nine organizations that are not recognized as Native American tribes.

In 2017, they protested the repatriation of grave goods belonging to Massasoit to the Mashpee Wampanoag, Aquinnah Wampanoag, and the Assonet Band of Wampanoag.

== See also ==
- List of organizations that self-identify as Native American tribes
