= Apalachee Indians Talimali Band =

Cultural organization in Louisiana

- Apalachee Indians Talimali Band
- Named after: Apalachee people; San Luis de Talimali, a 17th-century Spanish mission
- Formation: 2022
- Type: nonprofit organization
- Tax ID no.: EIN 84-3710212
- Purpose: Arts and culture; Fund Raising and/or Fund Distribution (A12)
- Location: Stonewall, Louisiana, United States
- Official language: English
- President: Troy Kerry
- Parent organization: Talimali Band of Apalachee Indians
- Revenue: $5,761 (2024)
- Expenses: $4,961 (2024)
- Website: apalacheetalimaliband.com

The Apalachee Indians Talimali Band is one of several cultural heritage organizations of individuals who identify as descendants of the Apalachee people. The historical Apalachee were a Muskogean language–speaking tribe who lived at the Florida-Georgia border north of the Gulf of Mexico until the beginning of the 18th century.

The Apalachee Indians Talimali Band is one of more than 400 unrecognized tribes. This organization is neither a federally recognized tribe nor a state-recognized tribe.

This group is not to be confused with the Apalachee Indian Tribe in Alexandria, Louisiana, another unrecognized organization claiming Apalachee identity who also submitted a letter of intent to petition for federal recognition in 1996, or the Talimali Band of Apalachee Indians, another nonprofit organization that is based in Pineville, Louisiana.

== History and organization ==
In 2022, the Apalachee Indians Talimali Band incorporated as a 501(c)(3) nonprofit organization, based in Stonewall, Louisiana. Troy Kerry is the organization's principal officer.

== Recognition efforts ==
=== State recognition refforts ===
In 2019, Senator Gerald Long introduced Louisiana Senate Concurrent Resolution 9, titled "Recognizes the Apalachee Indians' Talimali Band as a tribe in the state of Louisiana," which died in committee that same year.

This organization tried and failed to gain state recognition from Louisiana in 2022.

Regarding the band's attempts to receive state recognition, Louisiana State Senator Louie Bernard stated: "All of us have this lingering thing that we’ve had forever, that anybody that seeks recognition and in this fashion has another motive in mind. And we all know what that is. But I guess I’m just naive enough to believe that some of these tribes really are not interested in that. They are interested solely in having the pride of having been recognized by their state as who they say they are."

== Legal issues ==
In 2020, Troy Kerry, chief and chairman of the Apalachee Indians Talimali Band, sued the Talimali Band of the Apalachee Indians in Chief Troy Kerry v. Talimali Band of the Apalachee Indians in the USPTO Trademark Trial and Appeal Board, case no. 92074759-CAN. In 2021, the organization countersued in Talimali Band the Apalachee Indians of Louisiana v. Apalachee Indians Talimali Band et al in the US District Court for the Western District of Louisiana.

== Activities ==
The Apalachee Indians Talimali Band hosts an annual powwow. Troy Kerry spoke on a panel "Native American Legacies" at the bicentennial celebration of Tallahassee, Florida, in 2024.

== See also ==
- List of organizations that self-identify as Native American tribes
