= Marietta Band of Nooksacks =

The Marietta Band of Nooksacks are an unrecognized group of Nooksack people in Whatcom County, Washington.

They are not part of the federally recognized tribe known as the Nooksack, who are based in Whatcom County. They have a nearly 3200-acre land base, much of it held by the federal government as trust land.

== See also ==
- Marietta, Washington
- List of organizations that self-identify as Native American tribes
