= Herod, Illinois =

- Unincorporated community
- Location within Illinois Location within the United States
- Coordinates: 37°34′49″N 88°26′10″W
- Country: United States
- State: Illinois
- County: Pope
- Elevation: 427 ft (130 m)
- Time zone: UTC-6 (Central (CST))
  - Summer (DST): UTC-5 (CDT)
- ZIP code: 62947
- Area code: 618
- GNIS feature ID: 424976

Herod is an unincorporated community in Pope County, Illinois, United States. Herod is located on Illinois Route 34 at the edge of the Shawnee National Forest. Herod has a post office with ZIP code 62947.

A cultural heritage group and nonprofit organization, the Vinyard Indian Settlement, is based in Herod.
