= Ridgetop Shawnee =

Cultural heritage group in Kentucky, U.S.

Ridgetop Shawnee Tribe of Indians, LLC Pine Mountain Indian Community
- Nickname: Ridgetop Shawnee, Ridgetop Band of Shawnee Indians
- Named after: Shawnee people
- Formation: January 22, 2009; 17 years ago
- Founder: William Hayes Shackleford
- Dissolved: September 10, 2011; 15 years ago
- Type: limited liability corporation
- Tax ID no.: 0721940 (LLC)
- Legal status: inactive
- Official language: English
- Website: ridgetopshawnee.net

The Ridgetop Shawnee Tribe of Indians is a cultural heritage organization and was nonprofit organization and limited liability company (now inactive) based in Kentucky, U.S.

The band is unrecognized as a tribe and is not a federally recognized tribe or a state-recognized tribe.

The organization was founded in 2009.

== Nonprofit organization ==
William Hayes Shackleford founded the Ridgetop Shawnee Tribe of Indians, LLC, as a limited liability company and nonprofit organization, based in Hazard, Kentucky, in 2009. The organization went inactive but became active again in 2021, with Jeffery R. Morgan serving as its registered agent.

Shackleford organized the Pine Mountain Indian Community, Kentucky LLC in 2013, another nonprofit limited liability company in Hazard, Kentucky. This organization dissolved in September 2015. Morgan also served as this organization's registered agent.

== Status, recognition, and identity ==
In March 2023, the Cultural Preservation Department of the Tribal Historic Preservation Office of the Absentee Shawnee Tribe described ""a concerning phenomenon we are witnessing in our ancestral settlement areas in our ancestral settlement areas including but not limited to Ohio, Kentucky, West Virginia, Indiana, [and] Alabama", commenting that "In these areas, there are a number of people who claim Shawnee ancestry; this is not so much the concern as the fact that some of these individuals or groups use this claim to exploit Shawnee culture as a means of gaining opportunities for themselves from a public that is largely unaware of the vast divide that separates our tribal community politically and culturally from those of alleged Shawnee ancestry", and went on to name the Ridgetop Shawnee as one of the ten similar groups they "have identified that have recently organized as alleged Shawnee bands/tribes and promote themselves as the voice of the Shawnee."

While the Commonwealth of Kentucky has a Native American Heritage Commission, Kentucky has no state-recognized tribes and "the state doesn’t have a process for them to apply for formal recognition". However, some of the public mistakenly believe that the Ridgetop Shawnee are state-recognized.

The Kentucky House of Representatives passed Joint Resolution 15 in 2009 and Joint Resolution 16 in 2010 as congratulatory resolutions to "Commend the Ridgetop Shawnee Tribe of Indians for their efforts to help their elderly and their youth; recognize their work to preserve their native language and heritage."

== See also ==
- Absentee-Shawnee Tribe of Indians of Oklahoma
- Eastern Shawnee Tribe of Oklahoma
- Shawnee Tribe
- Southern Cherokee Nation of Kentucky – another non-recognized tribe in Kentucky
