= Seaconke Wampanoag Tribe =

Cultural nonprofit organizations in Massachusetts and Rhode Island

Seaconke Wampanoag Tribe and Seaconke Wampanoag Inc.
- Named after: Seekonk, Massachusetts (named for a Narragansett sachem), Wampanoag people
- Formation: 1997
- Founded at: Cranston, Rhode Island
- Dissolved: April 18, 2018; 8 years ago
- Type: nonprofit organization
- Tax ID no.: EIN 05-0503360, EIN 04-3345716
- Purpose: Seaconke Wampanoag Tribe–Wampanoag Nation: Ethnic/Immigrant Services (P84); Seaconke Wampanoag: A11: Arts, Culture and Humanities Single Organization Support
- Headquarters: Providence, Rhode Island
- Location: Warwick, Rhode Island, United States
- Official language: English
- Chief: Darrell Waldron
- Revenue: $-2,105 (2020)
- Expenses: $9.281 (2020)
- Website: seaconkewampanoag.org

The Seaconke Wampanoag Tribe is a cultural heritage organization for individuals who identify as descendants of the Wampanoag people in Rhode Island and Massachusetts. Two nonprofit organizations were formed to represent its members: Seaconke Wampanoag, Inc. formed in 1997, operates in Massachusetts, and is still active; Seaconke Wampanoag Tribe–Wampanoag Nation, Inc. operated from 1998–2018 in Rhode Island.

The Seaconke Wampanoag Tribe is not recognized either as a federally recognized tribe or a state-recognized tribe as yet, though efforts are ongoing. In 1997, the Massachusetts Commission on Indian Affairs issued a letter "reaffirming the Recognition of the Seaconke Wampanoag people". The executive director of the Commonwealth of Massachusetts, John "Slow Turtle" Peters (Mashpee Wampanoag, c. 1929–1997), also signed the document "Recognition and Reaffirmation of the Seaconke Wampanoag Tribe" in 2021. The group has campaigned for recognition in Rhode Island, gaining support from across the legislature, but the governor has rejected the proposals. Claire Richards, executive counsel to the Governor of Rhode Island, said: "Rhode Island state government does not currently have the resources to make accurate determinations about tribal existence."

Early leaders of the group included Wilfred "Eagle Heart" Greene (1937–2016) and Lois "Lulu" Viera Chaffee (1941–2021) of Seekonk, Massachusetts. Researchers at the Genographic Project said they could trace the Seaconke Wampanoag Tribe's history back to the 18th century, to communities that emerged from the intermarriage of colonial European families, a Cherokee paternal ancestor, and Seaconke Wampanoag descendants in Bristol County, Massachusetts, where they worked on farms into the 20th century. According to the Seaconke Wampanoag Tribe, its members descend from Annawan, a Wampanoag leader who died in 1676, and Massasoit's band.

== Name ==
Seaconke is spelled in many different ways and is the name of a town, Seekonk, Massachusetts, and the Seekonk River, near Providence, Rhode Island. It also means "home of the black (or wild) goose". The placename comes from the name of a 17th-century Narragansett sachem (leader). The Wampanoag are an Algonquian language-speaking Native American tribe in New England. Wampanoag means "Eastern people" or "people of the light" in this language.

== History ==
According to the Seaconke Wampanoag Tribe, its history dates back to the 17th century; some members report descent from Wampanoag leader Annawan and Massasoit's band. Researchers from the Genographic Project, Zhadanov et al., have said that the Seaconke Wampanoag Tribe's history can be traced to at least the early 18th century.

Following decimation of the Wampanoag tribes through disease, slavery, and war, the survivors (primarily women) married African slaves and, especially later on, European settlers. The colonists forbade Wampanoags from gathering, from using the Massachusetts language, or from using their tribal names.

The descendants of these people continued to farm lands in Bristol County, Massachusetts into the 20th century. In 1925, the First Free Methodist Church was built by the community in Seekonk, Massachusetts, where many of the families reportedly had Indigenous heritage. Records from 1924 and 1975 describe a Seaconke Wampanoag community at that location since before its creation.

In October 1996, the Seaconke Wampanoag Tribe announced its intention to form a new tribal organization. In February 1997, members of Wampanoag groups gathered on the Seaconke Plain to celebrate, which Zhananov et al. describe as the first Wampanoag public assembly in 321 years. According to Zhananov et al., the group has retained traditional cultural practices and events over the course of its history.

== Organization ==
The Seaconke Wampanoag Tribe announced it would form an organization to represent its members in October 1996. Willie "Eagle Heart" Green founded two organizations to represent the Seaconke Wampanoag: Seaconke Wampanoag, Inc. and Seaconke Wampanoag Tribe–Wampanoag Nation, Inc.

In 1997, Greene organized Seaconke Wampanoag, Inc as a 501(c)(3) nonprofit organization in Cranston, Rhode Island, with its activities taking place in Seekonk, Massachusetts. The group was initially led by Greene and then George "Silverwolf" Jennings. It is currently under the leadership of Darrell Waldron. Michael Markley is the chair of the organization's historical commission, Monique Poirier is the secretary, and Robert Harris is treasurer. The group offers two forms of membership: the first is for those who can trace their lineage to community members listed in 1925; the second is for those with an interest in the non-profit's activities but who cannot prove such descent. In 2024, they had assets of $538,006.

From 1998–2018, the Seaconke Wampanoag Tribe–Wampanoag Nation was a 501(c)(3) nonprofit organization based in Warwick, Rhode Island, also led by Greene. Greene was still listed as president after his death in 2016. This organization's nonprofit status was revoked in 2018 due to failure to file annual reports, and it is no longer registered with the IRS.

== Land ==
In Greene v. Rhode Island (2003), Wilfred W. Greene sued Rhode Island and the towns of Cumberland and Woonsocket in U.S. District Court, claiming 34-square miles of land near the Blackstone River. The case was dismissed.

In 2008, Patrick and Gail Conley donated a 6.7-acre lot in Cumberland, Rhode Island, to the Seaconke Wampanoag Tribe, in the care of Wilfred W. Greene. After hearing about a group of homeless people living under a bridge in Providence, Greene invited them to live temporarily on his land. The land, part of the Peterson/Puritan, Inc. site, was later designated a contaminated superfund site by the EPA, which required rehousing the homeless people living there.

== Petition for federal recognition ==
Wilfred Green sent a letter of intent to petition for federal recognition as a Native American tribe on behalf of the Seaconke Wampanoag Tribe, then based in Greenwich, Rhode Island, in 1998. The Seaconke Wampanoag Tribe never submitted a completed petition for federal recognition.

== Proposed state-recognition ==
The Seaconke Wampanoag Tribe has around 500 members split between two states. 280 of its members reportedly live in Rhode Island; the remainder live in Massachusetts. Despite this, Rhode Island currently has no process for state-recognition and therefore has no state-recognized tribes. The Seaconke Wampanoag Tribe is a member of the National Congress of American Indians, which lists it as "state recognized" and part of the Northeast Region.

In 2021, John "Slow Turtle" Peters (Mashpee Wampanoag, ca. 1929–1997), executive director of the Commonwealth of Massachusetts, signed the document "Recognition and Reaffirmation of the Seaconke Wampanoag Tribe". The Commission on Indian Affairs, created as an advisory body to the Commonwealth in 1974, has also published a letter "reaffirming the Recognition of the Seaconke Wampanoag people".

In 2021, Rhode Island State Representative Camille Vella-Wilkinson introduced House Bill 5385 for state recognition of the Seaconke Wampanoag Tribe, which did not pass the committee stage. Rhode Island House Bill 7470, which "recognizes the Seaconke Wampanoag tribe as a Native American tribe", was introduced on February 11, 2022. Since March 1, 2022, the bill has been "held for further study" by committee. On January 24, 2024, Rhode Island Senate Bill 2238 was introduced to recognize "the Seaconke Wampanoag tribe as a Native American Indian tribe for the limited purpose of assisting this tribe in establishing eligibility for federal benefits and privileges".

On February 2, 2024, Rhode Island House Bill 7477 was introduced with the same stated purpose. The only legislative opposition to the bill was from Rhode Island Governor Dan McKee. His executive counsel, Claire Richards, said that recognition of tribes was for the federal government, adding: "Rhode Island state government does not currently have the resources to make accurate determinations about tribal existence." In 2024, The Narragansett Indian Tribe also opposed recognition.

== Genetic analysis ==
In 2005, Zhadanov et al., from the Genographic Project, analyzed genetic variation among members of the Seaconke Wampanoag Tribe in Massachusetts and Rhode Island. Scholars have used the findings to illustrate the difficulty of determining Native American ancestry based on genetic data alone.

Among those members of the group who were tested, Zhadanov et al. found a "complex mixture of maternal and paternal lineages of Native American, Melanesian, African, and European derivation". The researchers concluded that "the genetic data clearly support the extensive genealogical information and tribal records gathered by the Seaconke Wampanoag Tribe", including a significant history of admixture with people of African and European descent. Zhadanov et al. said the finding of a "high frequency of nonnative haplotypes in this population" was a pattern that "has also been observed in other Native American tribes of North America". They also said that some Indigenous heritage "would not appear through the analysis of mtDNA and Y-chromosome variation because direct maternal and paternal links to indigenous ancestors had been lost due to population loss or admixture".

Among the samples studied, most of the mtDNA haplotypes belonged to West Eurasian and African lineages, while paternal Y-chromosome analysis identified "a range of Native American, West Eurasian, and African haplogroups" but also paternal lineage that "appears at its highest frequencies in New Guinea and Melanesia". This heritage was traced to an Australian migrant who was himself likely descended from Indonesian and Melanesian laborers brought to Australasia as a result of colonialism, and the Native American haplogroup found was traced to a paternal ancestor with male descendants in a Cherokee community to the south. The authors concluded:

Together, these sources of information have allowed us to trace the familial connections of the Seaconke Wampanoag community back to the early 18th century. Our data also reflect the profound impact of historical factors on the cultural, linguistic, and genetic make-up of Indian communities in New England. They further highlight the complexity of indigenous identity of tribes from this region, and underscore the importance of honoring the distinct peoples and cultures that historically inhabited North America.

In his book DNA USA: A Genetic Portrait of America (2012), human geneticist Bryan Sykes (1947–2020) said that while "the complete absence of Native American mDNA among the Seaconke Wampanoag came as a great surprise" to him, the evidence undermined "the genetic definition of race" and showed "how incompetent DNA really is at assigning individuals to discrete categories". Writing of this research, Jenny Reardon and Kim TallBear said that, although the Seaconke Wampanoag sampled "largely trace to European and African populations", the research was nevertheless "notable for its insightful treatment of nongenetic Wampanoag history and the fact that it was coauthored by Genographic Project scientists and Wampanoag tribal members". TallBear has also noted that federal recognition often places an emphasis on genetic heritage, and said, "Let us hope that regulators and policymakers in our genetically rather fetishistic country do not hold Genographic's findings against the Seaconke Wampanoag people."

== Activities ==
The Seaconke Wampanoag community was involved in the building of the First Free Methodist Church in Seekonk, Massachusetts, in 1925. The group has hosted an annual powwow in Rehoboth, Massachusetts since 1996.

== Notable individuals ==
Before he led the Seaconke Wampanoag Tribe, Wilfred "Eagle Heart" Greene (1937–2016), known professionally as "Wild Willie", was a boxer, ranking seventh among middleweight champions internationally. He organized the Seaconke Wampanoag as a nonprofit in 1997 and held the first of its annual powwows. According to Greene, he was a descendant of Ousamequin (Wampanoag, c. 1581–1661), more commonly known as Massasoit.

Professional boxer Kali Reis (also known as "K.O. Mequinonoag") is a member of the Seaconke Wampanoag. The name she boxes under, Mequinonoag, was given to her by her mother.

Moniquill Blackgoose, a science fiction/fantasy author, is also a member of the Seaconke Wampanoag Tribe.

== See also ==
- List of organizations that self-identify as Native American tribes
