= Southern Cherokee Nation of Kentucky =

Unrecognized tribe

The Southern Cherokee Nation of Kentucky (SCNK) is an unrecognized tribe based in Kentucky, United States. The SCNK said it had an estimated one thousand members as of 2009, living in several US states, and that it is "not affiliated with any other group calling themselves Southern Cherokee" or any officially recognized Cherokee nations.

== State recognition status ==
While the State of Kentucky has a Native American Heritage Commission, Kentucky has no state-recognized tribes and "the state doesn't have a process for them to apply for formal recognition." In 2011, a bill to establish a process for state recognition of Indian tribes passed the Kentucky House of Representatives, but did not make it to the Kentucky Senate floor for a vote, and thus failed to pass.

Amy Den Ouden and Jean O'Brien wrote in 2013 that "Kentucky's recognition of the Southern Cherokee nation proved even more tenuous: while Governor John Young Brown sent a letter to the Southern Cherokee nation in 1893 welcoming the tribe to the Commonwealth's state fair and noting that the Commonwealth 'regonize [sic] the Southern Cherokee Nation as a [sic] Indian tribe' (recognition that would be underscored by a 2006 proclamation by Governor Ernie Fletcher). Kentucky currently claims to have no state-recognized tribes and disputes that any kind of government-to-government relationship was established. Thus, even those recognitions that did occur during this period were more ambiguous and uncertain than many that took place during earlier and later periods."

== See also ==
- Cherokee heritage groups, associations of people who identify with Cherokee culture but do not qualify for enrollment in any of the three federally recognized Cherokee tribes
- Cherokee in the American Civil War
- Ridgetop Shawnee, another non-recognized Indian tribe in Kentucky
- Scuffletown, Kentucky, a ghost town along the Ohio River at the northern border of western Kentucky that had Cherokee inhabitants
