= Vinyard Indian Settlement =

Organization in Illinois

- Named after: Vinyard family, American Indians
- Formation: 2002 (nonprofit)
- Type: nonprofit organization, unrecognized cultural heritage group
- Tax ID no.: EIN 37-1387373
- Purpose: Cultural, Ethnic Awareness (A23)
- Location: Herod, Illinois, United States
- Official language: English
- Principal officer: Christine Wagner

Vinyard Indian Settlement is an unrecognized group and nonprofit organization of people who claim to have Shawnee ancestry. Based in Herod, Illinois, the group engages in cultural preservation activities and community outreach, though it is not recognized as a tribe by federal or state governments.

== Origin ==
The poet Barney Bush (1944–2021), who claimed to be of Shawnee and Cayuga ancestry, was a major organizer for this group. He purchased a trailer that served as the group's headquarters and organized a council. Bush said that about 1,810 Shawnee refugees fled a militia in Ohio and hid out near Karbers Ridge, Illinois, where the German/Irish-American Vinyard family allowed them to settle on their land. Bush said they assimilated into the local communities. Other locals did not corroborate this story, and genealogists had "open objections to any connection with the Shawnee."

== Nonprofit organization ==
In 2002, the group formed a 501(c)(3) nonprofit organization based in Herod, Illinois. Christine Wagner is their principal officer. In 2011, their revenue was $12,637 and their expenses were $22,254.

In 2019, Mark Denzer served as executive director of the organization.

== Land ==
The group owns a 24-acre parcel of land outside of Herod, Illinois, and hope to purchase more surrounding land.

== Status ==
The Vinyard Indian Settlement is not federally recognized or state-recognized as a Native American tribe. Illinois has no state-recognized tribes.

In 2015, the Illinois state house of representatives passed HB 3127, Vinyard Indian Settlement of Shawnee Indians Recognition Act, which would have established them as the first state-recognized tribe in Illinois. However, upon hearing testimony from Shawnee tribes, the state senate did not vote on the bill. Leaders from the Absentee-Shawnee Tribe of Indians of Oklahoma, Eastern Shawnee Tribe of Oklahoma, and Shawnee Tribe all traveled to Illinois to testify against the recognition of the Vinyard Indian Settlement.

== Activities ==
The organization hosts Reconnection Days, an annual gathering in September, begun in 2010. They hold two other annual public festivals.

Ben Barnes, chief of the federally recognized Shawnee Tribe, based in Miami, Oklahoma, stated of Barney Bush and the Vinyard Indian Settlement: "These [ceremonial] activities he presents for people are minstrel shows. When they do those pantomimes, that is offensive and racist."
