= Matinecock Tribal Nation =

Cultural organization in Long Island, New York

- Matinecock Tribal Nation of Queens and Long Island New York Inc.
- Named after: Matinecock
- Type: 501(c)(3) Public Charity
- Tax ID no.: EIN: 82-3125528
- Headquarters: Kew Gardens, Queens
- Location: United States
- Official language: English
- Website: matinecocktribalnation.org

The Matinecock Tribal Nation is a nonprofit organization that self-identifies as a Native American tribe but is not recognized as a tribe by the federal government or by any state government.

== About ==
Several institutions in Queens have issued land acknowledgements that state that they consider the Matinecock Tribal Nation to be the Indigenous people of the land, including the Heckscher Museum of Art and the Queens Botanical Garden.

== Status ==
There is one federally recognized tribe on Long Island, the Shinnecock Indian Nation, as well as one state-recognized tribe, the Unkechaug Nation. The Matinecock Tribal Nation does not have recognition from either the state of New York or the federal government.

== History ==
Members of the Matinecock Tribal Nation and the state-recognized Unkechaug Nation attended the groundbreaking of the new Douglaston-Little Neck Library in 2026.

== See also ==
- List of organizations that self-identify as Native American tribes
- Native American recognition in the United States
