= Pedro Guanikeyu Torres =

Taino activist

Chief Pedro Guanikeyu Torres
- Ciba Guanikeyu
- Born: 1951 (age 73–74)
- Other names: Noble Bird of the White Earth
- Citizenship: American
- Organization: Jatibonicu Taino Tribal Nation of Boriken
- Movement: El Movimiento Indio Taíno de Boriken (Puerto Rico)

Pedro Guanikeyu Torres, also known as Peter Guanikeyu Torres, is a Taíno civil rights activist, non-profit organization leader, educator, language teacher, historian, actor and Taíno nationalist of Puerto Rico. He is one of the founders of the 1968 Taíno Indian Movement of Puerto Rico, and campaigns for the officially recognition of the Jatibonicu Taíno Tribal Nation of Borikén.

== Education ==
Torres's academic background includes studies in Cultural Anthropology, Puerto Rican studies, Art and Latin American studies. Torres graduated from Rutgers University, the State University of New Jersey at Livingston College in June 1977.

== Cultural activism ==
In the late 1960s and early 1970s Torres did research aimed at documenting Taíno artifacts and history through the CPI Comite Pro Indigenismo. In the mid-1970s Torres had translated the very first theater script from the Spanish language to the Taíno language as a former actor and member of El Grupo Guazabara (the Guazabara Theater Group). In 1993 he founded the Taino Inter-Tribal Council (TITC, Inc.), a non-profit cultural and educational organization. He worked at various archaeological sites, including Puerto De Tierra in the 1970s. For over five decades and many years, Torres has advocated the reclaiming and repatriation of artifacts pertaining to the past pre-Columbian historical territory of the principal regional Chief Orocobix of the Jatibonicu Taino tribe, a tribe once located in the central mountain region of Puerto Rico.

Torres is recognized as a Taíno revivalist, civil rights activist, and one of the original founding fathers of the 1968 Taíno Indian Movement of Puerto Rico. He campaigns for the official government recognition of Taíno descendants and his unrecognized Jatibonicu Taíno community of Puerto Rico and in New Jersey. As the organization's leader, Torres is politically active in the group's governance as well as national and international political affairs.

Often known as Don Pedro or Chief Guanikeyu, in 1996 Torres called for the "Taino national unity of all the Taino Indian people". In 2000, Torres represented the Jatibonicu Taino Tribal Nation before the U.S. Census Bureau. He has written various papers and articles on the relevancy of Taíno culture and the history of Taínos in Puerto Rico, Florida and adjacent areas.

Torres also worked as a Taíno language teacher and researcher. As the organization's leader, he conducted the traditional Taíno Guatiao (naming ceremony) and has bestowed a Taíno name on many Taíno-identifying people today. He also promoted the Taíno language when he was chosen to name a crater on planet Venus that he named Nanichi, meaning "My Love or My Heart", in the year 2000.

== Resignation and subsequent return ==
Due to failing health, Guanikeyu Torres retired from direct leadership of the Jatibonicu Taino Tribal Nation in 2001, and assumed the post of "tribal elder" instead.
