= Hiram F. "Pete" Gregory Jr. =

American anthropologist

Dr. Hiram F. “Pete” Gregory Jr. is an archeologist and professor of four-field anthropology at Northwestern State University in Natchitoches, Louisiana.

== Biography ==
Gregory was born in Vidalia, Louisiana in 1937, but shortly after his birth, moved to Ferriday, Louisiana, where he spent the majority of his youth. He identifies as having Scots-Irish, German, and Native American ancestry, and he cites this as an influence on his anthropological work.

== Career ==
In 1961, after graduating from Louisiana State University, Gregory began his career as a temporary instructor at NSU, eventually accepting permanent professorship in the departments of anthropology and geography, where he remains as the university’s longest-serving employee. Having conducted excavations at the archaeological site of Los Adaes from the 1960s through the 1980s, Gregory is credited with advancing scholarship on Louisiana’s colonial history. He is also recognized for his scholarship on Native American tribes of Louisiana, produced through close ethnographic work, including land and language preservation projects, with citizens of tribes such as the Caddo Nation, the Tunica–Biloxi Tribe, and the Jena Band of Choctaws. In addition to his fieldwork and professorship, Gregory is a curator for NSU's Williamson Museum, as well as an academic advisor for the Louisiana Creole Heritage Center, the Louisiana Folklife Center, and the Natchitoches-NSU Folk Festival, of which he is the co-founder.

== Publications ==
- Africa in the Delta in libraries (WorldCat catalog)
- Eighteenth Century Caddoan Archaeology: A Study in Models and Interpretation in libraries (WorldCat catalog)
- Natchitoches Parish Cultural and Historical Resources History in libraries (WorldCat catalog)
- Excavations 1979, Presidio de Nuestra Snra. del Pilar de Los Adaes in libraries (WorldCat catalog)
- Historical and Archaeological Background of Los Adaes State Commemorative Area, Natchitoches Parish, Louisiana, 1980-1981 in libraries (WorldCat catalog)
- Excavations 1981-82, Presidio de Nuestra Snra del Pilar de Los Adaes in libraries (WorldCat catalog)
- Excavations: Presidio de Nuestra Senora [sic del Pilar de Los Adaes] in libraries (WorldCat catalog)
- Excavations, Unit 227, Presidio Nuestra Senora del Pilar de Los Adaes: (16 NA 16) in libraries (WorldCat catalog)
- The Apache-Choctaw of Ebarb: An Assessment of the Status of a Louisiana Indian Tribe in libraries (WorldCat catalog)
- The Caddo Indians of Louisiana in libraries (WorldCat catalog)
- The Southern Caddo: An Anthology in libraries (WorldCat catalog) ISBN 9780824058869
- The Historic Indian Tribes of Louisiana: From 1542 to the Present in libraries (WorldCat catalog) ISBN 9780807112953
- A Survey of Catahoula Basin in libraries (WorldCat catalog)
- Survey of the Tunica-Biloxi Reservation in libraries (WorldCat catalog)
- An Archaeological Survey of the Lower Dugdemona River, Winn Parish, Louisiana, 1989 in libraries (WorldCat catalog)
- Dr. Webb in libraries (WorldCat catalog)
- Proceedings of the Southeastern Indian Basketry Gathering, May 16-17, 2002 in libraries (WorldCat catalog)
- The Work of Tribal Hands: Southeastern Indian Split Cane Basketry in libraries (WorldCat catalog) ISBN 9780917898273
- Culture Change & Continuity in the Delta Region: A Scholarly Conversation Between Researchers and Members of the Folk Communities in the Mississippi Delta River Region in libraries (WorldCat catalog)

== Awards ==
- In 1999, Gregory was the recipient of the President's Distinguished Service Award
- In 2016, Gregory was named Louisiana's Archaeologist of the Year by Lieutenant Governor Billy Nungesser and the Louisiana Office of Cultural Development
- In 2018, Gregory was the recipient of a Lifetime Achievement Award from the Louisiana Creole Heritage Center
- In 2019, Gregory was the recipient of Louisiana's Lifetime Contribution to the Humanities Award from Lieutenant Governor Billy Nungesser and the Louisiana Endowment for the Humanities
