= Scuffletown, Bullitt County, Kentucky =

Unincorporated community in Kentucky, United States

Scuffletown
- Unincorporated community
- Location within the state of Kentucky Scuffletown (the United States)
- Coordinates: 37°52′21″N 85°38′55″W
- Country: United States
- State: Kentucky
- County: Bullitt
- Elevation: 577 ft (176 m)
- Time zone: UTC-5 (Eastern (EST))
  - Summer (DST): UTC-4 (EST)
- GNIS feature ID: 509023

Scuffletown is an unincorporated community located in Bullitt County, Kentucky, United States.
