= Scuffletown, Henderson County, Kentucky =

Scuffletown
- Ghost town
- Location within the state of Kentucky
- Coordinates: 37°55′22″N 87°22′20″W
- Country: United States
- State: Kentucky
- County: Henderson
- Elevation: 374 ft (114 m)
- Time zone: UTC-6 (Central (CST))
  - Summer (DST): UTC-5 (CST)
- GNIS feature ID: 509024

Scuffletown is a ghost town in Henderson County on the northern border of the western part of the U.S. state of Kentucky. Located on the Ohio River just above the mouth of Green River, it was a city for barely 100 years, but is well known in the area because of the activities there during the American Civil War and its rough reputation.

== Geography ==
Scuffletown Bottoms, as it is called now, is on the Kentucky–Indiana border almost directly across the Ohio River from Newburgh, Indiana. It is situated in the northeastern portion of Henderson County, Kentucky.

== History ==
Scuffletown got its start in 1800 when Jonathan Thomas Scott, aka Scott Fox, supposedly the third son of the Shawnee leader Cornstalk, married Mary Polly Cooper, a Cherokee. They had two sons Jonathan Scott and Thomas Scott. Around the time of the Cherokee removal, their father was shot to death in Shawneetown, Illinois in 1838. He ran a tavern in the area that passing river traffic could easily access. His great-great-grandson, Michael "Manfox" Buley still lives in Henderson County.

Scuffletown got its name from the flatboat people coming down the Ohio River. The Cherokee played stickball and had wrestling matches right outside the tavern/trading post. The white people saw this as scuffling. According to the Annals and Scandals of Henderson County by Maralea Arnett, since he kept a good supply of liquor, it became a rendezvous for flatboatmen and others on the river. Often a general fight developed after several hours of drinking and the place received the name of Scuffletown.

A school was built there sometime around 1817. The first church was built in 1830 at the Vanada farm. A tobacco stemmery was built in 1860 and shipped 400 to 450 hogsheads per year to Europe. A steam gristmill and blacksmith shop soon followed. In addition to crops of tobacco and corn, Scuffletown was noted for its large number of pecan trees.

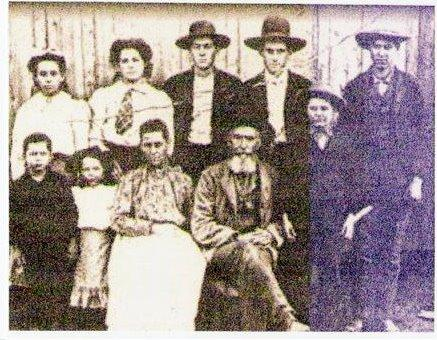
Some Cherokee of Scuffletown & Henderson, Kentucky c. 1890–1910

The site witnessed numerous Civil War-era activities. The Silver Lake No. 2, a sternwheel packet (steamboat) weighing some 129 tons and outfitted with six cannons capable of firing 24 pound shot, stopped at Scuffletown during its patrols of the Ohio. In 1863, eight Union companies of infantry and one company of artillery were stationed at Scuffletown to protect the area of Confederate raiders. Scuffletown is mentioned in the Civil War account "Operations of the Mississippi Squadron during Morgan's Raid".

Sometime in the late 1800s, James Martin led a group of Cherokee refugees to the area from Fort Smith, Arkansas to join kinsman living in the Scuffletown area. On December 26, 1893, the group was officially welcomed as an Indian tribe by Governor John Y. Brown. Through the years since, the descendants of these Cherokee have maintained ties to the culture and traditions of their people. At least twice each year, Tribal Members meet in various locations around the area to perform their sacred ceremonies.

According to an atlas originally printed and copy written in 1895 by the Rand McNally Corporation, downtown Scuffletown had a population of 71. By 1868, Scuffletown had grown enough to get a post office. However, a 1913 flood greatly devastated the city, causing a mass exodus that it never recovered from. Its post office closed permanently in January 1914. Then an even larger flood in 1937 decimated what little remained, and it has sat mostly deserted ever since. The area is now simply referred to Scuffletown Bottoms, though it often goes unnamed.

On January 18, 2001, the U.S. Fish and Wildlife Service proposed the establishment of a national wildlife refuge in the Scuffletown Bottoms. The purpose of the proposed refuge is to protect, restore and manage a valuable complex of wetland habitats for the benefit of migrating and wintering waterfowl, non-game land birds, and other native fish and wildlife.

The Kentucky Oral History Sound Recordings project, produced in conjunction with the Kentucky Historical Society and the Downtown Henderson Project, has recorded conversations with former residents of Scuffletown. These recordings are housed at the Henderson County Public Library.

== See also ==
- Southern Cherokee Nation of Kentucky, a non-recognized group claiming Cherokee heritage from the Scuffletown area
