= United Confederation of Taíno People =

Cultural organization in New York and Puerto Rico

The United Confederation of Taíno People (UCTP) is an organization based in New York City and Puerto Rico, dedicated to the self-determination of people of Taíno and other Caribbean Indigenous descent, as well as the preservation and revival of Taíno culture, language and religion. The Confederation characterizes itself as "a forum for educational advocacy (including human rights and cultural education) and policy development to affirm and safeguard indigenous Taíno and other Caribbean cultural heritage and spiritual traditions (including burial issues); and promote spiritual, cultural, educational, health, economic, and social development in the Caribbean and the Diaspora." It is an associate member of the International Indian Treaty Council.

== About ==
Founded in 1998, the UCTP has noted in statements that it is not a tribe, but an "Indigenous representative institution made up of various Taíno entities." It has also created a separate non-profit by its namesake titled "United Confederation of the Taíno People, Inc." to assist in its affairs, that is registered in New York state as a 501(c)(3) non-profit organization.

=== Declaration of the United Confederation of Taíno People ===
The UCTP's founding declaration was established on January 3rd of 1998, and lists eight articles for their organization:

1) The protection, defense, and preservation of Taíno cultural heritage and spiritual traditions by enlisting and uniting societies, groups, and organizations together in the Circum-Caribbean, such as the Greater Antilles, Lesser Antilles, Bahamas, Bimini, the Northern Coastal region of South America, and the Yucatan Peninsula.

2) The encouragement of friendships, alliances, communications, and "good relationships" between Taíno yucayeque (communities), organizations, groups, and socieities, especially those separated by borders.

3) The promotion of spiritual, cultural, educational, economic, and social activities for the development of contemporary Taíno communities and generations in the future.

4) The support of a centralized registration system recognized by each region that would strengthen understandings "between all regional territories or jurisdictions and their leadership."

5) A forum for consultation on issues relevant to Taíno communities that "require concerted action".

6) A respect for the autonomy of every organization, society, or group in membership with it, and a system of accountability based on consensus for anyone who creates "disharmony amongst Taíno People, abuse their leadership positions, engage in false statements and/or creating the confusion that they represent the sole leadership of the Taíno People or this Confederation".

7) A statement announcing the submission of their Declaration to the United Nations Charter for public registration.

8) Finally, the promotion of respect for all the provisions mentioned in the Declaration on local, national, and international levels.

=== Taíno descent and self-determination ===
According to the Natural Resources Conservation Service (NRCS), an agency of the United States Department of Agriculture, the UCTP is one of "several groups claiming Taino descent" that has "gained visibility in the late 20th century". NRCS notes that while no Taíno group has recognition as a tribe, the organization "consider themselves Taino" and "claim the right to self-determination".

In 2020, a representative of the United Confederation of Taíno People, Tai Pelli, joined the International Indian Treaty Council board of directors as board secretary and treasurer, becoming the first Indigenous Caribbean representative on the IITC board and executive committee. The UCTP and IITC has pushed the United States to have greater dialogue with unrecognized tribes, including the Taíno, based on Article 1 (self-determination) of the International Covenant on Civil and Political Rights.

== Advocacy ==
The UCTP is involved in affairs related to Indigenous Caribbean issues on varying levels of society, and has made statements on them several times.

=== Indigenous People's Day ===
The organization expressed opposition to Columbus Day, due to Columbus's persecution of Taínos and other Indigenous people of the Caribbean, and called for the holiday to be renamed Indigenous Peoples' Day. The UCTP president R. Múkaro Agüeibaná Borrero noted that for Indigenous people, "the bottom line is Columbus Day is just a celebration of genocide.” He elaborated, saying that the push to rename the holiday was not an attempt to discriminate against Italian Americans or, as some argued, erase their history: "We’re all for Italian-Americans celebrating their heritage."

=== Birth of the New World statue ===
The UCTP reiterated their sentiment against symbols representing figures in colonialist history in criticisms of a statue devoted to Columbus that was brought to Arecibo. The UCTP president said the more than 350-foot statue was a "tribute to genocide, colonialism, religious intolerance, racism, gender violence, and white supremacy."

=== UN Permanent Forum on Indigenous Issues ===
In 2022, Borrero addressed the UN Permanent Forum on Indigenous Issues (UNPFII) to raise issues important to Indigenous Caribbeans, including the lack of official recognition for Taíno peoples generally. The UCTP delegates said that Indigenous Caribbean languages should be included in the International Decade of Indigenous Languages. UCTP representative Tai Pelli also raised environmental issues of interest to local Taíno groups, both from pollution and from property development on sites of cultural significance in Puerto Rico. In support of these statements, Yaqui Nation member Andrea Carmen, executive director of the International Indian Treaty Council, explained that while most Indigenous groups lack recognition worldwide, Puerto Rico's status as a colony adds additional complications preventing the recognition of local Taíno groups.

=== Taíno historical site preservation ===
The UCTP issued a press release in April of 2022, criticizing the Puerto Rican Senate bill RCS 45, which would have placed the Caguana Ceremonial Ball Courts Site under the control of the municipal government of Utuado instead of the Institute of Puerto Rican Culture. The UCTP felt the bill, first presented by Senator González Huertas, opened the historical site and its Batéys to the risk of privatization and would allow the government "to issue titles to third parties".

The UCTP cited Article 11 and 12 of the American Declaration On the Rights of Indigenous People by the OAS, noting that Taínos not being state or federally recognized didn't prevent them from having rights that included the "right to self-determination and identification and our right to Free Prior, Informed Consent". Their statement reflected local backlash, such as Senator Mariana Nogales Molinelli's criticism of the measure and the effect it would have on Taíno historical sites in Puerto Rico: "This RCS 45 would permit the privatization and transfer of ownership of a sacred place."

=== United Nations Water Conference ===
In 2023, the UCTP was among the signatories of the Indigenous Peoples' Declaration for the United Nations Water Conference. The declaration makes "recommendations for the actions required by the international community to protect, defend and safeguard water", with particular consideration for how water insecurity affects Indigenous peoples.

== See also ==
- Taíno
- Indigenous Rights
