= Commission of Indian Affairs =

The terms Commission of Indian Affairs, Commission of Indian Affairs, Commission on American Indian Affairs, or Commission on Native American Affairs refer to a U.S. state-level agencies, operating in several states to defend the interest of indigenous peoples, tribes and cultures. The Bureau of Indian Affairs handles these issues at federal-level.

== Agencies ==
- Alabama - Alabama Indian Affairs Commission
- Arizona - Arizona Commission on Indian Affairs
- California - California Native American Heritage Commission
- Colorado - Colorado Commission of Indian Affairs
- Delaware - Delaware Commission on Indigenous Affairs
- Georgia - Georgia Council on American Indian Concerns
- Florida - Florida Governor's Council on Indian Affairs, Inc.
- Maryland - Maryland Commission on Indian Affairs
- Minnesota - Minnesota Indian Affairs Council
- Nebraska - Nebraska Commission on Indian Affairs
- Nevada - Nevada Indian Commission
- New Hampshire - New Hampshire State Commission on Native American Affairs
- New Jersey - New Jersey Commission on American Indian Affairs
- New Mexico - New Mexico Indian Affairs Department
- North Carolina - North Carolina Commission of Indian Affairs
- Tennessee - Tennessee Commission of Indian Affairs
- Washington - Governor's Office of Indian Affairs
- Wisconsin - Wisconsin State-Tribal Relations Initiative
