= Eastern Cherokee, Southern Iroquois, and United Tribes of South Carolina =

Heritage society in South Carolina, United States:

Eastern Cherokee, Southern Iroquois and United Tribes of South Carolina
- Eastern Cherokee, Southern Iroquois & United Tribes of South Carolina, A Heritage Society: The Cherokee Indian Tribe of South Carolina, Inc.
- Official logo of the Eastern Cherokee, Southern Iroquois and United Tribes of South Carolina, Inc. (ECSIUT)
- Abbreviation: ECSIUT
- Formation: June 27, 1997; 29 years ago
- Founder: William M. Goins
- Founded at: Columbia, SC
- Type: 501(c)(3) organization, Cherokee heritage group
- Tax ID no.: EIN 58-2328510
- Legal status: State-recognized tribe, nonprofit organization
- Purpose: A23: Cultural, Ethnic Awareness
- Headquarters: Duncan, SC
- Members: 400
- Official language: English
- Chief: Lamar Nelson
- Vice-Chief: Jody Noe
- Website: cherokeeofsc.com

The Eastern Cherokee, Southern Iroquois & United Tribes of South Carolina, A Heritage Society: The Cherokee Indian Tribe of South Carolina, Inc. often shortened to the Eastern Cherokee, Southern Iroquois, and United Tribes of South Carolina or abbreviated as ECSIUT is a Cherokee heritage society, 501(c)(3) nonprofit organization and a state-recognized tribe in South Carolina. The ECSIUT is not federally recognized by the United States Government, or eligible for services provided through the Bureau of Indian Affairs.

The Eastern Band of Cherokee Indians and Cherokee Nation are collectively opposed to the ECSIUT, with the Cherokee Nation notably including the organization in a list of 212 "fraudulent groups" that claim Cherokee identity. These federally recognized tribes uniformly uphold a strict stance against federally unrecognized Cherokee heritage groups asserting Cherokee tribal identity. In 2008, the Cherokee Nation and the Eastern Band of Cherokee Indians adopted a joint resolution condemning fabricated 'Cherokee tribes' and opposing the recognition of any new tribes or bands claiming Cherokee identity at either the state or federal level.

== Headquarters and purpose ==
The ECSIUT was first headquartered in Columbia, South Carolina and founded by William Moreau Goins, who established the group as the "Eastern Cherokee, Southern Iroquois, & United Tribes, A Heritage Society" on June 27, 1997. The society formed after the Midlands Intertribal Empowerment Group (MIEG) was established on July 14, 1995, and began holding annual powwows at the South Carolina State Fairgrounds each May. Some members of the MIEG subsequently joined the ECSIUT. The name of the society was amended to include The Cherokee Indian Tribe of South Carolina, Inc. on November 23, 1999.

The ECSIUT was established with the mission to "preserve, present, protect, and document Cherokee history and other Native American Indian tribes' cultures and individuals, material culture, historic buildings, and folkways in South Carolina". Like its predecessor, the society was intended "to provide an intertribal forum for the Native American people throughout the State of South Carolina to caucus, to discuss educational, health, spiritual, and economic development needs for their respective communities and...to foster a spirit of unified voice among Native American communities."

Goins served as CEO until his death on November 11, 2017. The ECSIUT has since relocated and is presently headquartered in Duncan, South Carolina.

In April 2020, two and a half years after Goins' death, the ECSIUT elected archaeologist Lamar Nelson as their new chief, tribal CEO, and archaeologist. Nelson previously served on the organization's board. He states that he is of Cherokee descent, describing himself as a "mixed-blood Native American" on the basis of family tradition, stating that his paternal grandmother was half Cherokee, and his paternal grandfather was half Choctaw. Based on these statements, Nelson maintains he is one-eighth Cherokee and one-eighth Choctaw. Nelson maintains that he has practiced his culture throughout his life, having learned about native plants and Cherokee traditions from his grandmother. He states that his great-grandmother was a Cherokee medicine woman and that his ancestors are buried beneath Lake Keowee.

In his capacity as CEO of the ECSIUT, Nelson has led community programs on Native American history, displaying artifacts, offering to identify items that attendees bring, and appearing in regalia.

== Recognition and membership ==
=== State-recognized group recognition ===
The ECSIUT was first recognized as a state-recognized group under South Carolina Code Section 1-31-40(A)(7)(10), with authority in Chapter 139 (100–111), on February 17, 2005. Under state law, "groups" are defined as organizations of individuals with diverse backgrounds and do not require a unified ethnic or cultural heritage, unlike tribes, which are composed of interrelated families or clans with at least a century of documented continuity. The ECSIUT was originally founded as a Cherokee heritage group in 1997, including Native Americans and individuals from other ethnic backgrounds, without requiring ancestral or blood relation among members.

Gene Crediford, who photographed and interviewed various groups in South Carolina from the 1980s through the 2000s, has noted that Columbia, South Carolina, where the ECSIUT was founded, lacked central communal organization in modern history and had been historically associated with Cofitachequi rather than the Cherokee people. Crediford has noted that some individuals with ambiguous ancestry often identify as "Cherokee," regarding the term to be synonymous with "Indian."

Nelson, as leader of the ECSIUT, has stated that members are multi-tribal, with close social, ancestral, cultural, and economic ties to tribal communities in South Carolina, as well as Native groups and tribes in other states. He explained, "Some of our members have affiliations, family connections, and enrollment with other tribes yet we honor their rights, and honor their citizenship."

=== Repeal of state-recognized groups ===
In 2018, the Governor of South Carolina, Henry McMaster, signed legislation repealing the state’s ability to state-recognize groups. Concerns were raised about group recognition, as it did not require members to prove or document Indigenous ancestry, although such organizations could apply for certain federal grants, register businesses as minority-owned, and participate in state discussions on Native American affairs. State officials and researchers had raised concerns that some organizations and individuals asserting Indigenous identity lacked verifiable historical or ancestral documentation.

As an already state-recognized group, the ECSIUT was grandfathered in along with other state-recognized groups under existing policy to maintain its recognized status after the state eliminated its legal framework for future group recognition.

=== State recognition ===
In 2025, following the transition of the South Carolina Commission for Minority Affairs to the State Commission for Community Advancement and Engagement (SCCAE), the agency formally redesignated the ECSIUT as a state-recognized tribe.

== Opposition from Cherokee ==
Logo of the ECSIUT.

Seal of the Principal Chief of the EBCI.

Comparison of the ECSIUT logo to the official seal of the Principal Chief of the Eastern Band of Cherokee Indians.

Despite obtaining state-recognition the ECSIUT is not a federally recognized tribe, or eligible for services provided through the Bureau of Indian Affairs. The federally recognized Cherokee tribes, the Eastern Band of Cherokee Indians and the Cherokee Nation are opposed to the recognition of any new tribes or bands claiming Cherokee identity at either the state or federal level, and regard the ECSIUT as among hundreds of fraudulent organizations.

David Cornsilk, a citizen of the Cherokee Nation, as well as a genealogist and historian, has highlighted concerns about such organizations, stating that they can dilute the legal and cultural definition of tribal sovereignty. He explained that such groups often form from preexisting state-recognized organizations, which may be grandfathered in without requiring sufficient proof of Indigenous ancestry or tribal status. The ECSIUT, grandfathered in as a state-recognized group and later redesignated as a state-recognized tribe in South Carolina, aligns with Cornsilk’s description of organizations he and other Cherokees have expressed concerns about, including potential exploitation of the Indian Arts and Crafts Act of 1990 intended to protect authentic Cherokee-made items.

== Activities ==
For 20 years, the ECSIUT hosted an annual Native American film festival in Columbia, South Carolina.

The ESCIUT hosts an annual powwow at Hagood Mill Historic Site in Pickens County, South Carolina.

== See also ==
- Cherokee descent
- Cherokee heritage groups
- Cherokee Tribe of Northeast Alabama
- Echota Cherokee Tribe of Alabama
- Georgia Tribe of Eastern Cherokee
