= North Carolina Commission of Indian Affairs =

State government agency in North Carolina, USA

The North Carolina Commission of Indian Affairs is an agency of the government of the U.S. state of North Carolina.

== History ==
At the request of Native American leaders in the state, in 1971 the North Carolina General Assembly authorized the creation of the Commission of Indian Affairs. The enabling legislation of the commission tasked it with four goals: to provide services to Indian communities, to promote social and economic development, to promote recognition of Indian culture, and to preserve Indian cultural integrity. North Carolina was the first state among several in the southeastern United States to create a public agency for handling Native American issues.

== Structure and membership ==
The commission is organized under the North Carolina Department of Administration. The commission is made up of 28 members. This comprises members appointed by the eight state-recognized tribes, four designated Indian urban associations, the Speaker of the North Carolina House of Representatives, the President of the North Carolina Senate, and seven ex officio members: the secretary of the North Carolina Department of Administration, the chairman of the N.C. Employment Security Commission, the secretary of the North Carolina Department of Environmental Quality, the secretary of the North Carolina Department of Health and Human Services, the North Carolina Commissioner of Labor, the chairperson of the N.C. Native American Youth Organization, and the chairperson of the N.C. Native American Council on Higher Education. The Indian communities represented on the commission are the Coharie of Sampson and Harnett Counties, the Eastern Band of the Cherokee, the Haliwa-Saponi of Halifax, Warren and adjoining counties, the Lumbee of Robeson, Hoke and Scotland Counties, the Meherrin of Hertford, Bertie, Northampton and Gates Counties, the Waccamaw Siouan Indians from Columbus and Bladen Counties, the Sappony of Person County, the Cumberland County Association for Indian People of Cumberland County, the Guilford Native Americans Association of Guilford and surrounding counties, the Metrolina Native American Association of Mecklenburg and surrounding counties, the Occaneechi Band of the Saponi Nation of Orange and surrounding counties, and the Triangle Native American Society of Wake and surrounding counties. The commission meets four times per year.

== Works cited ==
- Miller, Mark Edwin (2013). Claiming Tribal Identity: The Five Tribes and the Politics of Federal Acknowledgment. University of Oklahoma Press. ISBN 9780806150512.
- North Carolina Commission of Indian Affairs (April 1979). "A Historical Perspective about the Indians of North Carolina and an Overview of the Commission of Indian Affairs". The North Carolina Historical Review. 56 (2): 177–187. JSTOR 23534829.
