= Echota Cherokee Tribe of Alabama =

State-recognized tribe in Alabama

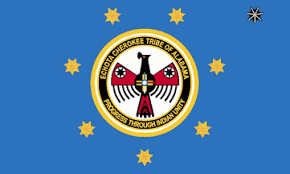
- flag
- Formation: 1980 (organized)
- Founded at: United States ( Alabama)
- Headquarters: Falkville, Alabama
- Members: 32,000+ (2024)
- Chief: Nancy Massey
- Website: echotacherokee.org

The Echota Cherokee Tribe of Alabama is a state-recognized tribe in Alabama and Cherokee heritage group. It is based in northern Alabama and gained state-recognition under the Davis-Strong Act in 1984. The tribe is headquartered in Falkville, Alabama, in Morgan County, and owns land in St. Clair and Cullman counties. It has participated in Indian education programs that bring Cherokee language, history, and culture into Alabama schools. The federally recognized Cherokee Nation and Eastern Band of Cherokee Indians oppose federal recognition of the tribe.

== History ==
After the passage of the Indian Removal Act in the 1830, the majority of the Cherokee people were forcibly removed from the Southeastern United States. The approximately 1,000 Cherokee people who remained in the Southeast formed the Eastern Band of Cherokee Indians and their tribe continues to live in the community known as the Qualla Boundary.

The tribe traces its origins to Cherokee people who avoided removal by remaining in or returning to Alabama, where many concealed their Native identity to escape detection. Historians have documented that the severe social and economic costs of acknowledging Native American identity after removal led many remaining Cherokee in Alabama to conceal their heritage. The 1884 Hester Roll listed only 71 Cherokee in Alabama, though the number remaining was likely higher than official records reflect. A 1910 court of claims application documented a population of hundreds of Cherokee living in Alabama.

In 1980, descendants of Cherokees who had escaped removal or returned to Alabama organized under the name Echota Cherokee — a reference to the traditional Cherokee capitals of New Echota and Chota — at a meeting in Opelika on March 16, 1980, where the group also drew up incorporation papers, bylaws, and a mission statement, and began a four-year campaign for state recognition. In 1984, the Alabama Legislature passed the Davis-Strong Act (Act No. 84-257), which created the Alabama Indian Affairs Commission and extended state recognition by name to seven tribes, bands, and groups, including the Echota Cherokee. Historian Mark Edwin Miller lists the Echota Cherokee among the original tribes represented at the commission's creation, alongside the Poarch Band of Creek Indians and the MOWA Band of Choctaw Indians. The group is headquartered in Falkville, Alabama.

In 1997, according to a study of the tribe's Cherokee language revitalization project conducted in partnership with Auburn University, the tribe numbered approximately 22,000 members; the study itself drew on a pretest questionnaire returned by 21 individuals chosen by clan chiefs, which the author noted was a small, self-selecting sample. Their stated accomplishments and goals at this time were that they had elected a council, and hoped to offer "instruction in the Cherokee language through the Alabama public school system." As of 2024, the Encyclopedia of Alabama reported that the tribe had more than 32,000 members across the state.

The Echota Cherokee have a representative on the Alabama Indian Affairs Commission and the Inter-Tribal Council of Alabama's WIA Program, to assist workforce improvement. On Indigenous Peoples' Day in 2022, Alabama Supreme Court Chief Justice Tom Parker sent a letter of apology to the tribe on behalf of past actions against their people during the times of removal. In 2026, a joint resolution introduced in the Alabama Legislature stated that the National Congress of American Indians had ended the eligibility of Alabama's state-recognized tribes for NCAI tribal membership, and urged the organization to restore it.

== Culture and community ==
The tribe is organized into seven clans — Wolf, Bird, Deer, Paint, Blue, Long Hair, and Wild Potato — reflecting the traditional Cherokee clan system. The Blue Clan comprises members in Lawrence, Winston, and Walker counties.

In the 2020 census, Lawrence County recorded the highest percentage of residents identifying as American Indian alone or in combination of any Alabama county, at 10.9 percent.

Tribal member Rickey Butch Walker helped develop the Lawrence County Schools Indian Education Program and the Oakville Indian Mounds Education Center, and has written numerous books on the region's Native history. Tribal citizen Olivia Parker was named Miss Indian Alabama in 2023.

== Nonprofit organization ==
The Echota Cherokee Tribe of Alabama has a 501(c)(3) nonprofit organization headquartered in Falkville, Alabama, and founded in 1995. Its missions is the "Education of general public with regard to Cherokee nation history, culture and background."According to its 2020 IRS filing, the nonprofit reported revenue of $35,925, expenses of $45,089, and no full-time staff.

== Recognition status ==
Recognition by an American state government is not the same as recognition on the federal level or recognition by continually existing Indian tribes. Both the federally recognized Cherokee Nation and Eastern Band of Cherokee Indians oppose federal recognition of the Echota Cherokee Tribe of Alabama, listing them among "fraudulent groups."

=== Heritage groups ===
Numerous organizations in the United States identify as having Cherokee heritage but lack documented ancestry or connection to the federally recognized Cherokee Nation, Eastern Band of Cherokee Indians, or United Keetoowah Band of Cherokee Indians in Oklahoma. Some of these groups have applied for federal recognition but been denied.

The Supreme Court made plain the exclusion of states from tribal matters in the earliest and most important cases that make up the foundation of Indian Law. In Worcester v. Georgia, 31 U.S. (6 Pet.) 515 (1832) the Court stated: 'The treaties and laws of the United States contemplate ... that all intercourse with [Indians] shall be carried on exclusively by the government of the union.' Real tribes are governments similar to States and Nations.

=== Petition for federal recognition ===
The Echota Cherokee Tribe of Alabama is not federally recognized as a Native American tribe, nor are they recognized by any of the federally recognized Cherokee communities.

The Echota Cherokee Tribe of Alabama sent a letter of intent to petition for federal recognition in 2009; however, the organization did not follow through with submitting a completed petition for federal recognition.

== Notable members ==
- Jeanne Rorex-Bridges, painter and illustrator

== See also ==
- Cherokee heritage groups
- Cherokee Tribe of Northeast Alabama
- Eastern Cherokee, Southern Iroquois, and United Tribes of South Carolina
- Georgia Tribe of Eastern Cherokee
- State-recognized tribes
