= MNAA =

MNAA is the acronym of the National Museum of Ancient Art in Lisbon, Portugal. It may also stand for:

- Metropolitan Nashville Airport Authority
- Metrolina Native American Association
- UDP-N-acetylglucosamine 2-epimerase, an enzyme
