= Georgia Council on American Indian Concerns =

State agency in Georgia, U.S.

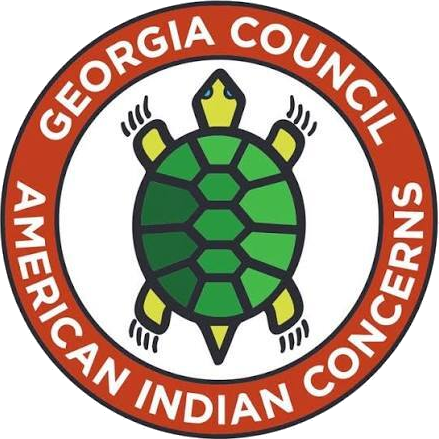

Council overview
- Formed: 1992
- Type: Advisory council
- Jurisdiction: Georgia
- Status: Active
- Headquarters: 2610 Georgia Highway 155 SW, Stockbridge, Georgia 30281
- Council executive: Nealie McCormick, Chair
- Parent Department: Georgia Department of Natural Resources
- Key document: Official Code of Georgia Annotated, §§ 44-12-280–285
- Website: georgiaindiancouncil.com

The Georgia Council on American Indian Concerns (GCAIC) is a state advisory council within the Georgia Department of Natural Resources that serves as Georgia’s official commission on American Indian affairs. Established by the Georgia General Assembly in 1992, the Council advises state and local governments on issues affecting American Indians, including the protection of Native American graves and burial objects, promoting cultural heritage preservation, and supporting economic development initiatives within American Indian communities in Georgia. It is the only state entity specifically authorized to address American Indian concerns in Georgia.

Georgia has no federally recognized tribes but three state-recognized tribes.

1. Cherokee of Georgia Tribal Council
2. Georgia Tribe of Eastern Cherokees
3. Lower Muskogee Creek Tribe

== History ==
The Georgia Council on American Indian Concerns was established by the Georgia General Assembly in 1992 through legislation creating the Georgia Native American Graves Protection and Repatriation Act. The legislation established the Council as the state’s official advisory body on American Indian affairs while assigning it to the Georgia Department of Natural Resources for administrative purposes. Its original mission focused on protecting Native American graves and burial objects from accidental or intentional disturbance while facilitating consultation with tribal governments and other interested parties.

Since its creation, the Council’s responsibilities have expanded beyond burial protection to include advising state and local governments on issues affecting American Indians, promoting public awareness of Georgia’s Indigenous history, encouraging heritage preservation, and supporting economic development initiatives within American Indian communities.

Administrative rules governing the Council’s responsibilities and procedures were adopted by the Georgia Department of Natural Resources in 2012, providing additional guidance for consultation, membership, and implementation of the Council’s statutory duties.

== Organization ==
The Council consists of nine members appointed by the Governor of Georgia. State law requires that the membership include five American Indian representatives, one professional archaeologist, one professional anthropologist, one scientist with expertise relevant to the Council’s responsibilities, and one member representing the public at large.

Although administratively attached to the Georgia Department of Natural Resources, the Council serves as Georgia’s official commission on American Indian affairs. It works with state agencies, local governments, tribal governments, museums, educational institutions, archaeologists, and cultural organizations on matters involving Indigenous cultural resources, consultation, education, and heritage preservation.

== Responsibilities ==
The Council’s statutory responsibilities include advising state and local governments on matters affecting American Indians in Georgia, administering provisions of the Georgia Native American Graves Protection and Repatriation Act, and assisting with consultation concerning the discovery and treatment of Native American human remains and burial objects.

The Council also promotes the preservation of American Indian history and culture, supports educational initiatives concerning Georgia’s Indigenous peoples, encourages economic development within American Indian communities, and provides recommendations regarding archaeological resources, museum collections, repatriation efforts, and cultural resource management.

== Relationship with tribal governments ==
The Council maintains government-to-government relationships with federally recognized tribal nations that possess historical and cultural connections to present-day Georgia.

In addition, Georgia law assigns the Council responsibilities relating to the state’s three state-recognized tribes, which were formally recognized by the Georgia General Assembly in 2007 under O.C.G.A. § 44-12-300.

As Georgia’s official commission on American Indian affairs, the Council serves as the primary liaison among tribal governments, state agencies, and other organizations on matters involving consultation, cultural preservation, heritage protection, education, and public policy.

== See also ==
- Commission of Indian Affairs
