= Cherokee Tribe of Northeast Alabama =

State-recognized tribe in Alabama, United States

- Named after: Cherokee people
- Formation: 1980
- Founded at: Pinson, Alabama
- Type: state-recognized tribe, nonprofit organization
- Tax ID no.: EIN 63-0849027
- Legal status: Civic/social organizations; Arts/culture/humanities nonprofits; Charities
- Purpose: A23: Cultural, Ethnic Awareness
- Location: United States
- Members: 3,000
- Revenue: $25,678 (2022)
- Funding: grants, membership dues
- Staff: 0 (2022)
- Website: cherokeetribeofnortheastalabama.org
- Formerly called: Cherokees of Jackson County

The Cherokee Tribe of Northeast Alabama (CTNEAL), formerly the Cherokees of Jackson County, is a state-recognized tribe in Alabama. They have about 3,000 members. The tribe has a representative on the Alabama Indian Affairs Commission and the Inter-Tribal Council of Alabama. They are not federally recognized as a Native American tribe.

== Organization ==
CTNEAL has more than 3,000 members, most living within the state of Alabama. The state-recognized tribe has a constitution that governs the leadership government and members. It elects a Principal Chief, two Vice Chiefs as well as a tribal Council. Elections are held every four years.

The CTNEAL is a member of the National Congress of American Indians, which lists Larry Smith of Pinson, Alabama, as their current principal chief.

CTNEAL members identify as being of Cherokee descent. As members of a state-recognized tribe, CTNEAL individuals are eligible to participate in organizations such as the National Congress of American Indians. They can market their arts and crafts as being Native American or American Indian–made under the 1990 Indian Arts and Crafts Act but they are not eligible for federal benefits.

The Eastern Band of Cherokee Indians and Cherokee Nation have listed the Cherokee Tribe of Northeast Alabama as a fraudulent group.

=== Nonprofit ===
In 1980, the Cherokees of Jackson County Cherokee Tribe of Northeast Alabama formed a 501(c)(3) nonprofit organization.

Edna Fowler, based in Boaz, Alabama, was the registered agent as of 2018. The nonprofit legally changed names in 1983 and 1997. The tribe was formally known as Cherokees of Jackson County. Under the leadership of Dr. Lindy Martin, the group changed its name. As the tribe grew in membership, it changed its name to the Cherokee Tribe of Northeast Alabama to reflect a larger geographic area.

== Petition for federal recognition ==
The Cherokee Tribe of Northeast Alabama sent a letter of intent to petition for federal recognition in 1981. However, the tribe has not proceeded with submitting a completed petition for federal recognition.

== Activities ==
The tribe and 501(c)(3) are involved with many events and services not limited to the following: community, school, art, demonstrations, health information, and Native American activities. Events and activities are held in and out of the state.

The CTNEAL is a voting member of the National Congress of American Indians.

== Membership criteria ==
The Cherokee Tribe of Northeast Alabama requires all potential members to have verifiable Cherokee descent. The rolls are open to any person who can document Cherokee ancestry. It does not require a minimum blood quantum.

== See also ==
- Alabama Indian Affairs Commission
- Cherokee heritage groups
- Eastern Cherokee, Southern Iroquois, and United Tribes of South Carolina
- Echota Cherokee Tribe of Alabama
- Georgia Tribe of Eastern Cherokee
- Native American identity in the United States
- National Congress of American Indians
