= Haliwa-Saponi Indian Tribe =

State-recognized tribe in North Carolina, United States

- Official seal of the Haliwa-Saponi Indian Tribe
- Named after: Halifax, Warren, and Saponi people
- Formation: 1953
- Type: state-recognized tribe, Government organization
- Tax ID no.: EIN 23-7377602
- Legal status: Government Organization
- Purpose: A23: Cultural, Ethnic Awareness
- Location: Hollister, North Carolina, United States
- Members: approximately 4,300
- Executive Director, Tribal Administrator: Meshelia Lynch (Interim)
- Revenue: $3,111,855 (2020)
- Expenses: $2,915,7762 (2020)
- Funding: grants, program services, investment income, fundraising events
- Staff: 105 (2020)
- Website: haliwa-saponi.gov

The Haliwa-Saponi Indian Tribe is a state-recognized tribe in North Carolina. The tribe is headquartered in Hollister, North Carolina. It is not included on the list of federally recognized tribes maintained by the Bureau of Indian Affairs.

Formerly named the Haliwarnash Croatan Indian Club, and before that the Essex Indian Club, they adopted their current form of government in 1953 and were recognized in 1965 by the state of North Carolina. The tribe has created schools and other institutions to preserve its culture and identity, from which members construed as Black were excluded. They primarily belong to Protestant Christian churches, mostly Baptist and Methodist.

== Name ==
The neologism Haliwa is a portmanteau of the Halifax and Warren counties. The tribe appended the term Saponi in 1979 to reflect the Indigenous people who had lived in the area they resided in, a method common among Southeastern groups.

== Government ==
The Haliwa-Saponi Indian Tribe is governed by an 11-member council elected to three-year staggered terms by the members of the tribe. These include an elected chief and vice-chief. The tribe is headquartered in the Chief W.R. Richardson Tribal Government Complex in Hollister.

== History ==
The Haliwa-Saponi claim descent from the Tuscarora, Accomac, Cherokee, Occaneechi, Tutelo, Nansemond, and Saponi. Genealogical research by Paul Heinegg documents them descending instead from free African-American families originating in Virginia, comparing them to the Brass Ankles, Carmelites, Melungeons, and Lumbee. Scholars termed the group a racial isolate, and some locals previously had colloquially called them Brass Ankles. Proposed state recognition legislation described the tribe as descending from the Saponi, Nansemond, and related Native groups of the region.

=== 18th century ===
==== Decline of Indian trade ====
Vice Chief of the Haliwa-Saponi Marvin Richardson, and consultant for non-federally recognized tribes C. S. Everett state historical documentation shows the modern Haliwa-Saponi tribe as descending from a group that arose during the 1730s, as the Indian trade declined. Paul Heinegg states genealogical analysis indicates the families who later made up the Haliwa-Saponi were lighter-skinned descendants of free African-American families, mostly from Virginia. He noted they mostly descended from unions between white women and Black men, and had migrated into Northeastern North Carolina to purchase land at prices former indentured servants could afford.

The divisive Tuscarora and Yamasee wars affected colonists, Native Americans and Indian trade in Virginia and the Carolinas. The Saponi made an arrangement with the remaining band of Tuscarora in April 1733, to live with them and under their sovereignty. Richardson and Everett claim that the majority of the Saponi migrated to North Carolina with traders and planters, settling in what are now Halifax and Warren counties. They also claim that during the 1730s and 1740s, the Saponi intermarried with European colonists and free Black people, but stopped specifically after the American Revolution.

==== Last documentation of the Saponi ====
In 1740, most of the remaining Saponi in Virginia moved north to Pennsylvania and New York, where they joined the Haudenosaunee Confederacy. After the American Revolutionary War and the Sullivan Expedition, they fled with the Haudenosaunee to Canada, as four of the Six Nations were allied with the British and their territories in New York State were being seized. The British government provided land and some relocation assistance to their Haudenosaunee allies. This was the last time in which the Saponi appeared in the historical record. Centuries later, a remnant of them resided in Brantford, Ontario.

==== Community formation ====
From the 1730s to the 1770s, the ancestors of the modern Haliwa-Saponi tribe coalesced in "The Meadows" of southwestern Halifax County, North Carolina immediately after the American Revolution. The Meadows was later known as the largest settlement of free Black people in North Carolina. In North Carolina, the population of free African-Americans in a county generally increased with its slave population.

The 1790 United States census shows the Haliwa progenitors Benjamin and William Richardson as the heads of the only families of free non-white people in Halifax County, excluding one family of two people. William was given 640 acres of land in the county for his service as a private in the Revolutionary War. Some of the main ancestral families that settled in The Meadows were the Richardson, Copeland, Harris, Hedgepeth, and Lynch families. They were recorded as free African-American families originating in Virginia. (Note: Over 80% of "other free persons" on the censuses of 1790-1810 in North Carolina originated from free African-Americans in Virginia during the colonial period.)

=== 19th century ===
Free Black people by county 1860 Census, North Carolina
County	Population
Halifax	2,452
Pasquotank	1,507
Robeson	1,462
Wake	1,446
Craven	1,332
Top five counties shown.

Over the course of the 19th century, the ancestors of the tribe maintained an endogamous community in modern Halifax, Warren, Nash, and Franklin counties and generally practiced endogamy. Having become Christian, they belonged mostly to the predominant Protestant churches: the first they established was Jeremiah Methodist Church in the mid-1870s in Halifax County. Later some of the congregation left and built the Pine Chapel Baptist Church. A later study described the Meadows as being the largest free Black settlement in 1860s North Carolina. It specifically referred to them as "old issues", meaning Black people who were free before the Civil War.

==== Beginning of identity assertion ====
The first recorded assertions of Native American lineage by the ancestors of the tribe began after the end of Reconstruction, when many claimed to be Cherokee, or Tuscarora. These assertions were often challenged, and seen as vague. Richardson and Everett state they attempted to organize as a tribe from 1877 to 1920.

With the rise of Jim Crow laws in the late 19th century, the ancestors of the Haliwa-Saponi and African Americans were disfranchised by state law in 1896 and a new constitution in 1899 that was discriminatory in the application of poll taxes, literacy tests and grandfather clauses. This was the pattern for every former Confederate state, beginning with Mississippi in 1890 and proceeding through 1908. Halifax county was noted to have the most significant Black vote in North Carolina at this time.

=== 20th century ===
Richardson and Everett note that issues of race and ethnicity became more complex when numerous African-American laborers were recruited in 1906 for a growing timber industry and moved with their families into the Meadows area. By 1908 a few African-American families began to attend Pine Chapel Baptist Church. Some of the congregation was dismayed, and split off to form a third church, St. Paul's Baptist Church. In the 1950s, African-Americans began joining the congregation of St. Paul's, leading to some members founding the "Essex Indian Club", via which they founded a fourth church, the Mount Bethel Indian Baptist Church. The Essex Indian Club later developed into the Haliwa-Saponi tribal government.

==== Segregated schools ====
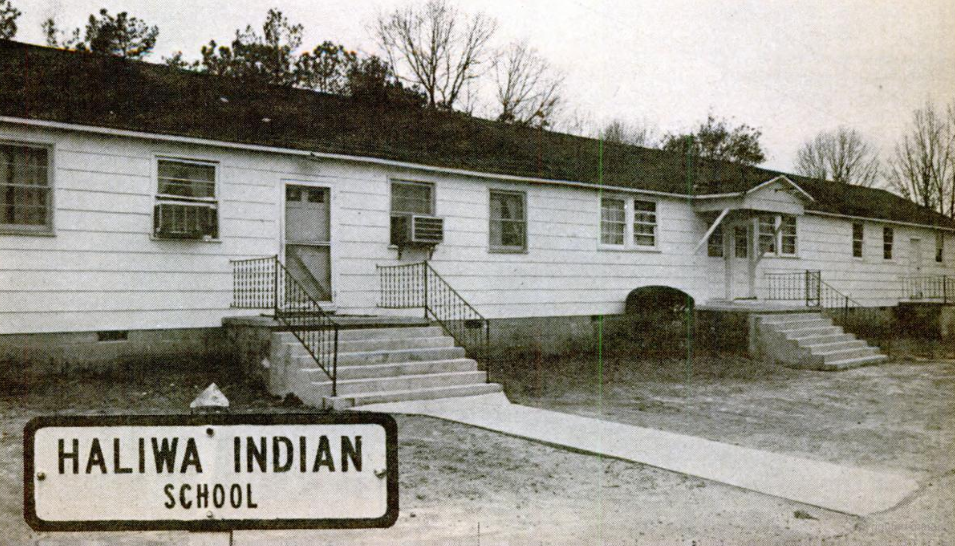
Haliwa Indian School, North Carolina.

Forbidden from white schools, the community formed Bethlehem School in Warren County and the Secret Hill School in Halifax County. At this time, few official records of the period recorded any people as Native American. The schools were eventually closed by the county, and they went to school with African-Americans afterwards. Genealogist Paul Heinegg, who labels them as an "invented North Carolina Indian tribe", proposed their successful ability to attain separate schools from freedmen was a major factor in the creation of the narrative of them being Native American.

Later in the 20th century, the Indian schools closed, as desegregation guidelines forbade the use of local or state funds for racially discriminatory purposes.

==== Changing of birth certificates ====
Several leaders in the 1940s, including John C. Hedgepeth, tried to have birth certificates of members indicate their community identity. In 1965, nearly four hundred people filed a successful suit which referred to them as members of the "Haliwa Indian race". They had "colored" removed from their birth certificates, drivers licenses, and marriage licenses in a judgment that indicated they did not associate with Black people socially.

==== Later accounts ====
When Professor Robert K. Thomas visited with the Haliwa in the summer of 1978, he stated that many of the members referred to themselves as Cherokee. He noted they rejected the identifier of Haliwa, but that it was gaining acceptance as time went on. The same year, author Clyde Pulley published "Blacks who Pass for Indian & White", where he discussed the Haliwa-Saponi, who he narrated he had researched for two years. In an interview, he claimed "illegitimate Indians" were obtaining millions via government programs for Native Americans, stating "We are using taxpayers' money...when other Blacks are denied money and because the money is spread so thin among these 'new tribes,' real Indians are not getting money that was appropriated for them."

== Tribal organization and schism ==
The group organized in the late 1940s under the name Haliwarnash Croatan Indian Club. They later dropped the reference to the Croatan and shortened the name to the Haliwa Indian Club, due to membership mostly being in the counties of Halifax and Warren, rather than Nash. Leader W.R. Richardson stated he dropped the "r" from "Haliwar" because Haliwa sounded similar to Chippewa, Hiawatha, and Catawba. Historians Ruth Y. Wetmore and Michael Hill wrote that the club's membership roll became the authority on Native identity, and that the collective Native identity of the group was "relatively recent".

=== Schism ===
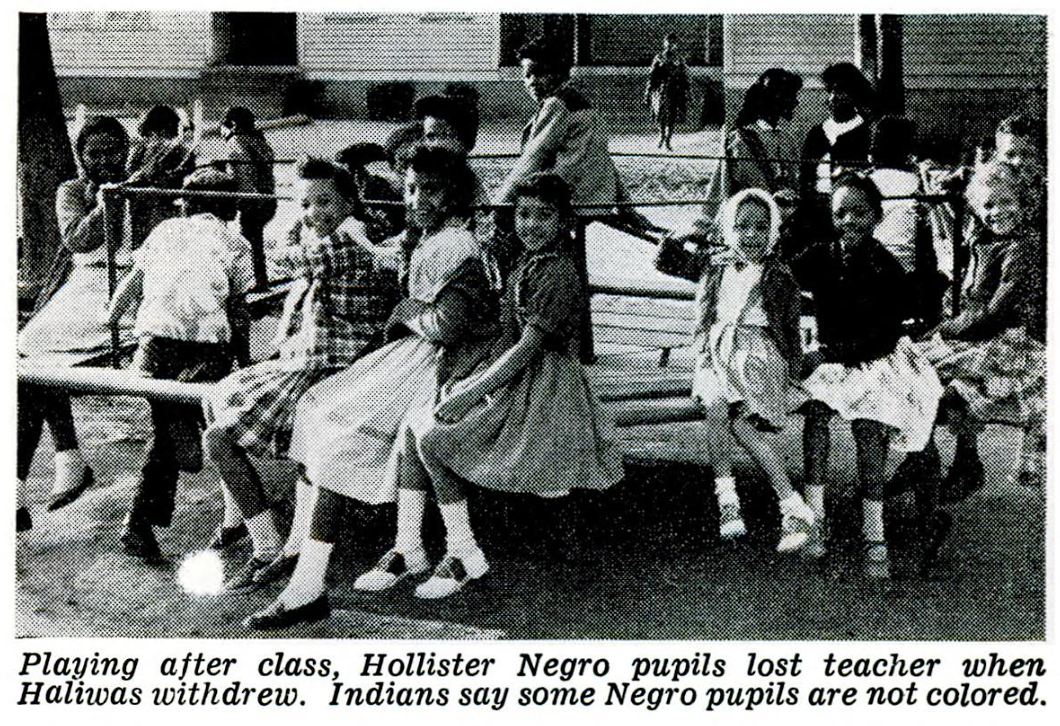
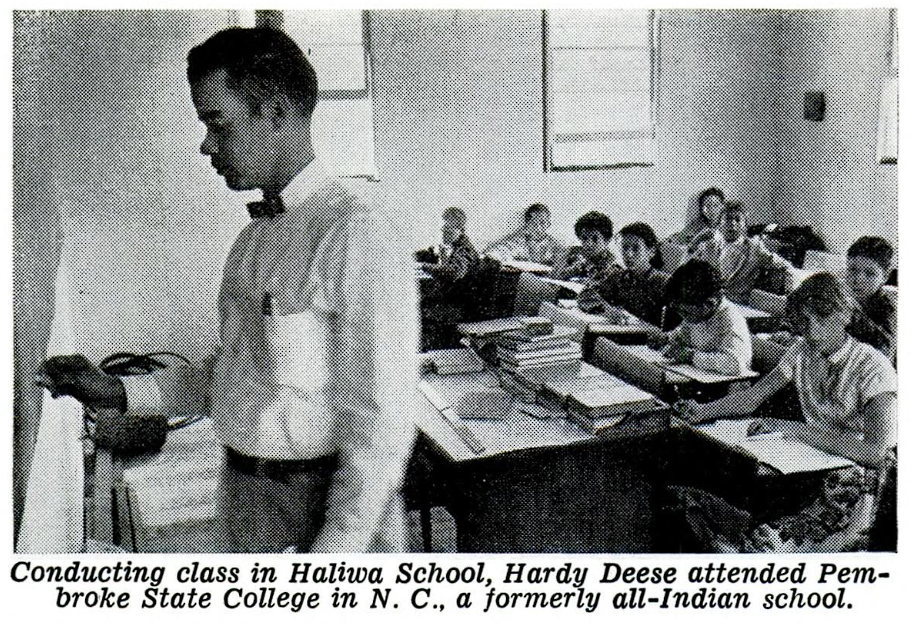
Students from the "Hollister Negro" and Haliwa Indian schools, 1957.

After the US Supreme Court ruled in Brown vs. The Board of Education (1954) that segregation of public schools was unconstitutional, the state undertook resistance by what was called the Pearsall Plan, which allowed municipalities to make funds available to create private neighborhood schools. A small faction of the group took advantage of this provision to build and operate a private Haliwa Indian School. However, members of their community that they considered to be Black were excluded from the school. This divided families among the group, as some did not want to adopt an anti-Black position, instead choosing cooperation with Black Americans. The two factions were from the same families, as the rival leaders were brothers in-law.

Their school operated from 1957 to 1958. Tribal members paid for supplies and materials, the building, and maintenance, much as parents do at parochial schools. The state rejected their request for grants to continue the school, and the 104-120 students were assigned to Black schools. In August of 1958, their request to be assigned to white schools was rejected. In 1957, the Haliwa Indian Tribe built the Saponi Indian Church, since renamed Mt. Bethel Indian Baptist Church, in Warren County. Other people of color, including within the community itself (newly termed Hollister Negroes), resented their separate ethnic identity within the segregated social system.

==== Further developments ====
In 1972, researcher William S. Pollitzer conducted genetic research comparing the two factions via red cell antigens. He referred to the "Indian" subgroup as more genetically fit than the Black one (then termed "Hollister Negroes") due to selection. Decades later, scholar Renate Bartl referred to the research as highly questionable and inaccurate, relying on problematic and unproven assumptions.

The increasing African-American activism for civil rights highlighted some of the tensions between the ethnicities. By 1972 rather than being affiliated with local county associations, the Haliwa-Saponi churches were affiliated with the Burnt Swamp Association in Robeson County, where the Lumbee are present. They were affiliated with white and Burnt Swamp association churches at the state convention level, but not Black ones. One Black leader was noted to believe the "Haliwa phenomenon" was a white tactic to divide the Black vote in the county, as the group tended to vote similarly to white citizens.

In 1979, Jet Magazine referred to the Haliwa Indian Tribe as a group of "2000 light-skinned Black people" who had changed their race to Indian. They interviewed members of the community who had chosen to either remain Black or become "Haliwa Indian". A local Black family mentioned W.R. Richardson had offered them the opportunity to change to Indian, but they refused. Another local stated four of her siblings changed their race to Indian, no longer interacting much with her afterwards.

=== State recognition ===
In 1965, North Carolina formally recognized the Haliwa Indian Tribe. In 1967 the Haliwa opened their tenth annual Haliwa pow-wow to the public, inviting state and local officials and Indians from other states. They added Saponi to the tribal name in 1979 to reflect the Indigenous people who had lived in the area they resided in.

In 1974, the Haliwa-Saponi incorporated a 501(c)(3) nonprofit organization. Its mission statement is "The mission of the Haliwa-Saponi indian Tribe is to protect the interests, identity, and rights of the Haliwa-Saponi Indian people and to promote the cultural and traditional heritage of the Haliwa-Saponi people of Halifax, Warren, and surrounding counties." In 1981, they joined the National Congress of American Indians. When applying for federal acknowledgement in 1979, the club changed their name to the Haliwa-Saponi Indian Tribe, and added Saponi and Nansemond identities to their tribal identity. They attached the name of the historic Saponi to add to the credibility of their Indian identity. In 1997, the state legislature passed Senate Bill 1074 that updated state recognition to the Haliwa Saponi Tribe of North Carolina.

== Modern developments ==
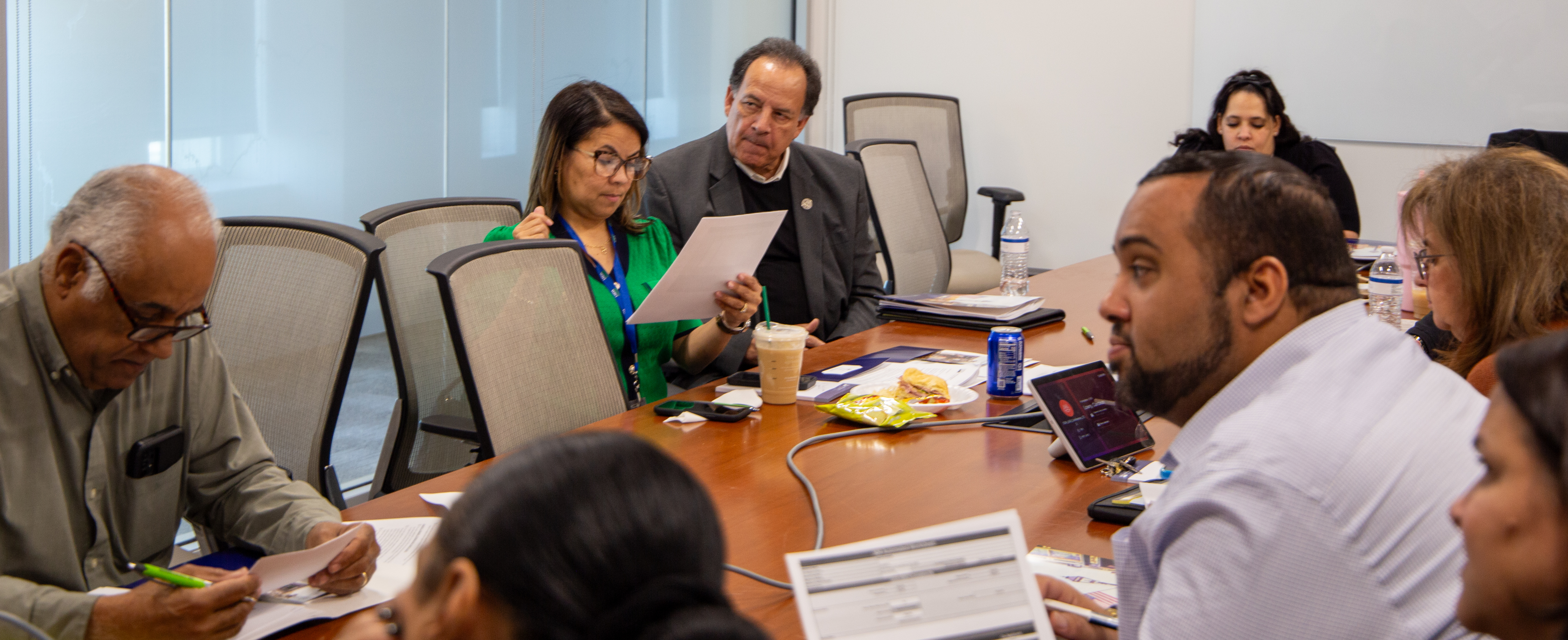
Members of the Waccamaw-Siouan, Lumbee, Haliwa-Saponi, and Coharie tribes at a training meeting by the North Carolina Commission of Indian Affairs in 2025.

In 2011, the Haliwa-Saponi Tribe was audited by the state of North Carolina and found to have submitted an inaccurate grant application. "The audit, prompted by a citizen's complaint, alleged false information was included on the tribe's grant application to Golden LEAF for the project." "It found the tribe misrepresented itself in saying it had tribal council review and approval for the grant, an approved loan for $700,000 and a $600,000 HUD grant for matching funds, because HUD does not allow Indian Housing Block Grant funds for projects rejected by tribes.

=== Federal recognition attempts ===
The Haliwa-Saponi Indian Tribe is not currently federally recognized. The tribe does not appear among the petitions currently being considered or the petitions resolved through the Office of Federal Acknowledgment under 25 C.F.R. Part 83. The tribe has also pursued federal recognition through congressional legislation.

In 2022, Representative G. K. Butterfield introduced H.R. 9536, the Haliwa-Saponi Indian Tribe of North Carolina Recognition Act. The bill was referred to the House Committee on Natural Resources and did not advance before the conclusion of the 117th Congress.

Representative Don Davis introduced H.R. 2929 on April 17, 2025. The bill would extend a federal government-to-government relationship to the tribe. It was referred to the House Committee on Natural Resources.

== Education ==
A faction of the group founded the Haliwa-Saponi Tribal School in 1957, which was assisted by the state as a public school. All other public schools had long been segregated as white or black (all people of color) under state law, and the faction claimed a separate identity. Members they construed to be Black were not allowed into the school, despite being from the same families. The school closed in the late 1960s following the court-ordered integration of public schools on constitutional grounds.

Testing irregularities in the 2010-11 academic year at Haliwa-Saponi Tribal School resulted in nine students' biology test scores being invalidated and Haliwa-Saponi Tribal School Principal Chenoa Davis resigning. Community members expressed concerns related to the investigation during a meeting of the school board. Ronald Richardson, tribal chief of the Haliwa-Saponi, said that the tribe should work out its own problems without newspaper publicity. School board Chairman Gideon Lee declined to identify the teacher in question who downloaded state biology test information, but said that action has been taken against those determined to be involved.

The tribe established the Haliwa-Saponi Day Care Center, to serve children aged two to five. The Haliwa-Saponi Tribal School is a public charter school, bases its curriculum on the North Carolina state standard course of study and offers small classrooms, technology, and American Indian studies. The school had 161 enrolled students in 2020.

== Culture and activities ==
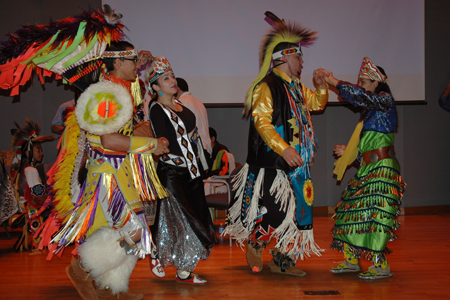
Haliwa-Saponi Tribe members dance in a celebration of Native American Heritage Month at the Meyera Oberndorf Library in Virginia Beach in 2011.

The Haliwa-Saponi hosts an annual powwow on the third weekend in April on the dance grounds at the Haliwa-Saponi Tribal School. They launched it in 1965 to celebrate their state recognition. Completely originating from the recent Pan-Indian cultural movement, the powwow "also builds on local and regional values, and ideas about tribe, community and race." Held the third weekend of April, the pow-wow is funded in part by ad sales, donations, corporate funding and gate receipts, in addition to grants from the North Carolina Arts Council. The initial funding from the Arts Council was applied for by tribal member Arnold Richardson in 1969, for the purpose of teaching the tribe Haudenosaunee dances via cultural awareness workshops, as he found the performances of the Haliwa-Saponi "un-authentic", and stereotypical.

The tribe now operates a cultural class for tribal citizens of all ages. The program includes instruction in Haliwa-Saponi history, Native American arts and crafts, pow-wow style dancing, singing, and drumming. Prior to the Pan-Indian renaissance, virtually no Native American culture was found among the Haliwa-Saponi.

== Notable Haliwa-Saponi ==
- Brooke Simpson, contestant on The Voice
- Sky Lakota-Lynch, Tony Award-nominated actor
