= Dark Water Rising =

Native American musical group

Dark Water Rising is a Native American group featuring an Indie rock/Blues sound. Based in Robeson County, North Carolina, they formed in 2010 and won the 2010 Native American Music Award for "Debut Duo or Group of the Year". In 2011 they gained two nominations in the Aboriginal Peoples Choice Awards, Single of the Year for their song Hooked and Best Folk/Acoustic CD for their debut album Dark Water Rising. The band tours regularly in North Carolina and across the east coast, and was featured on the nationally broadcast NPR show The Story with Dick Gordon. Members of Dark Water Rising belong to the Lumbee and Coharie tribes of North Carolina.

== Discography ==
Year	Title
2010	Dark Water Rising
2013	Grace & Grit - Chapter 1

== Band members ==
(Current members)

- Charly Lowry - Lead Vocals and rhythm guitar
- Aaron Locklear- Drums / Percussion
- Corey Locklear - Guitar
- Zack Hargett - Bass

(Past members)

- Tony murnahan|Tony Murnahan - Bass and guitar
- Shay Jones - Drums & Percussion and backing vocals
- Ciera Dial Locklear- Keyboard and vocals
- Brittany Jacobs- Saxophone, percussion and vocals
- Eric Locklear- Bass guitar
- Emily Musolino - Lead Vocals and electric guitar

== Awards and nominations ==
- Native American Music Awards (NAMA/NAMMYS):

            Won: • Best Inspirational Recording (2014) for "Grace and Grit Chapter I"
                 • Debut Duo or Group of the Year (2010)

            Nominated: • Single of the Year (2011) for Hometown Hero

- Aboriginal People's Choice Awards:
  - Nominated: Single of the Year (2011) for Hooked
  - Nominated: Best Folk/Acoustic CD (2011) for Dark Water Rising
