= Ebarb, Louisiana =

Unincorporated community in Louisiana, U.S.

Ebarb
- Native American Spaniard. Unincorporated community
- Location of Ebarb in Louisiana
- Coordinates: 31°37′53″N 93°45′14″W
- Country: United States
- State: Louisiana
- Parish: Sabine
- Elevation Highest point is near Sepulvado loop: 217 ft (66 m)
- Zip Code: 71462

Ebarb is an unincorporated community in Sabine Parish, Louisiana, United States. It is located along Louisiana Highway 482, west of Zwolle and east of the Toledo Bend Reservoir. The American Indian community has a multicultural heritage with strong Spanish and French influences.

Many residents are enrolled in the state-recognized Choctaw-Apache Tribe of Ebarb. All Ebarbians are lineal descendants of Spanish Lieutenant Governor Antonio Gil y' Barbo. During the 'English-Only' Movement the government changed the spelling of many families' names, which is how the name Barbo evolved to both Y'Barbo and Ebarb.

Many residents of Ebarb attend St. Ann's Catholic Church.

The community was named after Don Antonio Gil Y'Barbo. He was born in 1729 at Fort Los Adaes in Nueva España (New Spain), and married Maria Padilla (now Paddie). Gil Y'Barbo held ranches on both sides of the Sabine River. According to oral tradition, Ebarb was founded by Alcario Y'barbo, son of a member of Gil Y'Barbo's family.

The community is also known for its basketball tradition.

== Education ==
Public schools in Sabine Parish are operated by the Sabine Parish School Board. The community of Ebarb is zoned to Ebarb School (Grades PK-12).
