= Choctaw-Apache Tribe of Ebarb =

State-recognized tribe in Louisiana, United States

- Named after: Choctaw people, Apache people, Ebarb, Louisiana
- Type: state-recognized tribe, nonprofit organization
- Tax ID no.: EIN 72-0875349
- Legal status: school, charity
- Purpose: B82: Scholarships, Student Financial Aid Services
- Location: Zwolle, Louisiana, United States
- Members: 11,200 (2022)
- Chairman: Thomas N. Rivers
- Revenue: $10,211 (2018)
- Expenses: $14,001 (2018)
- Funding: grants, contributions
- Staff: 3 (2018)
- Website: choctawapachetribeebarb.org

The Choctaw-Apache Tribe of Ebarb is a state-recognized tribe and nonprofit organization in Louisiana. The members of the Tribe are descendants of Choctaw and Lipan Apache people and are required to prove lineal descent as part of their state-approved membership process. Their office is based in Zwolle, Louisiana, while their Powwow Grounds are in Ebarb, Louisiana. Both locations are in Sabine Parish, Louisiana, where the Choctaw-Apache community has lived since the early 18th century.

== History ==
In 1721, the Spanish built the presidio or outpost, Nuestra Señora del Pilar de Los Adaes. Los Adaes served as the capital of the Spanish province of Tejas from 1729 to 1770. Located about 15 miles from Natchitoches, it was established as the easternmost outpost to prevent the French from encroaching on Spanish territory. For approximately 50 years, the French and others engaged in illicit trading through Los Adaes of horses, cattle, and Lipan Apache (known as Canneci Tinné) slaves. During the final decade of French rule, the majority of enslaved Indigenous people at Natchitoches were Lipan Apache. Nuestra Señora del Pilar was defended by Mestizo and Spanish soldiers who married local Indigenous women, including those of the Caddo and Adai tribes, as well as formerly enslaved Lipan Apache. When the Spanish dissolved the fort in 1773 and ordered the soldiers to return to San Antonio, many chose to stay behind with their families along East Texas, while others moved to areas between the fort and the Sabine River, establishing communities near what is now Zwolle and Ebarb.

In the mid-1700s, some Choctaw migrated into present-day Louisiana looking for new hunting grounds. Shortly after the United States purchase of the Louisiana Territory in 1803, Dr. John Sibley, "the first Indian Agent with jurisdiction over the New Orleans territory", provided refuge to North Louisiana Choctaw in Natchitoches and resettled a few Choctaw families west of Los Adaes on land for farming and raising stock. Dr. Sibley's reports are on record at the Smithsonian Institution and Library of Congress. During the Mexican War for Independence (1810-1821), many Lipan Apache who supported the revolution fled the conflict and moved to the east side of the Sabine River to join their recently enslaved relatives. Additionally, the Choctaw-Apache, west of the Sabine, sought refuge with their kin on the east side during the 1839 Cordova Rebellion and the Texas Cherokee Wars. As the community settled the land, some of its members registered land claims to property in Bayou Scie, Sabine Parish. In the 1870 Census, twenty-one Choctaw families were recorded along the eastern bank of the Sabine River. Then, in 1881, sixty-two Choctaw-Apache families were documented nearby in Bayou Scie during a Catholic population census. Throughout the 1800s, however, Anglo-American settlement in Louisiana was encouraged, encroaching on the territory occupied by the Choctaw-Apache people. The construction of a railroad depot in 1898 established the town of Zwolle, which promoted new industries like timber and further encouraged White settlement.

Into the 20th century, the Choctaw-Apache community near Zwolle transitioned from farming, hunting, and ranching to wage labor in the timber industry. They lived along the east bank of the Sabine River until the states of Texas and Louisiana created a project in the 1960s to dam it for flood control and electricity generation. The states claimed 180,000 acres of the ancestral land to build the Toledo Bend Reservoir, completed in 1968. The people in the area were forced to move.

== Language ==
The Tribe historically spoke a dialect of Spanish dating from the establishment of Los Adaes. Due to the community's history, their dialect is derived from rural Mexican Spanish of the late 18th century, and bears little resemblance to Isleño Spanish. A similar dialect has been spoken around Moral, west of Nacogdoches, on the other side of the Toledo Bend Reservoir, which also derives from the Los Adaes settlement. This dialect is very endangered; as of the 1980s, there were no more than 50 fluent speakers on either side of the Sabine River.

== Membership ==
In 2008, the group reported they had 2,300 members living in the area and additional members in other regions.

== Organization ==
The group formed a 501(c)(3) nonprofit organization in 1977, with the mission "to assist tribe members and obtain federal recognition. Continued to work on member documentation needed for federal recognition."

== State-recognition ==
In 1978, Louisiana officially recognized (state-recognized) the Choctaw-Apache Community of Ebarb through legislative action, House Concurrent Resolution 2.

Louisiana House Bill 660 established the Native American Commission in 2018 to promote Native American culture and identify the needs facing that community. One member from each of the 15 recognized tribes serves on the commission. The Tribe's Chief, Thomas N. Rivers, serves on the board as the Chairman of the Native American Commission for the State of Louisiana.

== Petition for federal recognition ==
On March 22, 1978, John W. Procell submitted a letter of intent to the U.S. Department of the Interior, petitioning for federal recognition on behalf of the Choctaw-Apache Community of Ebarb, as per the Federal Acknowledgment Process (FAP) outlined in the 1978 regulation 25 C.F.R. Part 54. In the same year, Raymond L. Ebarb sent the petition for federal recognition; however, in July 2023, there was no active petition process with the Bureau of Indian Affairs. As of 2024, the Tribe continues to seek federal recognition. The Federally Recognized Indian Tribe List Act (108 Stat. 4791, 4792) of 1994 establishes three ways for a Native American group to gain federal acknowledgment: (1) through the administrative procedures (FAP) outlined in 25 C.F.R. Part 83, (2) by an Act of Congress, or (3) through a decision issued by a United States court.

== Activities ==
The group hosts a biannual powwow in mid-April and November in Noble, Louisiana.
