= Piqua Shawnee Tribe =

State-recognized tribe in Alabama

- Named after: Piqua town, Shawnee people
- Formation: nonprofit (2025_
- Tax ID no.: EIN 33-4733382
- Legal status: Active
- Purpose: Cultural, Ethnic Awareness (A23)
- Headquarters: Oxford, Alabama (nonprofit)
- Location: Birmingham, Alabama (state-recognized tribe), United States
- Members: 300 (2022)
- Official language: English
- Chairman: Gary Hunt
- Website: piquashawnee.gov

The Piqua Shawnee Tribe is a state-recognized tribe in Alabama. The organization is not a federally recognized American Indian tribe. The federally recognized Shawnee Tribe and Absentee Shawnee Tribe of Indians regard the Piqua Shawnee Tribe as a fraudulent tribe.

== Name ==
Piqua was the name of a historical Shawnee town near the Mad River in Ohio. The name Piqua referred to "a man that sprang up out of the ashes". The Shawnee people are an Indigenous people of the Northeastern Woodlands.

== Organization ==
The Piqua Shawnee Tribe is based in Birmingham, Alabama and Oxford, Alabama. They had 300 members in 2022.

In 2022, their administration was:

- Principal Chief: Gary Hunt, Medicine Hawk
- Second Chief: Duane Everhart
- Treasurer: Rodney Phillips
- Secretary: Jan Fraz
- Tribal Mother: Anita Penington
- Ceremonial Keeper and State Representative: Don Raknin
- Tribal Representative: Morgan Silvers
- Senior Advisor to the Chief & Preservation Officer: Barbara Lehman

The Piqua Shawnee Tribe is listed on the website of the National Congress of American Indians (NCAI) as a state-recognized tribe in Alabama. They are a member of NCAI.

The Piqua Shawnee Tribe incorporated as a nonprofit organization in Oxford, Alabama in 2025.

== History ==
Alabama began a process for state-recognition of tribes in 1984. Requests for recognition go through the Alabama Indian Affairs Commission. The Piqua Shawnee Tribe was granted state recognition on July 10, 2001. It is among nine state-recognized tribes granted recognition in Alabama. The Shawnee Tribe, the Absentee Shawnee Tribe of Indians, the Eastern Band of Cherokee Indians, and some other federally recognized American Indian tribes regard the Piqua Shawnee Tribe as a fraudulent tribe.

== See also ==
- Pekowi
- Shawnee
- State-recognized tribes in the United States
