= Four Winds Tribe Louisiana Cherokee =

Cultural organization in Louisiana, U.S.

Four Winds Tribe Louisiana Cherokee Confederation
- Louisiana Cherokee Confederacy
- Logo of the Four Winds Tribe Louisiana Cherokee Confederation
- Type: Nonprofit
- Tax ID no.: 72-1295150
- Legal status: 501(c)(3)
- Headquarters: Leesville, Louisiana, U.S.
- Official language: English
- General Secretary: Darline Smith
- Principal Chief: Justin Willis
- Vice Chief: Larry Willis
- Website: fourwindstribelacherokee.com

The Four Winds Tribe Louisiana Cherokee, officially named the Four Winds Tribe Louisiana Cherokee Confederation, is a state-recognized Native American tribe in Louisiana. The tribe is not one of the Cherokee tribal nations recognized by the U.S. federal government.

The tribe comprised 3,000 families in 2002. Tribal members identify as descendants of tribes that fled into the Neutral Ground in response to the Indian Removal Act. This is contested by the Cherokee Nation, and some scholarship alternatively states they are Louisiana Redbones.

The tribe is organized as a 501(c)(3) nonprofit, with tribal headquarters located in Leesville. The tribe hosts an annual powwow each fall, and sponsors classes in tribal arts.

== Historical narrative and scholarship ==
=== 19th century ===
Scholar Renate Bartl writes the members of the tribe are Redbones originating in South Carolina, who later adopted a Cherokee identity. Tribal members claim to be descendants of tribes that were affected by the Indian Removal Act of 1830, with many small groups of the tribe during the forced removal, escaping, and crossing into the Mississippi River, and settling into western Louisiana, known as No Man's Land.

Anthropologist Dayna Lee wrote that the tribe originated when Atakapa people seeking refuge in the Neutral Strip, were later joined by Cherokee, Choctaw, and 'Muscogee Creek' individuals who "dropped off" in western Louisiana during the Indian Removal in the 1830s. Bartl writes that the tribe has provided no evidence of possessing Cherokee descent. She also says there is no evidence indicating a tradition Cherokee settlement in the area. She writes that the misidentification of Joseph Willis as Cherokee could have caused their claim to Cherokee identity, as he had led them from South Carolina to settle in Louisiana.

=== 20th century ===
The organization known as the Four Winds Tribe Louisiana Cherokee Confederacy was formed in 1995. They received state recognition in 1997. Don C. Marler wrote that many Redbones had been joining the tribe at this time.

=== 21st century ===
In 2000, 1,300 families were noted as being part of the tribe, living across parishes including Vernon, Beauregard, Calcasieu, Rapides, and Allen, with 30% of members at the time living in Vernon. In 2000, R.W. Blackwell was reported as Principal Chief, and Cheryl Perkins as Vice Chief. At the time, it was also reported they were planning fundraising activities and scheduled a then upcoming powwow.

On August 5, the Four Winds Tribe held its "Cherokee Tribal Princess Pageant" with multiple age categories for contestants.

On October 29, 2000, the tribe held its first powwow at the West Louisiana Forestry Festival fairgrounds with honored Thomas Muskrat, described as "a full blood Cherokee and currently employed by the Cherokee Nation of Oklahoma." At the powwow, the Four Winds Chief was presented with an eagle feather from Muskrat, who also gave Claude Willis, a man with a terminal illness, a "warrior war bonnet."

In 2002 reporting, the tribe had 3,000 families enrolled.

==== 2010s ====
KPLC reported in 2019 that the Four Winds tribe celebrated the 200th anniversary of the Adams–Onís Treaty, a treaty that gave the United States ownership of Louisiana's No Man's Land. Chief Len Wiggins is recorded as saying “In that time, a lot of the natives, during the Trail of Tears, they went to the Neutral Zone, and would go into hiding from the government [...] We're giving honor to our native ancestors [...] To all of our ancestors that came out of the neutral zone, they endured very hard times in that day.” The tribe celebrated their ancestors with a ceremony which included burying a time capsule that would be opened in a century's time. Mayor Mandy Green of Elizabeth, Louisiana remarked she was thankful that the tribes were a part of her town.

==== 2020s ====
In 2022, the Four Winds Tribe announced its "Tribal Princess," who was to represent the tribe at an upcoming powwow in October of that year.

On March 4, 2026, KPLC reported that the treasurer for the Four Winds Tribe, Shelia Trahan, had been accused of stealing from tribal accounts. Sheriff Doug Hebert reporting that members of the tribe had contacted local law enforcement about possible theft in February of that year, mentioning to detectives that bank statements had shown unauthorized ATM and cash withdrawals. Trahan turned herself in to detectives on March 4, and was booked into jail for felony theft over $25,000, unauthorized use of an access card, and Bank Fraud.

== Recognition efforts ==
=== State recognition ===
On April 1, 1997, HCR 7 was introduced to the Louisiana House session, before it was replaced by HCR 137 which was amended and included a permanent gaming restriction. On May 1, after HCR 137 was approved and sent to the Louisiana senate, it was amended to include a 99-year condition for a gaming license. On May 2, the House agreed to the Senate changes, with the final signed resolution occurring on May 5, 1997.

In 1997, the Louisiana house Concurrent Resolution 137 that recognized the Four Winds Tribe, authored by Representative John Smith, D-Leesville, was passed on May 2, 1997, in a 93–2 vote. The resolution was reported to of been similar to the simultaneous Louisiana Senate Concurrent Resolution 32, written by Senator James Cain, D-Dry Creek, with some differences. The House Resolution requested that the U.S. Congress recognize the confederacy as a tribe, and the other difference being that the governor was requested to grant the tribe a gaming permit for 99 years.

The House Resolution's differences as a result, reportedly caused debate from other legislators in the committee and on the Senate floor who were concerned that the tribe would use its designation to apply for a gambling permit. It was reported tribe members maintained that they only sought cultural recognition.

The Fours Winds Tribe received state recognition in May 1997 after Governor Mike Foster signed a resolution passed by the Louisiana state Senate and House to recognize the Four Winds Tribe as an official Louisiana Indian Tribe.

=== Criticism ===
In a 2025 study, Cherokee scholar Daniel Justice criticized the inclusion of the Four Winds Tribe as a Cherokee organization on the 2020 Census. Justice included discussion on the group as part of a larger discussion of Cherokee heritage claims and their "dangers to Cherokee nationhood, and its consequences for Indian Country as a whole."

Chief Chuck Hoskin Jr. of the Cherokee Nation cites the Four Winds Cherokee when recommending strengthened regulations for the Indian Arts and Crafts Act (IACA). Stating the tribe was not real, he says that the recognition of state-recognized tribes by the act put the Cherokee Nation on the same level as the Four Winds Cherokee, which needed to be changed.

== See also ==
- Cherokee descent
- Cherokee heritage groups
