= Alabama Indian Affairs Commission =

Alabama state government commission

Commission overview
- Formed: 1984; 42 years ago
- Jurisdiction: State of Alabama
- Headquarters: Montgomery, Alabama
- Website: aiac.alabama.gov

Alabama Indian Affairs Commission (AIAC) is an agency of the state government of Alabama, created in 1984 by the Davis-Strong Act (Act No. 84-257) and codified at Code of Alabama § 41-9-708. Headquartered in Montgomery, the commission serves as a liaison between Native Americans in Alabama and local, state, and federal agencies, and develops the criteria under which the state extends recognition to Indian tribes. It represents more than 38,000 American Indian families who are residents of the state.

== History ==
The commission's predecessors date to 1974, when the Governor's Advisory Board on Indian Affairs was established under Governor George Wallace to oversee Native American policy in the state. It was followed in 1976 by the Alabama Creek Indian Council, and in 1978 by the Southwest Alabama Indian Affairs Commission (SAIAC), created by the Mims Act and sponsored by state senator Maston Mims on behalf of the Poarch Band of Creek Indians. The SAIAC's near-exclusive focus on the Poarch Band left the Star Clan of Muscogee Creeks and the state's Choctaw, Cherokee, and other Native American populations without representation.

In 1984, the legislature replaced the SAIAC with a statewide body through the Davis-Strong Act (Act No. 84-257), codified at Code of Alabama § 41-9-708. The legislation was spearheaded by state senator Wendell Mitchell at the urging of the Star Clan of Muscogee Creeks. The act established the commission to represent Native American interests throughout the state and extended state recognition to Alabama tribes.

== Functions ==
The commission acts as a liaison and advocate between Alabama's Native American communities and local, state, and federal agencies, with a focus on connecting tribal communities to resources and funding for social and economic development. It is also tasked with developing the criteria for state recognition of Indian tribes, bands, or groups, and with promoting Native American cultural and religious rights.

== Tribes recognized ==
The commission recognizes nine tribes, all state-recognized under Alabama law:

- Poarch Band of Creek Indians
- Echota Cherokee Tribe of Alabama
- Cherokee Tribe of Northeast Alabama
- Ma-Chis Lower Creek Indian Tribe of Alabama
- Star Clan of Muscogee Creeks
- Cher-O-Creek Intra Tribal Indians
- MOWA Band of Choctaw Indians
- Piqua Shawnee Tribe
- United Cherokee Ani-Yun-Wiya Nation

== Programs and scholarships ==
The AIAC provides many programs, such as Miss Indian Alabama, Native American Business Owner Profile, and the AIAC Scholarship, which supports Alabama residents enrolled in a state-recognized tribe who attend or plan to attend a college or university in the state.
