= MOWA Band of Choctaw Indians =

State-recognized tribe in Alabama, United States

- Named after: Mobile and Washington Counties, Choctaw
- Formation: 1980
- Founded at: Mount Vernon, Alabama
- Type: state-recognized tribe, nonprofit organizations
- Tax ID no.: EIN 63-0820577 (MOWA Band of Choctaw Indian Commission), EIN 01-0766792 (MOWA Choctaw Cultural Center)
- Legal status: civic/social organization, human service organization, ethnic center, charity
- Headquarters: Mount Vernon, Alabama
- Location: United States
- Official language: English
- CEO: Lebaron Byrd
- Subsidiaries: MOWA Choctaw Cultural Center
- Revenue: $2,050,083 (2022)
- Expenses: $1,869,347 (2022)
- Funding: grants, program services
- Staff: 0 (Commission); 3 (Cultural Center) (2022)
- Website: mowachoctawindians.com
- Formerly called: Mobile-Washington County Band of Choctaw Indians of South Alabama

The MOWA Band of Choctaw Indians is a state-recognized tribe located in southwest Alabama, with a population largely based in southern Washington County and some members in northern Mobile County.

The term MOWA is a portmanteau of Mobile and Washington Counties. They were formerly named the Mobile-Washington County Band of Choctaw Indians of South Alabama.

The band's oral traditions trace its tribal lineage to Choctaw people who evaded Indian Removal in the 1830s and remained in Alabama. The Bureau of Indian Affairs declined to federally recognize the group, citing the unreliability of this oral history, and no evidence of Native lineage within the substantial historic documentation of their progenitors. Both parties agree the Band descends from 19th-century families who settled in the counties of Washington and Mobile.

== History ==
The MOWA Band descends from a racially-diverse group of progenitors who settled in the counties of Washington and Mobile in the early 19th century, documented as whites, freed slaves, and free people of color. Their oral history traces their tribal origins to Indigenous people who stayed in Alabama after others were coerced or forced to leave for areas west of the Mississippi River in the 1830s, including descendants of Choctaw groups. Their communities traditionally live on lands ceded by the Choctaw Nation in 1805, on which several families, including those ancestral to the Band, had begun to settle in the early 19th century.

=== 19th century ===
The first documentation of the progenitors of the MOWA Band was in the early 19th century. The Treaty of Dancing Rabbit Creek was the first removal treaty after the 1830 Removal Act. While the MOWA Band stated they had established their descent from the treaty signatories to a high degree, scholars claim the ancestors of the MOWA Band were mostly or often not signatories, and registered and were denied under Article 14 of the Treaty to receive land and citizenship in Mississippi. Fifteen individuals in the Band descend from the signatory Alexander Brashears, who received land under Article 14, and whose descendants married into the community in the late 19th century, after the Civil War.

The oral histories of the Band state Choctaw were joined over time by additional fugitives, both lacking citizenship, and formed their progenitors in the swamplands and forests of southwest Alabama. They initially raised livestock, typically on small, unimproved tracts, then moved into the lumber industry, some selling firewood themselves. Choctaw communities were attested in south Alabama by William Armstrong in 1847.

MOWA Band historian Jacqueline Anderson Matte noted that locals began to call the ancestors of the Band "Cajuns" or "Cajans" in the 1880s, after L. W. McRae, a local senator, mistook them for relatives of the Louisiana Cajuns. Although the group repudiated the term, and described it as pejorative, it likely stuck because it was an easy way to distinguish the community from the area's white and Black populations. The MOWA Band of Choctaw Indians officially retired the exonym "Cajan" after formation. Scholar Angela Pulley Hudson reports that the community numbered around 750 by 1887, when they encountered the Apache internees brought to Mount Vernon.

==== Apache internment at Mt. Vernon ====
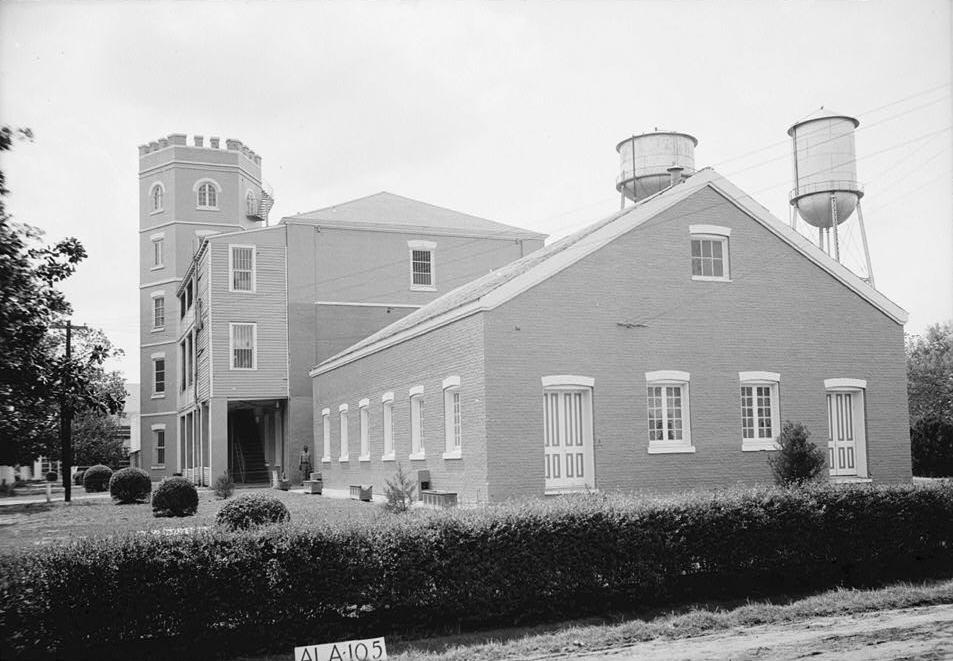
Old Mount Vernon Arsenal Barracks

The community was known for bootlegging during this time; one of their oral traditions stated an Apache man assisted a family in production. Band ancestor Luke Rivers stated they used to perform with fiddles for the Apaches at their internment camp. The Apache purchased violins in Mobile, which Hudson implies was due to enjoying the fiddle performance.

In the 19th century, Apache children were taken from their parents and sent to American Indian boarding schools, which included Carlisle Indian School and the Haskell Institute in Kansas. After school segregation in Alabama, ancestors of the MOWA Band sent their children to these schools due to their missionary schools not servicing a high school curriculum.

=== 20th century ===
In 1910, many ancestors of the Band were listed in the Washington County census as "mixed" Indian for the first time. Local opinions in anthropological reports varied, with a report in 1937 stating locals considered the ancestors of the Band to be of white, African-American and Native American heritage, whereas a later report in 1975 noted local whites and Black people did not widely refer to them as Native American, or even rejected it as an identification.

==== Litigation ====
The community was especially impacted by Jim Crow laws, which reified a binary system for racial categorization. This impacted the ancestors of the MOWA Band educationally, economically, and legally.

In the 1920s, Percy and Daniel Reed, cousins ancestral to the Band, were both convicted under anti-miscegenation laws with respect to their marriages to white women. Both were unable to convince courts their ancestor Rose Reed was Native American, rather than Black, which would have allowed them to avoid convictions. The attendance of Percy's nieces and nephews at white schools was not enough to convince the jury of his whiteness, which scholar Leslie Tucker stated was an indication that one's racial school did not always correspond to their racial identity.

Both successfully appealed their convictions. During an appeal, the prosecution was unable to prove Percy was Black, because the appellate court ruled that the determination of his race had been based upon hearsay and appearance, while a defense witness and even his trial judge deemed him to be of "Indian and Spanish origin". In 1927, in response to cases such as these, the legislature brought in the "one-drop rule", where anyone with any Black heritage was considered Black. As Tucker noted, ancestors of the Band would bring up their discrimination against Black people in courts, displaying the gradations in society that existed after the white-Black binary in society that resulted from the one-drop rule. She suggested this testimony relied on the assumption that a defendant would not discriminate against their own race, and that it offered them a point of commonality with the white "club" whose community they wished to join.

==== Segregation ====
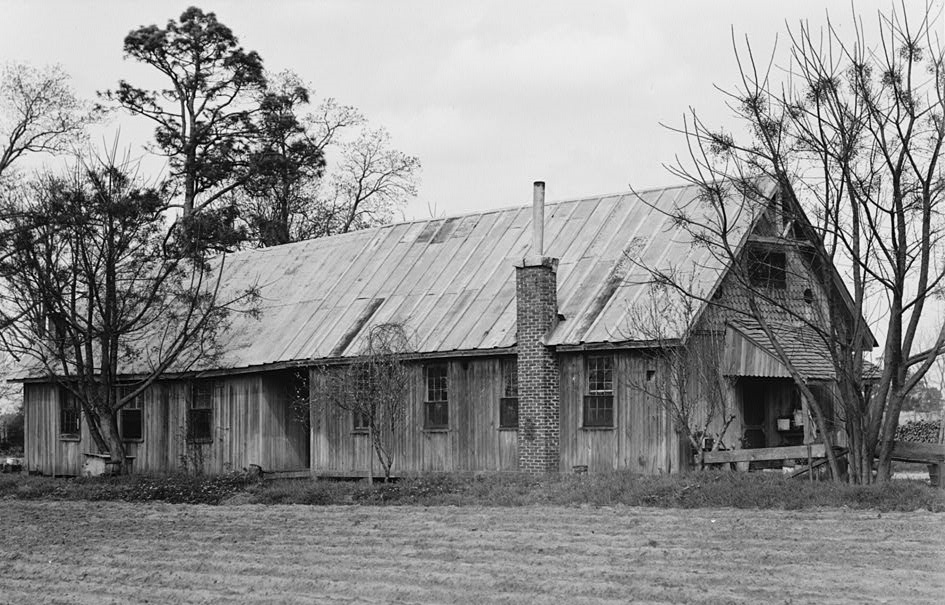
Weaver School, Mobile County, Alabama, founded in 1927.

From 1921, missionaries from the Southern Baptist Church and Methodist Episcopal Church visited the area, bringing formal education and religion to the community. This led to the creation of Indian churches, such as Reeds Chapel, which became a center for community life. These newly established Indian missions doubled as school buildings. While they had convinced the Washington and Mobile County districts to offer a third school system especially for themselves, it remained inadequate for their needs.

By this time, the community was more educationally deprived than Black people; until desegregation, they were typically barred from white schools and refused to attend Black schools, accept Black teachers, or allow church membership to those who married Black people. Descendants of those who married Black people were ostracized from the community. A few were able to pass and attend white schools, but their low literacy hindered economic advancement. After tribal formation, two chiefs have testified saying the predecessors of the Band were banned from Black schools.

The community was denied a high school education until the 1960s. Instead, many adults attended Bacone College, an Indian school run by the Southern Baptist Convention in Muskogee, Oklahoma. A few also attended a BLA-supported high school on the Mississippi Choctaw Reservation, which was relatively close.

==== Civil rights movement and tribal formation ====
During the era of segregation, many local businesses in Mobile would not hire Native Americans, including the ancestors of the MOWA Band, supposedly because they would have to create a third set of bathrooms for them. The passage of the Civil Rights Act in 1964 superseded earlier Jim Crow laws, allowing many members of the community to find employment in chemical and industrial plants across the southeast.

By 1969, most of them went to desegregated schools, with only Reed Chapel school remaining. According to Historian Mark Edwin Miller, the community's Indian churches continue to play an important role in its members' sense of identity and pride.

When the civil rights movement in the 1960s saw an increase in Native American political consciousness, the community was able to organize politically. From the 1970s, members of the community began openly identifying as Native American on censuses, and in 1980, they formally organized as the MOWA Band of Choctaw Indians. In 1984, the group played a central role in the formation of the Alabama Indian Affairs Commission. Since 2000, the Census Bureau has referred to members of the band under the category "American Indian and Alaska Native", subcategory "Choctaw", as using the assigned code C12, for the label "Mowa Band of Choctaw".

== Historical analysis and oral traditions ==
Miller notes that the MOWA Band represents a long-standing community with an established identity as a Native American people, but that its exact tribal heritage is contested. Vine Deloria Jr., MOWA Band advocate and noted supporter of unrecognized tribes in the Southeastern United States, described their historical profile as "typical" of southeastern Native Americans, with documentation connecting them to Choctaw villages before Indian removal. Like other tribes in the region, research into the origins of the MOWA Band has historically been complicated by ambiguous terminology, the racial problems of the American South, and orders from the U.S. government not to count Native Americans in censuses during the early 19th century. Hudson described the policy of disregarding Native groups or lumping them in with others as a "pencil genocide".

Miller stated the MOWA Band's case "reveals the true complexities behind tribal recognition decisions and debates about Indian authenticity", noting that although the tribe's members have oral traditions of "Choctaw, Cherokee, and Creek descent", their triracial heritage was not seen as justification for federal recognition by nearby tribes. Miller also stated that the Bureau of Indian Affairs views ambiguities in other categories as less important for federal recognition if documented tribal ancestry exists, which he stated the BIA and the Band could not locate. Former Assistant Secretary for Indian Affairs Kevin Gover, who handled their petition, has expressed support for them having a chance to re-petition under a revised process.

By 1870, the census enumerated only ninety-eight Native Americans in Alabama. Forty-three were in the vicinity of the modern Poarch Creeks, and none were recorded in the counties of Mobile and Washington. Terms historically used for the three families most strongly associated with the tribe, since at least the middle of the 19th century, such as "mulatto", "free persons of color", and "Black", and sometimes white, were used to describe Black, Native American, and mixed-race people in the area. They had free Black ancestry, and thus were not considered members of the enslaved Black community, but were not considered members of the white community either. Scholars suggest they sometimes affirmed, and were incentivized, to maintain separate identities, as Natives or whites, by practicing segregation from their white and Black neighbors.

Following a high-profile criminal investigation in 1924, in which a nonliterate Native American shot the deputy sheriff of Mobile County, numerous reports circulated about the community. According to Matte, little research was actually done at this time, and each report largely echoed the reports of previous authors. Miller states the reports, however, bear more systematic analysis. He noted they documented little if any evidence of a clear Choctaw identity up to 1929, and that people alive during the time of the reports would have intimately known the Band's progenitors.

=== Kinship groups ===
Areas of historic "Cajan" settlement in Alabama, 1950

The MOWA Band of Choctaw Indians descend from several major kinship groups: the Weavers, Byrds, Rivers, Reeds, and Chastangs. Matte suggested the ancestors of the Band may have also taken the surnames of families that owned the land they squatted on, similar to African-Americans.

==== Weavers and Byrds ====
Anna, Dave and Jim Weaver arrived in Alabama with Lemuel Byrd, Anna's husband, where Matte stated they joined a refugee Choctaw community. Their younger sister Edy had married Joel Rivers. Dave Weaver later married Cecile Weatherford, mother of Jerome Chastang. Matte states he and Cecile moved to an area later known as The Level, which he founded with Byrd and others.

Byrd was born in North Carolina, and served during the Seminole Wars from Putnam County, where he said he had fought Native Americans. Undocumented oral tradition states that Byrd had served in a Cherokee regiment, under General Edmund P. Gaines; his descendants did not apply via him to the Guion Miller Rolls.

Anna and Lemuel's eldest son, Bill T. Byrd, married Betsy Gibson. According to oral tradition, Gibson descended from the Choctaw Chief Elitubbee, though she was documented to have been born in Georgia to parents from Virginia and North Carolina, whereas Elitubbee had his documented children in Mississippi.

According to oral histories, Jim Weaver was exiled from Washington County for killing his nephew. After fleeing, he and his wife Marguerite settled in High Hill with a band of Choctaw led by Piamingo Hometah, in an area known as Caretta, which Matte suggested could have been a reference to Coweta. Wilford "Longhair" Weaver and Galas Weaver became prominent leaders of the Band.

==== Chastangs ====
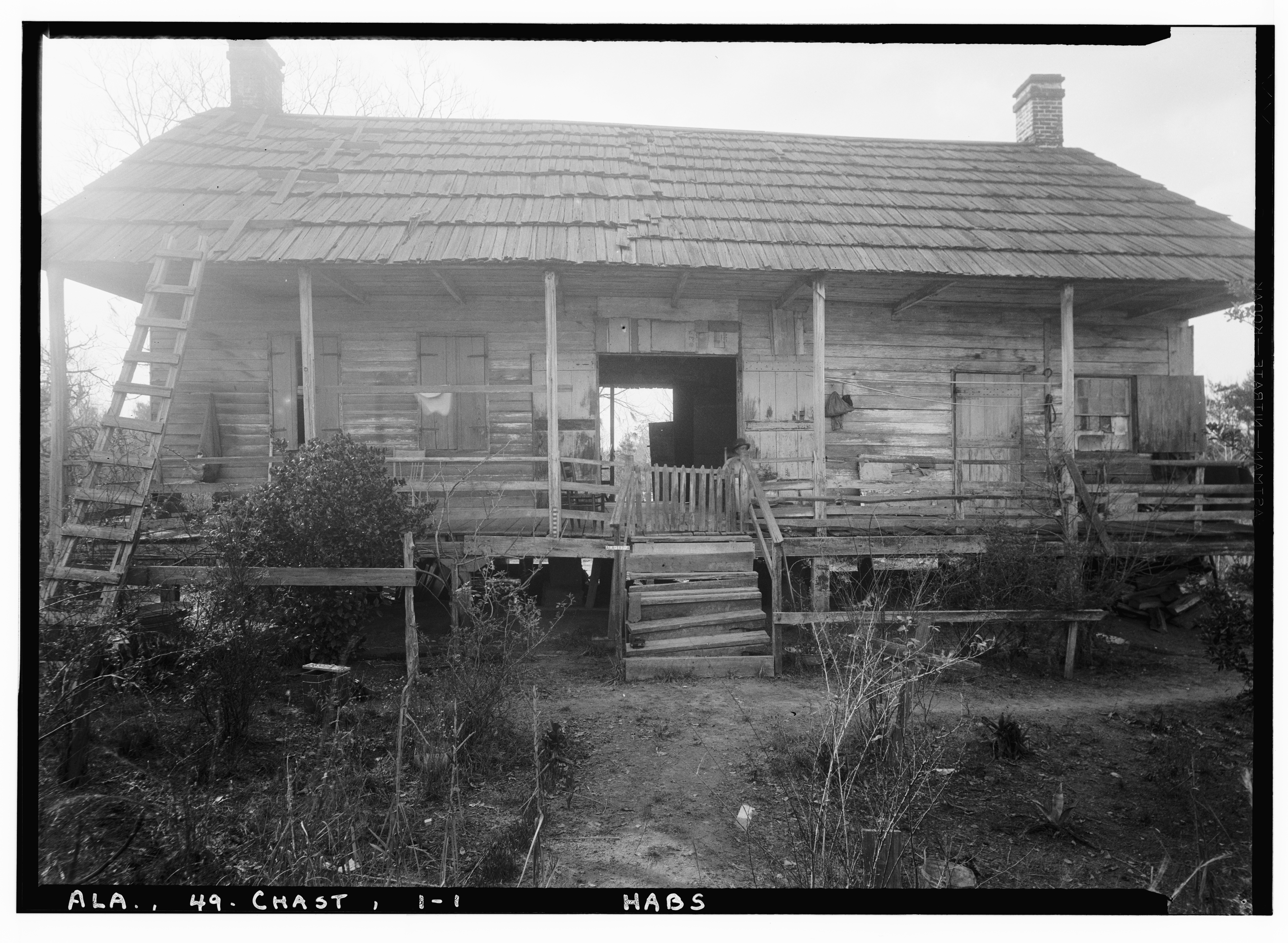
House of Zeno Chastang, son of Jean and Louison.

Dr. John Chastang, who was French Catholic, lived on Twenty-seven-mile Bluff, later known as Chastang's Bluff. There, a local Creole community emerged from his children with his wife Louison, a free Black woman, described in the local quarterly as a Black Indian. Matte suggests the area was also occupied at that time by Choctaw exiles and refugees from the Creek War.

John and Louison's son Edward Chastang later married Cecile Weatherford. The Chastangs of the MOWA Band trace their descent to Edward and Cecile's son, Jerome Chastang.

==== Reeds ====
By 1818, the Reed family had settled near Tibbie, Alabama. Local folk history and official documents suggested various origins for Daniel Reed, including that he was "Portuguese", mixed-race from the West Indies, or a free Black person. He married a Mississippi-born woman named Rose, recorded as a former slave and a mulatto, whom he emancipated from her white master in 1818. The sons of the Reed family married the daughters of Jim and Dave Weaver.

The Band's oral tradition says that Rose was the daughter of Young Gaines, who worked as an interpreter for the Choctaw Trading House at Fort St. Stephens as a settler married to a Native woman. According to a posthumous news story, Gaines had married a Choctaw chieftain's daughter and buried several caches of Choctaw gold. This claim was advanced by the Band during their application for federal recognition, but was rejected at the time by the BIA, due to lack of documentation, census records, Rose's enslavement and emancipation, and the dates of Young Gaines' time in Alabama and Mississippi.

== State recognition ==
In 1979, the State of Alabama formally acknowledged the MOWA Band of Mobile and Washington County as a state-recognized tribe, through legislation introduced by State Representative J. E. Turner. Band members Galas Weaver and Framon Weaver became active leaders in Native American affairs in the state of Alabama. Galas Weaver was instrumental to the formation of the Alabama Indian Affairs Commission, created by the 1984 Davis-Strong Act.

=== Petition for federal recognition ===
The MOWA Band of Choctaw Indians sent a letter of intent for federal recognition in 1983. They completed their petition for federal acknowledgment in 1988. Meanwhile, in 1994, legislation to recognize the MOWA Band passed in the Senate, but failed to pass in the House.

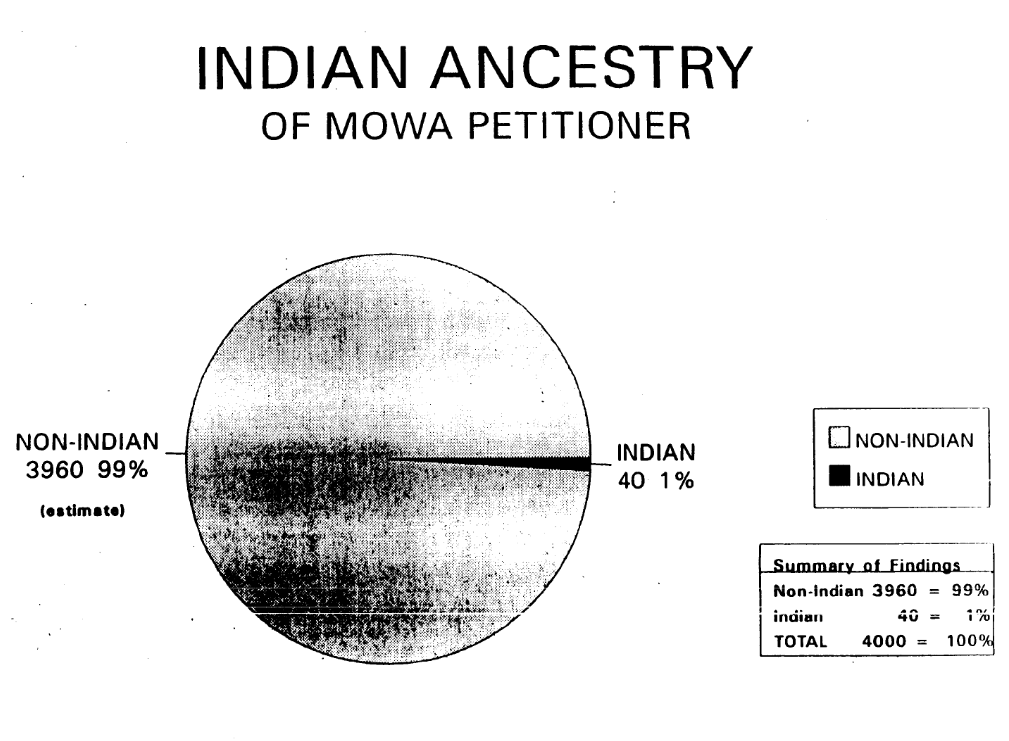
Diagram from Final Determination, depicting the forty Band members with documented Native ancestry. Fifteen descended from Alexander Brashears, and twenty-five descended from the Laurendine-Williams family of Mississippi Choctaw, all of whom married into the group after the Civil War.

Kevin Gover, then Assistant Secretary for Indian Affairs, and the US Department of the Interior denied their petition in 1997 and again in 1999. The final determination stated that "the Alabama group did not descend from the historical Choctaw tribe or from any one of the other five tribes it claimed." It went on to state:

The Final Determination noted that the petitioning group is derived from two core families that were resident in southwestern Alabama by the end of the first third of the nineteenth century. All persons on the petitioner's membership (3,960) roll descend from these two families. About one percent of the members have documented Indian heritage but it derives from an ancestor whose grandchildren married into the petitioning group after 1880, and from another individual who married into the petitioning group in 1904. This insignificant Indian ancestry for a few individual members does not satisfy the criterion that the group as a whole descends from a historical tribe. The MOWA ancestors, most of whom were well documented, were not identified as American Indians or descendants of any particular tribe in the records made in their own life times.

The MOWA Band of Choctaw requested a reconsideration of the Final Determination in 1998, and the US Department of the Interior reaffirmed its declining of the MOWA petition in 1999, stating, "The Final Determination concluded that there was no evidence that established Choctaw or other Indian ancestry of 99 percent of the MOWA membership. Rather, the evidence tended to disprove Indian ancestry."

In the aftermath of the BAR report, tribes such as the Poarch Band of Creek Indians, Eastern Band of Cherokee Indians, Cherokee Nation, and Mississippi Choctaw adopted stances opposing the Band. Some took measures against them, with the Mississippi Choctaw and Poarch Band funding their own reports, and the Cherokee Nation naming them on a list of tribes they considered fraudulent.

As of 2022, US Senator Richard C. Shelby (R-AL) introduced S.3443 - MOWA Band of Choctaw Indians Recognition Act to extend federal recognition to the MOWA Choctaw. The bill was referred to the Senate Committee on Indian Affairs. On March 23, 2022, the committee heard testimony from Chief Lebaron Byrd for federal recognition and the Ute Indian Tribe of the Uintah and Ouray Reservation against recognition. After the hearing, the United Indian Nations of Oklahoma, an organization representing 141 federally recognized tribes, published its opposition to the legislation, saying it set "dangerous precedence" for providing recognition through methods other than the BIA approvals process.

== Organization ==
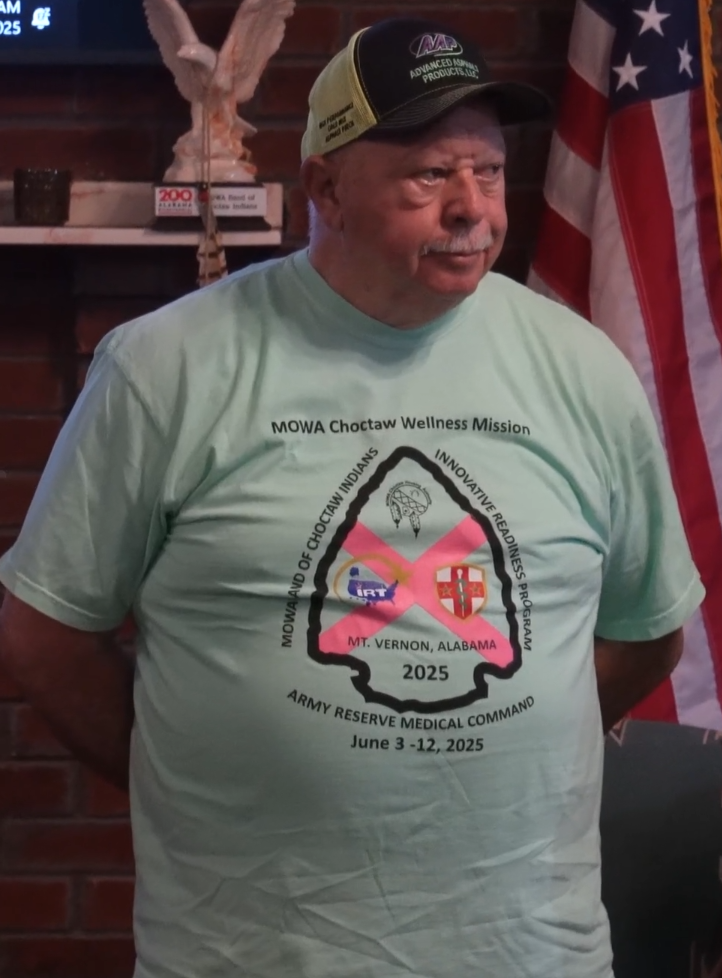
Lebaron Byrd, CEO of the MOWA Band of Choctaw Indian Commission

Under the leadership of Framon Weaver in 1980, the MOWA Band formally organized as a nonprofit organization in Alabama, the MOWA Band of Choctaw Indian Commission.

As of 2022, the commission's administration includes:

- CEO: Lebaron Byrd
- Treasurer: John Byrd
- Chairman: Edward Orso
- Vice Chairman: Kesler Weaver

The commission received grants from organizations such as the Gulf Coast Resource Conservation and Development Area, Ala-Tom RC&D Council, Alabama Business Charitable Trust Fund, and others.

=== Reservation ===
Location of the MOWA Reservation

The MOWA Band is a rare state-recognized tribe with a reservation. The MOWA Choctaw Indian Reservation is a few miles west of US 43. It is 160 acres in size. It includes a health clinic, a museum, recreation facilities, tribal businesses, a tribal center, and several housing complexes, the largest of which is named after Jacqueline Anderson Matte.

=== Culture and events ===
The MOWA Choctaw Cultural Center in Mount Vernon is subordinate to the MOWA Band of Choctaw Indian Commission. It was formed in 2003 as an A90: Arts Service Organization. Lebaron Byrd is its president.

The Band hosts an annual powwow each year.

== Health concerns ==
Members of the MOWA Band of Choctaw Indians have a high frequency of Marinesco–Sjögren syndrome, a rare autosomal recessive disorder which can lead to intellectual disability, muscle weakness, and balance and coordination problems. They are the only known population in the United States to suffer from the rare disease.

== Bibliography ==
- Hudson, Angela Pulley (2021). "Removals and Remainders: Apaches and Choctaws in the Jim Crow South". The Journal of the Civil War Era. 11 (1). The University of North Carolina Press: 80–102. doi:10.1353/cwe.2021.0005 – via Project Muse.
- Matte, Jacqueline Anderson (2006). "Extinction by Reclassification: The MOWA Choctaws of South Alabama and Their Struggle for Federal Recognition". Alabama Review. 59 (3): 163–204.
- Miller, Mark Edwin (2013). Claiming Tribal Identity: The Five Tribes and the Politics of Federal Acknowledgment. Norman: University of Oklahoma Press. ISBN 978-0806143781.
- Price, Edward Thomas (January 1950). Mixed Blood Populations of Eastern United States as to origins, localizations, and persistence. Oakland, CA: University of California.
- Summary under the Criteria and Evidence for Proposed Finding against Federal Acknowledgment of the MOWA Band of Choctaw (PDF) (Report). Washington, D.C.: United States Department of the Interior. 15 December 1994.
