= Meherrin Indian Tribe =

State-recognized tribe in North Carolina, United States

- Official seal of the Meherrin Indian Tribe
- Named after: Meherrin people
- Formation: 1976, incorporated February 15, 1977
- Founded at: Winton, North Carolina
- Type: state-recognized tribe, nonprofit organization
- Tax ID no.: Foundation: EIN 56-1394419
- Location: Ahoskie, North Carolina, United States
- Members: 900 (2022)
- Acting Chief: Jonathan Cadill
- Revenue: $85,454 (2021)
- Expenses: $49,050 (2021)
- Staff: 0
- Website: meherrinnation.org

The Meherrin Indian Tribe is a state-recognized tribe and nonprofit organization in North Carolina. Its members identify as descendants of the Meherrin people. This group is not federally recognized as a Native American tribe.

The Meherrin Indian Tribe identify with the autonym Kauwets'a:ka, which translates to "People of the Water."

== Organization ==
The Meherrin Indian Tribe was founded in 1976 and incorporated a 501(c)(3) nonprofit organization on February 15, 1977. George E. Pierce of Winton, North Carolina, is the registered agent.

The officers as of 2021 were:

- Acting Chief: Jonathan Caudill
- Secretary: Dorthy McAuly
- Treasurer: Tomika Brown
- Counncilman: Jerome James.

They have more than 900 members.

== History ==
The Meherrin Indian Tribe descends from free Black families who lived in North Carolina in 1830. The tribe claims Sallie M. Lewis as their key ancestor, and a portion of the membership has documented descent from her. She was born to Jacob Smith in Hertford County, North Carolina. (Note: Other members of the tribe claim ancestry through her sister, Eliza Ann Keene. She was born in 1837.) In 1862 she married Edward Weaver, who died of yellow fever while serving in the 14th U.S. Colored Heavy Artillery in 1864. She remarried to Elvey Lewis in 1866, who served with Weaver in the same company of the 14th. She died in 1904 after giving birth to 11 children. (Note: She was previously the head of her household in 1900, when she and her family were identified as Black.)

=== Organizational history ===
In 1976, descendants of Sallie M. Lewis were stated to have met at Pleasant Plains Baptist church, and elected her grandson Reverend Ruben Lewis as their leader. They were recorded to have met at his house in 1977, to discuss reorganization as a tribe. The first membership list of the Meherrin Indian Tribe was created in 1979. During this time, 77 out of 316 members of the tribe identified as Cherokee, rather than Meherrin or other tribes. In 1995, a member alleged it was letting in individuals who were not descendants of Sally M. Lewis.

In 1997, a subset of the tribe claimed Sallie M. Lewis was Susquehanna, and that the historic Meherrin were of Susquehanna origins. (Note: The historic Meherrin were present in North Carolina before the migration of Susquehannock into the state.) In 1998, members of the tribe submitted a letter of intent to the Department of the Interior stating that they were of Cherokee ancestry, and requesting to be recognized as a Cherokee tribe.

The Meherrin Indian Tribe consisted of two factions after January 2008, when the tribe voted to remove its leader, along with six members. The reason stated was their involvement in the removal of members from the tribe. In 2011, the two factions were directed by a judge to open discussions on reconciliation. They did not reach an agreement.

=== Identity ===
In the 1990s, the members claimed descent from Sallie M. Smith Lewis (ca. 1844–1904), who they described as "the last full-blooded Meherrin Indian." In 2011, they identified as descendants of Meherrin people who they said lived on Potecasi Creek in North Carolina. The historical Meherrin people were last described as living in North Carolina in 1763. The proposed finding by the Bureau of Indian Affairs Office of Acknowledgment found that "evidence does not demonstrate that Sallie M. (Smith) Lewis or the historical landowners allegedly near Potecasi Creek were Indian, Meherrin Indian, or members of a Meherrin Indian or other Indian tribe." They also noted no relatives of Lewis were ever identified as Indian or Meherrin in contemporary documentation.

== State recognition ==
The State of North Carolina designated the Meherrin Indian Tribe as a state-recognized tribe in 1986.

== Petition for federal recognition ==
In 1995, the Meherrin Indian Tribe filed a petition with the Bureau of Indian Affairs for federal acknowledgment of existence as an Indian tribe. The proposed finding by the Office of Federal Acknowledgment (OFA) declined their petition and ruled that "The petitioner has not documented, nor has the OFA identified a historical Indian tribe, or tribes that combined, from which its members descend."

== Activity ==
The Meherrin Indian Tribe hosts an annual powwow held on their dance grounds between Ahoskie and Murfreesboro. They also maintain a garden.

The Z. Smith Reynolds Foundation and Franklin P. and Arthur W. Perdue Foundation have given grants to the Meherrin Indian Tribe.
