= Tennessee Commission of Indian Affairs =

The Tennessee Commission of Indian Affairs (1984-2001, 2004-2010) was a Tennessee state agency that ceased to function after June 30, 2010, the expiration of the legal authority for its existence, Tennessee Code Annotated (T.C.A.) 4-34-102. The first bill to create the Commission (HB 959/SB 474) was introduced and eventually signed into law by Governor Lamar Alexander in 1983. According to the 1980 Census, there were 5,103 Native American residents in Tennessee.
