= Coharie Intra-tribal Council, Inc. =

State-recognized tribe in North Carolina, US

- Official seal of the Coharie Intra-tribal Council, Inc.
- Named after: Great Coharie Creek, Little Coharie Creek
- Formation: 1911, 1978
- Type: state-recognized tribe, nonprofit organization
- Tax ID no.: EIN 56-1187928
- Purpose: S30. Economic Development
- Location: Clinton, North Carolina, United States
- Members: 2,700
- Official language: English
- Tribal Administrator: Greg Jacobs
- Chairperson: Phillip Strickland
- Chief: Ammie Gordon "Gordie"
- Revenue: $835,656 (2019)
- Expenses: $743,463 (2019)
- Website: coharietribe.org
- Formerly called: Croatan Indians of Samson County, Coharie Tribe of North Carolina, Coharie Indian People, Inc.

The Coharie Intra-tribal Council, Inc., is a state-recognized tribe in North Carolina. The headquarters are in Clinton, North Carolina.

Formerly known as the Coharie Indian People, Inc., and the Coharie Tribe of North Carolina, the group's 2,700 members primarily live in Sampson and Harnett counties. Their chief is Ammie Gordon "Gordie".

The group identifies as descendants of "certain tribes of Indians originally inhabiting the coastal regions of North Carolina." In 1910, residents of Herrings Township along the Coharie creeks identified as being of Croatan descent.

== History ==
The Coharie descend from free Black families who lived in North Carolina in 1830. Scholar Renate Bartl labels them as one of the triracial groups present in the state, who claim Native American identity from local groups, even those extinct or deported. Genealogist Paul Heinegg claims the group is of invented origins.

== Nonprofit organization ==
In 1978, Coharie Intra Tribal Inc. formed as 501(c)(3) nonprofit organization based in Clinton, North Carolina, and Freddie Carter serves as the organization's principal officer. Its mission is to "provide housing, economic development, health, social services assistance and maintenance of the tribal roll for the members of the Coharie Tribe." They have four employees.

The organization operates a HUD/NAHASDA housing project with $557,380 in revenue and $550,186 in expenses for 20 unites. Another program removed debris from the Coharie River after a hurricane, and another provided COVID-19 relief to members.

Leadership positions, as of January 2026, included:

- Chairperson: Phillip Strickland
- Tribal Administrator: Greg Jacobs
- Vice Chairperson: Sharon Williams
- Secretary: Magic Gomez
- Council Member: Daniel Robbins
- Council Member: Gnaynelle Ammons Faircloth
- Council Member: Dawn Chumley
- Council Member: Shelby Autry

== Recognition ==
In 1911, North Carolina first recognized the Croatan Indians of Samson County.

The state of North Carolina formalized its recognition process for Native American tribes and created the North Carolina Commission of Indian Affairs (NCCIA) in 1971. North Carolina formally recognized the Coharie Tribe of North Carolina as a state-recognized tribe on July 20, 1971.

The state recognized the site of their historic tribal school with a historical marker in 2024. Built in 1901, the children of the tribe attended the school for decades due to segregation. The tribal headquarters is now located at the site.

Romie G. Simmons sent a letter of intent to petition for federal recognition on behalf of the Coharie Intra-tribal Council, Inc., on March 13, 1981. The organization never followed through with a petition for federal recognition as a Native American tribe.

== Activities ==
The Coharie Indian Cultural Pow Wow takes place in every September every year.

E. Sequoyah Simermeyer, a member of the Coharie Intra-tribal Council and Navajo descendant, served as a Government Affairs Group Associate with the National Congress of American Indians and became a counsel to the assistant secretary in the US Department of the Interior Bureau of Indian Affairs in 2007.

== See also ==
- Dark Water Rising – a Coharie and Lumbee indie/blues band
