= Metrolina Native American Association =

Native American community association in North Carolina

The Metrolina Native American Association (MNAA) is a Native American community association in Mecklenburg County, North Carolina. MNAA is a North Carolina state-recognized Urban Indian Center.

Incorporated in January 1976 by local Native Americans as a non-profit education advocacy group, the MNAA and has grown to encompass child care, employment, and age-based community programs. It is the second oldest Urban Indian Center in North Carolina.

The organization serves over 10,000 Native Americans in Mecklenburg and the surrounding counties. Since its inception in 1976, the organizations hosts an annual powwow and cultural festival.

All MNAA board members serve volunteer three year terms.In 2022, the chairperson of the board of MNAA is Rebecca Jones LaClaire, a member of the Lumbee Tribe in North Carolina.
