= State-recognized tribes in the United States =

State-recognized tribes in the United States are Native American tribes or heritage groups that do not meet the criteria for federally recognized Indian tribes but have been recognized by state government through laws, governor's executive orders, or state commissions legally granted the power to recognize tribes for varying purposes. State recognition does not dictate whether or not they are recognized as Native American tribes by continually existing tribal nations.

Individual states confer "for their various internal state government purposes". State recognition confers few benefits under federal law; it is not the same as federal recognition. Members of a state-recognized tribe are still subject to state law and government, and the tribe does not have sovereign control over its affairs. Some states have provided laws related to state recognition that provide some protection of autonomy for tribes that are not recognized by the federal government. For example, in Connecticut, state law recognizing certain tribes also protects reservations and limited self-government rights for state-recognized tribes.

Non-recognized tribes is a term for "groups that have no federal designation and are not accepted as sovereign entities under U.S. law," which includes state-recognized tribes. Within this category are "federally non-recognized" tribes, which includes tribes that were previously recognized by the federal government or other governments that preceded the U.S., and tribes that no longer meet the criteria for federal recognition. Other groups that identify as being Native American tribes but lack federal or state recognition are listed in the List of organizations that self-identify as Native American tribes.

Some federally recognized tribes, such as the Cherokee Nation and the Delaware Nation, have opposed state recognition, either in the case of individual tribes or as a whole. Journalists Adam Elmahrek and Paul Pringle wrote, "Many Native Americans have long opposed allowing states to recognize tribes, arguing that the federal government should make the decision because states often fail to properly screen groups."

== Demographics and geography ==
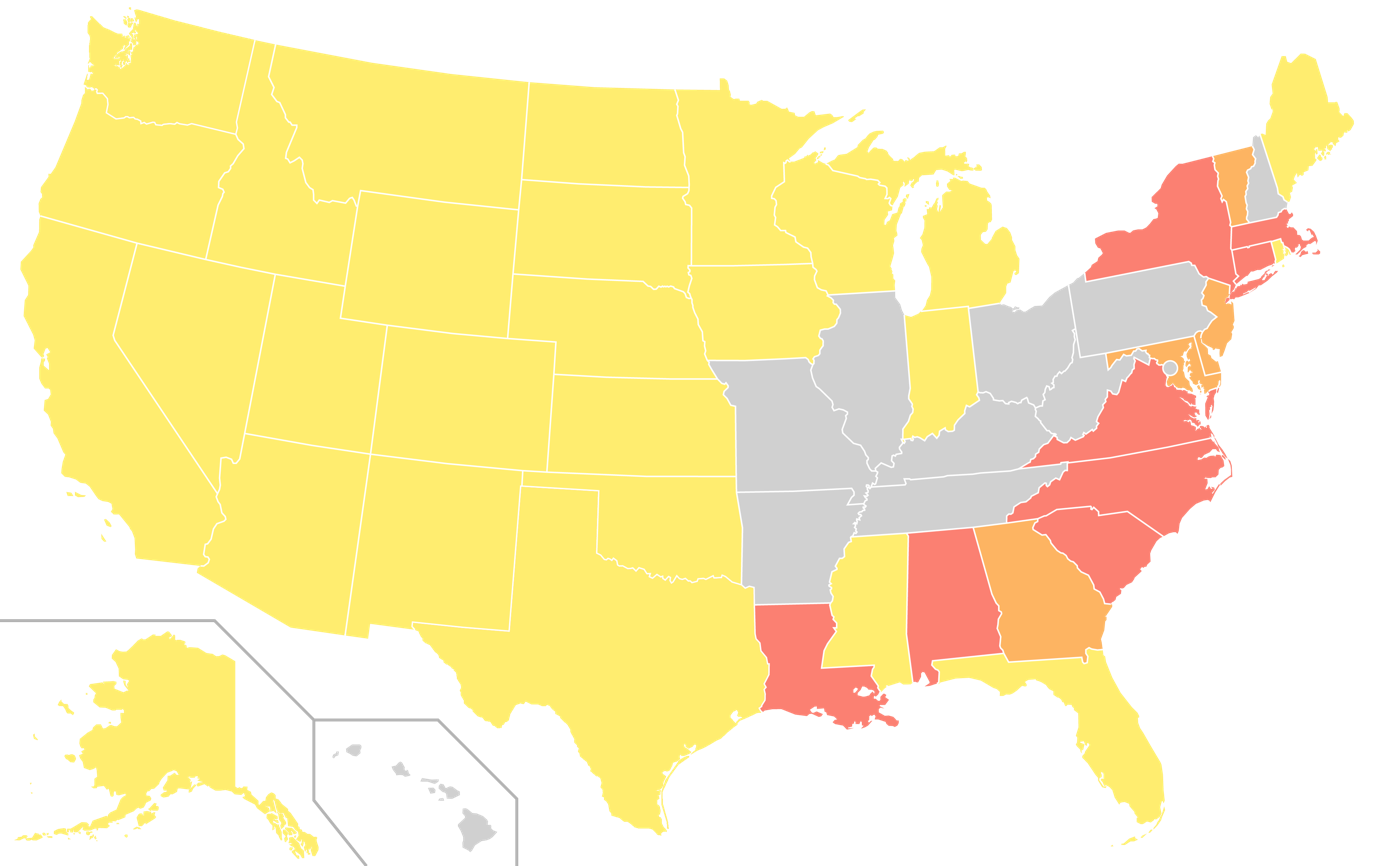
Federally recognized tribes State recognized tribes Both state and federally recognized tribes

Most state-recognized tribes are located in the Eastern United States, including the two largest state-recognized tribes in the US, the Echota Cherokee Tribe of Alabama and the United Houma Nation of Louisiana, each of which has more than ten thousand members.

Sources disagree on how many states have state-recognized tribes. No government agency or nonprofit organization tracks the total of state-recognized tribes in the United States. In late 2007, about 16 states had recognized 62 tribes. According to the National Conference of State Legislatures, only 13 states recognized tribes at the state level in 2022. Likewise in 2022, the Reference Encyclopedia of the American Indian reported that there were 66 state-recognized tribes among 13 states, which includes 8 tribes that are also federally recognised (7 in Virginia and 1 in New York).

As of 2024, the Native Nations Institute of the University of Arizona lists 15 states as having state-recognized tribes. In 2025, journalist Bill Donahue wrote in Boston's City Life that more than 100 organizations are state-recognized as tribes.

== State-recognition processes ==
State recognition can vary in meaning and impact, from granting a tribe legitimacy within the state to simply recognizing its existence as a state might recognize a business. According to Alexa Koenig and Jonathan Stein, state recognition may serve "as a means for states to acknowledge the longstanding existence of tribes within their borders and to establish a government-to-government relationship to coordinate and communicate with tribes".

Processes for state-recognition of tribes include state legislation, executive orders by a state governor, or recognition by state commissions vested with the authority to recognize tribes. Typically, the state legislature or state agencies involved in cultural or Native American affairs make the formal recognition by criteria they establish, often with Native American representatives, and sometimes based on federal criteria. Statutes that clearly identify criteria for recognition or that explicitly recognize certain tribes remove ambiguity from their status.

Many organizations try to assert that various congratulatory resolutions constitute recognition as a Native American tribe by a state; however, "Resolutions are statements of opinions and, unlike bills, do not have the force of law."

== Federal law ==
The U.S. Constitution Article 1, Section 8 states, "The Congress shall have Power to regulate commerce with foreign nations, amongst the several states and with the Indian tribes." The Kansas Native American Affairs Office states, "This clause forms the basis for Congressional lawmaking authority over the tribes, excluding state governmental authority over Tribes, thus establishing the unique tribal-federal government relationship."

The Supreme Court has determined that the United States Constitution gives ultimate authority over matters affecting American Indian tribes to the United States federal government, in Johnson v. McIntosh (1832), Cherokee Nation v. Georgia (1831), and Worcester v. Georgia (1832).

Under US federal law and regulations, an American Indian tribe is a group of Native Americans with self-government authority, and this is the basis for federal recognition. As of 2025, the federal government had recognized 575 tribes, often as a result of treaties setting up reservations in the 19th century.

Four federal agencies have the authority to confer benefits to state-recognized tribes: the Department of Health and Human Services, the Department of Labor, the Department of Education, and the Department of Housing and Urban Development. State-recognized tribes also participate in the programs of the Small Business Administration (SBA), an independent agency of the US federal government, and there is a rebuttable presumption that members of state-recognized tribes are "socially disadvantaged" for the purposes of the SBA's 8(a) Business Development program.

Under the United States Indian Arts and Crafts Act of 1990 (IACA), members of certain state-recognized tribes may exhibit as identified "Native American" or "American Indian" artists. In addition to citizens of federally recognized tribes and tribally designated artisans, IACA says that members of "any Indian group that has been formally recognized as an Indian tribe by a State legislature or by a State commission or similar organization legislatively vested with State tribal recognition authority" can exhibit or sell art as a "Native American" or "American Indian" artist.

The Administration for Native Americans, a program office within the Department of Health and Human Services, may confer benefits to state-recognized tribes under the Native American Programs Act (NAPA). Members of state-recognized tribes are unable to access support from the Indian Health Service, and may have additional healthcare needs as a result.

The Native American Graves Protection and Repatriation Act (NAGPRA) does not require the federal government or museums to consult with state-recognized tribes. State-recognized tribes may request the repatriation of cultural items or human remains only in cooperation with federally recognized tribes. Other federal Indian legislation does not apply to state-recognized tribes. For example, Indian Preference in hiring and the Indian Child Welfare Act of 1978 do not apply to these organizations.

== Attitudes ==
=== Opposition ===
Some federally-recognized tribes object to state recognition. Journalists Adam Elmahrek and Paul Pringle wrote, "Many Native Americans have long opposed allowing states to recognize tribes, arguing that the federal government should make the decision because states often fail to properly screen groups." The Cherokee Nation opposes state-recognized tribes, as well as Cherokee heritage groups and others with no documented descent who claim Cherokee identity.

The Inter-Tribal Council of the Five Civilized Tribes (Cherokee Nation, Chickasaw Nation, Choctaw Nation, Muscogee Nation, and Seminole Nation of Oklahoma) issued a resolution in 2022 denouncing state recognition of groups as tribes or federal recognition by means other than the Office of Federal Acknowledgment (OFA). The resolution states that "fraudulent groups that appropriate our culture...often seek state recognition and other means to bolster their legitimacy and bypass" OFA.

The federally recognized Delaware Nation regards all state-recognized Lenape tribes and Lenape heritage groups as fraudulent organizations, as they have stated that they "do not acknowledge or work with any non-federally recognized groups that claim Lenape identity or nationhood, which includes “state recognized” groups as we do not agree with state recognition."

The federally recognized Delaware Tribe of Indians has issued a resolution which "denounces fabricated Delaware groups and commits to exposing and assisting state and federal authorities in eradicating any group which attempts or claims to operate as a government of the Delaware people". The resolution refers to Lenape heritage groups and state-recognized tribes in Delaware, New Jersey, New York and Pennsylvania as CPAINs (Corporations Posing As Indigenous Nations).

The federally recognized Narragansett Indian Tribe in Rhode Island is opposed to state recognition in general and opposes state recognition for the Seaconke Wampanoag Tribe in particular.

The federally recognized Odanak First Nation in Canada opposes state recognition of tribes in New Hampshire and Vermont. Odanak regards the four state-recognized tribes in Vermont as illegitimate organizations.

=== Support ===
August Joseph Darbonne suggests that state-recognized tribes are underrepresented in research and have been "accused of claiming fraudulent Native American identity to gain access to state benefits and programs". He also says that the "limited representation of state-recognized tribes contributes to negative stereotypes against Native Americans". In an address to the Alliance for Colonial Era Tribes, Professor Patty Ferguson Bohnee and Blair Tarman argued that tribal sovereignty should not be tied to federal recognition, since this is based on the needs of colonial rather than tribal governments, and undermines the inherent rights of all tribes.

The federally recognized Mashpee Wampanoag Tribe considers the state-recognized Herring Pond Wampanoag Tribe to be a "sister tribe". After the Commonwealth of Massachusetts granted state recognition to the Herring Pond Wampanoag Tribe in 2024, the Mashpee Wampanoag Tribe issued a media release stating they considered it "a monumental day for the entire Wampanoag Nation".

== List of state-recognized tribes ==
The following is a list of tribes recognized by various states but not by the U.S. Bureau of Indian Affairs. Tribes originally recognized by states that have since gained federal recognition have been deleted from the list below. The list does include state-recognized tribes that have petitioned for federal recognition.

=== Alabama ===
By the Davis-Strong Act of 1984, the state established the Alabama Indian Affairs Commission to acknowledge and represent Native American citizens in the state. At that time, it recognized seven tribes that did not have federal recognition. The commission members, representatives of the tribes, have created rules for tribal recognition, which were last updated in 2003, under which three more tribes have been recognized.

- Cher-O-Creek Intra Tribal Indians.
- Cherokee Tribe of Northeast Alabama (formerly Cherokees of Jackson County, Alabama). Letter of Intent to Petition 09/23/1981; certified letter returned "not known" 11/19/1997.
- Cherokees of Southeast Alabama. Letter of Intent to Petition 05/27/1988; certified letter returned marked "deceased" 11/5/1997.
- Echota Cherokee Tribe of Alabama.
- Ma-Chis Lower Creek Indian Tribe of Alabama. Letter of Intent to Petition 06/27/1983. Declined to Acknowledge 08/18/1988 52 FR 34319, Denied federal recognition.
- MOWA Band of Choctaw Indians. Letter of Intent to Petition 05/27/1983. Final Determination to Decline to Acknowledge published 12/24/1997 62FR247:67398-67400; petitioner requested reconsideration from BIA 3/23/1998, denied federal recognition; decision effective 11/26/1999.
- Piqua Shawnee Tribe.
- Star Clan of Muscogee Creeks (formerly Lower Creek Muscogee Tribe East, Star Clan, Southeastern Mvskoke Nation, and Yufala Star Clan of Lower Muscogee Creeks).
- United Cherokee Ani-Yun-Wiya Nation (formerly United Cherokee Intertribal). Letter of Intent to Petition 11/08/2001.

=== Connecticut ===
- Eastern Pequot Tribal Nation.
  - Eastern Pequot Indians of Connecticut. Letter of Intent to Petition 06/28/1978; Reconsidered final determination not to acknowledge became final and effective 10/14/2005 70 FR 60099.
  - Paucatuck Eastern Pequot Indians of Connecticut. Letter of Intent to Petition 06/20/1989. Reconsidered final determination not to acknowledge became final and effective 10/14/2005 70 FR 60099.
- Golden Hill Paugussett. Final Determination Against Federal Acknowledgement of the Golden Hill Paugussett Tribe (2004)
- Schaghticoke Tribal Nation. Letter of Intent to Petition 9/27/2001. Letter of Intent to Petition 12/14/1981; Declined to acknowledge in 2002; Reconsidered final determination not to acknowledge became final and effective 10/14/2005 70 FR 60101. Also known as the Schaghticoke Indian Tribe.

=== Delaware ===
- Lenape Indian Tribe of Delaware.
- Nanticoke Indian Association, Inc. Letter of Intent to Petition 08/08/1978; requested petition be placed on hold 3/25/1989 of limited applicability.

=== Georgia ===
Georgia established a liaison, the Georgia Council on American Indian Concerns, in 2001, under the Georgia Department of Natural Resources, State Parks and Historic Sites Division. In 2007, the state legislature formally recognized the following as American Indian tribes of Georgia:

- Cherokee of Georgia Tribal Council.
- Georgia Tribe of Eastern Cherokees. (I). Letter of Intent to Petition 01/09/1979; last submission February 2002; ready for Acknowledge review. Unrecognized organizations with the same name as Georgia Tribe of Eastern Cherokees, Inc. (II) and (III) exist.
- Lower Muskogee Creek Tribe. Letter of Intent to Petition 02/02/1972; Declined to Acknowledge 12/21/1981 (46 FR 51652). Denied federal recognition. Also known as Lower Muskogee Creek Tribe East of the Mississippi, Inc.

=== Illinois ===
Illinois has no state-recognized tribes.

=== Kentucky ===
Kentucky has no state-recognized tribes or federally recognized tribes.

=== Louisiana ===
The Louisiana Office of Indian Affairs oversees state–tribal relations. They maintain a list of federally and state-recognized tribes headquartered in Louisiana.

1. Addai Caddo Tribe, also Adai Caddo Indians of Louisiana, Robeline, LA. Recognized by the State of Louisiana in 1993. Letter of Intent to Petition 09/13/1993. Also Adais Caddo Indians, Inc.
2. Bayou Lafourche Band of the Biloxi-Chitimacha Confederation of Muskogees, also Biloxi-Chitimacha Confederation of Muskogee, Denham Springs, LA. Separated from United Houma Nation, Inc. Letter of Intent to Petition 10/24/1995. Recognized by the State of Louisiana in 2005.
3. Choctaw-Apache Community of Ebarb, also the Choctaw-Apache Tribe of Ebarb, Zwolle, LA. Recognized by the State of Louisiana in 1978. Letter of Intent to Petition 07/02/1978.
4. Clifton-Choctaw, also the Clifton Choctaw Tribe of Louisiana, Clinton, LA. Recognized by the State of Louisiana in 1978. Letter of Intent to Petition 03/22/1978. Also known as Clifton Choctaw Reservation Inc.
5. Four Winds Tribe, Louisiana Cherokee Confederacy, also the Four Winds Cherokees, Oakdale, LA. Recognized by the State of Louisiana in 1997.
6. Grand Caillou/Dulac Band of the Biloxi-Chitimacha Confederation of Muskogees, also the Grand Caillou/Dulac Band of Biloxi Chitimacha Choctaw, Chauvin, LA.
7. Isle de Jean Charles Band of the Biloxi-Chitimacha Confederation of Muskogees, also the Jean Charles Choctaw Nation, Montegut, LA
8. Louisiana Choctaw Tribe, as the Louisiana Band of Choctaw, Ferriday, LA
9. Natchitoches Tribe of Louisiana, Campti, LA Recognized by the State of Louisiana in 2017 Regular Session, HR227.
10. Pointe-au-Chien Tribe, also Pointe-au-Chien Indian Tribe, Montegut, LA. Separated from United Houma Nation, Inc. Letter of Intent to Petition 7/22/1996. Recognized by the State of Louisiana in 2004.
11. United Houma Nation. Recognized by the State of Louisiana in 1972. Letter of Intent to Petition 07/10/1979; Proposed Finding 12/22/1994, 59 FR 6618. Denied federal recognition.

=== Maryland ===
On January 9, 2012, for the first time the state-recognized two American Indian tribes under a process developed by the General Assembly; these were both Piscataway groups, historically part of the large Algonquian languages family along the Atlantic Coast. The Governor announced it to the Assembly by executive order.

1. Accohannock Indian Tribe. Governor Larry Hogan formally recognized this group on December 19, 2017, through Executive Order 01.01.2017.31.
2. Piscataway-Conoy Tribe. It includes the following two sub-groups:
  1. Piscataway Conoy Confederacy and Sub-Tribes
  2. Cedarville Band of Piscataway Indians

3. Piscataway Indian Nation and Tayac Territory.

=== Massachusetts ===
The Massachusetts Commission on Indian Affairs was created by a legislative act of the General Court of Massachusetts in 1974, to advise the Commonwealth on how best to establish positive relationships with its Indigenous Tribes. The commission lacks the authority to recognize tribes, as recognition is beyond the scope of the duties of the commission outlined in Executive Order 126 and in the administration of the Massachusetts government. The Massachusetts Commission on Indian Affairs announced in August 2023 that it would be establishing a process for state recognition to ensure protections for Native artisans under the Indian Arts and Crafts Act of 1990.

In 1976, Governor Michael Dukakis issued Executive Order 126, which clarified the responsibilities of the Massachusetts Commission on Indian Affairs and identified three historic and continuous tribes in the Commonwealth: the Wampanoag Tribe of Gay Head, the Mashpee Wampanoag Tribe and the Hassanamisco Nipmuc. The Wampanoag Tribe of Gay Head and the Mashpee Wampanoag Tribe have federal recognition as of 1987 and 2007, respectively.

On November 19, 2024, Governor Maura Healey issued Executive Order No. 637, which recognized the Herring Pond Wampanoag Tribe alongside the Mashpee Wampanoag Tribe, the Wampanoag Tribe of Gay Head, and the Hassanamisco Nipmuc Tribe. The order also recognized Tribal Council of the Herring Pond as its governing body, all in accordance with Dukakis' Executive Order No. 126, for all relevant purposes.

- Hassanamisco Nipmuc. Letter of Intent to Petition 04/22/1980; Declined to acknowledge on 6/25/2004, 69 FR 35667. The Hassanamisco Nipmuc Band petitioned for federal acknowledgment in 1980. After receiving preliminary approval, they were ultimately denied due to its failure to meet criteria for federal acknowledgment.
- Herring Pond Wampanoag Tribe

=== Mississippi ===
The state of Mississippi has offered congratulatory resolutions to unrecognized organizations identifying as Native American descendants, such as the MS HR50 in which the legislators "commend and congratulate" Vancleave Live Oak Choctaw Tribe for recognition; however, no laws outline formal state-recognition for this or any other group by the State of Mississippi.

Mississippi has no office to manage Indian affairs and no state-recognized tribes.

=== New Jersey ===
- Nanticoke Lenni-Lenape Tribal Nation. Letter of Intent to Petition 01/03/1992.
- Ramapough Mountain Indians.
- Powhatan Renape Nation.

=== New York ===
- Unkechaug Nation (Resides on Poospatuck Reservation)

=== North Carolina ===
1. Coharie Intra-tribal Council, Inc. Letter of Intent to Petition 3/13/1981.
2. Haliwa-Saponi Indian Tribe. Letter of Intent to Petition 1/27/1979. Notified of "obvious deficiencies" in federal recognition application
3. Meherrin Nation. State-recognized 1987.
4. Occaneechi Band of the Saponi Nation. Letter of Intent to Petition 01/06/1995.
5. Sappony (formerly known as Indians of Person County, North Carolina).
6. Waccamaw-Siouan Tribe. Letter of Intent to Petition 06/27/1983; determined ineligible to petition (SOL opinion of 10/23/1989). Letter of Intent to Petition 10/16/1992; determined eligible to petition (SOL letter of 6/29/1995). Also known as Waccamaw Siouan Development Association.

=== Ohio ===
Ohio has no office to manage Indian affairs and no state-recognized tribes.

In 1979 and 1980, the Ohio state legislature held hearings about state recognition of the United Remnant Band of the Shawnee Nation of Bellefontaine Ohio. The band filed historical and genealogical documents with the state to support their claim of descent from the historical Shawnee.The Ohio General Assembly held hearings and heard testimony from numerous groups. In 1980, the 113th Ohio General Assembly passed a "Joint Resolution to recognize the Shawnee Nation United Remnant Band", as adopted by the Ohio Senate, 113th General Assembly, Regular Session, Am. Sub. H.J.R. No. 8, 1979–1980. This is a congratulatory resolution, and Ohio attorney general's office spokesperson Leo Jennings said: "The resolution has no force of law in the state Ohio.… It was basically a ceremonial resolution."

=== South Carolina ===
South Carolina recognizes three entities: "state-recognized tribes", "state-recognized groups", and "special interest organizations." As of 2025, South Carolina recognizes ten tribes that are not recognized by the federal government.

- Beaver Creek Indians. Letter of Intent to Petition 01/26/1998. State-recognized tribe in 2006.
- Eastern Cherokee, Southern Iroquois and United Tribes of South Carolina
- Edisto Natchez Kusso Tribe of South Carolina. State-recognized tribe in 2010. Also known as Edisto Natchez-Kusso Indians (Four Holes Indian Organization).
- Pee Dee Indian Nation of Upper South Carolina. Letter of Intent to Petition 12/14/2005. State-recognized tribe in 2005.
- Pee Dee Indian Tribe. Letter of Intent to Petition 01/30/1995. State recognized in 2006. Formerly Pee Dee Indian Tribe of South Carolina (2005). Formerly Pee Dee Indian Association (1978).
- Piedmont American Indian Association, also Piedmont American Indian Association Lower Eastern Cherokee Nation.
- Santee Indian Organization. Letter of Intent to Petition 06/04/1979. State-recognized tribe in 2006. Formerly White Oak Indian Community.
- Sumter Tribe of Cheraw Indians.
- The Waccamaw Indian People.
- The Wassamasaw Tribe of Varnertown Indians.

The South Carolina Commission for Minority Affairs' Native American Affairs Division also has recognized "state-recognized groups" and "special interest organizations" but these are not the same as the state-recognized tribes. In 2018, South Carolina Governor Henry McMaster signed legislation that stops the state from recognizing any additional Native American "groups." As of 2023, South Carolina recognizes three "state-recognized groups" and one "special interest organization." They are: Chaloklowa Chickasaw Indian People; Natchez Tribe of South Carolina; and the Pee Dee Indian Nation of Beaver Creek. The special interest organization is the Pine Hill Indian Community Development Initiative.

=== Texas ===
Texas has no office to manage Indian affairs and, according to several sources, no state-recognized tribes. Legal scholar J. Eric Reed (Choctaw Nation of Oklahoma) wrote in the November 2025 Texas Bar Journal, "Despite a rich history of [I]ndigenous peoples and tribes that still remain as communities of this state, Texas currently has no state-recognized tribes."

Native American journalists Tristan Ahtone (Kiowa) and Graham Lee Brewer (Cherokee Nation) wrote in 2022 that Texas had "no legal mechanism to recognize tribes."

Before the Texas Commission for Indian Affairs was dissolved in 1989, it only worked with the three federally recognized tribes in the state; it did not work any state-recognized tribes. The state has no codified administrative process for petitioning for state recognition of Indian tribes.

Texas has frequently adopted congratulatory resolutions honoring organizations in the state, such as Senate Resolution 989 (2015) honoring the Texas Band of Yaqui Indians and SR 439 (2009) honoring the Lipan Apache Tribe of Texas; however, "resolutions are statements of opinions and, unlike bills, do not have the force of law."

Several sources state that Texas does have state-recognized tribes. The Office of the Governor, Public Safety Office, in the State of Texas "2022–2025 STOP Violence Against Women Act Implementation Plan" describes the Lipan Apache and Yaqui as "state recognized" tribes. In a 2024–2025 Department of the Interior consultation summary on the Safeguard Tribal Objects of Patrimony (STOP) Act, the Bureau of Indian Affairs described the Texas Band of Yaqui Indians as “state‑recognized.” Texas educational and governmental materials similarly refer to the Lipan Apache Tribe of Texas and the Texas Band of Yaqui Indians as “state‑recognized tribes,” and explaining that state‑recognized tribes “have a relationship with state governments, but they do not have sovereignty like federally recognized tribes.”

The National Congress of American Indians list the Tsalagiyi Nvdagi Tribe and the Lipan Apache Tribe of Texas as being state-recognized tribes in Texas.

Several bills have been introduced to create formal state-recognized tribes in Texas; however, these died in committee or chamber. They include:

- 2022: Texas Senate Bill 231 to recognize Lipan Apache Tribe of Texas
- 2023: Texas SB231 to recognize the Lipan Apache Tribe of Texas
- 2023: Texas SB1479 and House Bill 2005 to recognize the Tap Pilam Coahuiltecan Nation
- 2025: Texas SB1634, SB4988, and HB4732 to recognize the Lipan Band of Apache. Texas HB4732 passed in the house in May 2025 and was engrossed and sent to the senate, where it died in chamber.

=== Vermont ===
As of May 3, 2006, Vermont law 1 V.S.A §§ 851–853 recognizes Abenakis as Native American Indians, not the tribes or bands. However, on April 22, 2011, Vermont Governor Peter Shumlin signed legislative bills officially recognizing two Abenaki Bands. The four Abenaki state-recognized tribes are also known as the "Abenaki Alliance".

- Elnu Abenaki Tribe. Recognition signed into statute April 22, 2011.
- Nulhegan Band of the Coosuk Abenaki Nation. Recognition signed into statute April 22, 2011.

On May 7, 2012, Governor Shumlim signed legislative bills officially recognizing two more Abenaki Bands:

- Koasek Abenaki Tribe. Also known as Traditional Koasek Abenaki Nation of the Koas.
- Missiquoi Abenaki Tribe. Also known as Missisquoi St Francis Sokoki Abenaki Nations. Petitioned for federal recognition, denied in 2007.

=== Virginia ===
Virginia has an office to manage Indian affairs: the Virginia Council on Indians. It is composed of 13 members: eight from Virginia tribes officially recognized by the Commonwealth, two members at-large from Indian population in Virginia, one from House of Delegates, one from Senate, and one from Commonwealth at-large.

Virginia has the following state-recognized tribes:

- Cheroenhaka (Nottoway) Indian Tribe. Letter of Intent to Petition 12/30/2002. Receipt of Petition 12/30/2002. State-recognized 2010; in Courtland, Southampton County. Letter of intent to file for federal recognition 2017. Currently a bill is being sponsored.
- Mattaponi Indian Nation (a.k.a. Mattaponi Indian Reservation). Letter of Intent to Petition 04/04/1995. State-recognized 1983; in Banks of the Mattaponi River, King William County. The Mattaponi and Pamunkey have reservations based in colonial-era treaties ratified by the Commonwealth in 1658. Pamunkey Tribe's attorney told Congress in 1991 that the tribes state reservation originated in a treaty with the crown in the 17th century and has been occupied by Pamunkey since that time under strict requirements and following the treaty obligation to provide to the Crown a deer every year, and they've done that (replacing Crown with Governor of Commonwealth since Virginia became a Commonwealth).
- Nottoway Indian Tribe of Virginia. Recognized 2010; in Capron, Southampton County.
- Patawomeck Indian Tribe of Virginia. Recognized 2010; in Stafford County.

=== Washington ===
Washington has not formally recognized any tribes by statute.

== See also ==
United States

- Federally recognized tribes (Lower 48 states)
- Federally recognized tribes in Alaska
- List of organizations that self-identify as Native American tribes, not recognized by state or federal governments
- Native Americans in the United States
- List of federally recognized tribes by state
- List of Indian reservations in the United States
- List of historical Indian reservations in the United States
- Outline of United States federal Indian law and policy
- National Park Service Native American Heritage Sites

Canada

- List of Indian reserves in Canada
- List of First Nations governments
- List of First Nations peoples
- List of organizations that self-identify as FNIM governments

Related

- Diplomatic recognition
  - List of states with limited recognition
  - List of historical unrecognized states and dependencies
- Sovereignty
  - Tribal sovereignty

== External sources ==
- Miller, Mark Edwin. Forgotten Tribes: Unrecognized Indians and the Federal Acknowledgment Process. Lincoln: University of Nebraska Press, 2004. Discusses the state recognition process, the experiences of several state-recognized tribes (the United Houma Nation of Louisiana, and the Tigua/Pueblo of Ysleta Del Sur and Alabama-Coushatta Tribes of Texas- the latter two are federally recognized), and the problems of non-federally acknowledged indigenous communities.
- Bates, Denise. The Other Movement: Indian Rights and Civil Rights in the Deep South. Tuscaloosa: University of Alabama Press, 2011. Details state recognition and the functioning of state Indian commissions in Alabama and Louisiana.
- Federalism and the State Recognition of Native American Tribes: A survey of State-Recognized Tribes and State Recognition Processes Across the United States
- "BIA list of petitioners for recognition by state as of 22 September 2008
- BIA status summary of petitions for recognition as of 15 February 2007"
- Testimony of Leon Jones, Principal Chief of the Eastern Band of Cherokee Indians, and Dan McCoy, Tribal Council Chairman, on the Indian Federal Recognition Administrative Procedures Act of 1999
- Joint resolution of the Cherokee Nation and the Eastern Band of Cherokee Indians opposing fabricated Cherokee "tribes" and "Indians" (acknowledges the United Keetoowah Band of Cherokee Indians)
- U.S. GAO - Indian Issues: Federal Funding for Non-Federally Recognized Tribes Published April 12, 2012
