= Georgia Tribe of Eastern Cherokee =

State-recognized tribe and non-profit organization in Georgia

- Abbreviation: GTEC
- Named after: Cherokee people, Georgia (U.S. state)
- Formation: 2021 (foundation)
- Type: state-recognized tribe and 501(c)(3) nonprofit organization
- Tax ID no.: EIN: 87-1855423
- Legal status: Active
- Purpose: Mutual/Membership Benefit Organizations, Other / Fund Raising and/or Fund Distribution
- Headquarters: Dahlonega, Georgia
- Location: United States
- Official language: English
- Council Chair: Rhonda Odom Bennett
- Website: georgiatribeeasterncherokee.com

The Georgia Tribe of Eastern Cherokee (GTEC) is a state-recognized tribe in the U.S. state of Georgia. This organization is not federally recognized as a Native American tribe, and Georgia has no federally recognized tribes. They are based in Dahlonega, Georgia.

The state-recognized Georgia Tribe of Eastern Cherokee based in Dahlonega should not be confused with the nonprofit organization and unrecognized organization also named the Georgia Tribe of Eastern Cherokee that is based in Cumming or the Cherokee of Georgia Tribal Council based in Stockbridge, Georgia, another state-recognized tribe. Four different organizations have claimed to be the state-recognized tribe Georgia Tribe of Eastern Cherokee.

More than 200 groups, including state-recognized tribe and unrecognized organization identify as being of Cherokee descent. The three federally recognized Cherokee tribes - the Cherokee Nation, the United Keetoowah Band of Cherokee Indians, and the Eastern Band of Cherokee Indians - have long opposed state-recognized groups, especially those claiming Cherokee heritage, and leaders of the Inter-Tribal Council of the Five Tribes state the group is fraudulent.

The GTEC predominantly descend from two Cherokee people who lived near Dahlonega in northern Georgia who were not forcibly removed in the 1838 Trail of Tears. Over 90% of the members descend from Rachel Martin (Cherokee, 1788–1843) and Daniel Davis (1785–1868), a non-Native man living in Lumpkin County, Georgia, and about 8% trace their ancestry to Pinkney Howell (Cherokee, 1830–1895). They identify as descendants of Cherokees listed on the 1909 Guion Miller Roll.

== Leadership ==
Rhonda Odom Bennett has served as Council Chair of the Georgia Tribe of Eastern Cherokee for more than a decade.

== Nonprofit organization ==
In 2021, the organization incorporated the Georgia Tribe of Eastern Cherokee Foundation as a 501(c)(3) nonprofit organization. Rhonda Bennett serves as the foundation's president.

== State-recognition ==
In 1977, the State of Georgia issued a proclamation "of the continued existence of the Georgia Tribe of Eastern Cherokee".

The US Government Accountability Office stated that the GTEC received state-recognition in 1993.

In 2024 Georgia Code Title 44, lists the tribe among the state’s three state-recognized tribes that it describes as “legitimate American Indian tribes."

In 1995, the Attorney General concluded in Unofficial Opinion 95-21, that although the Georgia Tribe of Eastern Cherokee was recognized by the State of Georgia, state recognition did not create the tribe as a public agency or public authority of the State. Rather, the opinion distinguished recognition of an existing tribe from the legal creation of a governmental entity. The GTEC is not a "public agency, public corporation, or public authority" as described in the Georgia State Constitution.

== Petition for federal recognition ==
The Georgia Tribe of Eastern Cherokee submitted a letter of intent to petition for federal acknowledgment on January 9, 1979, and the organization through Coleman J. Seabolt, subsequently petitioned the Office of Federal Acknowledgment within the Bureau of Indian Affairs.

The Georgia Tribe of Eastern Cherokee petitioned the United States Department of the Interior for federal acknowledgment under the federal acknowledgment regulations administered by the Office of Federal Acknowledgment.

Under the regulations of the time, a petitioner was required to satisfy seven mandatory criteria to qualify for acknowledgment as an Indian tribe eligible for a government-to-government relationship with the United States. Failure to satisfy any one of the seven criteria required the Department to decline acknowledgment.

In its 2016 Proposed Finding, the Office of Federal Acknowledgment concluded that the Georgia Tribe of Eastern Cherokee satisfied four of the seven mandatory criteria.

- Criterion 83.7(d): The petitioner provided a governing document and membership criteria.
- Criterion 83.7(e): The petitioner’s membership consisted of individuals who descended from a historical Indian tribe.
- Criterion 83.7(f): The petitioner’s membership was composed principally of persons who were not members of any federally recognized Indian tribe.
- Criterion 83.7(g): Neither the petitioner nor its members were subject to congressional legislation expressly terminating or forbidding a federal relationship.

The office concluded that the petitioner did not satisfy the three following mandatory criteria.

- Criterion 83.7(a) "required substantially continuous identification of the petitioner as an American Indian entity by external observers since 1900."
- Criterion 83.7(b) "required that a predominant portion of the petitioning group comprise a distinct community that had existed as a community from historical times until the present."
- Criterion 83.7(c) "required that the petitioner demonstrate political influence or authority over its members as an autonomous entity from historical times until the present."

In 2017, the office published its final determination, concluding that the petitioner did not satisfy all mandatory criteria required for federal acknowledgment.

== Activities ==
The Georgia Tribe of Eastern Cherokee is a member of the National Congress of American Indians. Council Chair Rhonda Odom Bennett serves on the Georgia Council on American Indian Concerns and the Lumpkin County Native American Advisory Board. The tribe has also participated in planning efforts for the Georgia Tribe of Eastern Cherokee Heritage Center and the proposed First Nations “Atohi” Heritage Park in the Dahlonega and Auraria area.

The GTEC has also participated in planning for the proposed First Nations “Atohi” Heritage Park, a public heritage initiative intended to interpret the history of Native peoples in North Georgia.

The Georgia Tribe of Eastern Cherokee Heritage Center, planned, as of 2025, for the Auraria area near Dahlonega, is intended to preserve and present the history of Cherokee communities in the region through exhibits, educational programming, archival preservation, and public interpretation.

=== Archives and historical records ===
The Georgia Tribe of Eastern Cherokee maintains historical and genealogical records documenting the history of the tribe and Cherokee families associated with North Georgia.

In 2024, the Atlanta Braves Foundation announced a donation to support preservation of the Georgia Tribe of Eastern Cherokee’s historical records housed in the Special Collections and Archives of the University of North Georgia. The donation formed part of the Braves’ Native American initiatives and was announced in conjunction with “Georgia Tribe Night,” recognizing Georgia’s three state-recognized tribes.

The University of North Georgia has also cataloged archival materials relating to the Georgia Tribe of Eastern Cherokee within its Special Collections and Archives, including records documenting the tribe’s governmental activities and community history.

== Controversies ==
Public discussion concerning the Georgia Tribe of Eastern Cherokee has frequently centered on broader questions of state recognition, federal acknowledgment, and Cherokee identity. In June 2024, the Atlanta Braves hosted “Georgia Tribe Night” in partnership with the Georgia Council on American Indian Concerns, recognizing representatives of Georgia’s state-recognized tribes, including the Georgia Tribe of Eastern Cherokee. Leaders of the Cherokee Nation, the Eastern Band of Cherokee Indians, the United Keetoowah Band of Cherokee Indians, and several other federally recognized tribes issued public statements criticizing the Braves’ recognition of state-recognized tribes and requested that the organization apologize for the event.

In 2024, Chief Ben Barnes of the Shawnee Tribe called for the National Congress of American Indians to limit voting power to federally recognized Tribes. In his address, he regarded the Piqa Shawnee, Georgia Tribe of Eastern Cherokee, and Texas Cherokees as fraudulent.

== See also ==
- Daniel M. Davis House
- Georgia Council on American Indian Concerns
- State-recognized tribes in the United States
- Trail of Tears
- Bureau of Indian Affairs
- Federally recognized Cherokee tribes:

- Cherokee Nation
- Eastern Band of Cherokee Indians
- United Keetoowah Band of Cherokee Indians
