= Simeon Fleischer =

German serial killer (died 1581)

- Born: Fulda, Holy Roman Empire
- Died: 18 January 1581; Neustadt an der Weinstraße, Holy Roman Empire
- Cause of death: Execution by impalement
- Penalty: Death

Details
- Victims: 19 (according to confessions extracted under torture)
- Country: Holy Roman Empire
- Date apprehended: 1581

Simeon Fleischer (executed 18 January 1581) was a purported German serial killer who allegedly murdered 19 wives in the 16th century.

== Life ==
Simeon Fleischer was a wool weaver, born in Fulda. The following is a report of his life based on his confessions.

In Marburg, he married a virgin and received 160 guilders from her father's estate, which he soon acquired. The marriage lasted less than 20 weeks, with Simeon murdering his wife after running out of money, after which he sold her clothes. Not long after he was married again, to a 40-year-old widow. The marriage lasted less than four weeks, whereupon he murdered her as well, taking away 40 guilders. Shortly afterward, he married a farmer's daughter from the County of Hanau, whom he later abandoned. His next wife was the daughter of a tailor. He moved with her to Frankfurt, killing her half-a-mile outside of the town and taking 12 guilders that she had with her. In Frankfurt, he married the wife of a rope maker. The marriage lasted nine weeks, after which Fleischer abandoned her, taking 39 guilders with him. He then moved to Miltenberg, where he married a baker's maid. After only 12 days, he killed her in the woods near Tauberbischofsheim and discarded the body there. The reward was 5 guilders, and he then sold her clothes for 11 guilders. Fleischer then traveled to Bad Mergentheim, marrying a carpenter's daughter there. Under the guise of taking her back to her parents, he threw her into the Main River, near Würzburg. The booty was 3 guilders, selling her clothes in Würzburg. In Würzburg, he married a tavern owner, but murdered her eleven days later, near Rothenburg ob der Tauber. On this occasion, no money was gained. He then killed the daughter of a man named Hafner, from whom he stole 9 guilders. In Dinkelsbühl, he married a squire's maid, whom he then killed near a mill outside of Ellwangen. In Ellwangen he married a blacksmith's daughter, whom he then murdered near Schwäbisch Gmünd with a gain of 13 guilders. In Schwäbisch Gmünd, he married a landlady, whom he drowned in a river near Marbach am Neckar. His next target was a seamstress, with whom he stayed for three weeks, before extorting 28 guilders from her. With the previous stolen money, he moved to Pforzheim, marrying a young baker's daughter, whom he later killed. He then eliminated another wife in Baden-Baden. A similar crime occurred in Rastatt. A third such was allegedly committed either in Baden-Baden or Rastatt. Three guilders were taken from this crime scene. At Offenburg, he married a tailor's daughter, whom he then killed in Strasbourg. Another was killed in either Strasbourg or Haguenau. Another three women were killed after this, but no locations were given. In Wissembourg, he married a rich widow, who provided him with much money. He murdered both her and her daughter in the forest near Kandel. He stayed in Seltz for about five days and married a maid. Not long after, he threw her down a well in Landau, stealing 18 guilders from her beforehand. In Speyer, he murdered the daughter of a man named Wagner. In Grünstadt, he married another woman, whom he cruelly murdered after eleven days. In Alzey, he married a baker's daughter, whom he then murdered near Bad Kreuznach. Not long after, he killed another woman, from whom he stole 60 guilders. He promised to marry a rich farmer's daughter in Kaiserslautern, for which he was given 100 guilders. After five weeks, he threw her into a latrine. At Neustadt an der Weinstraße, he married a tailor's maid. The marriage lasted only seven days, after which he murdered her, but was then caught red-handed and arrested.

After he was taken prisoner to Neustadt an der Weinstraße, after several days of torture, he confessed that in six years, he had married 31 women and murdered 19 of them, indicating where most of the crime scenes had happened.

On 18 January 1581, Simeon Fleischer was executed. He was impaled, torn to pieces with red-hot pliers, with hands and feet pinched off. The whole process lasted a total of three days.

== Origin ==
Fleischer's murderous acts are only preserved in an undated and unpaginated - probably created after 1581 - without any indication as to who and where printed it, claiming that it was made in Colophon as part of a reprint originating from Basel. The songs include three murder ballads to serial killers executed in 1581. The only known copy is located at the Jena University Library, the unpaginated pages [13] and [14] were incorporated in a restoration and therefore posted online.

- The life of robber Christman Genipperteinga (here referred to as Christmas Gniperdoliga), who confessed to 964 murders.
- The life of robber Peter Niers, who confessed to 250 murders.
- The life of murderer Simeon Fleischer, who confessed to 19 murders.

Genipperteinga and Niers' stories were picked up and retold more than that of Fleischer, who was left in relative obscurity.

== Evaluation ==
The historian Joy Wiltenburg undertook critical studies of the ballads handed down in prints from the early modern period, most of which originated from the 1570s and 1580s. In the grey area of oral tradition, there are various possibilities: (1) The crimes were real, but this is impossible to verify today. (2) Or, the confessions were extracted under torture, so the guilt or innocence of the perpetrators couldn't be determined. (3) The crimes were entirely fictitious, and created for entertainment. It is unknown whether the people named really existed or were executed, including Simeon Fleischer.

== Literature ==
- Dreyerley Newspaper.|| in singing white. || The first from the terrifying || M # [oe] rder Peter Nirschen / how he judges and what || he confessed / Jn the 1581st Jar zu Nüwen || March 16th of September. || Jm Thon / It's a fresh summer. || The other of a M # [oe] rder Christian = || one called Gniperdoliga / which of his || youths to 964. M # [oe] rd has done / Jm Thon || Help God that I succeed # [et] c. || The third of an honorable B # [oe] ßwicht / || which 31st wives taken / and 19th da = || rounder erm # [oe] rdt. Jm thon / Eternal Father # [et] c.|| Digitalisat der UB Jena (in German)
- Michael Kirchschlager: Human monsters from the late Middle Ages to the end of the 19th century (= historical serial killers. Vol. 1 = library of horror. Vol. 6). Kirchschlager, Arnstadt 2007, ISBN 978-3-934277-13-7, S. 66–69 (in German)
- Joy Wiltenburg: Crime and Culture in Early Modern Germany. University of Virginia Press. 2012. ISBN 978-081-393-302-3.

== See also ==
- Christman Genipperteinga
- Peter Niers
- List of German serial killers
