= Vancleave Live Oak Choctaw =

Unrecognized tribe in Mississippi, US

- Abbreviation: Live Oak Choctaw
- Named after: Vancleave, MS; Choctaw people
- Formation: June 25, 2015; 11 years ago
- Merger of: Live Oak Pond Choctaw People (2010-2015); Vancleave Live Oak Choctaw Corp.(2013-2015)
- Type: unrecognized tribe, nonprofit organization
- Tax ID no.: EIN 46-3568769
- Headquarters: Vancleave, MS
- Location: United States
- Members: 2,000 (2014)
- Official language: English
- Tribal Chairman: Terry Ladnier

The Vancleave Live Oak Choctaw or Vancleave Live Oak Choctaw Tribe is an unrecognized tribe and nonprofit organization based in Vancleave, Mississippi. The State of Mississippi, through House Resolution 50 (HR50), ceremonially recognized the Vancleave Live Oak Choctaw as "The Official Native American Tribe of the Choctaw People of Jackson County, Mississippi" in 2016. This legislative action acknowledges the tribe's historical and cultural significance in the state. Since Mississippi lacks an office to manage Indian affairs or any formalized process to recognize tribes, the tribe's status as "state recognized" has been disputed by some, with the National Conference of State Legislatures (NCSL) considering Mississippi as having no state-recognized tribes. The Vancleave Live Oak Choctaw are not federally recognized as a Native American tribe. The Mississippi Band of Choctaw Indians is the only federally recognized tribe in the state of Mississippi.

The Live Oak Choctaw claim descent from Choctaw ancestors who remained in Mississippi after the Treaty of Dancing Rabbit Creek, intermarrying with French settlers along the Gulf Coast. Sometimes identified by locals as "Redbones", "Vancleave Creoles," or “Vancleave Indians” in the 20th century, the ancestors of the tribe were considered a creole group of mixed ancestry and faced discrimination due to suspicions of African heritage. In 1919, members established the Live Oak Pond Indian Creole School. Their Choctaw identity was locally affirmed in 2014 when the Chancery Court of Jackson County, Mississippi, recognized their tribal status. The tribe maintains that it is the only state-recognized tribe within Mississippi owed to this determination.

== Organization ==
In 2013, the Vancleave Indian Tribe incorporated as the Vancleave Live Oak Choctaw Corporation, a Mississippi nonprofit. Following tribal elections, a splinter group contested the results and initiated legal action to determine which entity had the right to pursue federal recognition with the Bureau of Indian Affairs. The lawsuit led to the voluntary dissolution of both corporations, resulting in their merger into a new nonprofit entity, Vancleave Live Oak Choctaw, which was officially recognized by the Chancery Court of Jackson County, Mississippi, in 2014. The tribe is governed by a tribal council and headed by a chairman.

== History ==
The ancestors of the Live Oak Choctaw were of a creole background, descending from early European settlers in the region, along with Native American ancestors, and, in some family lines, West Africans. Due to their geographic isolation in remote areas, the community practiced endogamy, intermarrying within their established families for generations. This distinct heritage contributed to their unique cultural identity while also subjecting them to external scrutiny and shifting racial classifications over time. By the early 20th century, the group faced racial discrimination and segregation in Mississippi. While classified as white in some contexts, they were at other times scrutinized by local residents for some member's presumed African ancestry, leading to social and educational barriers.

In response to this segregation, community leaders supported Mississippi Senate Bill No. 347 in 1918, which provided education for Native American children in the state. In 1919, a community elder, Edward Bang, sold land for the establishment of the Live Oak Pond Indian Creole School. The school, constructed by the community, reflected their distinct identity and provided education up to the eighth grade. It remained in operation until 1965, when integration led to its closure. Due to limited access to higher education, many children from the community were unable to attend high school.

Students in front of the Live Oak Pond Indian Creole School, Vancleave, Mississippi.

Racial classification remained a source of tension throughout the 20th century. Despite being accepted in some white institutions, members continued to be scrutinized and faced suspicion regarding their racial background. In 1964, a couple from Biloxi, Mississippi wrote to Mississippi Governor Paul B. Johnson Jr., expressing concern that their daughter was in a relationship with a young man from Vancleave, whom locals suspected of having African ancestry. Johnson commissioned an investigation into the young man, concluding that while he could not be definitively classified as African American, he was also not considered fully Caucasian. The report identified him a belonging to group sometimes whose members were sometimes identified as "Redbones" or "Vancleave Indians". Johnson confirmed that members were rumored by neighbors to have mixed racial ancestry despite sometimes attending white schools and churches.

By the early 21st century, members of the community began formally organizing to assert their ethnic identity. They sought to document their history, preserve cultural traditions, and pursue federal recognition as a tribe. These efforts culminated in the early 21st century with the incorporation of a tribal organization and the legal proceedings that followed. In 2013, the Vancleave Indian Tribe incorporated as the Vancleave Live Oak Choctaw Corporation. A legal dispute arose between rival factions over the right to petition for federal recognition, leading to the dissolution of both entities and their merger into a new organization, which was recognized by the Chancery Court of Jackson County, Mississippi in 2014.

=== Local tradition of origin ===
In the past, local tradition in Vancleave held that the origins of the Live Oak Choctaw, or "Vancleave Creoles," were linked to historical trade along Bluff Creek, a nearby waterway that was once deep enough to accommodate large schooners. These vessels transported turpentine and charcoal, two of the region's primary exports, and often remained docked for several days while loading supplies. Oral histories suggested that boat captains and their crews, many of whom were of French or Spanish origin, interacted with local residents, including those of European, African American, and Native American backgrounds. Some proposed that the ancestry of the "Vancleave Creoles" may have been influenced by these historic interactions.

=== Heritage ===
Common surnames among the Live Oak Choctaw include Ely, Bang, Boudreau, Ladnier, and Waltman. Some individuals with these surnames reportedly applied for enrollment with the Dawes Commission in the nineteenth century but were not approved. According to other accounts, documentation needed to verify ancestry may have been lost due to courthouse fires. Surviving historical records, particularly church records, often listed women only as "Indian" or "half-breed" without providing names or specific tribal affiliations, which has presented challenges for the Live Oak Choctaw in genealogical research.

== Other activities ==
On December 5, 2015, the City of Ocean Springs, Mississippi, issued a proclamation recognizing the Vancleave Live Oak Choctaw and officially designating the date as Vancleave Live Oak Choctaw Day.

The Live Oak Choctaw hold an annual ceremonial fire, featuring traditional rituals, water blessings, and flag retirements. The event emphasizes cultural education and has drawn participants from other tribal groups. In 2018, the tribe contributed to the Smithsonian Waterways exhibit at the Ocean Springs Library, showcasing artifacts and traditions.

The tribe is involved in efforts to restore elements of their heritage, including Choctaw language and other forms of traditional culture.

In 2022, the Vancleave Live Oak Choctaw erected a marker near Jackson Square in New Orleans honoring Jean Baptiste Baudreau II, a colonial diplomat executed in 1757 and believed to be the son of a Choctaw woman. Historians regard his execution as a miscarriage of justice.

== See also ==
- Choctaw
- Creole peoples
- Louisiana Creoles
- Redbone (ethnicity)
- Jacob L. Reddix
