= Ethel Sawyer Adolphe =

African-American civil rights activist and sociology professor (born 1961)

Ethel Sawyer Adolphe is a civil rights activist and sociology professor. She is known for her role in the Sit-in movement and contributions to the Sociology of Black Americans.

== Tougaloo Nine ==
On March 27, 1961, Ethel Sawyer was arrested for participating in a sit-in at the Jackson Public library in what would be called the Tougaloo Nine. She was mentored along with eight other Tougaloo College students by NAACP organizer Medgar Evers and trained to sustain provocation. The action led to desegregating the library in 1962 and was among the earliest desegregation victories in Mississippi.

== Sociology ==
In 1964, as a graduate student in the former Sociology department at Washington University in St. Louis, Sawyer studied a group of Black lesbians who congregated at a bar in The Ville, St. Louis. She initially met members of the group when collecting research at the Pruitt–Igoe housing complex. Her resulting MA thesis "A Study of a Public Lesbian Community" was the first known sociological study of an African American lesbian community in the United States.

Sawyer started her career in 1967 as a researcher for the Tufts University Delta Health Center project in Mound Bayou Mississippi, leaving there to teach full time at Haverford College for one year and Temple University for two years, returning to St. Louis in 1971 to be married. She began teaching at St. Louis Community College–Forest Park as assistant professor of sociology in 1971. She became chair of the sociology department in 1974, promoted to associate professor in 1975, and was appointed to associate dean in 1978. Sawyer filed a discrimination complaint following an attempt by the Dean of Instruction to remove her from administrative position.

== Personal life ==
Sawyer was born in Mississippi and grew up in Memphis, Tennessee. Her father worked a freight handler for Union Pacific Railroad, and she was the first member of her family to attend college. She was married in 1971 in St. Louis, with classmates from Tougaloo College in attendance.

In 2018, she was honored as a Tougaloo College Influencer.

In 2023, St. Louis Board of Aldermen approved a resolution from Shameem Clark Hubbard honoring Ms. Ethel Sawyer for contributions to civil rights and her community.
