= Vancleave, Mississippi =

- Census-designated place
- Location of Vancleave, Mississippi

- Location in the United States
- Coordinates: 30°32′49″N 88°40′21″W
- Country: United States of America
- State: Mississippi
- County: Jackson

Area
  - Total: 44.15 sq mi (114.34 km^{2})
  - Land: 43.14 sq mi (111.74 km^{2})
  - Water: 1.00 sq mi (2.60 km^{2})
- Elevation: 30 ft (9 m)

Population (2020)
  - Total: 5,592
  - Density: 129.6/sq mi (50.05/km^{2})
- Time zone: UTC-6 (Central (CST))
  - Summer (DST): UTC-5 (CDT)
- ZIP code: 39565
- Area code: 228
- FIPS code: 28-76200
- GNIS feature ID: 0689195

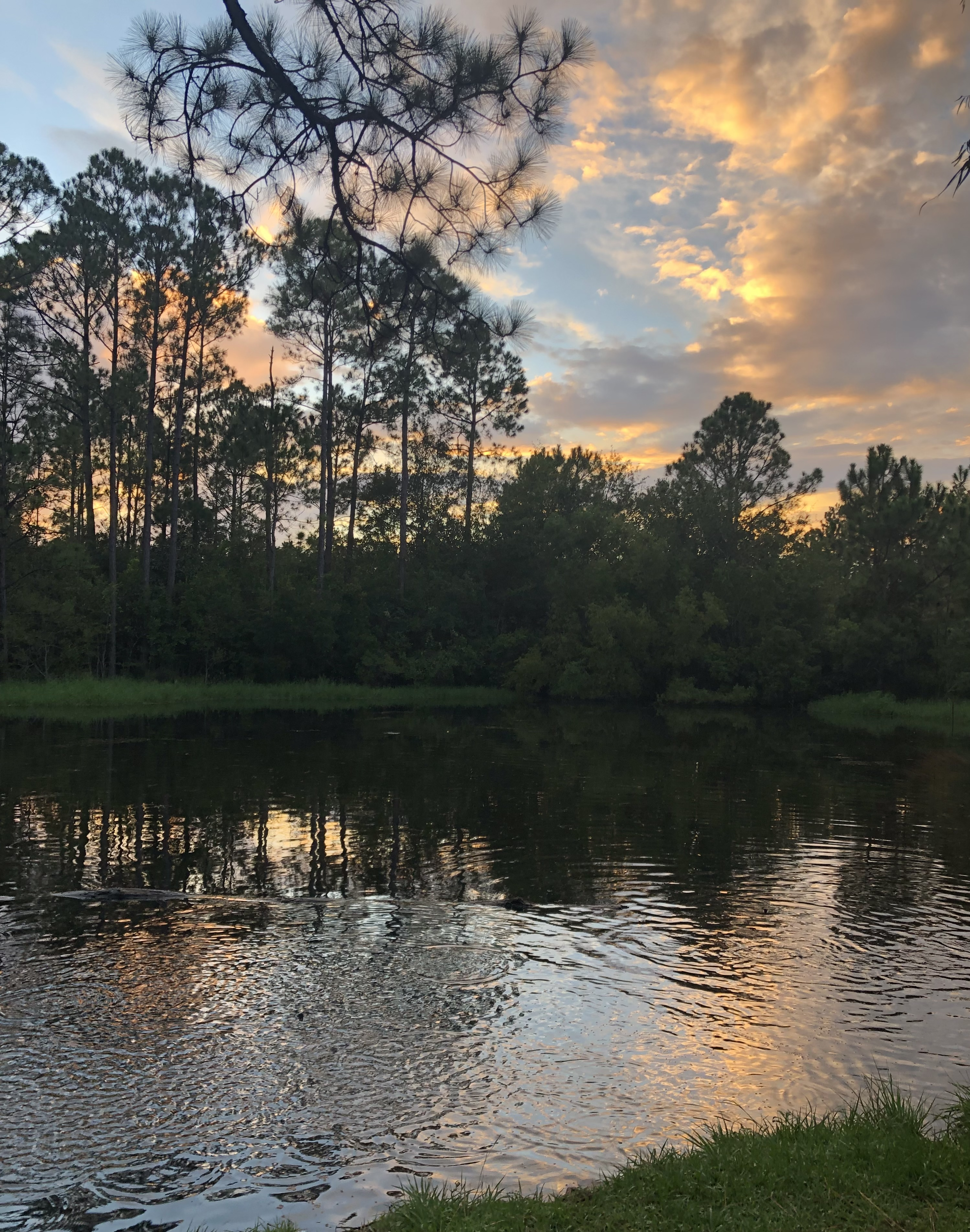
Scenery in Vancleave, Mississippi

Vancleave is an unincorporated community and census-designated place (CDP) in Jackson County, Mississippi, United States. It is part of the Pascagoula Metropolitan Statistical Area. As of the 2020 census, Vancleave had a population of 5,592.

== Geography ==
Vancleave occupies a large portion of central Jackson County; according to the United States Census Bureau, the CDP has a total area of 44.1 square miles (114.3 km^{2}), of which 43.2 square miles (111.8 km^{2}) are land and 0.97 square miles (2.5 km^{2}), or 2.21%, are water. The original hamlet of Vancleave is along Mississippi Highway 57 on high ground north of the valley of Bluff Creek. The CDP limits extend north as far as Mississippi Highway 614 (Wade–Vancleave Road), east to the Pascagoula River and Ward Bayou, and south to the Gautier city line at the mouth of Bluff Creek. The western boundary is formed mainly by Bluff Creek and Highway 57. Vancleave is 18 miles (29 km) northwest of Pascagoula, the Jackson county seat, and 19 miles (31 km) northeast of Biloxi.

== Demographics ==
Historical population
Census	Pop.	Note	%±
2000	4,910		—
2010	5,886		19.9%
2020	5,592		−5.0%
U.S. Decennial Census

=== 2020 census ===
Vancleave racial composition
Race	Num.	Perc.
White (non-Hispanic)	4,805	85.93%
Black or African American (non-Hispanic)	234	4.18%
Native American	63	1.13%
Asian	27	0.48%
Other/Mixed	297	5.31%
Hispanic or Latino	166	2.97%

As of the 2020 census, there were 5,592 people, 2,022 households, and 1,224 families residing in the CDP.

The median age was 42.3 years. 23.4% of residents were under the age of 18 and 17.6% of residents were 65 years of age or older. For every 100 females there were 104.5 males, and for every 100 females age 18 and over there were 101.8 males age 18 and over.

0.0% of residents lived in urban areas, while 100.0% lived in rural areas.

Of the 2,022 households, 33.2% had children under the age of 18 living in them. Of all households, 58.4% were married-couple households, 17.7% were households with a male householder and no spouse or partner present, and 19.3% were households with a female householder and no spouse or partner present. About 22.2% of all households were made up of individuals, and 10.0% had someone living alone who was 65 years of age or older.

There were 2,291 housing units, of which 11.7% were vacant. The homeowner vacancy rate was 1.2% and the rental vacancy rate was 5.6%.

=== 2000 census ===
As of the census of 2000, there were 4,910 people, 1,624 households, and 1,354 families residing in the CDP. The population density was 113.1 inhabitants per square mile (43.7/km^{2}). There were 1,764 housing units at an average density of 40.6 per square mile (15.7/km^{2}). The racial makeup of the CDP was 91.20% White, 6.74% African American, 0.57% Native American, 0.26% Asian, 0.24% from other races, and 0.98% from two or more races. Hispanic or Latino of any race were 0.96% of the population.

There were 1,624 households, out of which 41.8% had children under the age of 18 living with them, 68.8% were married couples living together, 10.1% had a female householder with no husband present, and 16.6% were non-families. 13.6% of all households were made up of individuals, and 5.5% had someone living alone who was 65 years of age or older. The average household size was 3.00 and the average family size was 3.30.

In the CDP, the population was spread out, with 29.6% under the age of 18, 8.2% from 18 to 24, 29.9% from 25 to 44, 23.0% from 45 to 64, and 9.3% who were 65 years of age or older. The median age was 34 years. For every 100 females, there were 104.9 males. For every 100 females age 18 and over, there were 102.3 males.

The median income for a household in the CDP was $39,034, and the median income for a family was $41,426. Males had a median income of $36,135 versus $21,078 for females. The per capita income for the CDP was $14,349. About 9.6% of families and 13.9% of the population were below the poverty line, including 19.8% of those under age 18 and 12.2% of those age 65 or over.

=== Fire department ===
The Central Jackson County Fire Department provides fire protection for the community.

=== Law enforcement ===
The Jackson County Sheriff's Office provides law enforcement services for the community.

== Education ==
Vancleave is served by the Jackson County School District. It includes two elementary schools, one middle school, and one high school. Vancleave is also home to a branch of the Jackson-George Regional Library, located at 12604 Highway 57.

=== Elementary schools ===
- Vancleave Lower Elementary School
- Vancleave Upper Elementary School

=== Middle school ===
- Vancleave Middle School

=== High school ===
- Vancleave High School

== Vancleave Live Oak Choctaw ==
Vancleave is home to the Vancleave Live Oak Choctaw, a group historically known as the Vancleave Indians or Vancleave Creoles. The State of Mississippi, through House Resolution 50 (HR50), ceremonially recognized the Live Oak Choctaw as "The Official Native American Tribe of the Choctaw People of Jackson County, Mississippi" in 2016. This legislative action acknowledges the tribe's historical and cultural significance in the state. While locally acknowledged, the tribe is not federally recognized as a Native American tribe.

== Notable people ==
- Elley Duhé — pop music singer-songwriter
- Paul Overstreet — Nashville singer-songwriter ("Diggin' Up Bones")
- Jacob L. Reddix (1897–1973) — educator, university president
- Mike Seymour — member of the Mississippi State Senate
- Chris White — football linebacker with the New England Patriots
