= Tougaloo Nine =

African-American students at Tougaloo College who participated in civil disobedience

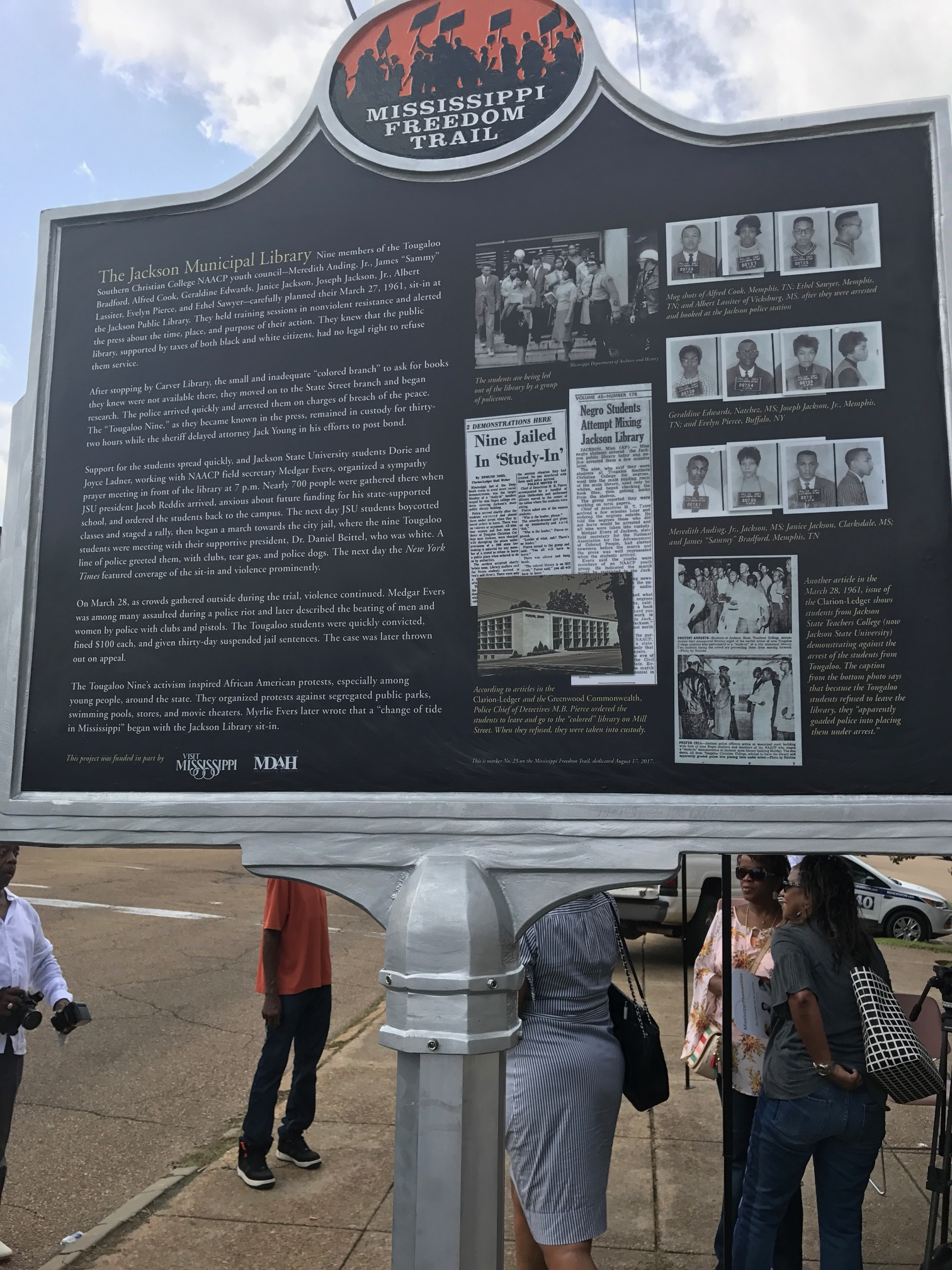
The Jackson Municipal Library Sign on the Mississippi Freedom Trail

The Tougaloo Nine were a group of African-American students at Tougaloo College, who participated in civil disobedience by staging sit-ins of segregated public institutions in Mississippi in 1961.

== History ==
The Civil Rights Movement began slowly in the South, especially in Mississippi. Before 1955, it was mostly legal challenges and litigation, plus isolated protests against the obstruction of voting rights for black Americans. Groups formed during this time period include the Mississippi Progressive Voters' League and the Regional Council of Negro Leadership. In the 1960s, more young people began to participate in the Civil Rights Movement.

Civil rights organizer Medgar Evers considered Mississippi to be "too racist and violent" to conduct lunch counter sit-ins. In 1961 he chose the public library in Jackson as a segregation protest site because it was supported by both black and white taxpayers, rather than being a private business. He recruited nine students from Tougaloo College for the first action. They were trained in nonviolent resistance, and were members of the NAACP Youth Council. They were led by Joseph Jackson Jr., and included Albert Lassiter, Alfred Cook, Ethel Sawyer, Geraldine Edwards, Evelyn Pierce, Janice Jackson, James Bradford, and Meredith Anding Jr.

== Read-in ==
On March 27, 1961, the nine students visited Jackson's library for black residents, George Washington Carver, and requested books they knew were not there. They then entered the main Jackson Public Library for white residents, and staged a "read in".

The nine students began to search for source materials for class assignments, and sat down in the library and began to read. At this time, the library staff called the police. They were told "There's a colored library on Mill Street.... You are welcome there." The chief of detectives told them that anyone who wouldn't leave would be arrested. He also asked who the leader of the group was, and Evelyn Pierce said "There's no leader." When they refused to leave, they were arrested and charged with breach of the peace for failing to leave when ordered to do so.

The students were subject to a possible $500 fine and six months of jail. That following day, on March 28, the nine students were released on one-thousand dollar bond.

== Protests ==
The day after the Read-In, hundreds of students from Jackson State Teachers College picketed the arrest of the Tougaloo Nine prior to their release. the demonstration, consisting of prayers, singing and chants of "We Want Freedom," lasted for around 40 minutes. The President of Jackson State College, Jacob Reddix, was alleged to have assaulted two demonstrators during the protest. Reddix also threatened to expel student demonstrators. Police utilized clubs and dogs against the students in order to disband the protest. No protestors were arrested.

The next day, March 29, over one hundred black community members congregated outside of the courthouse to show support for the Nine. As protesters applauded the arrival of the Tougaloo Nine at the courthouse, policemen set on the crowd with dogs and nightsticks resulting in the beating of NAACP representative Medgar Evers along with several women and children, two men being bitten by dogs, and an 81-year-old man suffering a broken arm when police beat him with a nightstick. Reverend S. Leon Whitney, a pastor of Farish Street Baptist Church, was among those bitten by police dogs. Medgar Evers later reflected "This act on the part of the police officials brought on greater unity in the Negro community and projected the NAACP in a position of being the accepted spokesman." A Jackson reporter summarized the event by saying, "A quiet community has been invaded by rabble-rousers stirring up hate between the races, and following are the…publicity media feeding an integrated North the choicest morsels from the Mississippi carcass.…The Negro who has so long held the guiding and helping hand of the white may lose that hand as he climbs the back of his benefactor and teacher to shout into halls where he is not welcome."

=== Use of dogs ===
Dogs (particularly German shepherds) were used during the civil rights movement by police officers to intimidate (and in some cases harm) protestors. During the trial of the Tougaloo Nine, fourteen police officers and two German shepherds lined the courthouse stairs. The dogs were “set upon” by people when a small crowd, which had gathered in support of the Tougaloo Nine, applauded. The dogs were responsible for biting two black ministers. The Tougaloo Nine trial was not the only instance dogs were used during the Civil Rights Movement. In 1963 in Birmingham, Alabama a German shepherd attacked a 15-year-old named Walter Gadsden during a civil rights demonstration. Gadsden was grabbed by a police officer while the dog he was holding lunged and made contact with Gadsden's stomach. In response to these events, NAACP partners coined the phrase “rights not bites."

== Aftermath ==
The students appeared in court on March 29, and were not allowed to see their attorneys Jack Young and R. Jess Brown before their hearing. They were fined $100 each and given a thirty-day suspended sentence and year's probation on condition that they “participate in no further demonstrations."

In protest of the sentencing and the brutality of police towards bystanders, a meeting was held at a local Masonic Temple, at which Julie Wright encouraged other black community members to participate in a "No Buying Campaign". This campaign saw the successful boycotting of white business that discriminated against black people, and chain stores reportedly lost $49,225 in sales tax revenues.

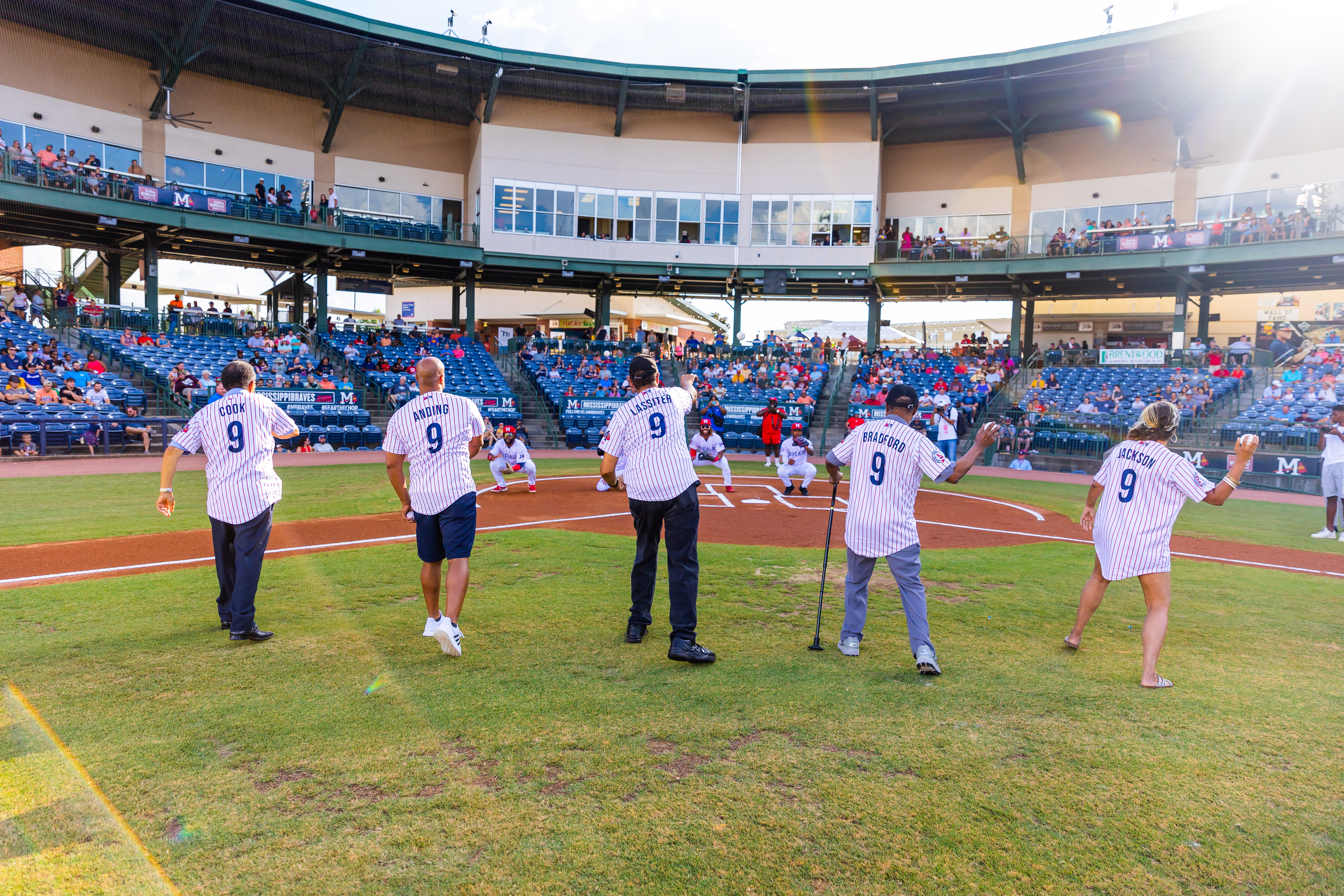
The Tougaloo Nine and family members were commemorated at Trustmark Park in Pearl, Mississippi and threw out ceremonial first pitches.

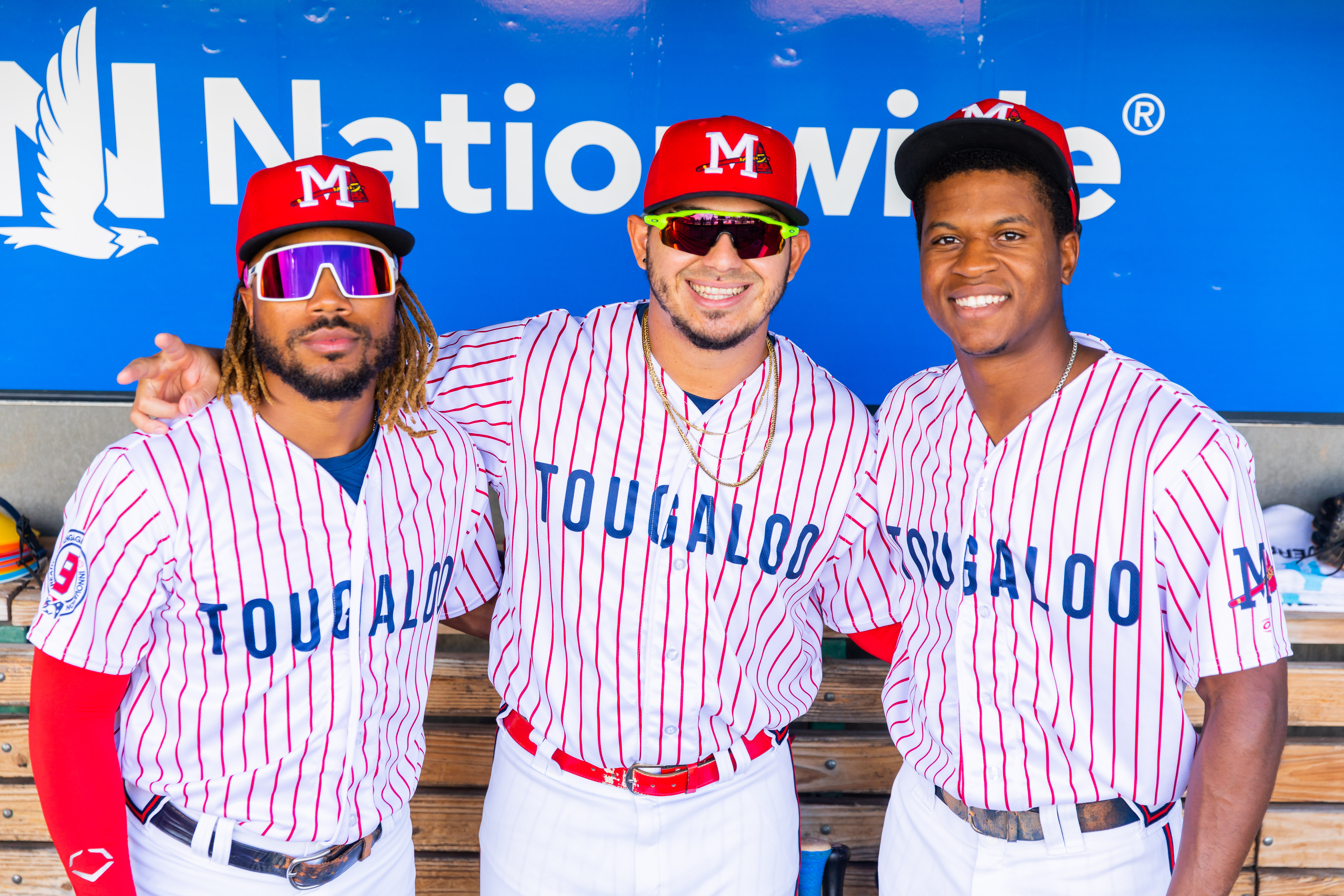
Mississippi Braves players wearing Tougaloo College jerseys.

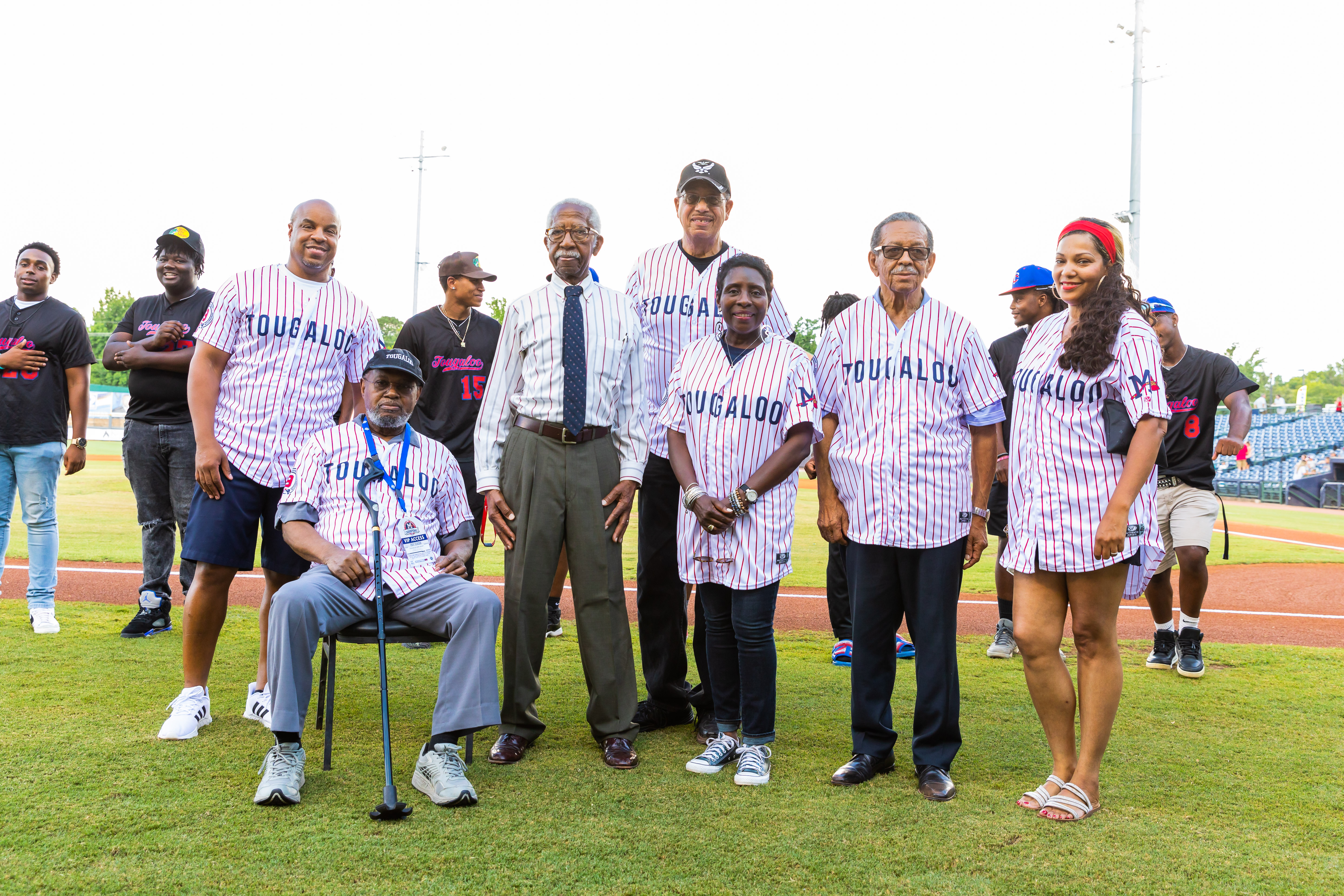
The Tougaloo Nine were commemorated on-field at Trustmark Park in Pearl, Mississippi.

In 1962, partially as a result of this event, the American Library Association membership adopted the "Statement on Individual Membership, Chapter Status and Institutional Membership" which stated that membership in the association and its chapters had to be open to everyone regardless of race, religion, or personal belief. Four state chapters withdrew from ALA: Alabama, Georgia, Louisiana and Mississippi.

Unlike the Freedom Riders, Friendship Nine, and Little Rock Nine, the Tougaloo Nine are not as well known historically. Sammy Bradford, one of the Tougaloo Nine, said on the occasion of the read-in anniversary: "It seems that everybody is being celebrated and praised for their fine work except the very people who launched the civil rights movement against some of the greatest odds ever faced by man or beast. I'm not saying that the Tougaloo Nine should be rolled out like world-conquering heroes in a ticker-tape parade every year, but they should at least be acknowledged, along with many others, whenever a purported celebration of civil rights activities in Mississippi takes place."

In August 2017, a historical marker on the Mississippi Freedom Trail was dedicated to the Tougaloo Nine. During the May 2021 commencement of Tougaloo College, all nine will receive honorary doctorates.

In July 2022, the Mississippi Braves and the Mississippi Civil Rights Museum commemorated the Tougaloo Nine while wearing 1960s era Tougaloo College baseball jerseys with the name of a Tougaloo Nine member on the back along with a presentation featuring Nine members. Living members of the Tougaloo Nine threw our ceremonial first pitches. The jerseys were auctioned off for the Ella Josephine Baker scholarship at Tougaloo College.

== The Nine ==
- Joseph Jackson Jr.
- Albert Lassiter
- Alfred Cook
- Ethel Sawyer
- Geraldine Edwards Hollis
- Evelyn Pierce (died 2010)
- Janice Jackson
- James "Sammy" Bradford
- Meredith C. Anding Jr. (died 2021)
