= Chris White (linebacker) =

American football player (born 1989)

No. 51, 59
- Position: Linebacker

Personal information
- Born: January 15, 1989 (age 37); Mobile, Alabama, U.S.
- Listed height: 6 ft 3 in (1.91 m)
- Listed weight: 238 lb (108 kg)

Career information
- High school: Vancleave (Vancleave, Mississippi)
- College: Mississippi State
- NFL draft: 2011: 6th round, 169th overall pick

Career history
- Buffalo Bills (2011–2012); Detroit Lions (2013)*; New England Patriots (2013–2014)
- * Offseason or practice squad member only

Awards and highlights
- Super Bowl champion (XLIX); Conerly Trophy (2010); First-team All-SEC (2010)

Career NFL statistics
- Total tackles: 35
- Forced fumbles: 1
- Stats at Pro Football Reference

Christopher Andrew White (born January 15, 1989) is an American former professional football player who was a linebacker in the National Football League (NFL). He was selected by the Buffalo Bills in the sixth round of the 2011 NFL draft. White attended Vancleave (Miss.) High School. He played college football for the Mississippi Gulf Coast Bulldogs and Mississippi State Bulldogs.

== Career ==
Pre-draft measurables
Height	Weight	Arm length	Hand span	Wingspan	40-yard dash	10-yard split	20-yard split	20-yard shuttle	Three-cone drill	Vertical jump	Broad jump	Bench press
6 ft 2 3/4 in (1.90 m)	240 lb (109 kg)	30 7/8 in (0.78 m)	9 in (0.23 m)	6 ft 4 3/8 in (1.94 m)	4.73 s	1.66 s	2.76 s	4.25 s	6.95 s	34.0 in (0.86 m)	9 ft 7 in (2.92 m)	17 reps
All values from NFL Combine

=== Buffalo Bills ===
White was selected by the Buffalo Bills in the sixth round of the 2011 NFL draft.

=== Detroit Lions ===
On August 25, 2013, White was traded to the Detroit Lions in exchange for Thaddeus Lewis.

=== New England Patriots ===
On September 1, 2013, White was claimed off waivers by the New England Patriots.

White was a member of the Patriots when they won Super Bowl XLIX over the Seattle Seahawks, 28–24. On August 10, 2015, the Patriots released White.
