= Matthias Klostermayr =

German outlaw

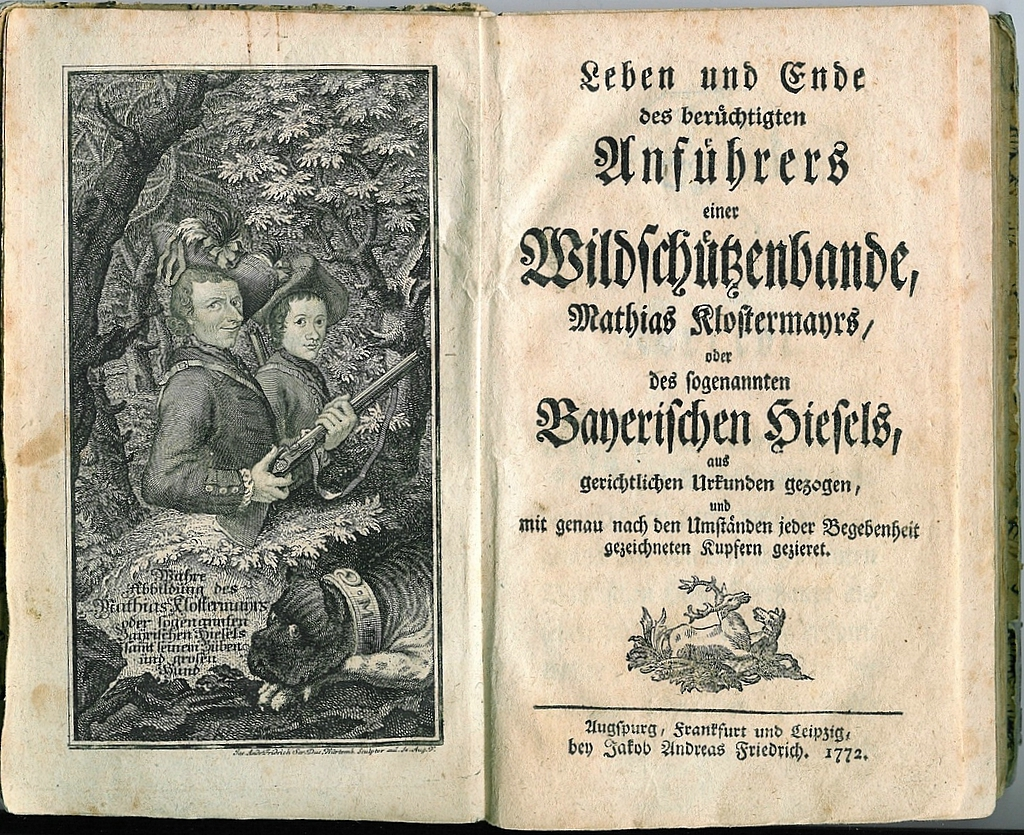
Biography from 1772

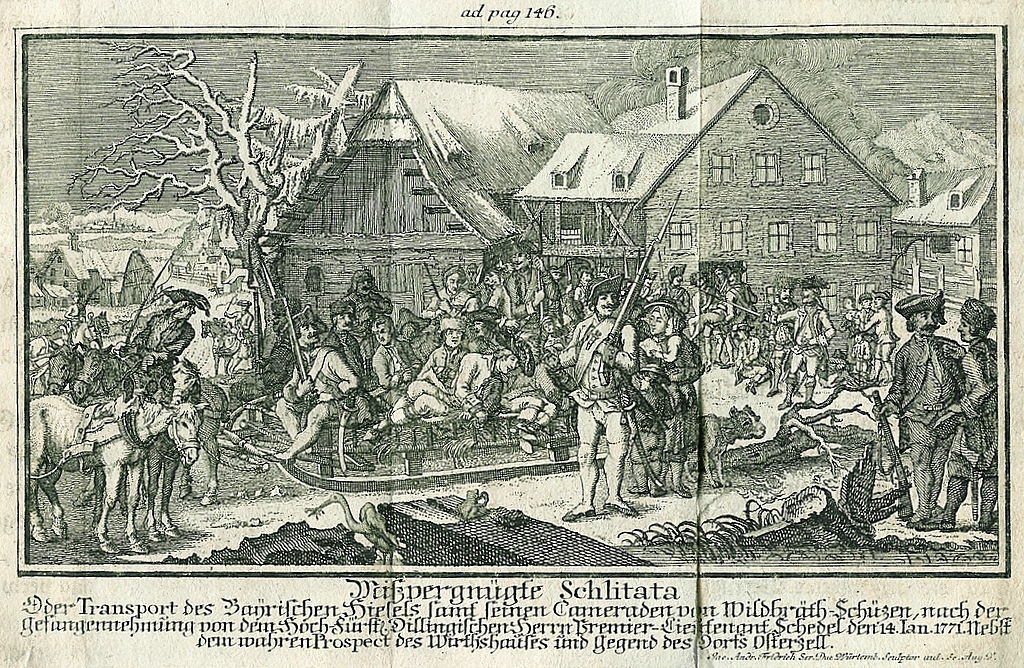
The Bavarian Hiasl Gang arrested

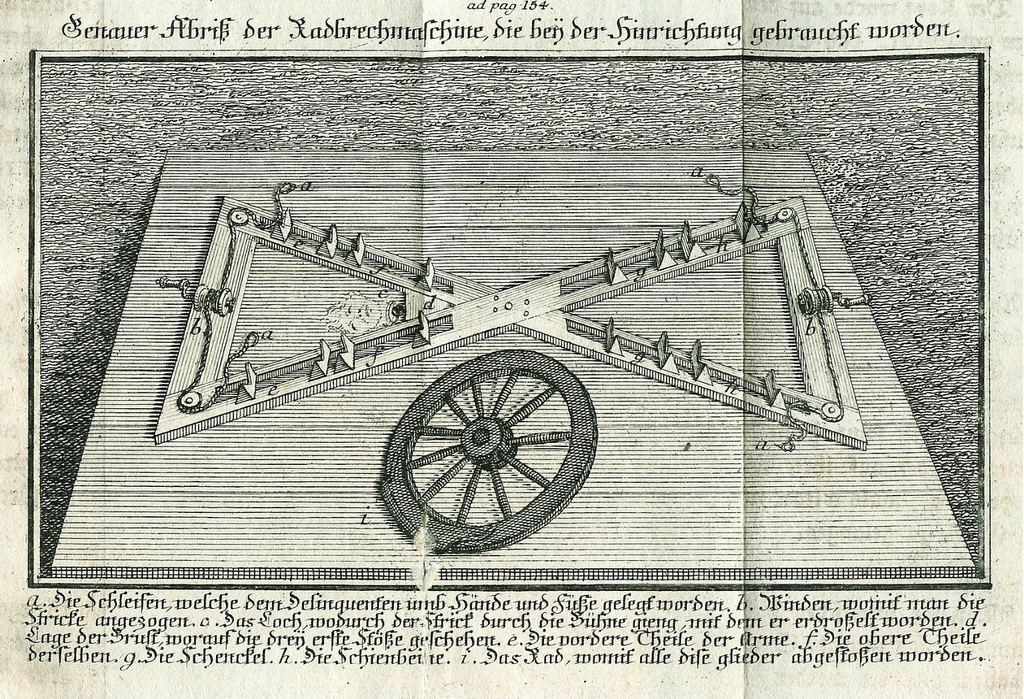
Breaking wheel (bonebreaker machine)

Matthias Klostermayr, also known as Bavarian Hiasl (German Bayerischer Hiasl, Austro-Bavarian Boarische Hiasl) (3 September 1736—6 September 1771), was a German outlaw, poacher and social rebel who has come to be described, particularly in accounts written in the English-speaking world, as the Bavarian Robin Hood. A native of the municipality of Kissing near Augsburg (his name on the baptismal register is Mattheus Klostermair—the Austro-Bavarian spelling of it), Bavarian Hiasl became an outlaw, first as a poacher and ultimately as the Robin Hood-like leader of a gang of robbers who, during the 1760s, plundered, sacked and robbed in the region around Munich, Augsburg and Swabia. Although he was captured and put to death by being broken on the wheel in 1771, his mythical accumulated treasure has never been found, and legends surrounding its purported whereabouts have placed it somewhere near one of his hideouts, in an old cave in Kuchelschlag Wood or on Jexhof Farm.

In Bavaria and elsewhere, he has become a folk hero, with books, songs, musicals and a modern multimedia museum in Kissing ("Hiasl Erlebniswelt", or "the World of Hiasl") dedicated to him. The museum recreates for visitors the life and times of the "German prince of forests", the "Bavarian Robin Hood", whose gruesome execution took place in Dillingen an der Donau. Friedrich Schiller is presumed to have based Karl Moor, the tragic protagonist of his first play, The Robbers, on the Bavarian Hiasl ten years later, in 1781.
