= Vancleave High School =

Location
- 12424 MS-57; Vancleave, Mississippi; Vancleave, Jackson County, Mississippi, 39565 39565; United States
- 30.5232°N 88.6884°W

Information
- School type: public
- Religious affiliation: None
- Established: 1907
- School district: Jackson County School District
- Superintendent: David Baggett
- Principal: Raina Holmes
- Teaching staff: 45.97 (FTE)
- Grades: 9–12
- Enrollment: 745 (2023-2024)
- Student to teacher ratio: 16.21
- Color
- Athletics: Soccer, Football, Basketball, Swim Team, Baseball, Volleyball, Track, Cross Country, Softball, Tennis, Golf.
- Athletics conference: 5-A
- Mascot: Bulldogs
- Nickname: Bulldogs
- Team name: Bulldogs
- Rival: East Central Hornets
- Website: vhs.jcsd.ms

Vancleave High School is a "High Performing" public high school located in the unincorporated community of Vancleave, Mississippi, United States. The school serves students in grades 9–12 and is a part of the Jackson County School District in Mississippi. The campus is located on 12424 MS-57 in Vancleave.

== Athletics ==
The Vancleave High School sports team mascot is the bulldog. Vancleave Athletics consists of football, track, swimming, cross country, softball, soccer, volleyball, basketball, golf, baseball, girls and boys powerlifting, girls flag football, and wrestling.

== Faculty ==
Vancleave High School's faculty comprises a principal, an assistant principal, secretaries, counselors, and teachers. Vancleave Schools are also overseen by an assistant superintendent and three bookkeepers.

=== Administration ===
- Current Superintendent, David Baggett
- Assistant Superintendent of Curriculum & Instruction, Dr. Monty Noblitt
- Assistant Superintendent of Support, Chris LeBatard

== Notable alumni ==
- Manly Barton – American politician, member of the Mississippi House of Representatives
- Elley Duhé – American singer
- Chris White — NFL linebacker, Super Bowl XLIX champion with the New England Patriots
