= Jean Baptiste Baudreau II =

French Louisiana colonist executed in 1757

- Born: c. 1717; Dauphin Island, AL
- Died: June 7, 1757 (aged 40); Place d'Armes, New Orleans, LA
- Occupations: Colonial trader, interpreter, militia leader, and diplomat
- Years active: 1740-1757
- Known for: Colonial diplomacy, Choctaw militia leadership, royal pardon, unjust execution.

Jean Baptiste Baudreau Dit Graveline II (c. 1717– June 7, 1757) was a French colonial trader, diplomat, and militia leader in Louisiana. He was known for his role in leading Choctaw auxiliaries during conflicts in the 1740s, his escape from imprisonment, and receiving a royal pardon from King Louis XV. He was ultimately executed by breaking wheel, one of the few individuals in the Americas to suffer this form of capital punishment.

== Early life ==
Jean Baptiste Baudreau Dit Graveline II was born c. 1717, on the French Louisiana settlement of Massacre Island, modern day Dauphin Island, Alabama. He was the son of Sieur Jean Baptiste Baudreau Dit Graveline, the captain of the Pascagoula militia, and the first settler of Pascagoula, Mississippi, and one of the original settlers of the old Mobile.

His mother, Susanne, was an American Indian woman described in historical records as 'the daughter of a great chief of the Indian nation,' a phrase historians today believe likely refers to the Choctaw, given Baudreau's later intimate relationship with the Choctaw Nation. Having originally been born as an illegitimate child, his father married Susanne in 1727 in an attempt to legitimize him. In 1734, Baudreau married Marie Catherine Viconneau, a Protestant, with whom he had all of his legitimate children.

== Conflicts with the French authorities and execution in New Orleans ==
During the course of his life, he had problems with French authorities and was imprisoned several times. Despite his warm relations with Bienville, he was regarded with suspicion by some French authorities, because of his unique relationship with the local Native American population, due in large part because of his half Indian heritage. At the same time, he was a vital part of the French colonial operation, as he was often the one who was sent on trading excursions into Creek territory.

In the 1740s, he was imprisoned by French authorities on kidnapping charges related to an excursion he took to Havana, Cuba. He broke out of prison and took refuge in Native American villages north of Mobile. The Native Americans refused to engage in any further trade with the French until he was pardoned. Governor Vandrieul petitioned for King Louis XV to drop the charges, which he did.

In the 1750s, Baudreau was imprisoned at the French prison on modern day Cat Island, Mississippi for charges of illegally salvaging wrecked ships. In 1757, soldiers stationed at the prison staged a mutiny and killed the commanding officer. They took Baudreau hostage and forced him to be their guide, as they went into the hinterlands away from the colony. The mutineers provided Baudreau with a signed certificate saying he had not been a party to the mutiny.

Despite this, Governor Kerlerec had him court martialed and he was sentenced to death. He was executed by breaking wheel in front of the St. Louis Cathedral in New Orleans, Louisiana on June 7, 1757. The French authorities mutilated what were left of his remains and deposited them in the Mississippi River. A marker commemorating his life and brutal execution stands near the site.

== Legacy ==
Urbain Baudreau Dit Graveline Park in Montreal, Quebec was named for Baudreau's grandfather, who was an important figure in the history of Quebec. Graveline Bay, which borders southern Mississippi and southern Alabama, is named for his father.

Baudreau's affair with Marie Henriette Huet served as the basis for the book "The Passion of the Princes" by author Eloise Genest.

Baudreau was the 6th great-grandfather of singer and songwriter Jimmy Buffett, the 6th great-grandfather of actress Diane Ladd, 7th great-grandfather of actress Laura Dern, and the 5th great-grandfather of Mobile, Alabama cook, socialite, and television personality Connie Bea Hope.

=== Memorial march and historical marker ===
In June 2007, a memorial funeral march and celebration for Baudrau was held in New Orleans, 250 years after his execution. Descendants gathered to honor his life and symbolically lay his soul to rest. A documentary of the event was created by Nelson and Guy Hague of Pascagoula, Mississippi. Fourteen years later, descendants, including members of the Vancleave Live Oak Choctaw, later gathered to erect a historical marker in his honor. In February 2022, after raising funds for research, casting, and installation, the marker was erected and dedicated by the Live Oak Choctaw near Jackson Square in New Orleans, commemorating Jean Baptiste Baudrau II's life and execution.

== See also ==
- Choctaw
- Vancleave Live Oak Choctaw
- Louisiana Creoles
