= Breaking wheel =

Torture device used for capital punishment

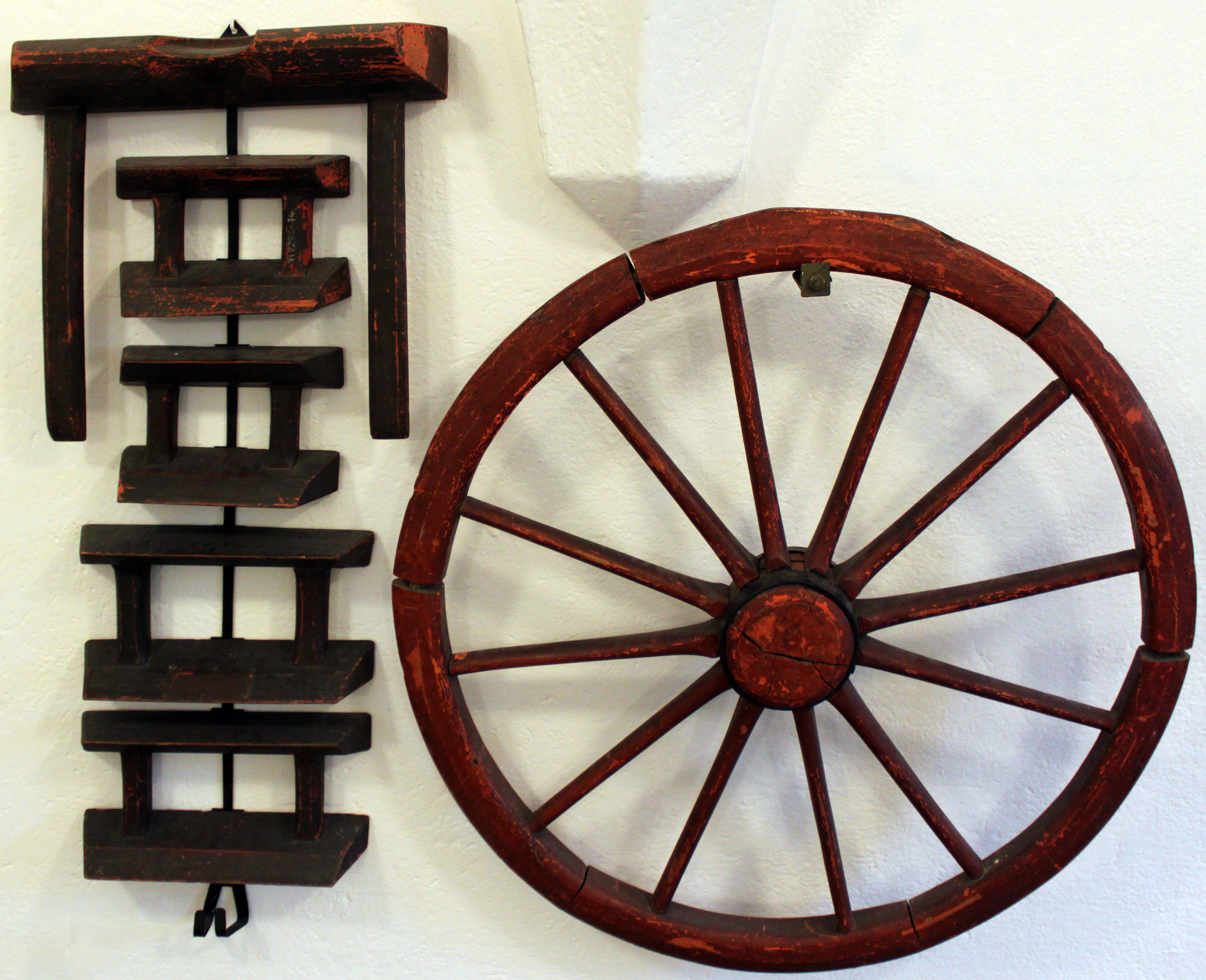
Execution wheel (German: Richtrad) with underlays, 18th century; on display at the Märkisches Museum, Berlin

The breaking wheel, also known as the execution wheel, the Wheel of Catherine or the (Saint) Catherine('s) Wheel, was a torture method used for public execution primarily in Europe from antiquity through the Middle Ages up to the 19th century by breaking the bones of a criminal or bludgeoning them to death. The practice was abolished in Bavaria in 1813 and in the Electorate of Hesse in 1836: the last known execution by the "Wheel" took place in Prussia in 1841. In the Holy Roman Empire, it was a "mirror punishment" for highwaymen and street thieves, and was set out in the Sachsenspiegel for murder, and arson that resulted in fatalities.

== Punishment ==
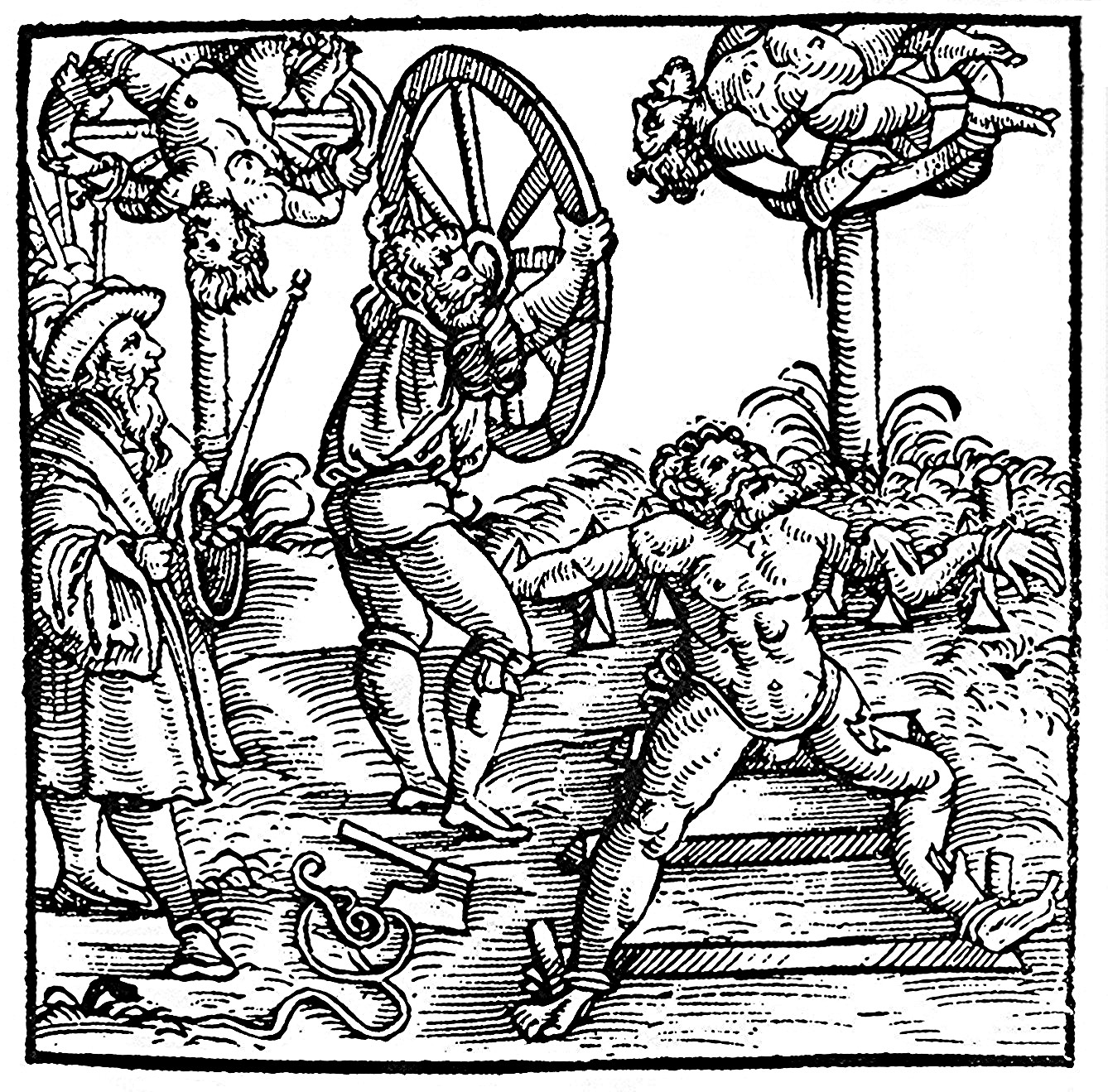
Illustration of execution by wheel (Augsburg, Bavaria, 1586): Classic example of the "breaking wheel" punishment, with wheel crucifixions in the background

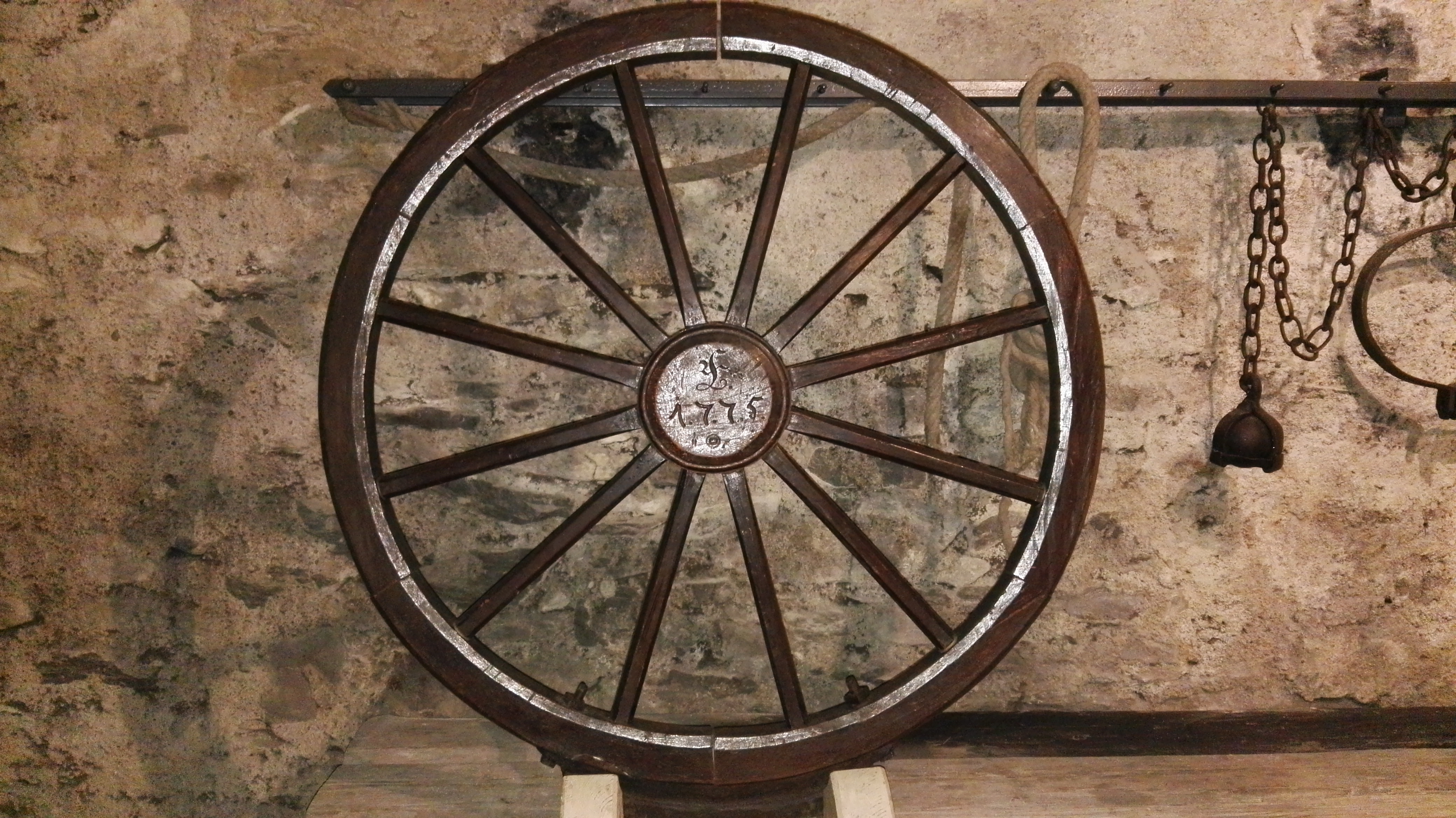
An execution wheel exhibited in the Museum of Cultural History Franziskanerkloster in Zittau, Saxony, Germany, dated 1775; bolted to the lower rim edge is an iron blade-like thrust attachment

Those convicted as murderers, rapists, traitors or robbers were to be executed by the wheel, sometimes termed to be "wheeled" or "broken on the wheel", would be taken to a public stage scaffold site and tied to the floor. The execution wheel was typically a large wooden spoked wheel, the same as was used on wooden transport carts and carriages (often with an iron rim), sometimes purposely modified with a rectangular iron thrust attached and extending blade-like from part of the rim. The primary goal of the first act was the agonizing mutilation of the body, not death. Therefore, the most common form would start with breaking the leg bones. To this end, the executioner dropped the execution wheel on the shinbones of the convicted person and then worked his way up to the arms. Here, rhythm and number of beatings were prescribed in each case, sometimes also the number of spokes on the wheel. To increase its effect, often sharp-edged timbers were placed under the convict's joints. Later, there were devices in which the convicted person could be "harnessed". Although not commonplace, the executioner could be instructed to execute the convicted person at the end of the first act, by aiming for the neck or heart in a "coup de grâce". Even less often, this occurred immediately from the start (from the head down).

In the second act, the body was braided into another wooden spoked wheel, which was possible through the broken limbs, or tied to the wheel. The wheel was then erected on a mast or pole, like a crucifixion. After this, the executioner was permitted to decapitate or garrotte the convicted if need be. Alternatively, fire was kindled under the wheel, or the "wheeled" convict was simply thrown into a fire. Occasionally, a small gallows was set up on the wheel, for example, if there were a guilty verdict for theft in addition to murder.

Since the body remained on the wheel after execution, left to scavenging animals, birds and decay, this form of punishment, like the ancient crucifixion, had a sacral function beyond death: according to the belief at that time, this would hinder transition from death to resurrection.

If the convict fell from the wheel still alive or the execution failed in some other way, such as the wheel itself breaking or falling from its placement, it was interpreted as God's intervention. There exist votive images of saved victims of the wheel, and there is literature on how best to treat such sustained injuries.

The survival time after being "wheeled" or "broken" could be extensive. Accounts exist of a 14th-century murderer who remained conscious for three days after undergoing the breaking wheel. In 1348, during the time of the Black Death, a Jewish man named Bona Dies underwent the punishment. The authorities stated he remained conscious for four days and nights afterwards. In 1581, the German serial killer Christman Genipperteinga remained conscious for nine days on the breaking wheel before expiring, having been deliberately kept alive with "strong drink".

Alternatively, the condemned were spreadeagled and broken on a saltire, a cross consisting of two wooden beams nailed in an "X" shape, after which the victim's mangled body might be displayed on the wheel.

== History ==
=== Possible Frankish origins ===
Historian Pieter Spierenburg mentions a reference in sixth-century author Gregory of Tours as a possible origin for the punishment of breaking someone on the wheel. In Gregory's time, a criminal could be placed in a deep track, and then a heavily laden wagon was driven over him. Thus, the latter practice could be seen as a symbolic re-enactment of the previous penalty in which people were literally driven over by a wagon.

=== France ===
In France, the condemned were placed on a cartwheel with their limbs stretched out along the spokes over two sturdy wooden beams. The wheel was made to revolve slowly, and a large hammer or an iron bar was then applied to the limb over the gap between the beams, breaking the bones. This process was repeated several times per limb. Sometimes it was "mercifully" ordered that the executioner should strike the condemned on the chest and abdomen, blows known as coups de grâce (French: "blows of mercy"), which caused fatal injuries. Without those, the broken man could last hours and even days, during which birds could peck at the helpless victim. Eventually, shock and dehydration caused death. In France, a special grace, the retentum, could be granted, by which the condemned was strangled after the second or third blow, or in special cases, even before the breaking began.

=== Holy Roman Empire ===
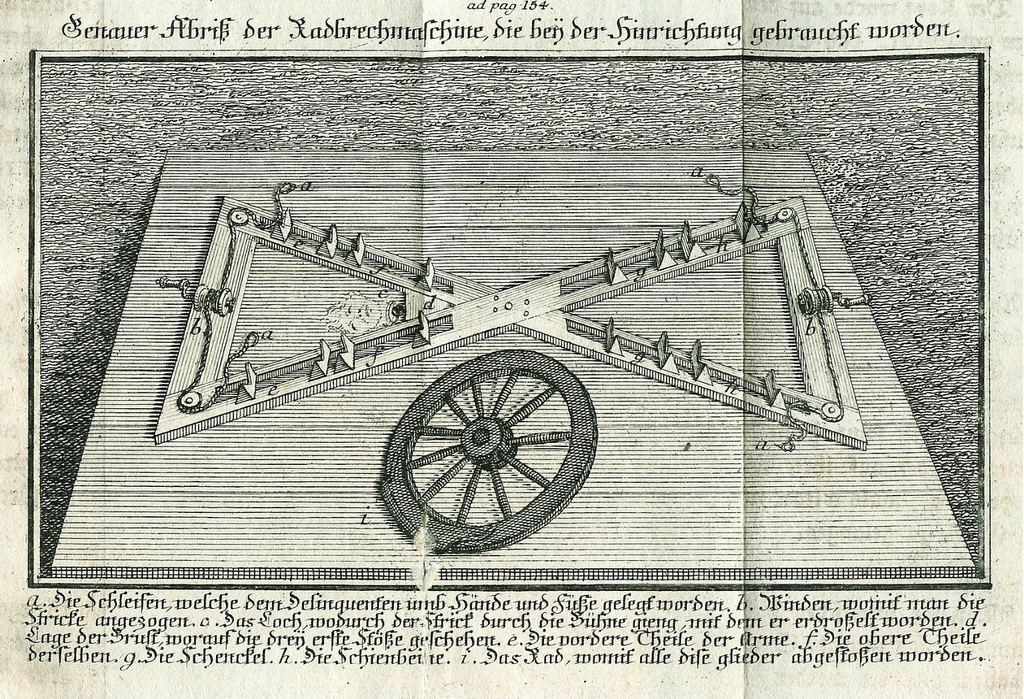
Breaking-wheel machine used to execute Matthias Klostermayr, Bavaria, 1772

In the Holy Roman Empire, the wheel was punishment reserved primarily for men convicted of aggravated murder (murder committed during another crime, or against a family member). Less severe offenders would be cudgelled "top down", with a lethal first blow to the neck. More heinous criminals were punished "bottom up", starting with the legs, and sometimes being beaten for hours. The number and sequence of blows was specified in the court's sentence; for example, in 1581, the serial killer Peter Niers was found guilty of 544 murders and after two days of extended torture, given 42 strikes with the wheel, then quartered alive. Corpses were left for carrion-eaters, and the criminals' heads often placed on a spike.

The Zürcher Blutgerichtsordnung (Procedures for the Blood Court in Zürich) dates from the 15th century and contains a detailed description of how the breaking on the wheel shall occur: Firstly, the delinquent is placed belly down, bound hands and feet outstretched to a board, and thus dragged by a horse to the place of execution. The wheel is then slammed twice onto each arm, one blow above the elbow, the other below. Then, each leg gets the same treatment, above and below the knees. The final ninth blow is given at the middle of the spine, so that it breaks. Then, the broken body is woven onto the wheel (i.e., between the spokes), and the wheel is then hammered onto a pole, which is then fastened upright with its other end in the ground. The criminal is then to be left dying "afloat" on the wheel and be left to rot.

==== Dolle case; unclear case ====
On 1 October 1786, in the County of Tecklenburg, Heinrich Dolle was to be executed by being broken on the wheel, on account of the aggravated murder of a Jew. The court had decided that Dolle should be broken von oben herab: the first stroke of the wheel should crush his chest (traditionally thought to kill him instantly). The court instructed the executioner, a certain Essmeyer, should clandestinely strangle Dolle (by garrotte) prior to the first stroke. The bystanders were shocked by what they thought was a severely botched execution by Essmeyer and his son, and thought Dolle had been alive during the entire proceeding and also after Essmeyer had secured Dolle onto the wheel and raised it on a pole. The town physician climbed up on a ladder (the Essmeyers had gone by then) and ascertained that Dolle was indeed alive; he died six hours later.

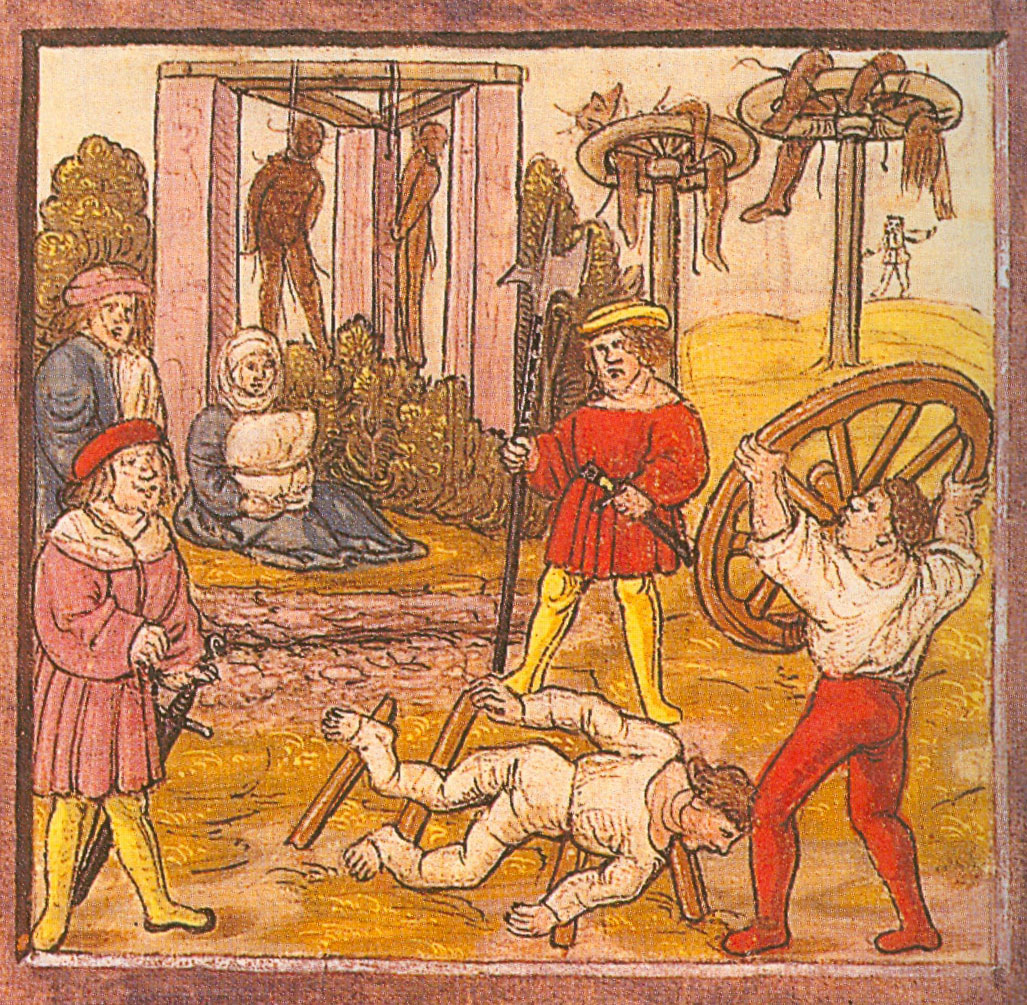
Illustration of an execution by wheel, Switzerland, 1513

The Essmeyers were taken to court for severe malpractice. It was established that the string around Dolle's neck had not been drawn tightly enough, and that Essmeyer had, contrary to his duties as an executioner, used a wheel that was not heavy enough. The inadequate weight meant that Dolle’s chest had not been crushed. Furthermore, one of Dolle's arms and one of his legs had not broken according to proper penal procedure.

Many believed Essmeyer's malpractice had been not so much a display of gross incompetence as a deliberate act of cruelty, because just prior to his execution Dolle had converted to the Reformed Faith, and Essmeyer was a devout Catholic. The court did not find sufficient evidence for deliberate malice on Essmeyer's part, but sentenced him to two years' hard labour and barred him permanently from working as an executioner. His young son was, on grounds of mercy, acquitted of any culpable wrongdoings.

=== Indian subcontinent ===
A long struggle between the Sikh community and Islamic rulers resulted in the execution of Sikhs. In 1746, Bhai Subeg Singh and Bhai Shahbaz Singh were executed on rotating wheels.

=== Scotland ===
In Scotland, a servant named Robert Weir was broken on the wheel at Edinburgh in 1603 or 1604 (sources disagree). This punishment had been used infrequently there. The crime had been the murder of John Kincaid, Lord of Warriston, on behalf of his wife, Jean Kincaid. Weir was secured to a cart wheel and was struck and broken with the coulter of a plough. Lady Warriston was later beheaded.

=== Colonial United States ===
In New York, at least one slave was executed on the breaking wheel following his involvement in a failed slave rebellion in 1712. Between 1730 and 1754, eleven slaves in French Louisiana, who had either killed, assaulted or escaped from their masters, were killed via the breaking wheel. On 7 June 1757, the French colonist Jean Baptiste Baudreau dit Graveline II was executed on a breaking wheel in front of the St. Louis Cathedral in New Orleans, Louisiana by the French colonial authorities.

=== Kingdom of Hungary ===
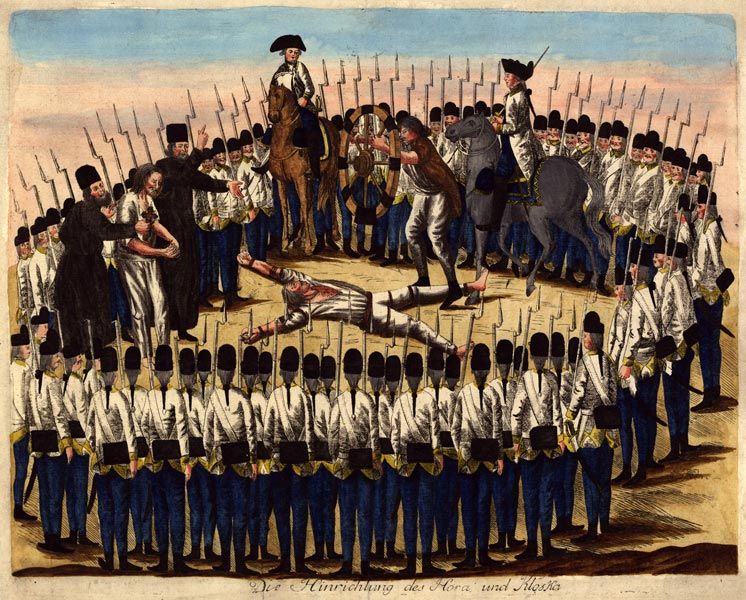
The execution of the rebel leaders in Transylvania, Kingdom of Hungary, 1785

At the end of the Revolt of Horea, Cloșca and Crișan, in 1785 (in the Hungarian Principality of Transylvania (1711–1867)), two of the revolt leaders, Horea and Cloșca, were sentenced to be executed by the breaking wheel. Crișan hanged himself in prison before that sentence could be carried out. According to a book published the same year by Adam F. Geisler, the two leaders were broken "von unten auf", from bottom up, meaning the lower limbs were broken before the upper limbs, prolonging the torture.

=== Russia ===
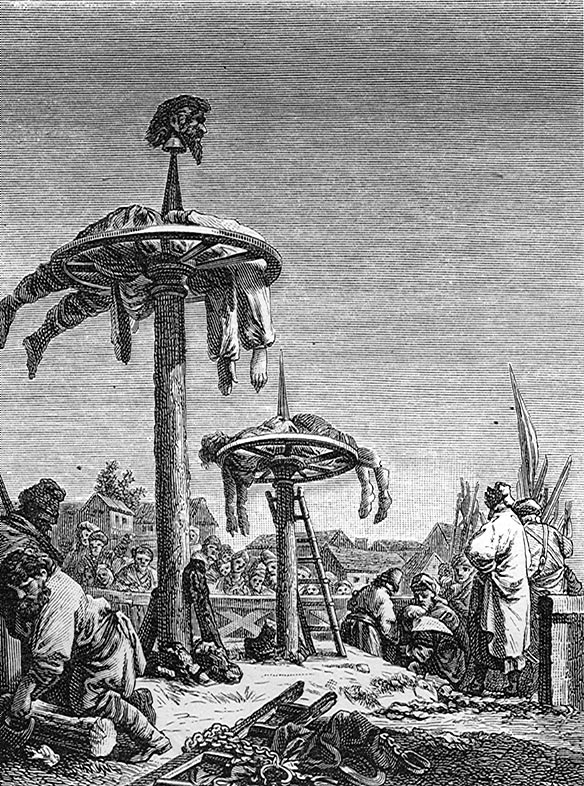
Executions of Cossacks by Russian troops in Baturyn or Lebedyn, 1708–1709

The breaking wheel was frequently used in the Great Northern War in the early 1700s.

=== Sweden ===
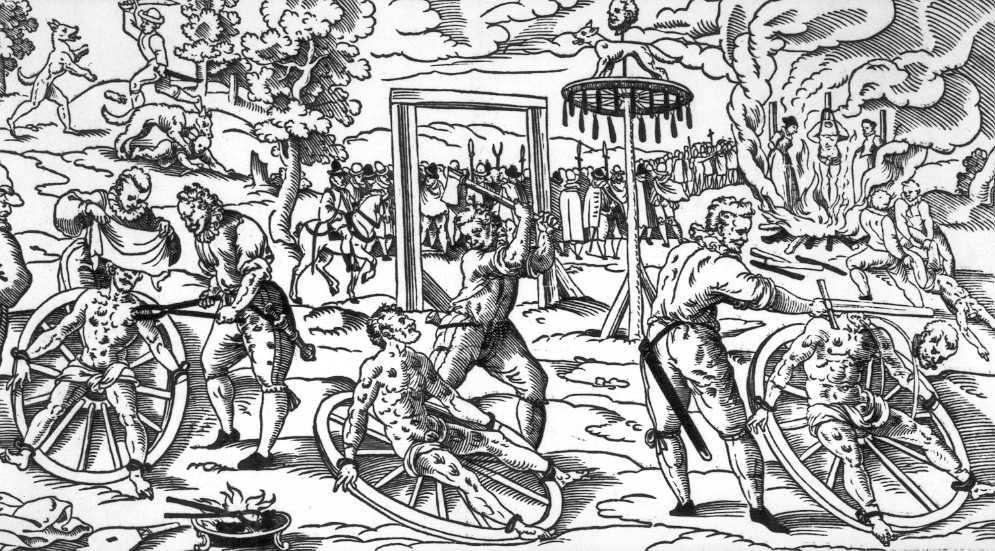
The execution of Peter Stumpp, involving the breaking wheel in use in Cologne in the early modern period

Johann Patkul was a Livonian gentleman who was condemned on charges of treason by Swedish king Charles XII in 1707. The priest Lorentz Hagen was a friend of Patkul's and described the horrors his friend had to endure when Patkul was condemned to be broken on the wheel:

Here the executioner gave him the first stroke. His cries were terrible. "O Jesus! Jesus, have mercy upon me!" This cruel scene was much lengthened out, and of the utmost horror; for as the headsman had no skill in his business, the wretch under his hands received upwards of fifteen blows, with each of which were intermixed the most piteous groans, and invocations of the name of God. At length, after two strokes given on the breast, his strength and voice failed him. In a faltering dying tone, he was just heard to say, "Cut off my head!" and the executioner still lingering, he himself placed his head on the scaffold: in a word, after four strokes with a hatchet, the head was separated from the body, and the body quartered. Such was the end of the renowned Patkul: and may God have mercy on his soul!

=== Later use ===
The breaking wheel was used as a form of execution in Germany as recently as the early 19th century. Its use as a method of execution was not fully abolished in Bavaria until 1813, and still in use until 1836 in Hesse-Kassel. In Prussia, the punishment of death was inflicted by decapitation with a large sword, by burning, and by breaking on the wheel. At the time, the Prussian penal code required a criminal to be broken upon the wheel when a particularly heinous crime had been committed. The king always issued an order to the executioner to strangle the criminal (which was done by a small cord not easily seen) before his limbs were broken. The last execution by this stronger form of capital punishment, of Rudolf Kühnapfel, was on 13 August 1841.

== Archaeology ==
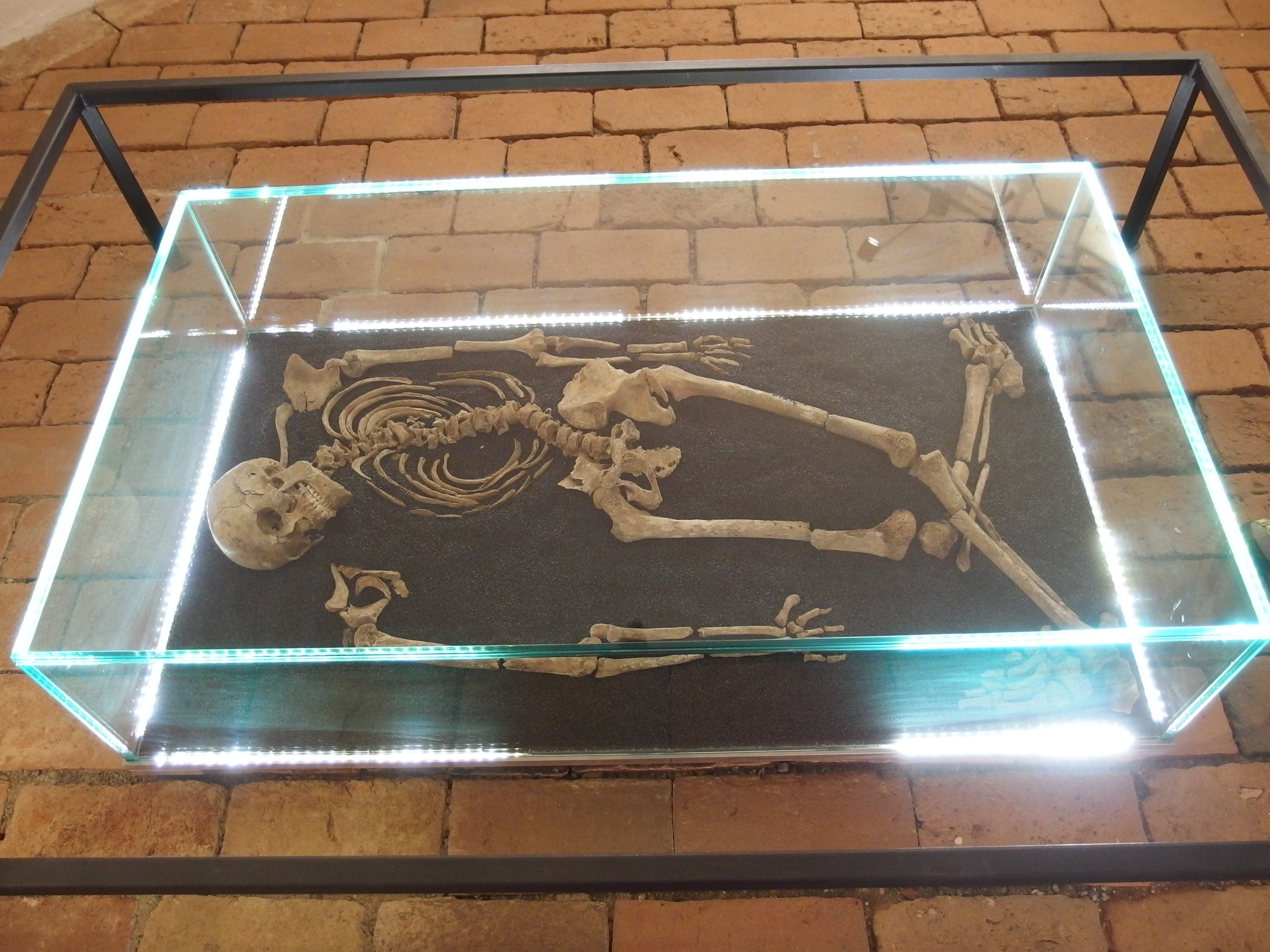
Skeletal remains of a man executed by "breaking wheel", aged about 25 to 30 years, from the 16th to 18th century. Discovered in 2014, in the place of execution Pöls-Oberkurzheim (Styria), Austria. The skeleton is displayed at Riegersburg Castle in Austria.

Since victims' bodies of the breaking wheel were often left exposed to environmental influences over a long period of time, hardly any archaeological features for the "breaking wheel" exist; as a deterrence, the bodies were often left on public display over many years, exposed to wind and weather, birds and other scavenging animals could also take away the remains and bones. In the German-speaking areas, only a few archaeological discoveries of breaking wheel victims have been documented. In autumn 2013, the skeleton of a man was found in Groß Pankow, Germany, during the laying of Federal Highway 189 (Bundesstraße 189) between Perleberg and Pritzwalk in Brandenburg, whose position and signs of injury indicate death by the "breaking wheel". Based on an iron belt buckle, the skeleton was dated to the 15th to 17th centuries. The identity of the man is unknown. A similar archaeological find has since also been discovered in 2014, in Pöls-Oberkurzheim, Styria, Austria.

== Metaphorical uses ==
The breaking wheel was also known as a great dishonor, and appeared in several expressions as such. In Dutch, there is the expression opgroeien voor galg en rad, "to grow up for the gallows and wheel", meaning to be destined to come to no good. It is also mentioned in the Chilean expression morir en la rueda, "to die on the wheel", meaning to keep silent about something. The Dutch expression ik ben geradbraakt, literally "I have been broken on the wheel", is used to describe physical exhaustion and pain, like the German expression sich gerädert fühlen, "to feel wheeled", and the Danish expression radbrækket refers almost exclusively to physical exhaustion and great discomfort.

In Finnish teilata, "to execute by the wheel", refers to forceful and violent critique or rejection of performance, ideas or innovations. The German verb radebrechen ("to break on the wheel") can refer to speaking incorrectly, for example with a strong foreign accent or with a great deal of foreign vocabulary. Similarly, the Norwegian radbrekke can be applied to art and language, and refers to use which is seen as despoiling tradition and courtesy, with connotations of willful ignorance or malice. In Swedish, rådbråka can be used in the same sense as the English idiom "rack one's brain" or, as in German, to mangle language.

The word roué, meaning a debauched or lecherous person, is French, and its original meaning was "broken on the wheel". As execution by breaking on the wheel in France and some other countries was reserved for crimes of particular atrocity, roué came by a natural process to be understood to mean a man morally worse than a "gallows-bird", a criminal who only deserved hanging for common crimes. He was also a leader in wickedness, since the chief of a gang of brigands (for instance) would be broken on the wheel, while his obscure followers were merely hanged. Philip, Duke of Orléans, who was regent of France from 1715 to 1723, gave the term the sense of impious and callous debauchee, which it has borne since his time, by habitually applying it to the very bad male company who amused his privacy and his leisure. The locus classicus for the origin of this use of the epithet is in the Memoirs of Saint-Simon.

Another French expression is rouer de coups, which means giving a severe beating to someone.

In English, the quotation "Who breaks a butterfly upon a wheel?" from Alexander Pope's "Epistle to Dr Arbuthnot" is occasionally seen, referring to putting great effort into achieving something minor or unimportant.

== Execution of St Catherine ==
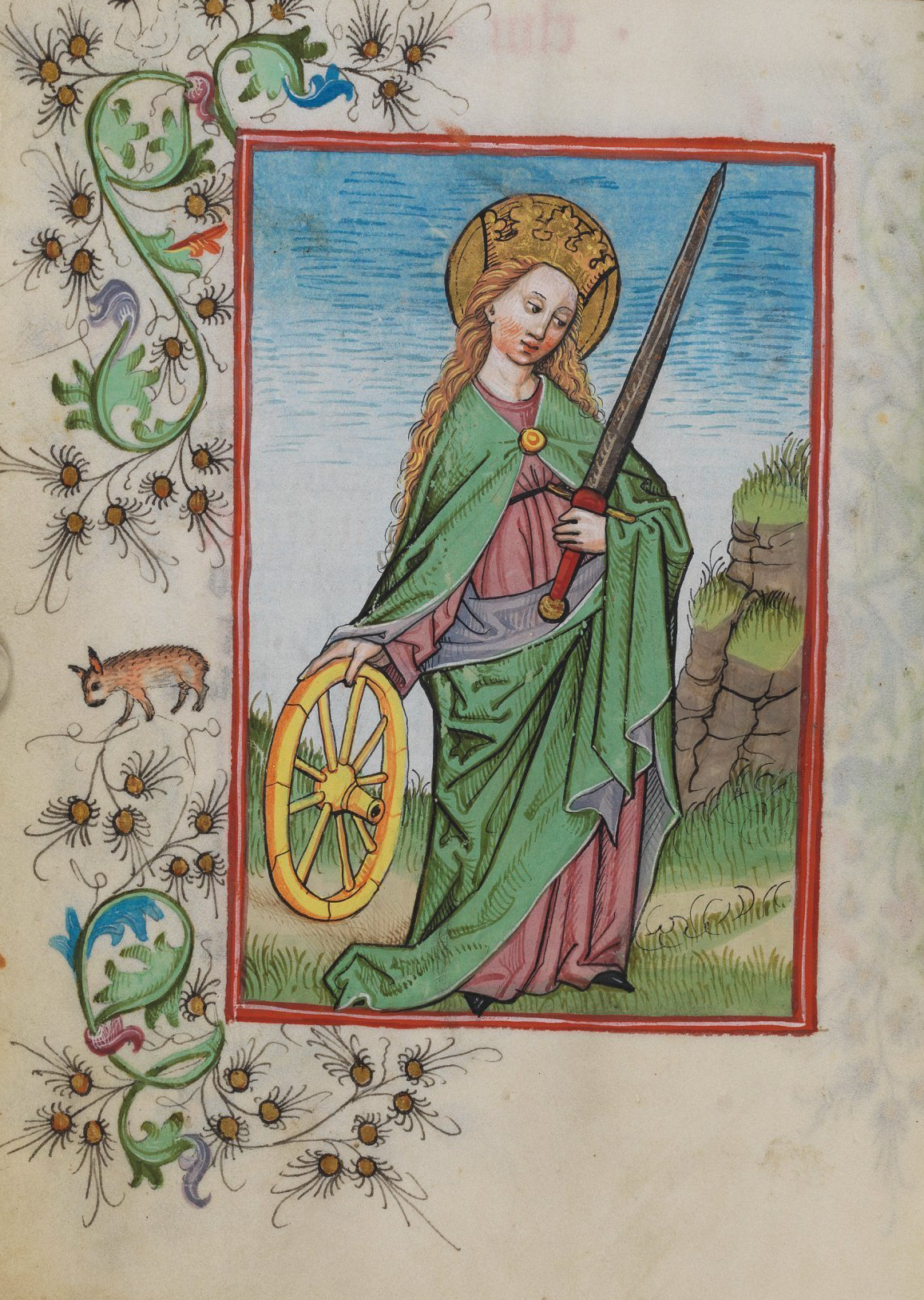
Saint Catherine of Alexandria with a wheel as her attribute

Medieval hagiographies, such as the Legenda sanctorum, record that St. Catherine of Alexandria was sentenced to be executed on one of these devices for refusing to renounce her Christian belief, which thereafter became known as the Catherine wheel, also used as her iconographic attribute. It is said the wheel miraculously broke when she touched it; she was then beheaded. As an attribute, it is usually shown broken in a small version beside her, or sometimes as a miniature she holds in her hand; the sword then used is also often shown.

=== Coats of arms with Catherine Wheels ===
The college shield of St Catherine's College, Oxford, depicting four breaking wheels

==== Persons ====
- Thomas de Brantingham
- Katherine Swynford

==== Organizations ====
- St Catharine's College, Cambridge
- St Catherine's College, Oxford
- University of Santo Tomas Faculty of Philosophy
- Worshipful Company of Turners
- Federal University of Santa Catarina
- St. Catherine University

==== Places ====
- Altena, Germany
- Dzierzgoń, Poland
- Garching bei München, Germany
- Goa, India, during Portuguese possession
- Hjørring, Denmark, where Saint Catherine is the patron-saint of the Town.
- Kaarina, Finland, until 2009 and Piikkiö's union with Kaarina
- Kremnica, Slovakia
- Kuldīga, Latvia
- Molsheim, France
- Niedererbach, Germany
- Prien am Chiemsee, Germany, where Saint Catherine is the patron saint of the town
- Sinaai, Belgium
- Wachtebeke, Belgium
- Catalina Island, United States
- Santa Catarina, Brazil

== Gallery ==
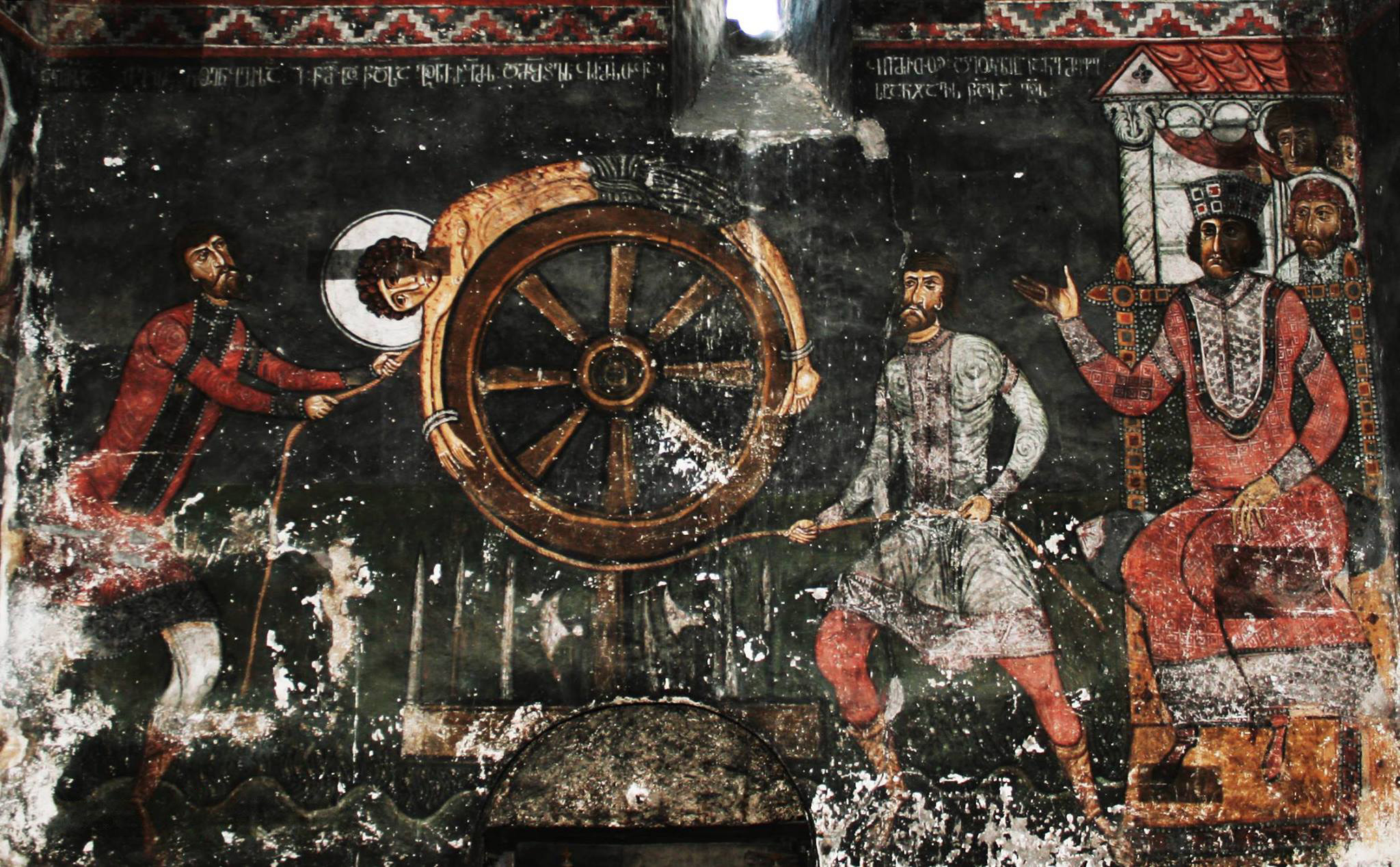

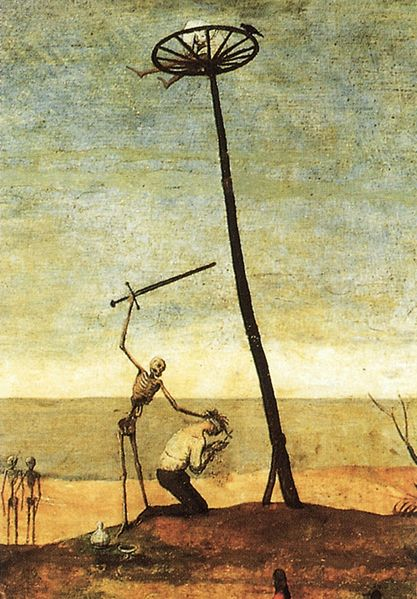

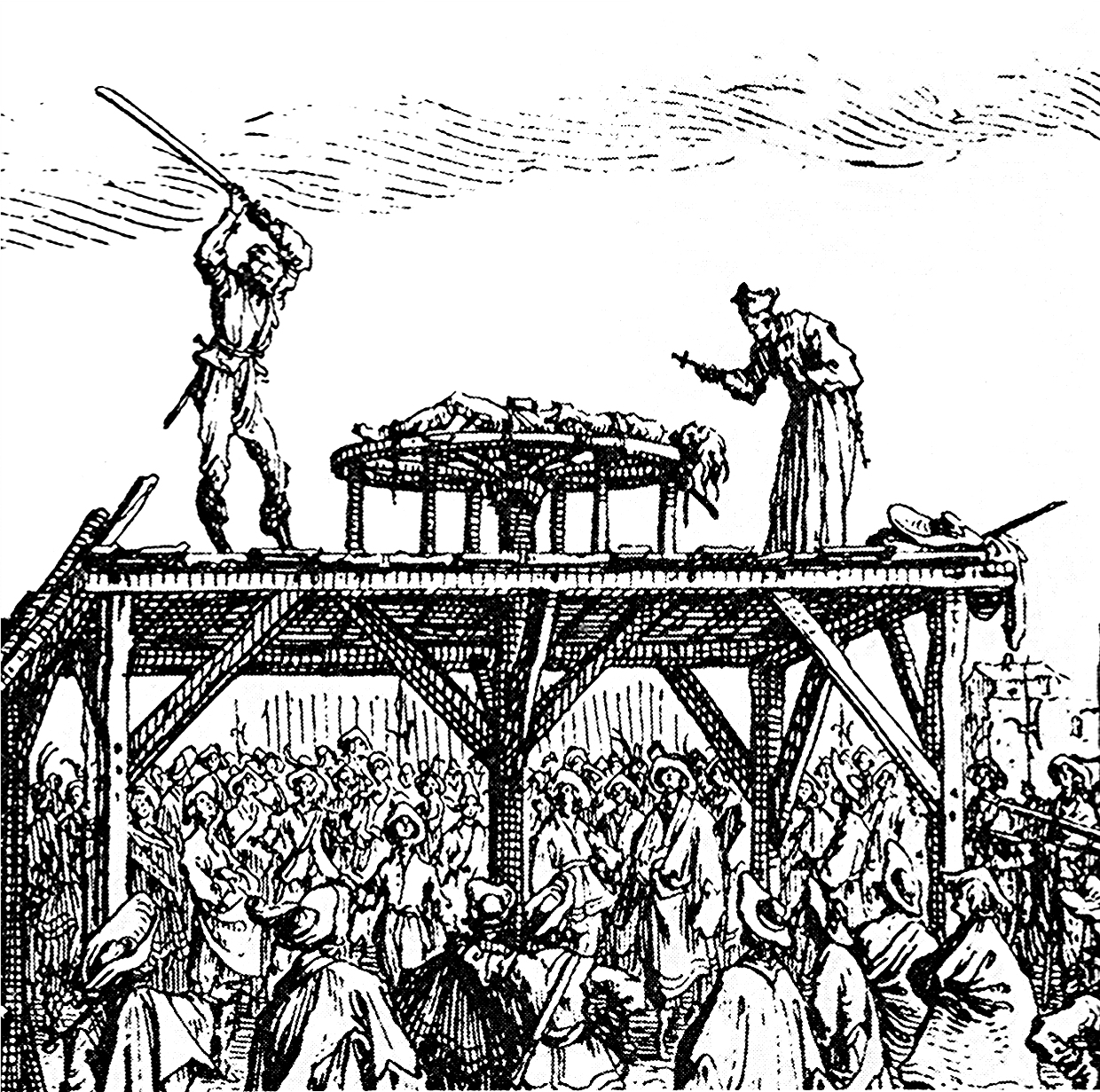

Torture of Saint George on the wheel. A fresco from Nakipari, Georgia, 1130, by Tevdore.

The Triumph of Death (detail), by Pieter Brueghel the Elder, ca. 1562–1563

Detail from no. 11, Les Grandes Misères de la guerre, Jacques Callot, 1633

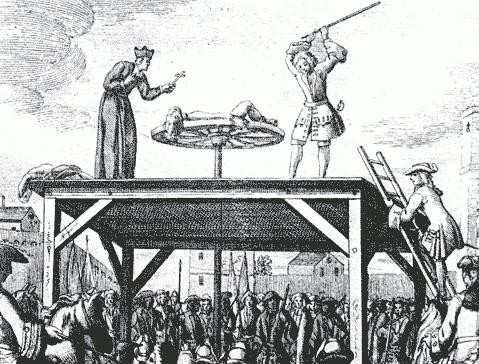

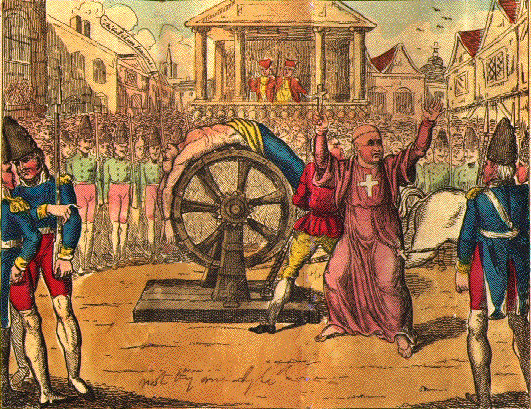

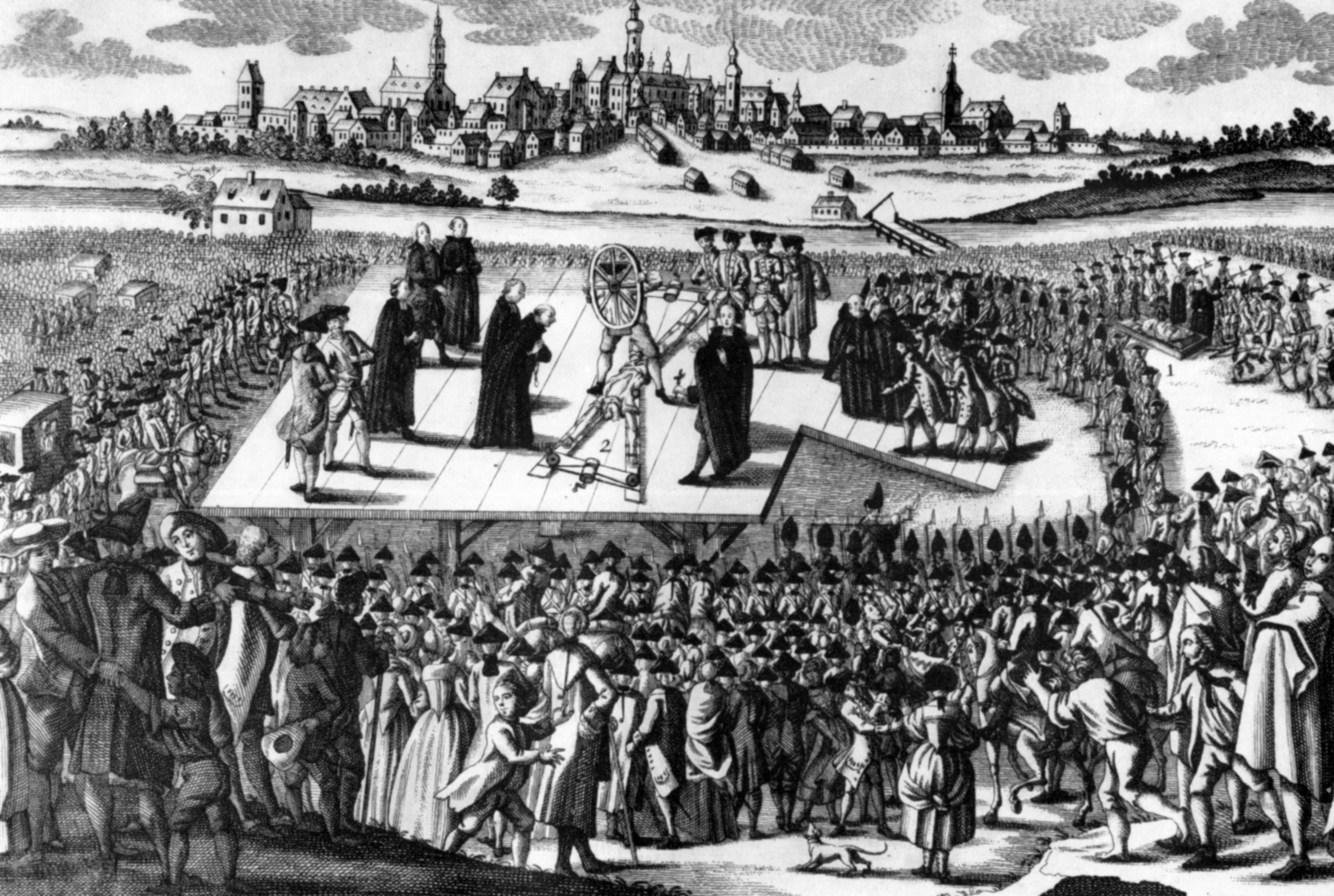

The execution of Louis Dominique Cartouche, 1721

The death of Jean Calas, Toulouse, 1762

The execution of Matthias Klostermayr, 1771

St Catherine breaking wheel symbol

Catherine wheel cross

Coat of Arms of Kremnica, Slovakia, displaying the broken Catherine wheel

Coat of arms of Kuldīga, Latvia

== See also ==
- Outline of capital punishment
- Dismemberment
- Torture
- Capital punishment
- Mazzatello
- Crucifixion
