= Peter Niers =

German serial killer (c. 1540–1581)

- Born: c. 1540
- Died: 16 September 1581; Neumarkt in der Oberpfalz
- Cause of death: Execution
- Other names: Peter Nirsch, Peter Niersch, Peter Nyers, Peter Nyersch
- Penalty: Broken on the wheel, then quartered while still alive

Details
- Victims: 544 (according to confessions extracted under torture)
- Span of crimes: c. 1566 – 1581
- Country: The Palatinate, Holy Roman Empire
- Date apprehended: September 1581

Peter Niers (c. 1540 – 16 September 1581; also spelled Niersch) was an alleged German serial killer and bandit who was executed on 16 September 1581 in Neumarkt in der Oberpfalz, some 40 km from Nuremberg. Based on confessions extracted from him and his accomplices under torture, Niers was convicted of 544 murders, including 24 fetuses cut out of pregnant women—allegedly, the fetal remains were to be used in magical rituals and for acts of cannibalism.

Information about Niers is based on contemporary ballads, "true crime" reports and official warrants circulating, as well as the aforementioned confessions. Because the confessions were made under torture, it is unclear how much truth there was in them and how many (if any) people he actually killed.

== Modus operandi ==
Peter Niers was one of several leading figures in a loosely knit network of violent, murderous bandits roaming the German countryside. At times, groups of bandits would join forces for a major raid; at other times, smaller groups (or even pairs) could pillage, steal and kill on a localised scale, or over different areas. Historian Joy Wiltenburg writes:

Of course the profession of robbery required some roving, whether the principals had been itinerant beforehand or not. It was in the spaces outside cities that these bands operated, particularly in woods and mountains and along unfrequented roads. The gang led by Niers and Sumer reportedly started in Alsace, but after gathering a group of twenty-four (...) near Pfalzburg, they separated to rob and murder. Accordingly, they were caught in different places- one in the imperial city of Landau, one at Kirchweyler am Rhein; four at Strasbourg; nine at Pfalzburg; and six at Koblenz.

This mode of operation does not seem to have originated with the gang led by Niers and Sumer; apparently, Niers had a criminal mentor named Martin Stier, who, from the 1550s until his arrest and execution in 1572, had led a gang of 49 bandits (ostensibly working as shepherds), pillaging and killing their way from the Netherlands to Württemberg. Wiltenburg added that "Shepherds were widely regarded as dishonourable, especially in the thinking of urban guilds." She proffers an example of such thinking from a novel published in 1554, where the young antihero gradually slides down the social scale to that of a herdsman, and finally hits the bottom as a wandering minstrel: "Far from civilized society and alone with the animals, he has time to think over his misdeeds. Members of such a group were unsurprising suspects".

At the end of his career as a murderer (which spanned some fifteen years, according to a folk song), Niers was found guilty of having murdered 544 individuals, including 24 pregnant women and their fetuses, which he had allegedly excised from their wombs for acts of cannibalism and to use in rituals of supposed black magic.

== First arrest and escape ==
In 1577, some of the gang members were caught, including Niers himself. Monika Spicker-Beck, for example, notes that a Claus Strikker confessed in April that 10 years earlier he had worked together with Niers and helped him murder a 20-year-old woman in Gottswald. Also, an accomplice named Peter Oblath drew up a list of 14 gang members, including the name of Peter Niers. Joy Wiltenburg notes that Niers himself was arrested and tortured in Gersbach. There, he confessed to 75 acts of murder, but somehow managed to escape. Over the next few years, until his final arrest in 1581, a number of pamphlets, ballads, and stories were written and circulated detailing his cannibalism and mastery of the black arts. For example, it was said that when Niers and Sumer's gang gathered at Pfalzburg, they had a meeting with the Devil, who gave his blessing to the gang's ambitions, even providing Niers and Sumer with monthly pay along with granting supernatural powers to Niers. Even earlier than this, however, it seems that Niers learned how to become invisible from his mentor Martin Stier, and that the only reason he was finally caught was because he was deprived of his bag containing the magical materials to make himself invisible. A critical component of such magical material was thought to be the remains of fetuses; during the casting of the spell, the fetuses' hearts were eaten. Joy Wiltenburg mentions also another use of fetal black magic: To concoct the flesh and fats of infants into magic candles that, when lit, would allow them to rob houses without waking the inhabitants.

Peter Niers was credited with other supernatural powers as well, in particular the ability of physical transformation; various stories attributed him with the ability to change his shape into that of a log or a stone, but according to a late ballad, he could also become a goat, dog, or cat at will.

A contemporary account, however, suggests more mundanely that Peter Niers was a master of disguise: In a circulated warrant from 1579, based on confessions from his captured underlings, when Niers was thought to operate in the Schwarzwald area, it is stated that he frequently changed his appearance and costume, sometimes masquerading as a common soldier, at other times as a leper, and adopted other disguises. The same warrant states, however, that some things stayed constant: He always had much money in his possession, he carried two loaded pistols in his trousers, and carried a huge two-handed sword.

The folk song mentioned above has a few particulars on his physical appearance; he was described as "rather old," two of his fingers were crooked, and he had a long scar on his chin.

== Final arrest, torture and execution ==
A late ballad contains the circumstances under which Niers was discovered, leading to his arrest and execution. He arrived at Neumarkt, and lodged in an inn called "The Bells". A couple of days later he went to bathe at a public bathhouse, leaving behind his precious bag with magical materials to be kept safe by the innkeeper. At this time, Niers had achieved notoriety, and his physical appearance had circulated in warrants and pamphlets. One of those at the bathhouse, a cooper, recognized him, and gradually a mumbling and whispering spread among the bathhouse guests that the stranger might, indeed, be the wanted arch-killer. Niers himself was oblivious to the changing mood, and two citizens slipped out of the bathhouse and went to the inn. There, on request, the innkeeper gave them Niers' bag. They opened it, and it contained several severed hands and hearts from murdered fetuses. The townspeople reacted quickly, and a force of eight men was gathered that apprehended Niers. When he understood they had found out what he carried in his sack, he admitted to his identity, and that he was guilty, and confessed to his many murders.

Peter Niers was tortured and then executed over the course of three days in September 1581. On the first day, strips of flesh were torn from his body and heated oil was poured into his wounds. On the second day, his feet were smeared with heated oil and then held above glowing coal, thereby roasting him. On the third day, 16 September 1581, he was dragged to the place of execution and broken on the wheel; the wheel was slammed down upon him 42 times. Still alive, he was finally dismembered by quartering.

== See also ==
- Child cannibalism
- Christman Genipperteinga, a legendary bandit reputedly executed in 1581 for having killed 964 individuals
- List of serial killers before 1900
- List of German serial killers
