= Jacob L. Reddix =

American educator, university president (1897–1973)

Jacob Lorenzo Reddix

5th President of Jackson State University
- In office 1940–1967
- Preceded by: B. Baldwin Dansby
- Succeeded by: John A. Peoples Jr.

Personal details
- Born: March 2, 1897 Vancleave, Mississippi, U.S.
- Died: May 9, 1973 (aged 76) Jackson, Mississippi, U.S.
- Education: Lewis Institute, University of Chicago
- Occupation: Educator, academic administrator, memoirist, college president

Jacob Lorenzo Reddix (1897–1973) was an American educator, academic administrator, and memoirist. He was President of Mississippi Negro Training School (now Jackson State University) in Jackson, Mississippi, from 1940 until 1967. He was nicknamed "the Builder" for his support for new campus buildings at Jackson State College.

== Early life and education ==
Jacob Lorenzo Reddix was born on March 2, 1897, in Vancleave, Mississippi. He was the youngest of nine children, born to parents Nathan and Frances. His family was a mix of African, Cajun, and Creole heritage. His grandmother Millie Brown had been enslaved.

He attended Lewis Institute (now Illinois Institute of Technology) in Chicago, and he graduated in 1927. After college he worked as a schoolteacher and for the United States Postal Service, before starting graduate school at University of Chicago though a Rosenwald fellowship.

== Career ==
Reddix worked at the Farm Security Administration, a New Deal agency, where he focused his work on agricultural cooperatives. In 1932, Reddix founded the Gary Consumer Cooperative in Gary, Indiana.

He became the first president of Mississippi Negro Training School (now Jackson State University) after the school became a state-supported public institution, ending the school's many years of leadership by the American Baptist Home Mission Society of New York. The school was renamed Jackson College for Negro Teachers in 1944, and Jackson State College in 1956. Reddix did not support 1960s civil rights movement activism on campus, which drew criticism by students. In 1961, during the Tougaloo Nine protest on campus, Reddix was alleged to have assaulted two demonstrators and threatened to expel all of the students involved in protesting.

He was succeeded by John A. Peoples Jr. in 1967. In 1972, the school named its new student union building in his honor.

Reddix died on May 9, 1973, in Jackson, Mississippi.

== Publications ==
- Reddix, Jacob L. (1936). The Negro Seeks Economic Security Through Co-operation.
- Reddix, Jacob L. (1974). A Voice Crying in the Wilderness: The Memoirs of Jacob L. Reddix. University Press of Mississippi. ISBN 978-0878050246.
