= Christman Genipperteinga =

Alleged German serial killer (died c. 1581)

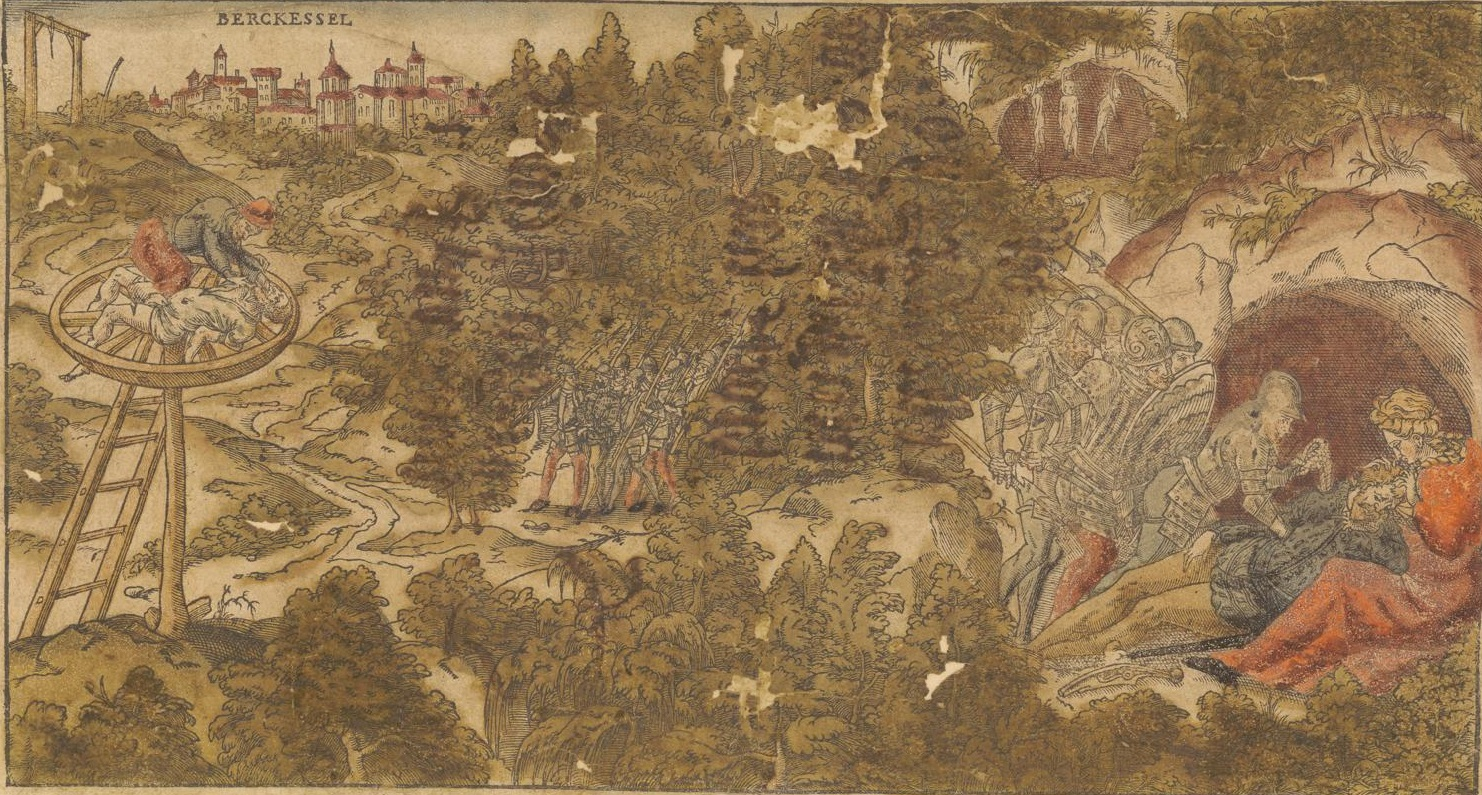
- 1598 woodcut of Genipperteinga's capture (right) and execution (left)
- Died: 26 June 1581
- Cause of death: Breaking on the wheel
- Children: 6
- Penalty: Death

Details
- Country: Spanish Netherlands; Holy Roman Empire
- Killed: 964

Christman Genipperteinga (died c. 26 June 1581) was a possibly fictitious German serial killer and bandit of the 16th century. He reportedly murdered 964 individuals over a 13-year period, from 1568 until his capture in 1581. Although records of Genipperteinga's alleged crimes first emerged shortly after his death, starting in 1581, historians are uncertain of Genipperteinga's existence. Similar tales of other serial-killing bandits were circulated in the Holy Roman Empire during and after his alleged life.

== Life and alleged crimes ==
The earliest known and most commonly cited account of Christmann Genipperteinga appeared in 1582, written by Caspar Herber, a resident of Lochem an der Mussel (Cochem) and printed by Caspar Behem in Mentz (Mainz).

Genipperteinga was born in Körpen (Kerpen), a town two German miles (c. 15 km) from Cologne. Around 1568, then still a youth, he began killing people as a bandit in Lützelburg (Luxembourg), then part of the Spanish Netherlands, and the area around Simeonstift Trier. Eight-and-a-half years prior to his execution, Genipperteinga settled near Bergkessel (Bernkastel), in a wooded upland area called Fraßberg. On a mountain, he took residence in a man-made mining cave, rumored to have been dug by dwarves. Genipperteinga discovered that the high position gave him a good view of the roads going to and from Lützburg, as well as those leading to or passing by Trier, Metz, Diedenhofen, Simmern im Hunsrück, Saarbrücken, Bad Kreuznach, Bacharach, and Zweibrücken. Genipperteiga furnished the cave, initially with bare necessities such as a bed and weapons, with the hide-out being described as a "fortification" by the time of his capture. As a highway robber, he attacked and killed travellers, targeting those who were alone or in small groups of up to five people, carrying back any valuables to the cave. He was reported to have committed mass murder and infanticide, with the bodies of his victims allegedly being thrown down a mine shaft connected with his cave complex.

Genipperteinga robbed a young female traveller from Boppert (Boppard), described as the daughter of a cooper on her way to visit her brother in Trier. Afterwards, he forced the woman to make vow of loyalty to him before abducting her and forcing her to accompany him to his cave. For the next seven years, the woman was kept as a sex slave, giving birth to six children, each of which was killed by Genipperteinga after delivery. She stated that Genipperteinga would break the newborn's neck and remove their heart, which he then ate, before hanging the bodies up to be moved around by the wind. Herber's account includes a line of verse alleged to have been said by Genipperteinga while watching the children's bodies flailing about:

"Tanzt liebe Kindlein tanzt, Gnipperteinga euer Vater macht euch den Tanz"
("Dance, dear little children, dance, Gnipperteinga your father is making the dance for you")

Genipperteinga also began frequenting marketplaces in nearby towns, hiring journeymen to deliver various goods to his cave, only to kill the men with poison and keep the items without paying. Whenever he was out, Genipperteinga chained the woman up to ensure she wouldn't flee.

On 27 May 1581, the hostage woman convinced her captor to let her visit Bergkessel, under the condition that she told no one where she was from and how she was. She wandered around inside Bergkessel, when she saw children playing in the streets and reminded of her own murdered offspring, she broke down in tears, attracting the attention of several townsfolk. The woman refused to tell anyone about her situation, stating she could only tell "God in his throne and this stone" she was sitting on. The mayor subsequently enlisted the help of two priests and other scholars, who successfully persuaded the woman to talk. Town officials told her to return to Genipperteinga, giving her sack of peas, both as food and to leave as a trail on the way back, followed by thirty armed soldiers. Outside the cave entrance, the woman lured Genipperteinga into the open, inviting him to sleep in her lap. Once he was in position, the soldiers captured Genipperteinga. He is alleged to have told his former prisoner either "You perjuring whore, this is the oath you swore to me?" or "Oh you disloyal traitress, had I known, I would have strangled you long ago".

A search of his cave found various stolen items in the form of wine, salted meat, suits of armour, weaponry, coins, and other valuables. The minimum value was estimated at 70,000 Gulden. While Herber's account stated that it was "uncertain" what would happen to both the loot and the now free woman, it was later reported that part of the loot was donated to charity for the poor and a hospital, while another part was given to the woman.

Chronicles assert that Genipperteinga kept a diary in which he detailed the murders of 964 individuals, as well as a tally of the loot gained from them. In addition to this evidence, he readily admitted to the murders, adding that if he had reached his goal of a thousand victims, he would have quit killing, abandoned dark magic and spent the rest of his life living off his ill-gotten wealth.

On 17 June 1581 Christman Genipperteinga was found guilty and condemned to death by breaking on the wheel. Allegedly, he survived nine days of torture before he perished and was kept conscious throughout with "strong drink" administered by his torturers each day.

== Historicity ==
Whether Genipperteinga actually existed remains uncertain. The sensational story is not attested to in contemporary local records, and the only accounts of his life come from a series of late 16th century pamphlets, all derivative from a 1581 publication by Caspar Herber of Cochem. No other publications of or references to Caspar Herber survive. Genipperteinga is one of the most prominent of a series of 16th-century German alleged serial killers, and his story shares attributes with those of a handful of other bandits. Genipperteinga's story entered local folklore, and was reprinted in altered forms on several occasions as late as the 19th century. Notably, compared to other 16th-century bandit's tales, depictions of supernatural abilities, contracts with the devil, and cannibalism are absent from the 1581 account of Genipperteinga, while claims of cannibalism appeared in some later versions of his life story. Similarly, it was claimed later that Genipperteinga was taught dark magic by Peter Nirsch, another possibly apocryphal bandit, having supposedly served as an apprentice to him for two years, and that both practiced rituals for the Devil, believing this would grant them invisibility during their crimes.

== See also ==
- Sawney Bean, contemporary possibly fictional Scottish bandit and cannibal
- List of serial killers before 1900

== Bibliography and further reading ==
- Adam, Daniel (1590). Kalendar Hystorycky. Prague: Daniel Adam.
- Archiv für Landeskunde (1859). Archiv für Landeskunde in den Grossherzogthümen Mecklenburg und Revüe der Landwirtschaft, Jahrgang 9. Schwerin: A.W. Sandmeyer.
- Bartsch, Karl (2012). Sagen und Märchen aus Mecklenburg. Jazzybee Verlag. ISBN 978-3-8496-0287-1.
- Becherer, Johann (1601). Newe Thüringische Chronica. Mülhausen: Johann Spiess.
- Breslau, Ralf (1997). Der Nachlass der Brüder Grimm: Teil 1. Wiesbaden: Otto Harrassowitz Verlag. ISBN 978-3-447-03857-7.
- Burghart, Gottfried H. (1736). Gothofr. Henr. Burgharti ... Iter sabothicum, das ist, Ausführliche Beschreibung einiger an. 1733 und die folgenden Jahre auf den Zothen-Berg gethanen Reisen: wodurch sowohl die natürliche als historische Beschaffenheit dieses in Schlesien so bekannten und berühmten Berges der Welt vor Augen geleget wird. Breslau, Leipzig: Michael Hubert.
- Deecke, Ernst (1857). Lübische Geschichten und Sagen. Lübeck: Dittmer'sche Buchhandlung.
- Flora (1820). Flora: Ein Unterhaltungs-Blatt. Munich.
- Freund, Marcus (1658). Zeit-und Wunder-Calender auff das Jahr 1658.
- Gregorii, Johann G. (1712). kuriose und gelehrte Historicus. Frankfurt and Leipzig: J. C. Stössel.
- Grässe, Johann G.T. (1868). Sagenbuch des preussischen Staats. 2 Bd, Volume 1. Glogau: Carl Flemming.
- Grässe, Johann G.T. (1871). Sagenbuch des preussischen Staats. 2 Bd, Volume 2. Glogau: Carl Flemming.
- Harderer, Klemens (1734). Seraphisch Buß- und Lob-anstimmendes Wald-Lerchlein, Das ist: Hundert Sonn- und Feyertags-Predigen an sowohl hoh- als niedere Stands-Persohnen, Stadt- und Dorffs-Leuth, volume 2. Augsburg: Veith, Gastel.
- Herber, Caspar (1581). Erschröckliche newe Zeytung Von einem Mörder Christman genant, welcher ist Gericht worden zu Bergkessel den 17. Juny diß 1581 Jars. Mainz: Caspar Herber.
- Hondorf, Andreas; Rivander, Zacharias (1581). Promptuarium Exemplorum: Darinnen viel Herrliche Schöne Historien Allerley alten vnd neuwen Exempel, Auch viel nützliche, merckliche vnd denckwirdige Geschichten, von Tugendt vnd Untugendt... Verfasset sind.... ¬Der ander Theil, Volume 2. Frankfurt am Main: Feyerabendt und Spieß.
- Hondorff, Andreas; Sturm, Vincenz (1587). Calendarium Sanctorum et historiarum. Frankfurt am Main: Nicholaus Basseus.
- Hondorff, Andreas; Sturm, Vincenz (1599). Calendarium Sanctorum et historiarum. Leipzig: Henning Gross.
- Janssen, Johannes; Christie, A.M. (tr.) (1907). History of the German people at the close of the Middle Ages, Volume 12. London: Kegan Paul, Trench, Trübner&Co, Ltd.
- Kessens, Bernd (2004). Die Räuber vom Mordkuhlenberg. Taurino. ISBN 978-3-9805800-9-0.
- Kirchschlager, Michael (2007). Menschliche Ungeheuer vom späten Mittelalter bis zum Ende des 19. Jahrhunderts (Historische Serienmörder. Bd. 1 = Bibliothek des Grauens Bd.6). Arnstadt: Kirchschlager. ISBN 978-3-934277-13-7.
- Klüver, Hans H. (1738). Beschreibung des Hertzogthums Mechlenburg und dazu gehöriger Ländar und Örter erster[-sechster] Theil ...:vormahls zusammen getragen von Hans Henrich Klüver, Volum 2. Hamburg: Thomas von Wieringe Erben.
- Kuhn, Adalbert; Schwartz, Wilhelm (1848). Norddeutsche Sagen, Märchen und Gebräuche aus Meklenburg, Pommern, der Mark, Sachsen, Thüringen, Braunschweig, Hannover, Oldenburg und Westfalen. Leipzig: F. A. Brockhaus.
- Lübbing, Hermann (1968). Oldenburgische Sagen. Holzberg. ASIN B002MSCI2Q.
- Samuel Meiger (1649). Nucleus historiarum.
- M., I. D. (1598). Histoires prodigieuses. Vol. 6. Paris: Cavellat.
- Menzel, Wolfgang (1858). Deutsche Dichtung von der ältesten bis auf die neueste Zeit: in 3 Bd, Volume 1. Stuttgart: Adolph Krabbe.
- Merian, Matthaeus; Zeiller, Martin (1654). Topographia und Eigentliche Beschreibung Der Vornembsten Stäte, Schlösser auch anderer Plätze und Örter in denen Hertzogthümer[n] Braunschweig und Lüneburg, und denen dazu gehörende[n] Grafschafften Herrschafften und Landen. Merian.
- Niederhöffer, Albert (1858). Mecklenburg's Volkssagen, Volume 1. Leipzig: Heinrich Hübner.
- Nigrinus, Georg; Richter, Martin (1710). Historiarum MeDVLLa Das ist: Beschreibung aller vornembsten Hauptverenderungen... Biß auff diese gegenwertige Zeit. Frankfurt am Main: Johan Jacob Porschitz.
- Palla, Rudi (1994). Verschwundene Arbeit.:Ein Thesaurus der untergegangenen Berufe. Eichborn Verlag Ag. ISBN 978-3-8218-4443-5.
- Pock, Johann J. (1710). Alvearium Curiosarum Scientiarum, Oder Immen-Hauß Verwunderlicher Wissenschafften. Augsburg: Schlüter, Happach.
- Ranke, Kurt (1954). "Die Sage vom Räuber Pape Dön" in "NORDELBINGEN. 22. Band. Beiträge zur Heimatforschung in Schleswig-Holstein, Hamburg und Lübeck". Heide, Holstein: Boyens.
- Ranke, Kurt (1978). Die Welt der einfachen Formen. Berlin, New York: Walter de Gruyter. ISBN 978-3-11-007420-8.
- Rehermann, Ernst H. (1977). Schriften zur Niederdeutschen Volkskunde, Volume 8. O. Schwartz. ISBN 978-3-509-00559-2.
- Rölleke, Heinz (1981). Westfälische Sagen. Diederichs. ISBN 978-3-424-00703-9.
- Schambach, Georg; Müller, Wilhelm (1948). Niedersächsische Sagen und Märchen. Jazzybee Verlag.
- Schanz, Julius; Kauffer, Eduard (1855). Die schönsten deutschen Sagen, Volksmärchen u. Legenden in Poesie und Prosa. Dresden: J. Breyer.
- Scheible, Johann (1847). Das Schaltjahr; welches ist der teutsch Kalender mit den Figuren, und hat 366 Tag, Volume 5. Stuttgart: Johann Scheible.
- Schlüter, Happach (1707). Politische Conferentz zwölff unterschiedlicher Stands-Persohnen von allen neuen vorfallenden Friedens- und Kriegs-Begebenheiten der gantzen Welt. Augsburg: Schlüter, Happach.
- Schultz, Alwin (2011). Das häusliche Leben der europäischen Kulturvölker vom Mittelalter bis zur zweiten Hälfte des 18. Jahrhunderts (reprint from 1903). Bremen: Outlook verlagsgesellschaft mbH. ISBN 978-3-86403-197-7.
- Sperber, Julius (1660). Von den dreyen Seculis oder Haupt-zeiten, von Anfang biss zum Ende der Welt. Amsterdam: B. Bahnsen.
- Stieffler, Johann (1668). Loci Theologiae Historici, Das ist: Geistlicher Historien-Schatz. Breslau, Jena: Johann Nisius.
- Ludwig Strackerjan (1867). Aberglaube und Sagen aus dem Herzogthum Oldenburg. G. Stelling.
- Stumpf, Johannes; Stumpf, Johann R. (1606). Schweytzer Chronick: Das ist, Beschreybung gemeiner löbicher Eydgnoschafft. J. Wolff.
- Sturm, Augustus (1731). Schau-Spiegel europäischer Thaten oder Europäische Merckwürdigkeiten. Augsburg: Augustus Sturm.
- Volkmar, Manfred (2011). Sagenhaftes entlang der Werra zwischen Eisfeld und Treffurt. Erfurt: Sutton Verlag GmbH. ISBN 978-3-86680-764-8.
- von Wedel, Andreas (1882). Hausbuch des Herrn Joachim von Wedel auf Krempzow Schloss und Blumberg erbgesessen. Tübingen: Litterarischer Verein in Stuttgart. OL 16989793M.
- Christian Weidling (1700). Der Gelehrte Kirchen-Redner, oder Excerpta Homiletica, welche aus des Seel. Herrn Lutheri, der vornehmsten Kirchen-Väter und vortrefflichsten Theologorum, als Chemnitii, Gerhardi, Dannhaueri, Balduini, Welleri, Botsacci, Finckii, Brochmanni, Hermanni, Dieterici etc. und vieler andern Schrifften mehr, einen reichen Vorrath sehr gelehrter Realien ... nach der erbaulichen Methode, welche der Sel. D. König in seiner Theologia Positiva beliebet, præsentiren, auff wiederhohltes Verlangen so wohl Geistlichen als Politischen Rednern zu gelehrter Erbauung Communiciret von D. Christian Weidlingen ...
- Wiltenburg, Joy (2012). Crime and Culture in Early Modern Germany. Charlottesville: University of Virginia Press. ISBN 978-0-8139-3302-3.
- Zeiller, Martin (1640). Ein Hundert Episteln, oder Sendschreiben, Von vnderschidlichen Politischen, Historischen, vnd andern Materien, vnd Sachen. Ulm: Görlin.
- Zeiller, Martin (1661). Miscellanea. Nuremberg: Georg Wild Eisen.
- Zeitschrift des Historischen Vereins (1860). Zeitschrift des Historischen Vereins für Niedersachsen, Jahrgang 1859. Hannover: Hahn'schen Hofbuchhandlung.
- von Ziegler und Kliphausen, Heinrich (1695). Heinrich Anshelms von Ziegler und Kliphausen, ... Täglicher Schau-Platz der Zeit: auff welchem sich ein iedweder Tag durch das gantze Jahr mit seinen merckwürdigsten Begebenheiten, so sich von Anfange der Welt biss auff diese ietzige Zeiten, an demselben zugetragen vorstellig mache. Leipsig: Gleditsch.
