= Matinecock =

Historical Indigenous people of New York

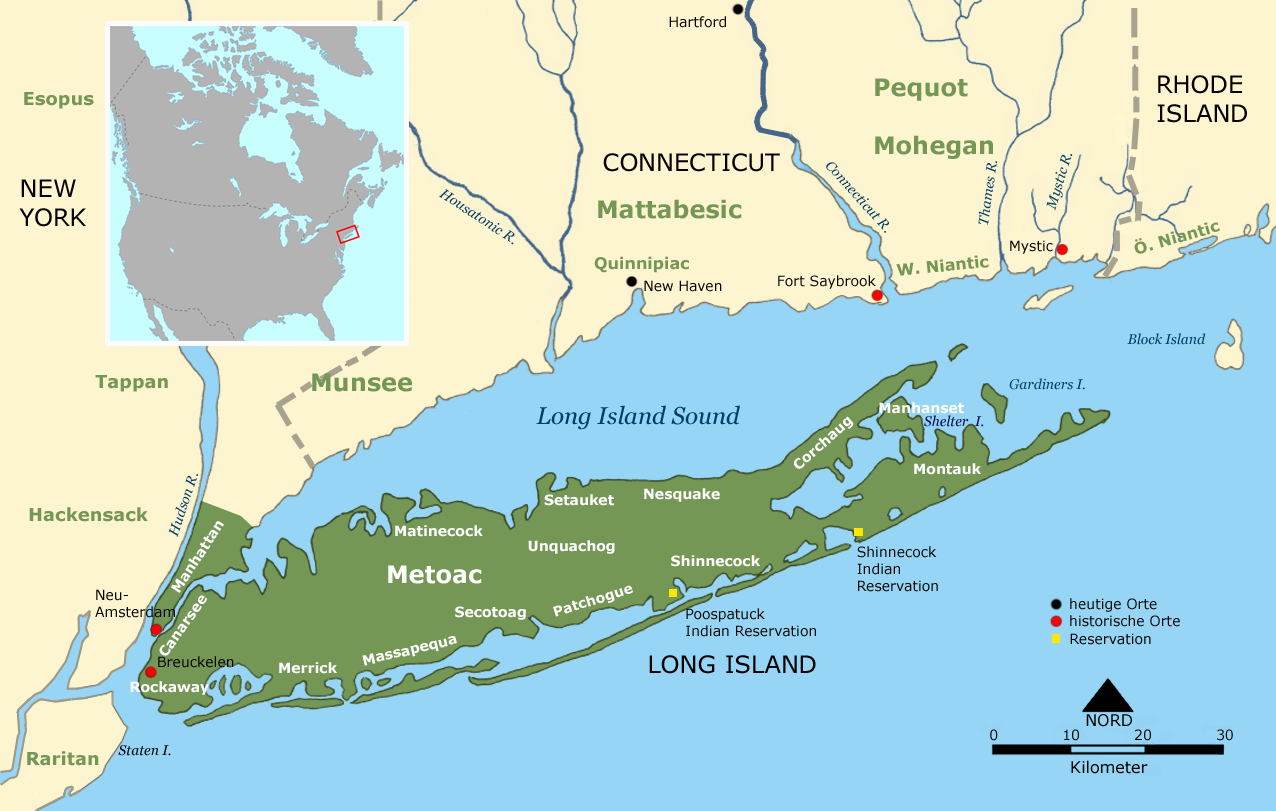
- Indigenous peoples of Long Island.

Total population
- According to the official 2020 U.S. Census, the total population of Matinecock, New York, stands at 847.

Regions with significant populations
- Long Island, New York, U.S.

Languages
- Eastern Algonquian languages

Religion
- Indigenous religion

Related ethnic groups
- other Eastern Algonquian-speaking peoples

The Matinecock were an Eastern Algonquian–speaking Indigenous people of Long Island. They lived in parts of what is now Queens in New York City and western Long Island.

== Name ==
The name "Matinecock" means "the hilly land" or "hilly country".

== History ==
The Matinecock inhabited the North Shore of Eastern Long Island for centuries prior to the arrival of European colonizers. The Matinecock lived from the Nissequogue River on the east to what is now Elmhurst on the west.

=== 17th century ===
The Matinecock people lived in the Little Neck Bay area, which had an abundance of fishing. Dutch and British settlers began arriving in the 17th century. The settlers gained control of most Matinecock land, except for Madnan's Neck. Thomas Hicks, of the Hicks family that later founded Hicksville, led a band of armed settlers who forcibly displaced the Matinecock. The battle occurred at what is now Northern Boulevard and Marathon Parkway in Little Neck, Queens.

== Legacy ==
In 2015, Northern Boulevard in Little Neck where it intersects with Marathon Parkway was "co-named" Matinecock Way in honor of the Matinecock.

== See also ==
- Indigenous peoples of New York (state)
- Indigenous peoples of the Northeastern Woodlands
