= Indigenous peoples of Delaware =

The Indigenous peoples of Delaware are the tribes who historically and currently live in the land that is now the State of Delaware in the United States of America. These tribes belong to the Northeastern Woodlands, an Indigenous cultural region. The principal tribes at the time of European colonization were the Lenape and Nanticoke tribes.

== History ==
=== Precontact ===
The earliest human inhabitants of what is now Delaware were Paleo-Indians who arrived in the region 11,500 years ago.

== 17th century ==
European colonization of Indigenous lands in what is now Delaware began in the 17th century, when Dutch and Swedish colonizers first arrived. The Dutch established the Zwaanendael Colony, while Swedish and Finnish settlers established New Sweden.

== 18th century ==
By the mid-1700s, most Lenape people had left or been dispersed from the Delaware Valley, moving westward along with other Native Americans to escape violence from European settlers.

By 1787, as English, Scotch-Irish, and other European settlers arrived in Delaware, English became the dominant language.

== 21st century ==
Documented descendants of Lenape and Nanticoke people who once lived in what is now Delaware and neighboring states are citizens of federally recognized tribes and First Nations governments, including the Delaware Nation and the Delaware Tribe of Indians in Oklahoma and the Six Nations of the Grand River First Nation in Ontario.

== Tribal legal recognition ==
=== Federal recognition ===
There are no federally recognized tribes within Delaware. However, Section 106 of the National Historic Preservation Act of 1966 requires the State of Delaware to consult federally recognized Native American tribes on all projects that could affect historic tribal lands or other properties with cultural or religious significance to Native tribes.

Federally recognized tribes with historic ties to Delaware are:

- Delaware Nation
- Delaware Tribe of Indians

=== State recognition ===
Two organizations are recognized as tribes by the State of Delaware:

- Lenape Indian Tribe of Delaware
- Nanticoke Indian Association

The two state-recognized tribes in Delaware are descended from the Delaware Moors, a mixed-race group who descend from free people of color. The Delaware Moors were legally classified as African-Americans until 1914, when the State of Delaware reclassified them as a separate, non-Black group. According to the Delaware Legislature, the Lenape Indian Tribe of Delaware descends from the historic Delaware Moors of Kent County. The two state-recognized tribes in Delaware and the state-recognized Nanticoke Lenni-Lenape Tribal Nation in New Jersey are related through ancestral and cultural ties. Ancestors of all three groups were historically known as Moors.

== See also ==
- Indigenous peoples of Maryland
- Indigenous peoples of New Jersey
- Indigenous peoples of New York
- Indigenous peoples of Virginia

== Notable people ==
- Moses Tunda Tatamy, Lenape translator and guide
