= Indigenous peoples of Long Island =

Ethnic term

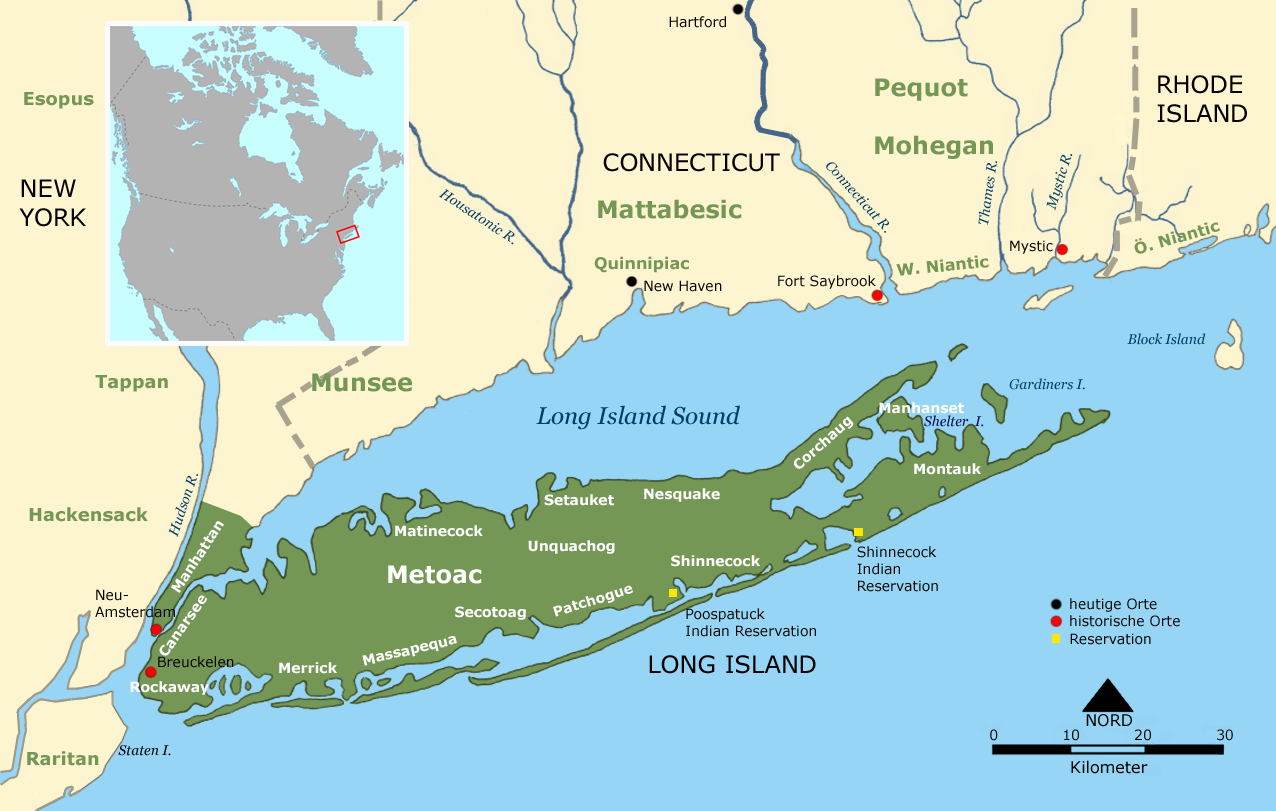
A modern map showing Long Island and most of New York City highlighted in green with locations exonyms applied to Native Americans that lived there

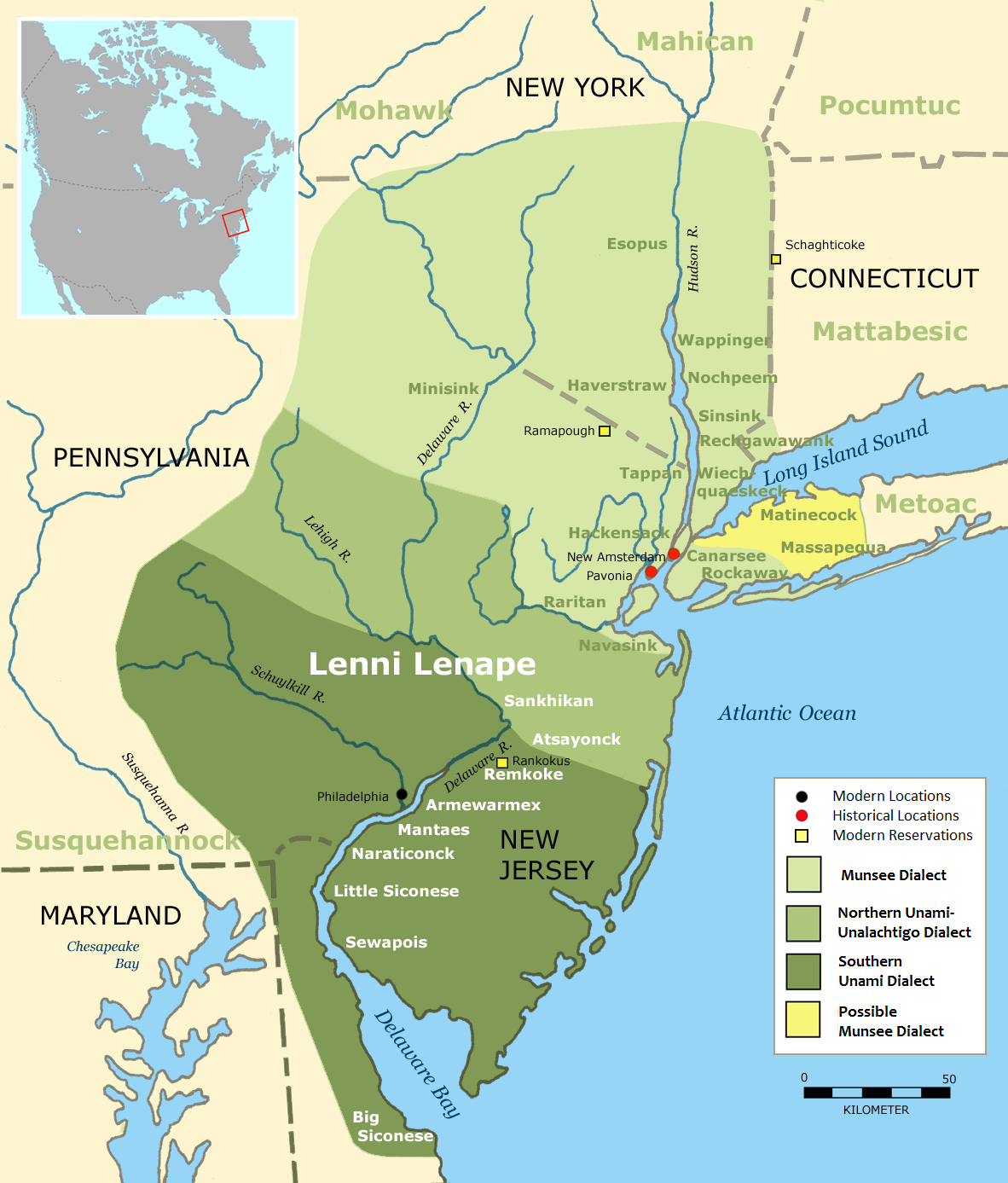
A modern map broadly showing language areas in the Mid-Atlantic region at the time of European contact in the 17th century

Indigenous Eastern Algonquian-speaking peoples have inhabited Long Island for at least 10,000 years. Indian peoples on Long Island at the time of European contact came from only two major language and cultural groups of the many Algonquian peoples who occupied Atlantic coastal areas from present-day Canada through the American South. The bands on Long Island in the west were part of the Lenape. Those to the east were culturally and linguistically connected to tribes of New England across Long Island Sound, such as the Pequot. Colonial settlers often confused Indian place names, by which the bands became known, as the name for the people living there. Many of the place names that the Lenape and Pequot populations used to refer to their villages and communities were adopted by English settlers and are still in use today.

The umbrella term Metoac was an erroneous term used by some to group together the culturally distinct Munsee-speaking Lenape (west), Quiripi-speaking Unquachog (center), and Pequot-speaking Montaukett (east) American Indians on what is now Long Island in New York state. The term was invented by amateur anthropologist and US Representative Silas Wood in the mistaken belief that the multiple Native settlements on the island (he claimed there were 12) each comprised cultural distinct tribes.

The Shinnecock Indian Nation, based in part of what is now Southampton, New York in Suffolk County, has gained federal recognition as a tribe and has a reservation there. The Shinnecock are the only federally recognized tribe on Long Island. Long Island also has one-state recognized tribe, the Unkechaug Nation.

== Etymology ==
"Metoac" as a collective term may have been derived by Wood from metau-hok, the Algonquian word for the rough periwinkle, the shell of which small sea snail was used to make wampum, a means of exchange which played an important role in the culture and economy of the region before and after the arrival of Europeans.

== Languages ==
The Native American population on Long Island has been estimated at 10,000 at the time of first contact with Europeans. They belonged to two major nations and spoke two languages within the Algonquian language group, reflecting their different connections to mainland peoples. Native Americans in the west and in the central part of Long Island were more closely associated with bands of the Lenape people in southwestern Connecticut, Eastern Pennsylvania, Lower Hudson Valley in New York, New Jersey, and Delaware. These people spoke one of the R-dialects of the Lenape language group. Those Native Americans who lived on the east end of the island were more closely related to the Pequot of eastern Connecticut and the other Algonquian language group located around Long Island Sound. They spoke a Y-dialect of the Mohegan-Montauk-Narragansett language.

== European colonization ==
European colonization of the region began in the 1620s, with Dutch colonists congregating around the lower Hudson and western Long Island. The Dutch attempted to establish jurisdiction from New Amsterdam over the western portion of Long Island (including what are now the New York City boroughs of Brooklyn and Queens).

== Displacement ==
The Pequot War (1634–1638) in southern New England and Kieft's War (1643–1645) in the New York metropolitan area were two major conflicts between the Indigenous peoples and the colonists. Exposure to new Eurasian infectious diseases, such as measles and smallpox, dramatically reduced the numbers of Native Americans on Long Island. In addition, some Native American settlements on Long Island migrated away under pressure from European encroachment. By 1659, their population was reduced to less than 500.

By this time, Samson Occom had persuaded many survivors to join the Brothertown Indians in western upstate New York, where the Oneida people of the Iroquois Confederacy shared their reservation for several years.

== Exonyms ==
For generations, colonists mistakenly used the place names as exonyms for peoples, thinking they referred to distinct tribes. Among the many locations on Long Island used by the native peoples, 19th-century American publications erroneously identified the following thirteen as "tribes" on Long Island:

"Metoac" was a term erroneously used by amateur anthropologist and U.S. Congressman Silas Wood to describe Lenape and Pequot-affiliated Native Americans on Long Island in New York state, in the belief that the various bands on the island comprised distinct tribes. He published a book in the 19th century which mistakenly claimed that several American Indian tribes were distinct to Long Island. He collectively called them the "Metoac". Scholars now understand that these historic peoples were part of two major cultural groups: the Lenape and the Wappinger-Wangunk-Quinnipiac peoples, both part of the Algonquian languages family.

| Name | Alternate names | Location | Modern place names | Notes |
|---|---|---|---|---|
| Canarsie | Carnasee | modern-day Brooklyn, New York and Maspeth, Queens, and Jamaica, New York | Canarsie, Brooklyn | According to legend, the Carnarsie sold Manhattan to the Dutch Governor Peter Minuit for "24 dollars' worth of beads and trinkets." |
| Corchaug | Cochaug, Cutchogue | around Riverhead and Southold, New York on eastern Long Island | Cutchogue, New York | The Fort Corchaug Archaeological Site is on the National Register of Historic Places. |
| Manhasset | Manhansick | Shelter Island, New York | Manhasset, New York | |
| Marsapeague | Massapequa, Marsapequa, Maspeth | south shore, from the Rockaways east into Suffolk County. | Massapequa and Maspeth, Queens | |
| Matinecock | Matinecoc | Long Island North Shore from Flushing, Queens to Huntington | Matinecock, New York | |
| Mericoke | Merrick, Meroke, Merikoke, Meracock | south shore from the Rockaways into Suffolk County | Merrick, New York | |
| Montaukett | Montauk, Meanticut | East Hampton, New York | Montauk, New York | Its sagamore Wyandanch had his name on the title transfer of most of Long Island to the European settlers |
| Nissequaq | Nesaquake, Missaquogue | North Shore from Fresh Pond to Stony Brook in Suffolk County | Nissequogue, New York and the Nissequogue River | |
| Rockaway | Rechaweygh, Rechquaakie | around Rockaway and portions of Jamaica and Maspeth | The Rockaways is a place name derived from this. | |
| Secatague | Secatoag, Secatogue | Islip on the south shore. | | |
| Setauket | Setalcott | North Shore from Stony Brook to Wading River, New York | Setauket, New York | |
| Shinnecock | | Southampton | Shinnecock Hills, New York and Shinnecock Inlet | The federally recognized tribe occupies the Shinnecock Reservation, New York. |
| Unkechaug | Patchogue, Onechechaug, Patchoag, Unchachaug, Unquaches, Unquachog, Unquachock, Unchechauge | south shore from Brookhaven, New York to Southampton, New York | Patchogue, New York | The Unkechaug Nation have a community on the Poospatuck Reservation in Mastic, New York. It is recognized by the state of New York, though not federally recognized. |

== State and federal recognition ==
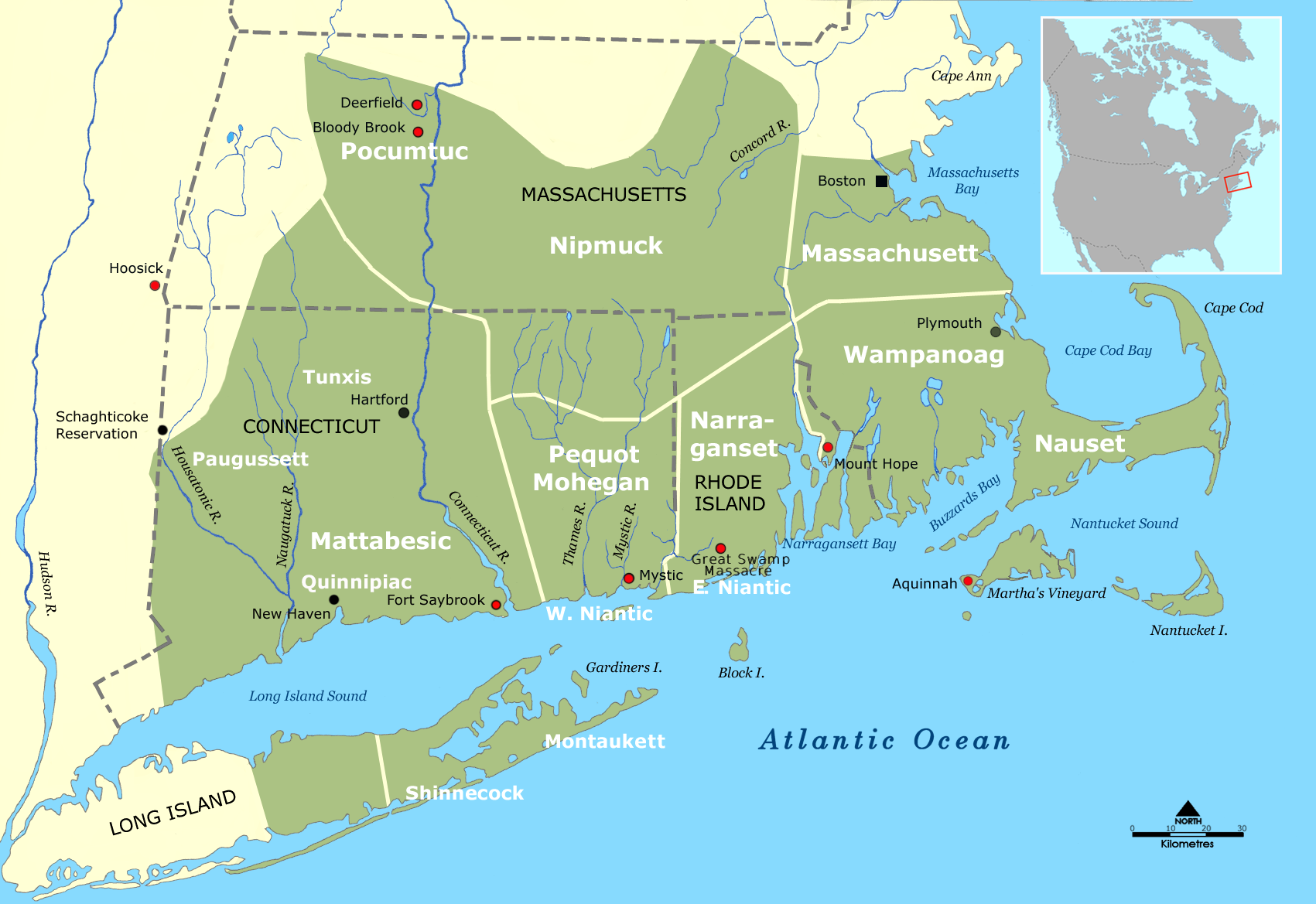
Modern map showing linguistic groups, including areas where modern reservations are located

There is one federally recognized tribe on Long Island, the Shinnecock Indian Nation. New York State has granted official state recognition to the Unkechaug Nation, the only state-recognized tribe in New York. The Shinnecock Indian Nation are based at Shinnecock Reservation near Southampton on the South Shore. The state-recognized Unkechaug Nation's Poospatuck Reservation at Mastic is the smallest Indian reservation in the state.

Since the mid-20th century, the Montaukett, Setalcott, and Matinnecock peoples have organized and established organizations. All are seeking both state and federal recognition.

At the end of 2009, the administration of President Barack Obama announced the Shinnecock Indian Nation had met federal criteria as a tribe. The Shinnecock were officially recognized by the United States government in October 2010 after a more than 30-year effort, which included suing the Department of the Interior. The Acting Principal Deputy Assistant Secretary of Indian Affairs, George T. Skibine, issued the final determination of the tribe's recognized status on June 13, 2010.

== See also ==
- Indigenous peoples of New York (state)
