= List of Indian reservations in New York =

This is a list of Native American reservations in the U.S. state of New York.

New York counties, municipalities, towns, and Indian reservations.

== Reservations of federally recognized tribes ==
=== Active ===
==== Western New York ====
- Allegany (Cattaraugus County). 43.7 square miles (113 km^{2}), population 6,664 (as of 2020).
- Cattaraugus (Erie County, Cattaraugus County, Chautauqua County). 34.4 square miles (89 km^{2}), population 2,676.
- Oil Springs (Cattaraugus County, Allegany County). 0.96 square miles (2.5 km^{2}), population 20.
- Tonawanda (Genesee County, Erie County, Niagara County). 0.80 square miles (2.1 km^{2}), population 261.
- Tuscarora (Niagara County). 9.1 square miles (24 km^{2}), population 1,145.

==== Central New York ====
- Onondaga (Onondaga County). 9.3 square miles (24 km^{2}), population 832.

==== North Country ====
- St. Regis Mohawk (Franklin County). 18.9 square miles (49 km^{2}), population 3,663.

==== Long Island ====
- Shinnecock (Suffolk County). 1.3 square miles (3.4 km^{2}), population 819.

=== Former ===
- Buffalo Creek (Erie County). 78 square miles (200 km^{2}), dissolved in 1837 as a part of Andrew Jackson's policy of Indian removal.

== State reservations ==
New York has one active reservation of a state-recognized tribe:

- Poospatuck Reservation of the Unkechaug Nation (Suffolk County). 0.17 square miles (0.44 km^{2}), population 436.

== See also ==
- Indigenous peoples of New York (state)
