= Forge River (New York) =

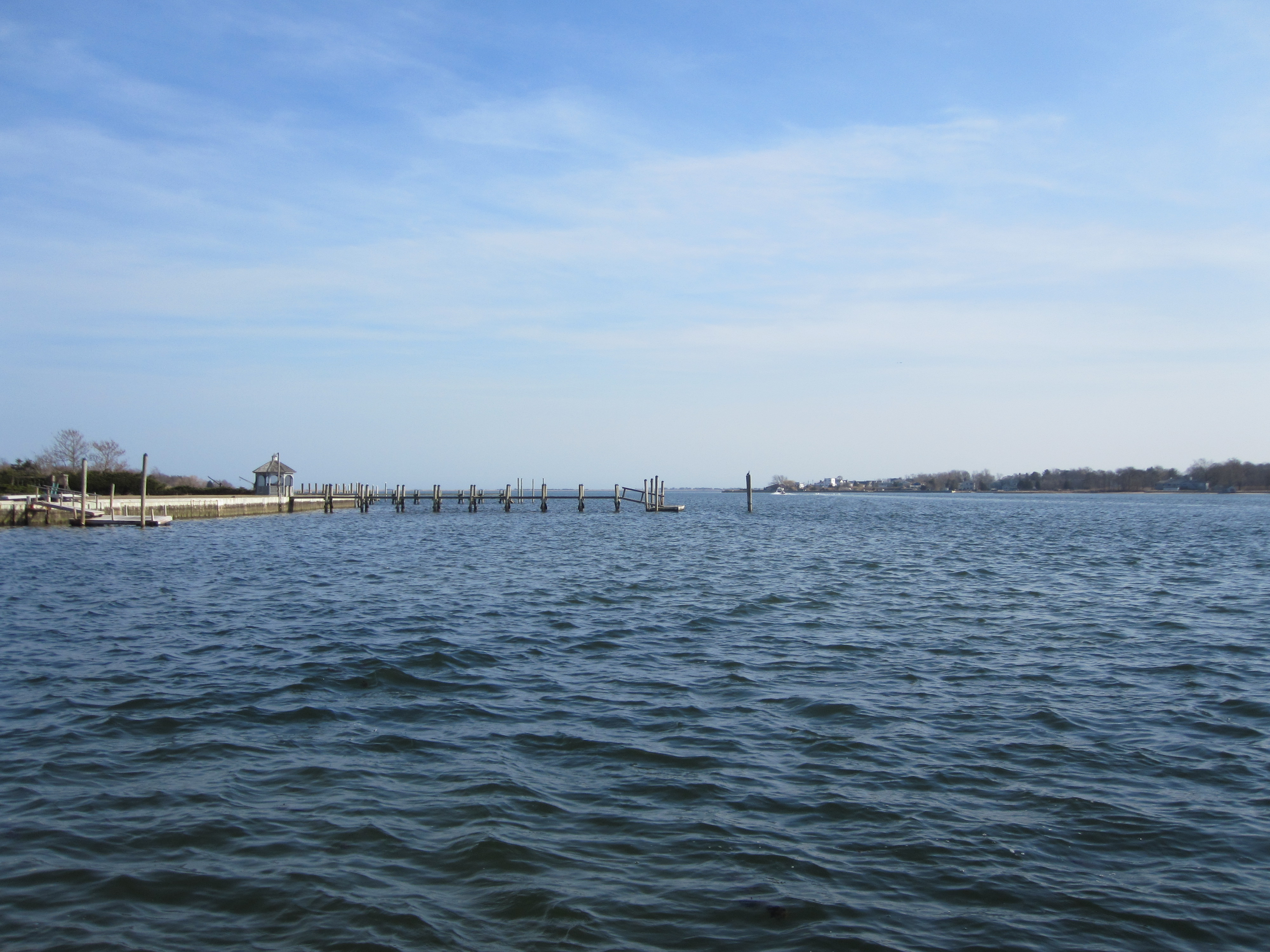

Location
- Country: United States of America
- Region: Mastic and Moriches, New York

Physical characteristics
- Source
  - location: Moriches Bay
- Mouth
  - coordinates: 40°46′38″N 72°48′39″W
- Length: 3.2 nmi (5.9 km)

Forge River is a partially mixed estuary on the south shore of Long Island in the township of Brookhaven, Suffolk County, New York.

== Course ==
Forge River (which was once called the Wegonthotak River) is the major tributary of Moriches Bay, a part of Long Island's south shore bay system that is protected from the Atlantic Ocean by outer barrier islands. The river is a remnant stream bed cut through the southerly sloping glacial out-wash plain deposited during the Wisconsin glaciation that ended some 20,000 years ago. The stream valley flooded as sea level rose.

It now functions as a small estuary. Circulation in the river is complex and is driven by a variety of forces including the tides, water column density structure, groundwater discharge, stream flow, and wind.

The tidal portion of the river is 3.2 nautical miles long that ends abruptly at Montauk Highway which serves as a dam between the river towns of Mastic and Moriches New York.

Two freshwater ponds (East Mill Pond and West Mill Pond) continuously discharge to the tidal Forge at this location. The surface watershed of the river is 10,641 acres (43.06 km^{2}). About 20 percent of the watershed is in the deep groundwater recharge zone.

The river is shallow throughout and has been historically so. The mean depths in much of the center of the river were about 4–4.5 ft at mean low water. The centerline, mean depth, based on the School of Marine and Atmospheric Sciences (SoMAS) survey of 2007–2008, is 4.9–6.6 ft. The depth now is slightly deeper in some locations than indicated on the previous surveys because a 70-m-wide (75-yd-wide) channel has been dredged to a design depth of 7 feet (2.1 m).

Tributaries of the river including Wills Creek, Poospatuck Creek, Lons Creek, and Home Creek on the west side of the Forge have been dredged as well.

The depths in these creeks can be as great as 6.6 feet (2.0 m). A sill has built up at the mouths of these tributaries so that each one acts as a small basin in which circulation is limited. The same is true for Old Neck Creek on the east side of the river.

The upland community of the William Floyd Estate provides habitat for breeding American woodcock (Scolopax minor) and a variety of migrating and nesting songbirds, while adjacent tidal areas afford habitat for nesting American bittern (Botarus lentiginosus), seaside sparrow, and osprey. This area is one of the few remaining sites on the south shore of Long Island where tidal wetlands are contiguous with an undeveloped upland buffer.

== Duck farming off the river ==
The impairment of Moriches Bay was linked with the growth of the duck ranching industry decades earlier along the Forge and other tributaries of region. Duck farm activities were identified as a primary source of pollution to Moriches Bay in several studies conducted by Woods Hole Oceanographic Institution (WHOI) investigators between 1950 and 1959.

One of several measures used to attribute duck ranching with intense pollution problems was the unusually high amounts of duck-derived phosphorus in waters proximate to duck farming sites.

The last of the farms, the Jurgielewicz Duck Farm (founded in 1919) closed in August 2011 after declaring bankruptcy. At its peak, the 65 acre farm (which was a landmark on the Montauk Branch of the Long Island Rail Road) claimed to be America's largest free-range duck operation, raising 1 million Pekin ducks a year.

== See also ==
- Mastic, New York
- Moriches Inlet
- Smith Point
