= Avery Dennis Sr. =

Native American activist

Avery Dennis Sr., also known as "Chief Eagle Eye" (April 4, 1929 – September 5, 2015) was an American Shinnecock tribal politician, activist and substance abuse counselor. Dennis served as the Trustee of the Shinnecock Indian Nation of Long Island, New York, for nineteen nonconsecutive years between 1952 and 1985, becoming one of the Shinnecock's longest serving elected leaders in history. The trustee is the Shinnecock's highest officeholder.

Dennis, a proponent of Shinnecock sovereignty, helped lead several land-claim legal battles on behalf of the Shinnecock Reservation, located in Southampton, New York. The Shinnecock Indian Nation finally won federal recognition from the U.S. government in 2010, after a campaign which spanned decades. Dennis also established the Shinnecock Reservation's first substance abuse recovery program during the 1980s. His program to combat substance abuse is still active, as of 2015.

Dennis, a lifelong resident of the Shinnecock Reservation, was born on April 4, 1929, to parents, William Pinn and Pauline Dennis. He attended elementary school in the Shinnecock One-Room School House. Dennis enlisted in the United States Army Air Corps during World War II and gained the rank of sergeant.

He returned to the Shinnecock Reservation after his honorable discharge from the Army Air Corps following World War II. Dennis joined the United States Postal Service, where he worked for 26 years until his retirement. He married his wife, Dorothy, with whom he had five children, in 1949.

Avery Dennis did not complete his high school education and receive his high school diploma until he was in his 50s. He then studied substance abuse and pursued a career as a substance abuse counselor. Dennis created the first substance abuse recovery program to combat drug and alcohol abuse in the Shinnecock Reservation. It was the Shinnecock's first substance abuse program, is still in use more than 30 years after its establishment.

Avery Dennis Sr. died from heart failure on September 5, 2015, at the age of 86. His funeral was held on September 8, 2015, at the Shinnecock Presbyterian Church, where he was a church elder. Dennis was buried with full military honors at the Shinnecock tribal cemetery. He was survived by his wife, Dorothy Dennis; five children - Diane Smith, Doreen Dennis-Pepe, Avery Dennis Jr., Andre Dennis, Alton Dennis and Danny Collins Sr.; 18 grandchildren; and 22 great-grandchildren.
