= Lisa Goree =

American politician

Chair of the Shinnecock Indian Nation Council of Trustees
- Incumbent
- Assumed office 2024
- Preceded by: Bryan Polite

Personal details
- Born: 1963 or 1964 (age 61–62)
- Spouse: Kirstin Goree
- Children: 3
- Occupation: Politician; tax assessor

Lisa Goree (born 1963/1964) is a Native American politician currently serving as chair of the Shinnecock Indian Nation Council of Trustees, the first woman elected to the position.

== Biography ==
Goree was born to a single mother and raised on the Shinnecock Reservation (the first, and so far, only federally recognized tribe in Long Island) in Southampton, New York. Later moving northward to Riverhead as a young preteen, she went to Riverhead High School.

In the late 1980s, Goree married Kirstin Goree, a carpenter, and they moved back to the tribal territory in the early 1990s (Note: Sources vary on the exact year: the New York Times says she moved in 1990, while Dan's Papers says she moved in 1992.) to raise their children. In 1994, she became one of the inaugural community health workers at Shinnecock Indian Health Services medical center. In 2007, she became deputy assessor of the Town of Southampton, and in 2013, she was promoted to tax assessor. She has also served as a board member for the New York State Assessors Association.

After the early resignation of Bryan Polite, the leader of the Shinnecock Indian Nation Council of Trustees, due to exhaustion, Goree ran in the 2024 Shinnecock leadership election. She was elected as Polite's successor, winning with 133 votes over former predecessor Randy King. Goree later explained to WLIW-FM that she decided on a shorter term to "make sure it's the right fit, and make sure people want me in there". She later announced that one of her goals is to settle the tribe's land dispute with Shinnecock Hills Golf Club.

Although women had already served as trustees, with three of them in the council at the time, she became the first woman elected to the position since the state government's 1792 establishment of the Shinnecock trusteeship. This milestone had been celebrated by her supporters as "a return to its matriarchal leadership roots."

She has three daughters; one of them, Kesi, played NCAA Division II women's basketball for the NYIT Bears and later became the first Native American woman in the Southampton Town Police Department.

== Election results ==
2024 Shinnecock leadership election
Party	Candidate	Votes	%	±%
Nonpartisan	Lisa Goree	133		
Nonpartisan	Randy King	103		
Nonpartisan	Keith Arrindell Jr.	38		
