= Indigenous peoples of New Jersey =

The Indigenous peoples of New Jersey are the tribes who historically and currently live in the land that is now the State of New Jersey in the United States of America. These tribes belong to the Northeastern Woodlands, an Indigenous cultural region. The principal tribe at the time of European colonization was the Lenape tribe.

== History ==
=== Precontact ===
The earliest human inhabitants of what is now New Jersey were Paleo-Indians who arrived in the region 13,000 years ago following the recession of the Wisconsin glaciation.

== 17th century ==
In the 1600s, around 8,000 Indigenous people lived in colonial-era New Jersey.

== 18th century ==
By the 1700s, Indigenous peoples had been decimated by colonization, war, and disease, and most had left New Jersey.

== Tribal legal recognition ==
=== Federal recognition ===
There are no federally recognized tribes within New Jersey. However, Section 106 of the National Historic Preservation Act of 1966 requires the State of New Jersey to consult with federally recognized Native American tribes on all projects that could affect historic tribal lands or other properties with cultural or religious significance to Native tribes.

Federally recognized tribes with historic ties to New Jersey are:

- Absentee-Shawnee Tribe of Indians of Oklahoma
- Delaware Nation in Oklahoma
- Delaware Tribe of Indians in Oklahoma
- Shawnee Tribe
- Stockbridge–Munsee Community

=== State recognition ===
Three tribes are state-recognized by the State of New Jersey:

- Nanticoke Lenni-Lenape Tribal Nation
- Ramapough Lenape Nation
- Powhatan Renape Nation

== See also ==
- Indigenous peoples of Delaware
- Indigenous peoples of Maryland
- Indigenous peoples of New York

== Notable people ==
- King Nummy, Chief of the Kechemeche
- Oratam, Sachem of the Hackensack people
