= African Americans in New York (state) =

Total population
- 3.002 million (2020)

Regions with significant populations
- In major New York cities such as New York City, Buffalo, Syracuse, Albany, and Rochester and also smaller cities and towns in or near the Hudson Valley between New York City and Albany such as Poughkeepsie, Newburgh and Monticello

Religion
- Christianity

African-American New Yorkers are residents of the U.S. state of New York who are of African American ancestry. As of the 2020 U.S. Census, African-Americans were 17.6% of the state's population. New York has the fourth largest African American population of any state in the United States, after Texas, Georgia and Florida. Black people were brought to the state during the slave trade when New York was a Dutch colony. New York abolished slavery in 1827. Many black Southerners from Southern states such as Georgia, Virginia and the Carolinas moved to the state during the Great Migration. A second Black migration wave from Caribbean countries such as Jamaica began around the same time. African slaves spoke Dutch in New Netherlands.

Some Black New Yorkers are Black Indians. Due to a history of intermarriage between Black and Shinnecock people, many citizens of the Shinnecock Indian Nation have African ancestry.

== Population ==
In the 2020 Census, 2,986,172 New York residents were identified as African American (of the total 20,201,249). In two of the state's 62 counties, African Americans make up more than 20% of the population: Bronx (33.1%) and Kings (28.2%). African Americans in the seven counties of Kings (772,050), Bronx (487,118), Queens (403,077), New York (229,361), Nassau (153,274), Westchester (141,094), and Erie (134,795) make up more than 77% of all African Americans in the state.

== See also ==
- African Americans in New York City
- History of slavery in New York (state)
- Demographics of New York (state)
- List of African-American newspapers in New York
- African Americans in New Jersey
