= Indigenous peoples of New York (state) =

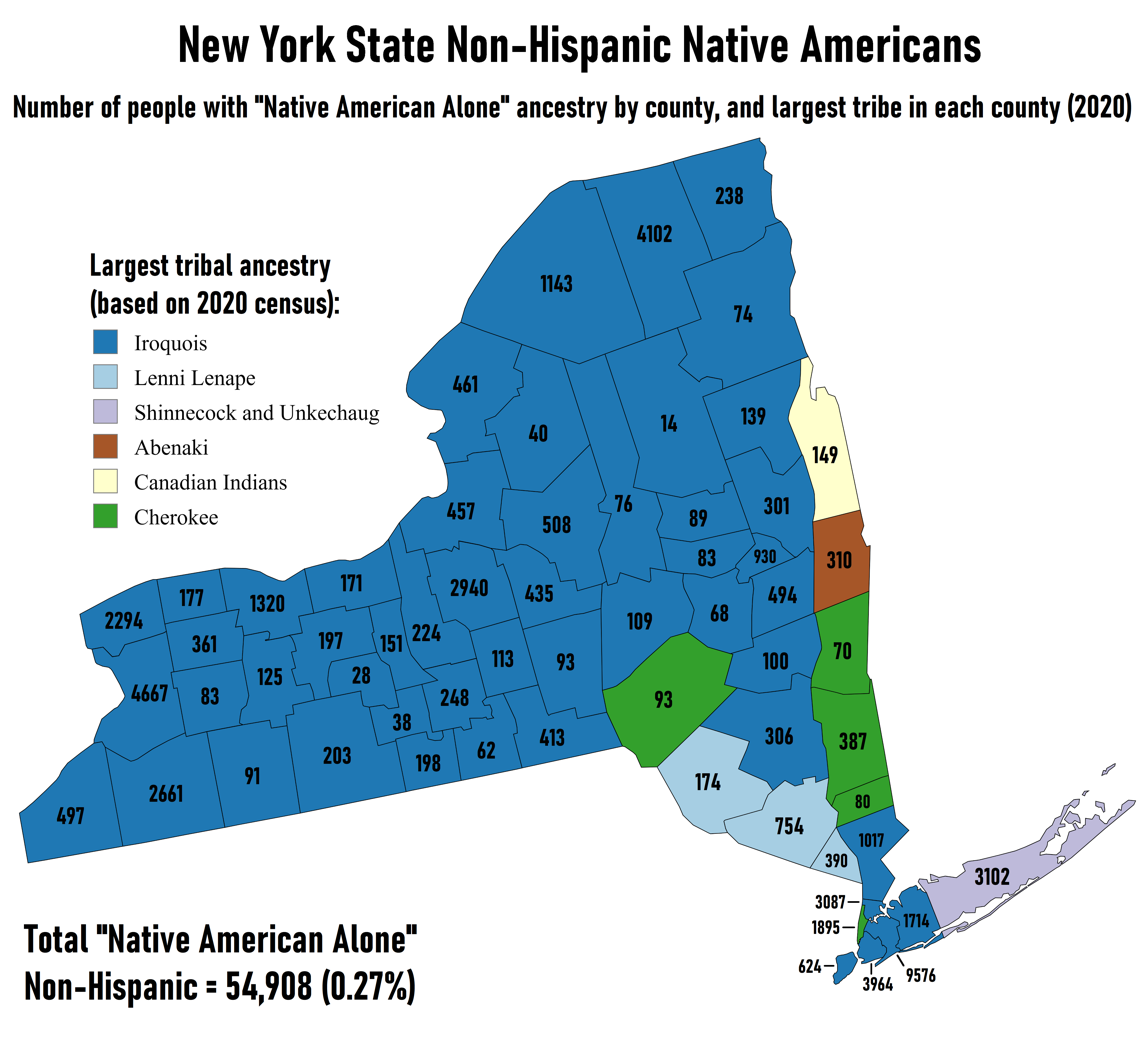

Total population
- 2.0%

Languages
- American Indian English, Native American languages

Religion
- Native American religions

Indigenous peoples have lived in what is now the New York state area for at least 13,000 years. They initially settled in the space around Lake Champlain, the Hudson River Valley and Oneida Lake. These tribes belong to the Northeastern Woodlands, an Indigenous cultural region. Tribes at the time of European colonization included the Lenape, Mohicans, Shinnecock, Wappinger, and Haudenosaunee peoples, including the Cayuga, Mohawk, Oneida, Onondaga, Seneca, and Tuscarora.

== Tribal legal recognition ==
=== Federal recognition ===
There are currently eight federally recognized Native Americans tribes in New York: the Cayuga Nation, Oneida Indian Nation, Onondaga Nation, Saint Regis Mohawk Tribe, Seneca Nation of Indians, Shinnecock Indian Nation, Tonawanda Band of Seneca, and the Tuscarora Nation of New York. As mandated by the National Historic Preservation Act, New York also consults with federally recognized tribes with historic tries to the state, including the Seneca–Cayuga Nation of Oklahoma, the Delaware Nation of Oklahoma, the Delaware Tribe of Indians, and the Stockbridge–Munsee Community.

=== State recognition ===
New York recognizes one non-federally recognized tribe, the Unkechaug Indian Nation.

== See also ==
- Demographics of New York (state)
- History of New York (state)
- Indigenous peoples of Long Island
- Indigenous peoples of New Jersey
- List of Indian reservations in New York
