= List of United States Supreme Court cases, volume 180 =

Supreme Court of the United States
- Interactive map of Supreme Court of the United States
- 38°53′26″N 77°00′16″W
- Established: March 4, 1789; 236 years ago
- Location: Washington, D.C.
- Coordinates: 38°53′26″N 77°00′16″W
- Composition method: Presidential nomination with Senate confirmation
- Authorised by: Constitution of the United States, Art. III, § 1
- Judge term length: life tenure, subject to impeachment and removal
- Number of positions: 9 (by statute)
- Website: supremecourt.gov

This is a list of cases reported in volume 180 of United States Reports, decided by the Supreme Court of the United States in 1901.

== Justices of the Supreme Court at the time of volume 180 U.S. ==
The Supreme Court is established by Article III, Section 1 of the Constitution of the United States, which says: "The judicial Power of the United States, shall be vested in one supreme Court . . .". The size of the Court is not specified; the Constitution leaves it to Congress to set the number of justices. Under the Judiciary Act of 1789 Congress originally fixed the number of justices at six (one chief justice and five associate justices). Since 1789 Congress has varied the size of the Court from six to seven, nine, ten, and back to nine justices (always including one chief justice).

When the cases in volume 180 were decided the Court comprised the following nine members:

Portrait	Justice	Office	Home State	Succeeded	Date confirmed by the Senate (Vote)	Tenure on Supreme Court
	Melville Fuller	Chief Justice	Illinois	Morrison Waite	July 20, 1888 (41–20)	October 8, 1888 – July 4, 1910 (Died)
	John Marshall Harlan	Associate Justice	Kentucky	David Davis	November 29, 1877 (Acclamation)	December 10, 1877 – October 14, 1911 (Died)
	Horace Gray	Associate Justice	Massachusetts	Nathan Clifford	December 20, 1881 (51–5)	January 9, 1882 – September 15, 1902 (Died)
	David Josiah Brewer	Associate Justice	Kansas	Stanley Matthews	December 18, 1889 (53–11)	January 6, 1890 – March 28, 1910 (Died)
	Henry Billings Brown	Associate Justice	Michigan	Samuel Freeman Miller	December 29, 1890 (Acclamation)	January 5, 1891 – May 28, 1906 (Retired)
	George Shiras Jr.	Associate Justice	Pennsylvania	Joseph P. Bradley	July 26, 1892 (Acclamation)	October 10, 1892 – February 23, 1903 (Retired)
	Edward Douglass White	Associate Justice	Louisiana	Samuel Blatchford	February 19, 1894 (Acclamation)	March 12, 1894 – December 18, 1910 (Continued as chief justice)
	Rufus W. Peckham	Associate Justice	New York	Howell Edmunds Jackson	December 9, 1895 (Acclamation)	January 6, 1896 – October 24, 1909 (Died)
	Joseph McKenna	Associate Justice	California	Stephen Johnson Field	January 21, 1898 (Acclamation)	January 26, 1898 – January 5, 1925 (Retired)

== Citation style ==
Under the Judiciary Act of 1789 the federal court structure at the time comprised District Courts, which had general trial jurisdiction; Circuit Courts, which had mixed trial and appellate (from the US District Courts) jurisdiction; and the United States Supreme Court, which had appellate jurisdiction over the federal District and Circuit courts—and for certain issues over state courts. The Supreme Court also had limited original jurisdiction (i.e., in which cases could be filed directly with the Supreme Court without first having been heard by a lower federal or state court). There were one or more federal District Courts and/or Circuit Courts in each state, territory, or other geographical region.

The Judiciary Act of 1891 created the United States Courts of Appeals and reassigned the jurisdiction of most routine appeals from the district and circuit courts to these appellate courts. The Act created nine new courts that were originally known as the "United States Circuit Courts of Appeals." The new courts had jurisdiction over most appeals of lower court decisions. The Supreme Court could review either legal issues that a court of appeals certified or decisions of court of appeals by writ of certiorari.

Bluebook citation style is used for case names, citations, and jurisdictions.

- "# Cir." = United States Court of Appeals
  - e.g., "3d Cir." = United States Court of Appeals for the Third Circuit
- "C.C.D." = United States Circuit Court for the District of . . .
  - e.g.,"C.C.D.N.J." = United States Circuit Court for the District of New Jersey
- "D." = United States District Court for the District of . . .
  - e.g.,"D. Mass." = United States District Court for the District of Massachusetts
- "E." = Eastern; "M." = Middle; "N." = Northern; "S." = Southern; "W." = Western
  - e.g.,"C.C.S.D.N.Y." = United States Circuit Court for the Southern District of New York
  - e.g.,"M.D. Ala." = United States District Court for the Middle District of Alabama
- "Ct. Cl." = United States Court of Claims
- The abbreviation of a state's name alone indicates the highest appellate court in that state's judiciary at the time.
  - e.g.,"Pa." = Supreme Court of Pennsylvania
  - e.g.,"Me." = Supreme Judicial Court of Maine

== List of cases in volume 180 U.S. ==
Case Name	Page and year	Opinion of the Court	Concurring opinion(s)	Dissenting opinion(s)	Lower Court	Disposition
Yazoo and Mississippi Valley Railroad Company v. Adams I	1 (1901)	Brown	none	none	Miss.	affirmed
Yazoo and Mississippi Valley Railroad Company v. Adams II	26 (1901)	Brown	none	none	Miss.	affirmed
Illinois Central Railroad Company v. Adams	28 (1901)	Brown	none	none	C.C.S.D. Miss.	reversed
Yazoo and Mississippi Valley Railroad Company v. Adams III	41 (1901)	Brown	none	none	Miss.	dismissed
Queen of the Pacific	49 (1901)	Brown	none	none	9th Cir.	reversed
Bradshaw v. Ashley	59 (1901)	Peckham	none	none	D.C. Cir.	affirmed
Thompson v. Los Angeles Farming and Milling Company	72 (1901)	McKenna	none	none	Cal.	affirmed
Gusman v. Marrero	81 (1901)	McKenna	none	none	C.C.E.D. La.	affirmed
Turner v. Richardson	87 (1901)	McKenna	none	none	La.	affirmed
District of Columbia v. Robinson	92 (1901)	McKenna	none	none	D.C. Cir.	affirmed
Neely v. Henkel	109 (1901)	Harlan	none	none	C.C.S.D.N.Y.	affirmed
Dooley v. Pease	126 (1901)	Shiras	none	none	7th Cir.	affirmed
Liverpool and London and Globe Insurance Company v. Kearney	132 (1901)	Harlan	none	none	8th Cir.	affirmed
Hewitt v. Schultz	139 (1901)	Harlan	none	Brewer	N.D.	reversed
Moore v. Cormode	167 (1901)	Harlan	none	none	Wash.	affirmed
Powers v. Slaght	173 (1901)	Harlan	none	none	Wash.	affirmed
Moore v. Stone	180 (1901)	Harlan	none	none	Wash.	affirmed
City of New Orleans v. Fisher	185 (1901)	Fuller	none	none	5th Cir.	affirmed
City of New Orleans v. Warner	199 (1901)	Brown	none	none	5th Cir.	affirmed
Missouri v. Illinois	208 (1901)	Shiras	none	Fuller	original	demurrers overruled
In re District of Columbia	250 (1901)	Fuller	none	none	Ct. Cl.	affirmed
Ansley v. Ainsworth	253 (1901)	Fuller	none	none	D. Ct. Indian Terr.	dismissed
Montoya v. United States	261 (1901)	Brown	none	none	Ct. Cl.	affirmed
Conners v. United States	271 (1901)	Brown	none	none	Ct. Cl.	affirmed
City of Lampasas v. Bell	276 (1901)	McKenna	none	none	C.C.W.D. Tex.	dismissed
Holly v. Domestic and Foreign Missionary Society of the Protestant Episcopal Church	284 (1901)	Shiras	none	none	2d Cir.	affirmed
Robinson v. Southern National Bank	295 (1901)	Shiras	none	none	2d Cir.	affirmed
McDonald v. Massachusetts	311 (1901)	Gray	none	none	Mass. Super. Ct.	affirmed
Marx v. Ebner	314 (1901)	Peckham	none	none	D. Alaska	affirmed
New Orleans Debenture Redemption Company v. Louisiana	320 (1901)	Peckham	none	none	La.	affirmed
Blythe v. Hinckley	333 (1901)	Peckham	none	none	Cal.	affirmed
United States v. Beebe	343 (1901)	Peckham	none	none	5th Cir.	reversed
Bird v. United States	356 (1901)	Shiras	none	none	D. Alaska	reversed
Gardner v. Bonestell	362 (1901)	Brewer	none	none	Cal.	affirmed
Rice v. Ames	371 (1901)	Brown	none	none	N.D. Ill.	affirmed
Wheless v. City of St. Louis	379 (1901)	Fuller	none	none	C.C.E.D. Mo.	affirmed
Hobbs v. Beach	383 (1901)	Brown	none	none	1st Cir.	affirmed
Mitchell v. Furman	402 (1901)	Fuller	none	none	C.C.S.D. Fla.	reversed
Johns v. Wilson	440 (1901)	Brown	none	none	Ariz.	affirmed
Cargill Company v. Minnesota	452 (1901)	Harlan	none	none	Minn.	affirmed
Mitchell v. First National Bank	471 (1901)	Harlan	none	none	2d Cir.	reversed
Thompson v. Ferry	484 (1901)	Fuller	none	none	Ariz.	affirmed
Li Sing v. United States	486 (1901)	Shiras	none	none	2d Cir.	affirmed
Magruder v. Armes	496 (1901)	Brewer	none	none	D.C. Cir.	dismissed
Minnesota v. Brundage	499 (1901)	Harlan	none	none	C.C.D. Minn.	reversed
Wilkes County v. Coler	506 (1901)	Harlan	none	none	4th Cir.	certification
Mountain View Mining and Milling Company v. McFadden	533 (1901)	Fuller	none	none	9th Cir.	reversed
In re McKenzie	536 (1901)	Fuller	none	none	9th Cir.	habeas corpus denied
Throckmorton v. Holt	552 (1901)	Peckham	none	none	D.C. Cir.	reversed
Freeport Water Company v. City of Freeport	587 (1901)	McKenna	none	White	Ill.	affirmed
Danville Water Company v. City of Danville	619 (1901)	McKenna	none	White	Ill.	affirmed
Rogers Park Water Company v. Fergus	624 (1901)	McKenna	none	White	Ill.	affirmed

== See also ==
- Certificate of division
