= Matchcoat =

Native American outer garment consisting of a length of coarse woolen cloth (stroud)

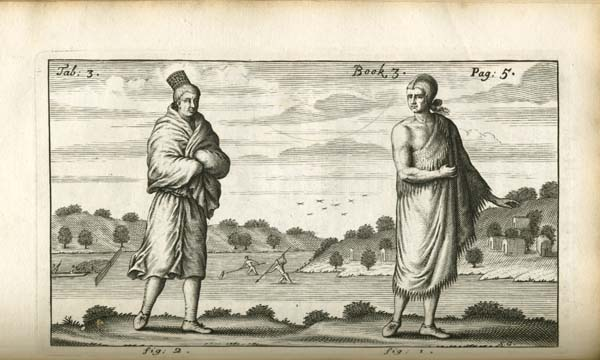
"Fig. 1. wears the proper Indian Match-coat, which is made of Skins, drest with the Furr on, sowed together, and worn with the Furr inwards, having the edges also gashed for beauty sake. ... Fig 2. wears the Duffield Match-coat bought of the English"

A matchcoat or match coat is an outer garment consisting of a length of coarse woolen cloth (stroud), usually about 2 yards (2 m) long, worn wrapped around the upper part of the body like a toga. Historically, they have been worn primarily by the Indigenous peoples of the Northeastern Woodlands in North America, who may still wear them as regalia or for traditional events. The matchcoat might be worn by people of either sex. It was a common article of trade by the English and French with the peoples of several Nations.

The matchcoat was usually fastened with a belt; no buttons or pins were used. It could also serve as a blanket for sleeping.

The name "matchcoat" is a transliteration into English of an Algonquian word referring to clothing in general.

== History ==
The original version of the matchcoat was a cloak of animal skin, often worn with the fur inside during colder weather. During the course of the 1600s this began to be replaced by woven fabric purchased from the European settlers. In 1644 Johannes Megapolensis wrote

In winter, they [the Mohawks] hang about them simply an undressed deer or bear or panther skin; or they take some beaver and otter skins, wild cat, racoon, martin, otter, mink, squirrel or such like skins, of which there are plenty in this country, and sew some of them to others, until it is a square piece, and that is then a garment for them; or they buy of us Dutchmen two and a half ells of duffel, and that they hang simply about them, just as it was, without sewing it

During the late 1600s there was increasing use of ready-made clothing and a corresponding decline in use of matchcoats.

== See also ==
- Belted plaid
- Draped garment
