= Honniasont =

Indigenous people of North America

The Honniasont (Oniasont, Oniassontke, Honniasontkeronon) were a little-known Indigenous people of the Northeastern Woodlands originally from eastern Ohio, western Pennsylvania, and West Virginia. They appear to have inhabited the upper Ohio River valley, above Louisville, Kentucky.

== Language ==
The Honniasont language may have been considered an Iroquoian language. Charles Hanna believed their name, first appearing as Oniasont on 17th-century French maps, to be a variation of the name of the tribe recorded in West Virginia and western Virginia at the same time period, as Nahyssan and Monahassanough, i.e. the Tutelo, a Siouan language speaking people.
