= Montoya v. United States =

1901 US Supreme Court decision on Native Americans

- Supreme Court of the United States

Argued December 14, 17, 1900 Decided February 11, 1901
- Full case name: Montoya v. United States
- Citations: 180 U.S. 261 (more)

Case history
- Prior: Case dismissed 32 Ct. Cl. 349

Court membership
- Chief Justice Melville Fuller Associate Justices John M. Harlan · Horace Gray; David J. Brewer · Henry B. Brown; George Shiras Jr. · Edward D. White; Rufus W. Peckham · Joseph McKenna

Case opinion
- Majority: Brown, joined by unanimous

Montoya v. United States (180 U.S. 261), was a 1901 decision of the United States Supreme Court. The decision was unanimous, with the opinion authored by Justice Henry Billings Brown.

This United States Supreme Court case came about when the surviving partner of the firm of E. Montoya & Sons petitioned against the United States and the Mescalero Apache Indians for the value their livestock which was taken in March 1880. It was believed that the livestock was taken by "Victorio's Band" which was a group of these American Indians. It was argued that the group of American Indians who had taken the livestock were distinct from any other American Indian tribal group, and therefore the Mescalero Apache American Indian tribe should not be held responsible for what had occurred.

After the hearing, the Supreme Court held that the judgment made previously in the Court of Claims would not be changed. This is to say that the Mescalero Apache American Indian tribe would not be held accountable for the actions of Victorio's Band. This outcome demonstrates the sovereignty of American Indian tribes from the United States, but also their sovereignty from one another. One group of American Indians cannot be held accountable for the actions of another group of American Indians, even though they are all part of the American Indian nation.

The case established a three-part legal definition of an American Indian tribe, sometimes called the Montoya definition:

1. A body of Indians of the same or similar race;
2. United in a community under one leadership or government;
3. Inhabiting a particular though sometimes ill-defined territory.

== Prior history ==
The case was filed with the United States Court of Claims on April 12, 1897; the Court of Claims dismissed the claim, with the opinion authored by Stanton J. Peelle.
