= Unkechaug Nation =

Cultural organization in Long Island, New York, U.S.

- Formation: 2014 (nonprofit)
- Founded at: Mastic, New York
- Type: 501(c)(3) Public Charity
- Tax ID no.: EIN: 80-0701013
- Headquarters: Mastic, New York
- Location: United States
- Official language: English
- Subsidiaries: Unkechaug Nation Community Development
- Website: unkechaug.wordpress.com

The Unkechaug Nation is a state-recognized tribe and non-profit organization in New York state. It is not recognized as a Native American tribe by the federal government. The Unkechaug Nation is based on the Poospatuck Reservation in Mastic, New York.

== Status ==
There is one federally recognized tribe on Long Island, the Shinnecock Indian Nation. The Unkechaug Nation is the sole state-recognized tribe in New York state. The Unkechaug Nation is not federally recognized.

In October of 2025, the Supreme Court of the United States declined to hear a fishing rights case brought by the Unkechaug Nation, leaving lower court rulings in place. The Unkechaug Nation argued that a 1676 agreement known as the Andros Order protected fishing rights for the Unkechaug Nation in New York state waters. A federal judge ruled against the Unkechaug Nation in 2023, ruling that the Andros Order was not federal law and as such did not override New York state regulations. In 2025, the Second Circuit Court of Appeals affirmed the ruling of the federal judge.

== Nonprofit organization ==
The Unkechaug Nation Community Development was incorporated as a 501(c)(3) public charity in 2014. They focus on "community and economic development" and are located in Mastic, New York.

== See also ==
- State-recognized tribes in the United States
- Native American recognition in the United States
