= Mastic, New York =

- Hamlet and census-designated place
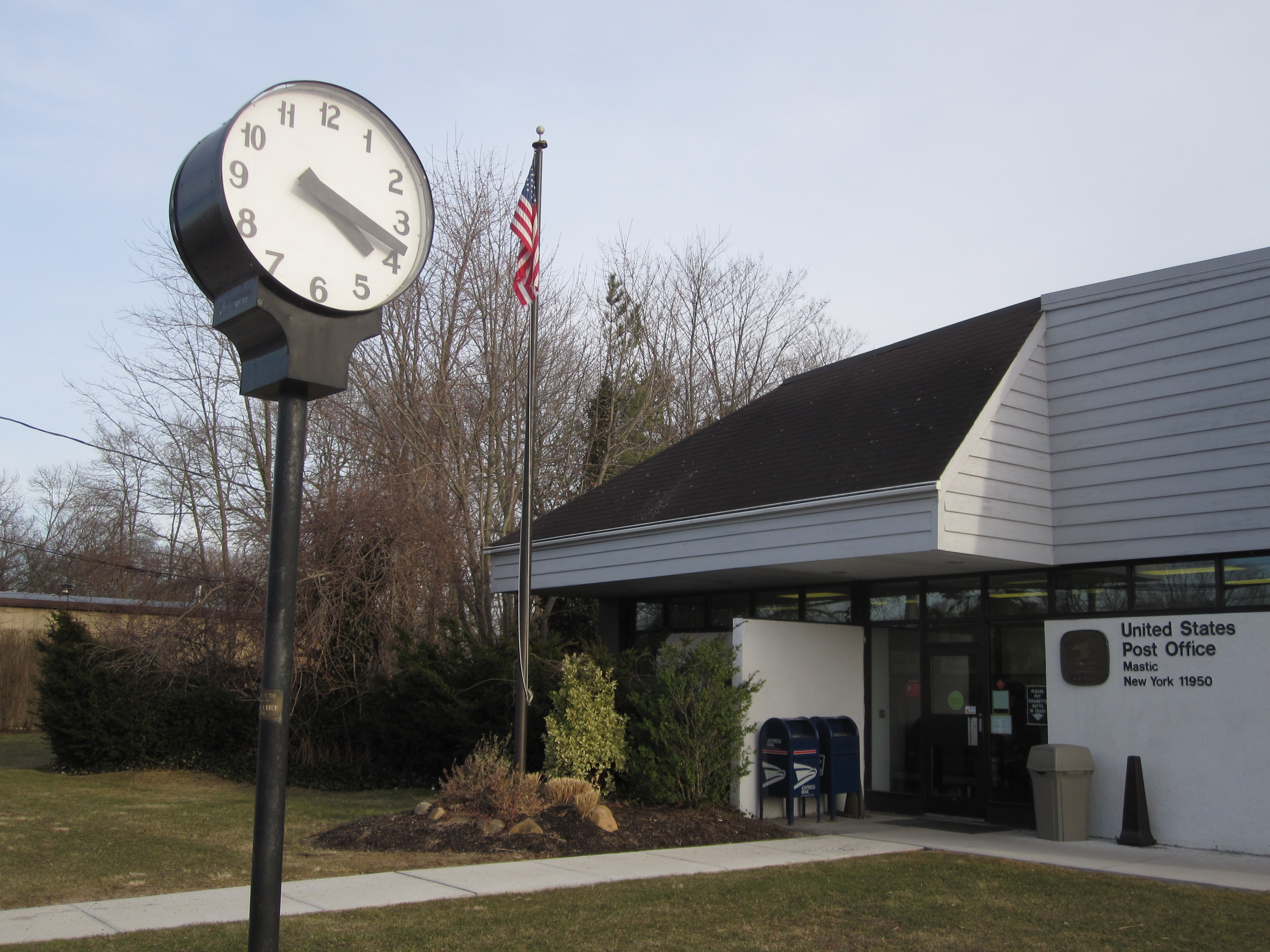
- Street clock in front of the Mastic Post Office on Montauk Highway

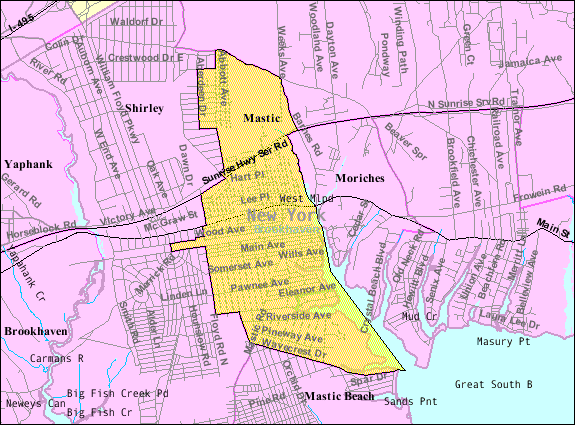

- Location within Long Island Location within New York
- Coordinates: 40°48′8″N 72°50′38″W
- Country: United States
- State: New York
- County: Suffolk

Area
  - Total: 3.95 sq mi (10.22 km^{2})
  - Land: 3.86 sq mi (10.00 km^{2})
  - Water: 0.085 sq mi (0.22 km^{2})
- Elevation: 30 ft (9 m)

Population (2020)
  - Total: 15,404
  - Density: 3,990.1/sq mi (1,540.59/km^{2})
- Time zone: UTC−05:00 (Eastern Time Zone)
  - Summer (DST): UTC−04:00
- ZIP Code: 11950
- Area codes: 631, 934
- FIPS code: 36-46074
- GNIS feature ID: 0970339

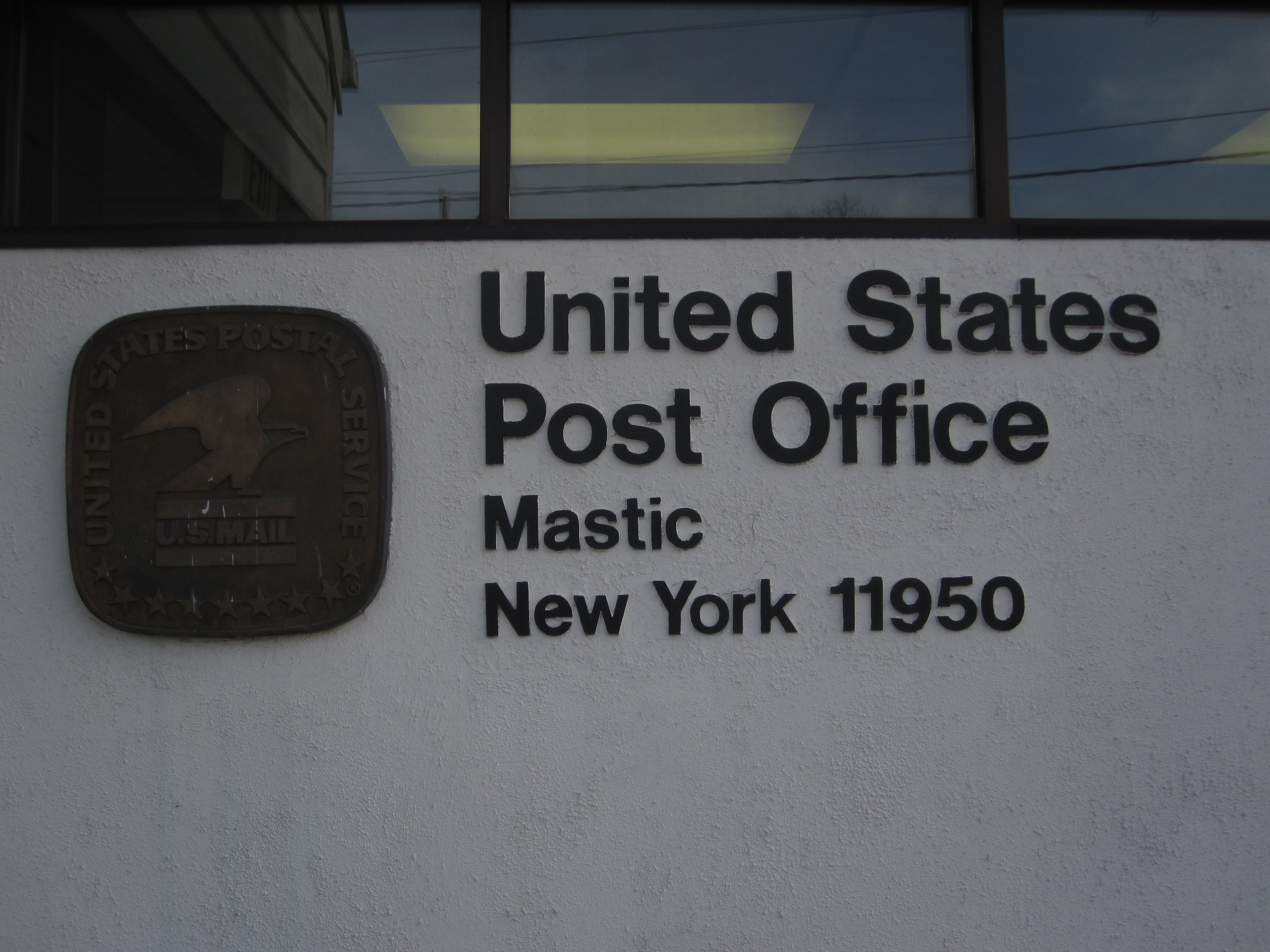
The ZIP Code on the wall of the Post Office.

Mastic is a hamlet and a census-designated place (CDP) in the southeastern part of the town of Brookhaven in central Suffolk County, New York, United States. As of the 2020 census, Mastic had a population of 15,404.

The hamlet was originally called Forge until 1893, when it was changed to the current name of Mastic. The Long Island Rail Road built a station in 1882 and, on July 15, 1960, the stop was moved 7,010 feet (2,140 m) west and renamed Mastic–Shirley.

The Poospatuck Indian Reservation of the state-recognized Unkechaug Nation lies entirely within the community, near its southern end and along the Forge River.

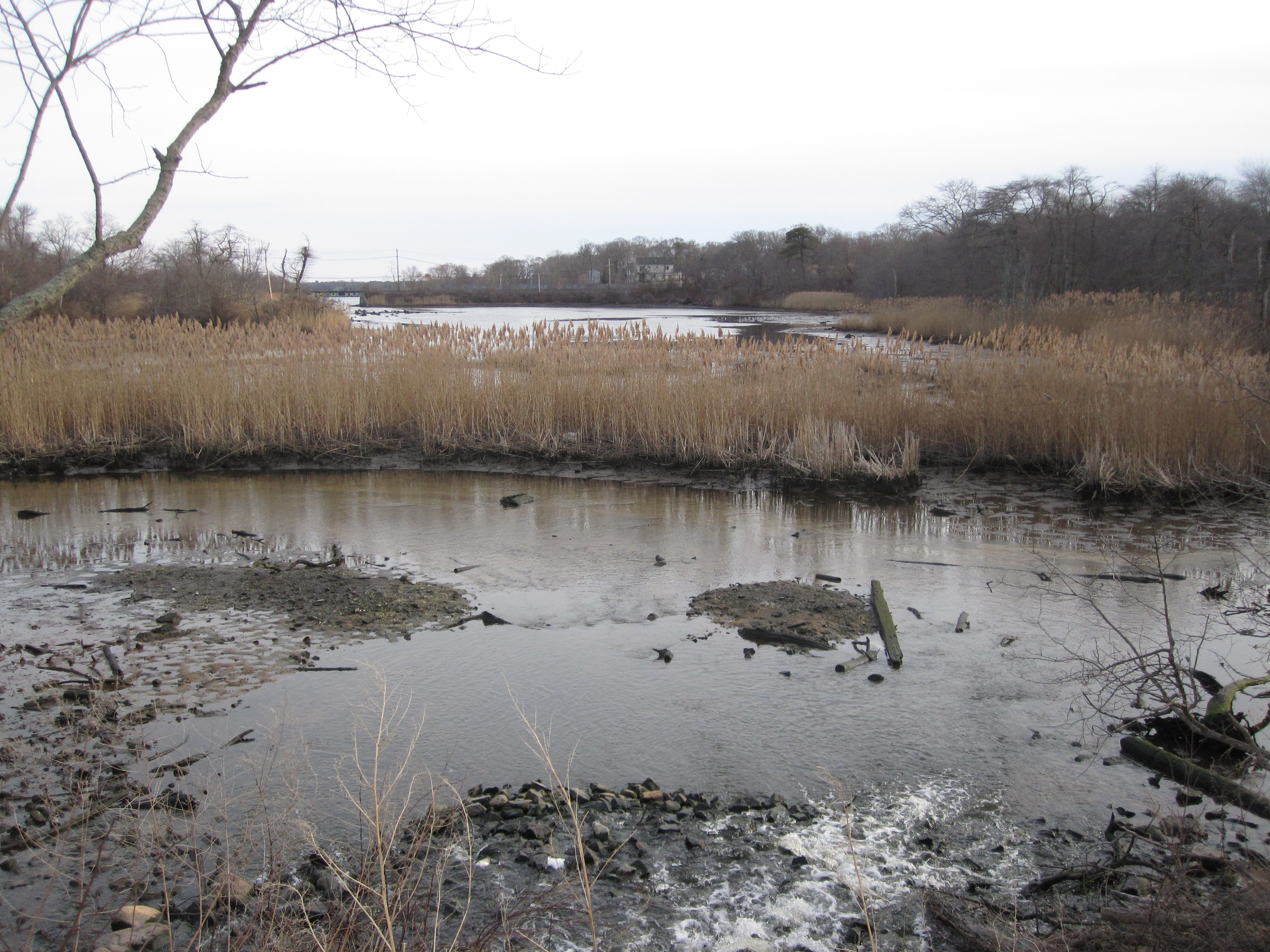
Forge River looking toward the Montauk Branch of the LIRR

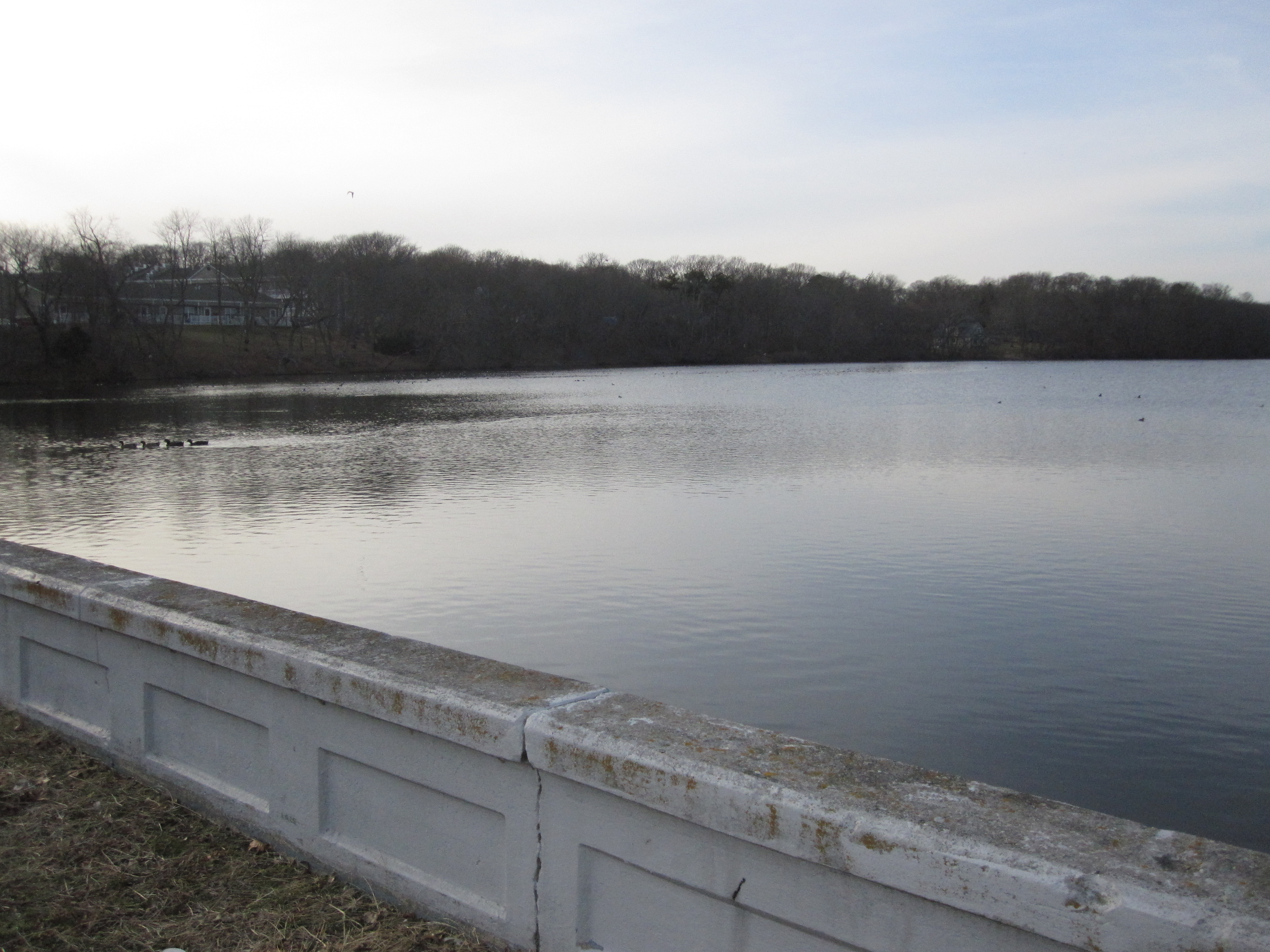
Forge River along Montauk Highway

The northernmost section of the hamlet is unofficially referred to as Manor Park, which stretches from Sunrise Highway to Moriches-Middle Island Road immediately east of Brookhaven Airport. Part of the neighborhood lies within the hamlet of Shirley, but is served entirely by Mastic's zip code of 11950.

== Geography ==
According to the United States Census Bureau, the CDP has a total area of 4.0 square miles (10.3 km^{2}), of which 3.9 square miles (10.1 km^{2}) is land and 0.08 square miles (0.2 km^{2}), or 2.13%, is water.

Historical population
Census	Pop.	Note	%±
2020	15,404		—
U.S. Decennial Census

== Demographics ==
=== 2020 census ===
As of the 2020 census, Mastic had a population of 15,404. The median age was 35.8 years. 24.3% of residents were under the age of 18 and 11.3% of residents were 65 years of age or older. For every 100 females there were 96.9 males, and for every 100 females age 18 and over there were 96.3 males age 18 and over.

99.9% of residents lived in urban areas, while 0.1% lived in rural areas.

There were 4,557 households in Mastic, of which 40.3% had children under the age of 18 living in them. Of all households, 53.9% were married-couple households, 14.5% were households with a male householder and no spouse or partner present, and 23.2% were households with a female householder and no spouse or partner present. About 14.7% of all households were made up of individuals and 6.1% had someone living alone who was 65 years of age or older.

There were 4,792 housing units, of which 4.9% were vacant. The homeowner vacancy rate was 1.5% and the rental vacancy rate was 4.4%.

Racial composition as of the 2020 census
Race	Number	Percent
White	8,959	58.2%
Black or African American	1,578	10.2%
American Indian and Alaska Native	105	0.7%
Asian	403	2.6%
Native Hawaiian and Other Pacific Islander	10	0.1%
Some other race	2,417	15.7%
Two or more races	1,932	12.5%
Hispanic or Latino (of any race)	4,605	29.9%

=== 2010 census ===
At the 2010 census there were 15,481 people, 4,526 households, and 3,743 families in the CDP. The population density was 3,969.5 inhabitants per square mile (1,532.6/km^{2}). There were 4,847 housing units at an average density of 1,242.8 per square mile (479.8/km^{2}). The racial makeup of the CDP was 46.1% White, 22.4% African American, 0.7% Native American, 2.1% Asian, 0.1% Pacific Islander, 7.2% some other race, and 4.3% from two or more races. Hispanic or Latino of any race were 21.8%.

There were 4,526 households, 48.8% had children under the age of 18 living with them, 57.7% were headed by married couples living together, 18.3% had a female householder with no husband present, and 17.3% were non-families. 12.4% of households were one person and 3.3% were someone living alone who was 65 or older. The average household size was 3.41, and the average family size was 3.63.

The age distribution was 28.3% under the age of 18, 10.9% from 18 to 24, 28.4% from 25 to 44, 26.1% from 45 to 64, and 6.3% 65 or older, and the median age was 33.1 years. For every 100 females, there were 100.1 males and for every 100 females age 18 and over, there were 97.7 males.

=== Income and poverty ===
From 2007 to 2011, the median annual income for a household in Mastic was $70,979, and the median family income was $79,839. Males had a median income of $51,315 versus $40,581 for females. The per capita income for the CDP was $26,176. About 18% of families and 22% of the population were below the poverty threshold, including 6.6% of those under age 18 and 6.0% of those age 65 or over.

== Education ==
Mastic is served mostly by the William Floyd School District, but also the Eastport-South Manor Central School District north of Grove Drive in the Manor Park section of the hamlet.

== Media ==
- Tri Hamlet News

== See also ==
- Forge River
- Moriches Bay
- Moriches Inlet
- Smith Point Bridge
