= Indigenous peoples of the Northeastern Woodlands =

Native peoples in Eastern Canada and Northeastern United States

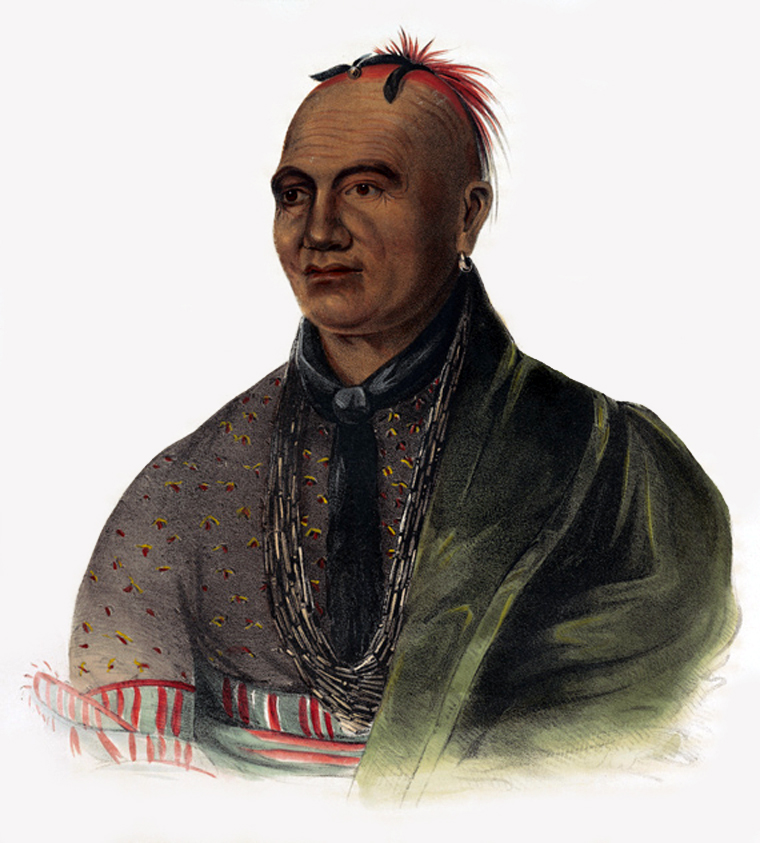
Joseph Brant, a Mohawk, depicted in a portrait by Charles Bird King, circa 1835

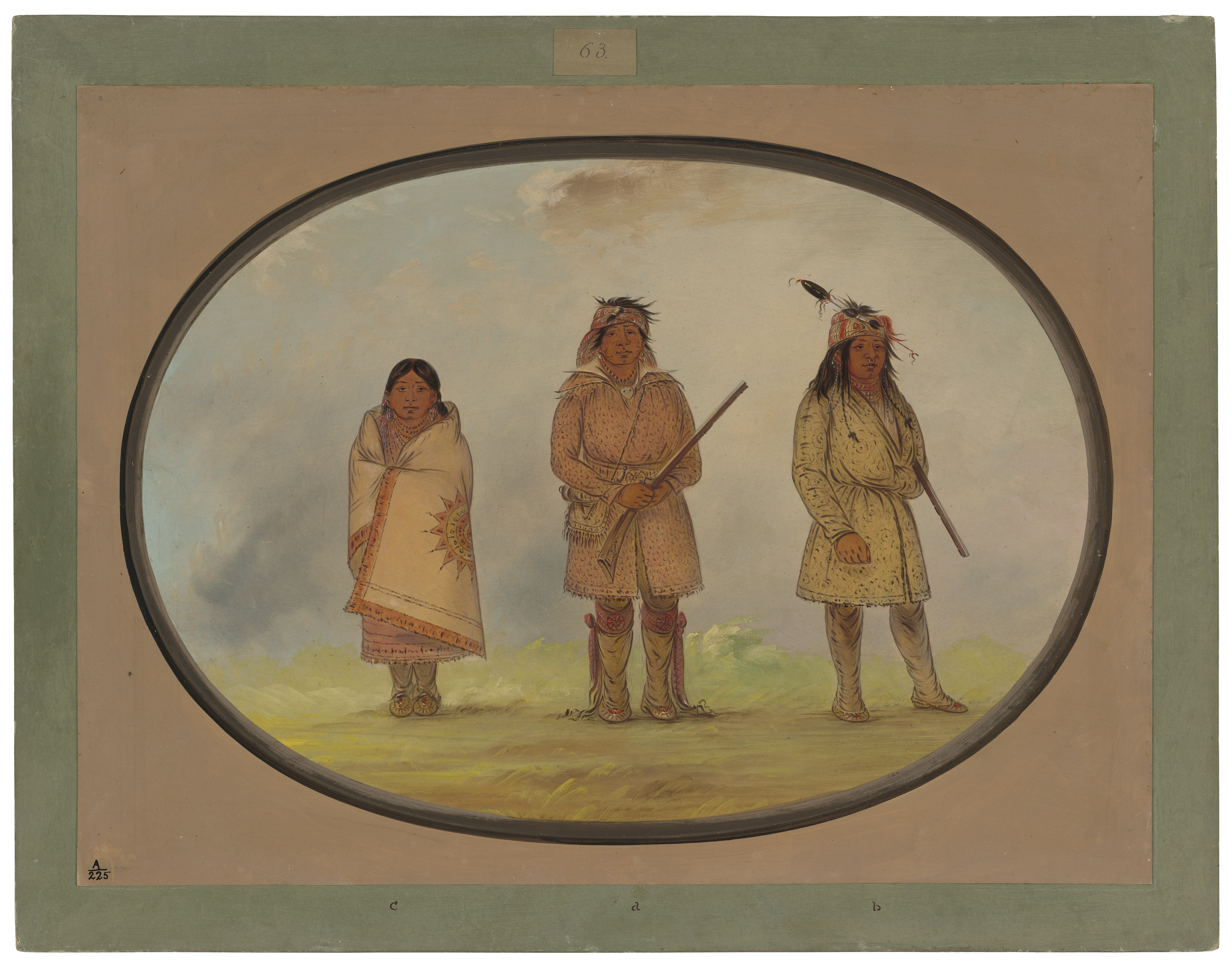
Three Lenape people, depicted in a painting by George Catlin in the 1860s, dressed in varied matchcoats.

Indigenous peoples of the Northeastern Woodlands include Native Americans and First Nations residing in or originating from a cultural area encompassing what is now the Northeastern United States, the Midwestern United States, parts of the Southern United States, and southeastern Canada. It is part of a broader grouping known as the Eastern Woodlands. The Northeastern Woodlands is divided into three major areas: the Coastal, Saint Lawrence Lowlands, and Great Lakes-Riverine zones.

The Coastal area includes the Atlantic Provinces in Canada, the Atlantic seaboard of the United States, south until North Carolina. The Saint Lawrence Lowlands area includes parts of Southern Ontario, upstate New York, much of the Saint Lawrence River area, and Susquehanna Valley. The Great Lakes-Riverine area includes the remaining inland areas of the northeast, home to Central Algonquian and Siouan speakers.

The Great Lakes region is sometimes considered a distinct cultural region, due to the large concentration of tribes in the area. The Northeastern Woodlands region is bound by the Subarctic to the north, the Great Plains to the west, and the Southeastern Woodlands to the south.

== History ==
A map of the Northeastern United States showing the demarcation between Iroquoian (green) and Algonquian (red) Indian tribes in present-day New Jersey, Pennsylvania, and New York state

Around 200 BCE the Hopewell culture began to develop across the Midwest of what is now the United States, with its epicenter in Ohio. The Hopewell culture was defined by its extensive trading system that connected communities throughout the Eastern region, from the Great Lakes to Florida. A sophisticated artwork style developed for its goods, depicting a multitude of animals such as deer, bears, and birds. The Hopewell culture is also noted for its impressive ceremonial sites, which typically contain a burial mound and geometric earthworks. The most notable of these sites is in the Scioto River Valley (from Columbus to Portsmouth, Ohio) and adjacent Paint Creek, centered on Chillicothe, Ohio. The Hopewell culture began to decline from around 400 CE for reasons which remain unclear.

By around 1100, the distinct Iroquoian-speaking and Algonquian-speaking cultures had developed in what would become New York State and New England. Prominent Algonquian tribes included the Abenakis, Mi'kmaq, Penobscot, Pequots, Mohegans, Narragansetts, Pocumtucks, and Wampanoag. The Mi'kmaq, Wolastoqiyik, Passamaquoddy, Abenaki, and Penobscot tribes formed the Wabanaki Confederacy in the seventeenth century. The Confederacy covered roughly most of present-day Maine in the United States, and New Brunswick, mainland Nova Scotia, Cape Breton Island, Prince Edward Island and some of Quebec south of the St. Lawrence River in Canada. The Western Abenaki live on lands in New Hampshire, Vermont, and Massachusetts of the United States.

The five nations of the Haudenosaunee League developed a powerful confederacy about the 15th century that controlled territory throughout present-day New York, into Pennsylvania and around the Great Lakes. The Iroquois confederacy or Haudenosaunee became the most powerful political grouping in the Northeastern woodlands, and still exists today. The confederacy consists of the Mohawk, Cayuga, Oneida, Onondaga, Seneca and Tuscarora tribes.

The area that is now the states of New Jersey and Delaware was inhabited by the Lenni-Lenape or Delaware, who were also an Algonquian people. Most Lenape were pushed out of their homeland in the 18th century by expanding European colonies, and now the majority of them live in Oklahoma.

== Culture ==
The characteristics of the Northeastern woodlands cultural area include the use of wigwams and longhouses for shelter and of wampum as a means of exchange. Wampum consisted of small beads made from quahog shells. Matchcoats are also extensively utilized.

The birchbark canoe was first used by the Algonquin Indians and its use later spread to other tribes and to early French explorers, missionaries and fur traders. The canoes were used for carrying goods, and for hunting, fishing, and warfare, and varied in length from about 4.5 metres (15 feet) to about 30 metres (100 feet) in length for some large war canoes.

The main agricultural crops of the region were the Three Sisters: winter squash, maize (corn), and climbing beans (usually tepary beans or common beans). Originating in Mesoamerica, these three crops were carried northward over centuries to many parts of North America. The three crops were normally planted together using a technique known as companion planting on flat-topped mounds of soil. The three crops were planted in this way as each benefits from the proximity of the others. The tall maize plants provide a structure for the beans to climb, while the beans provide nitrogen to the soil that benefits the other plants. Meanwhile, the squash spreads along the ground, blocking the sunlight to prevent weeds from growing and retaining moisture in the soil.

Prior to contact Native groups in the Northeast generally lived in villages of a few hundred people, living close to their crops. Generally men did the planting and harvesting, while women processed the crops. However, some settlements could be much bigger, such as Hochelaga (modern-day Montreal), which had a population of several thousand people, and Cahokia, which may have housed 20,000 residents between 1050 and 1150 CE.

For many tribes, the fundamental social group was a clan, which was often named after an animal such as turtle, bear, wolf or hawk. The totem animal concerned was considered sacred and had a special relationship with the members of the clan.

The spiritual beliefs of the Algonquians center around the concept of Manitou (/ˈmænɪtuː/), which is the spiritual and fundamental life force that is omnipresent. Manitou also manifest itself as the Great Spirit or Gitche Manitou, who is the creator and giver of all life.

== List of peoples ==
- Anishinaabeg (Anishinabe, Neshnabé, Nishnaabe) (see also Subarctic, Plains)
  - Algonquin, Quebec, Ontario
  - Nipissing, Ontario
  - Ojibwe (Chippewa, Ojibwa), Ontario, Michigan, Minnesota, and Wisconsin
    - Mississaugas, Ontario
    - Saulteaux (Nakawē), Ontario
  - Odawa people (Ottawa), Indiana, Michigan, Ohio, Ontario, also currently Oklahoma; later Oklahoma
  - Potawatomi, Illinois, Indiana, Michigan, Ontario, Wisconsin; also currently Kansas and Oklahoma
- Assateague, formerly Maryland
- Attawandaron (Neutral), Ontario
- Beothuk, formerly Newfoundland
- Chowanoke, formerly North Carolina
- Choptank people, formerly Maryland
- Erie, formerly Pennsylvania, New York
- Etchemin, Maine
- Haudenosaunee Confederacy (Iroquois), Ontario, Quebec, and New York
  - Cayuga, New York, Ontario, Oklahoma
  - Mohawk, New York, Ontario and Quebec
  - Oneida, New York, Ontario, and Wisconsin
  - Onondaga, New York, Ontario
  - Seneca, New York, Ontario, Oklahoma
    - Mingo, Pennsylvania, Ohio, West Virginia
  - Tuscarora, formerly North Carolina, currently New York and Ontario
- Ho-Chunk (Winnebago), southern Wisconsin, northern Illinois, later Iowa and Nebraska
- Honniasont, formerly Pennsylvania, Ohio, West Virginia
- Hopewell tradition, formerly Ohio, Illinois, and Kentucky, and Black River region, 200 BCE—500 CE
- Housatonic, formerly Massachusetts, New York
- Illinois Confederacy (Illiniwek), Illinois, Iowa, and Missouri; descendants in Oklahoma
  - Cahokia, Illinois, Iowa, Missouri, Arkansas, descendants in Oklahoma
  - Kaskaskia, formerly Wisconsin, descendants in Oklahoma
  - Mitchigamea, formerly Illinois
  - Peoria, Illinois, now Oklahoma
    - Moingona, formerly Illinois
  - Tamaroa, formerly Illinois
- Kickapoo, Michigan, Illinois, Missouri, now Kansas, Oklahoma, Texas, Mexico
- Laurentian (St. Lawrence Iroquoians), formerly New York, Ontario, and Quebec, 14th century—1580 CE
- Lenni Lenape (Delaware), Pennsylvania, Delaware, New Jersey, now Ontario and Oklahoma
  - Munsee-speaking subgroups, formerly Long Island and southeastern New York
    - Canarsie (Canarsee), formerly Long Island New York
    - Esopus, formerly New York, later Ontario and Wisconsin
    - Hackensack, formerly New York
    - Haverstraw (Rumachenanck), New York
    - Kitchawank (Kichtawanks, Kichtawank), New York
    - Minisink, formerly New York
    - Navasink, formerly to the east along the north shore of New Jersey
    - Raritan, formerly Westchester County, New York
    - Sinsink (Sintsink), formerly Westchester County, New York
    - Siwanoy, formerly Massachusetts
    - Tappan, formerly New York
    - Waoranecks
    - Wappinger (Wecquaesgeek, Nochpeem), formerly New York
    - Warranawankongs
    - Wiechquaeskeck, formerly New York
  - Unami-speaking subgroups
    - Acquackanonk, formerly Passaic River in northern New Jersey
    - Okehocking, formerly southeast Pennsylvania
    - Unalachtigo, Delaware, New Jersey
- Mahican (Stockbridge Mahican) Connecticut, Massachusetts, New York, and Vermont
- Manahoac, Virginia
- Mascouten, formerly Michigan
- Massachusett, formerly Massachusetts
  - Ponkapoag, formerly Massachusetts
- Meherrin, Virginia, North Carolina
- Menominee, Wisconsin
- Meskwaki (Fox), Michigan, now Iowa
- Miami, Illinois, Indiana, and Michigan, now Oklahoma
  - Piankeshaw, formerly Indiana, descendants in Oklahoma
  - Wea, formerly Indiana, descendants in Oklahoma
- Mohegan, Connecticut
- Monacan, Virginia
- Montaukett (Montauk people), New York
- Monyton (Monetons, Monekot, Moheton) (Siouan), West Virginia and Virginia
- Nansemond, Virginia
- Nanticoke, Delaware and Maryland
  - Accohannock
- Narragansett, Rhode Island
- Niantic, coastal Connecticut
- Nipmuc (Nipmuck), Connecticut, Massachusetts, and Rhode Island
- Noquet, formerly Michigan
- Nottaway, Virginia
- Occaneechi (Occaneechee), Virginia
- Pamplico, North Carolina
- Patuxent, Maryland
- Paugussett, Connecticut
  - Potatuck, New York
- Pawtucket, Massachusetts, New Hampshire
  - Naumkeag, Massachusetts
- Pequot, Connecticut
- Petun (Tionontate), Ontario
- Piscataway (Conoy), Maryland, Virginia
- Pocumtuc, western Massachusetts
- Podunk, New York, eastern Hartford County, Connecticut
- Powhatan Confederacy, Virginia
  - Appomattoc, Virginia
  - Arrohateck, Virginia
  - Chesapeake, Virginia
  - Chesepian, Virginia
  - Chickahominy, Virginia
  - Kiskiack, Virginia
  - Mattaponi, Virginia
  - Nansemond, Virginia
  - Pamunkey, Virginia
  - Paspahegh, Virginia
  - Powhatan, Virginia
- Quinnipiac, Connecticut, eastern New York, northern New Jersey
- Rappahannock, Virginia
- Sauk (Sac), Michigan, now Iowa and Oklahoma
- Schaghticoke, western Connecticut
- Secotan Outerbanks, North Carolina
  - Croatan
  - Dasamongueponke
  - Roanoke people
- Shawnee, formerly Ohio, Virginia, West Virginia, Pennsylvania, Kentucky, Tennessee, currently Oklahoma
- Shinnecock, Long Island, New York
- Stegarake, Virginia
- Stuckanox (Stukanox), Virginia
- Conestoga (Susquehannock), Maryland, Pennsylvania, New York, West Virginia
- Tauxenent (Doeg), Virginia
- Tunxis, Connecticut
- Tuscarora, formerly North Carolina, Virginia, currently New York
- Tutelo (Nahyssan), Virginia
- Unquachog (Poospatuck), Long Island, New York
- Wabanaki Confederacy, Maine, New Brunswick, Nova Scotia, Quebec
  - Abenaki (Tarrantine), Quebec, Maine, New Brunswick, Vermont and New Hampshire
    - Eastern Abenaki, Quebec, Maine, New Hampshire
      - Androscoggin, formerly Androscoggin Valley in Maine and New Hampshire; later Saint-François-du-Lac, Quebec
      - Kennebec (Caniba), Maine
    - Pequawket (Pigwacket), Maine and New Hampshire
    - Western Abenaki: Quebec, Massachusetts, New Hampshire and Vermont
      - Pennacook, Massachusetts, New Hampshire
      - Cowasuck, upper Connecticut River Valley, in Vermont
      - Missiquoi, Missisquoi Valley, from Lake Champlain to the headwaters, in Vermont, and Massachusetts
  - Mi'kmaq (Micmac), New Brunswick, Newfoundland and Labrador, Nova Scotia, Prince Edward Island, Quebec, and Maine
  - Passamaquoddy, New Brunswick, Nova Scotia, Quebec, and Maine
  - Penobscot, Maine
  - Wolastoqiyik (Maliseet), Maine, New Brunswick, Nova Scotia, and Quebec
- Wampanoag, Massachusetts
  - Nauset, Massachusetts
  - Patuxet, Massachusetts
  - Pokanoket, Massachusetts, Rhode Island
- Wangunk, Mattabeset, Connecticut
- Wenro, New York
- Wicocomico, Maryland, Virginia
- Wyachtonok, Connecticut, New York
- Wyandot (Huron), Ontario south of Georgian Bay, now Oklahoma, Kansas, Michigan, and Wendake, Quebec

== United States federally recognized tribes ==
1. Absentee-Shawnee Tribe of Indians of Oklahoma
2. Bad River Band of the Lake Superior Tribe of Chippewa Indians of the Bad River Reservation, Wisconsin
3. Bay Mills Indian Community, Michigan
4. Cayuga Nation of New York
5. Chickahominy people, Virginia
6. Chippewa-Cree Indians of the Rocky Boy’s Reservation, Montana
7. Citizen Potawatomi Nation, Oklahoma
8. Delaware Nation, Oklahoma
9. Delaware Tribe of Indians, Oklahoma
10. Eastern Chickahominy, Virginia
11. Eastern Shawnee Tribe of Oklahoma
12. Forest County Potawatomi Community, Wisconsin
13. Grand Traverse Band of Ottawa and Chippewa Indians, Michigan
14. Hannahville Indian Community, Michigan
15. Ho-Chunk Nation of Wisconsin, Minnesota, Wisconsin
16. Houlton Band of Maliseet Indians of Maine
17. Iowa Tribe of Kansas and Nebraska, also considered a Great Plains tribe
18. Iowa Tribe of Oklahoma, also considered a Great Plains tribe
19. Keweenaw Bay Indian Community, Michigan
20. Kickapoo Traditional Tribe of Texas
21. Kickapoo Tribe of Indians of the Kickapoo Reservation in Kansas
22. Kickapoo Tribe of Oklahoma
23. Lac Courte Oreilles Band of Lake Superior Chippewa Indians of Wisconsin
24. Lac du Flambeau Band of Lake Superior Chippewa Indians of the Lac du Flambeau Reservation of Wisconsin
25. Lac Vieux Desert Band of Lake Superior Chippewa Indians, Michigan
26. Little River Band of Ottawa Indians, Michigan
27. Little Traverse Bay Bands of Odawa Indians, Michigan
28. Mashantucket Pequot Tribe of Connecticut
29. Mashpee Wampanoag Tribe, Massachusetts
30. Match-e-be-nash-she-wish Band of Pottawatomi Indians of Michigan
31. Menominee Indian Tribe of Wisconsin
32. Miami Tribe of Oklahoma
33. Mi'kmaq Nation, Maine
34. Minnesota Chippewa Tribe, Minnesota
  Six component reservations:
  1. Bois Forte Band (Nett Lake)
  2. Fond du Lac Band, Minnesota, Wisconsin
  3. Grand Portage Band
  4. Leech Lake Band
  5. Mille Lacs Band
  6. White Earth Band
35. Mohegan Indian Tribe of Connecticut
36. Monacan, Virginia
37. Nansemond, Virginia
38. Narragansett Indian Tribe of Rhode Island
39. Nottawaseppi Huron Band of the Potawatomi, Michigan
40. Oneida Nation of New York
41. Oneida Tribe of Indians of Wisconsin
42. Onondaga Nation of New York
43. Ottawa Tribe of Oklahoma
44. Pamunkey, Virginia
45. Passamaquoddy Tribe of Maine
46. Penobscot Tribe of Maine
47. Peoria Tribe of Indians of Oklahoma
48. Pokagon Band of Potawatomi Indians, Michigan, Indiana
49. Prairie Band of Potawatomi Nation, Kansas
50. Prairie Island Indian Community in the State of Minnesota
51. Rappahannock, Virginia
52. Red Cliff Band of Lake Superior Chippewa Indians of Wisconsin
53. Red Lake Band of Chippewa Indians, Minnesota
54. Sac and Fox Nation, Oklahoma
55. Sac and Fox Nation of Missouri in Kansas and Nebraska
56. Saginaw Chippewa Indian Tribe of Michigan
57. St. Croix Chippewa Indians of Wisconsin
58. Saint Regis Mohawk Tribe, New York
59. Sault Ste. Marie Tribe of Chippewa Indians of Michigan
60. Seneca-Cayuga Tribe of Oklahoma
61. Seneca Nation of New York
62. Shawnee Tribe, Oklahoma
63. Shinnecock Nation, New York
64. Sokaogon Chippewa Community, Wisconsin
65. Stockbridge Munsee Community, Wisconsin
66. Tonawanda Band of Seneca Indians of New York
67. Turtle Mountain Band of Chippewa Indians of North Dakota, Montana, North Dakota
68. Tuscarora Nation of New York
69. Wampanoag Tribe of Gay Head (Aquinnah) of Massachusetts
70. Winnebago Tribe of Nebraska

== See also ==
- Classification of indigenous peoples of the Americas
- Hopewell tradition
- Native American tribes in Massachusetts
- Southern New England Algonquian cuisine
- Three Sisters (agriculture)
- War of 1812
