= Poospatuck Reservation =

Poospatuck Reservation, New York
- Reservation
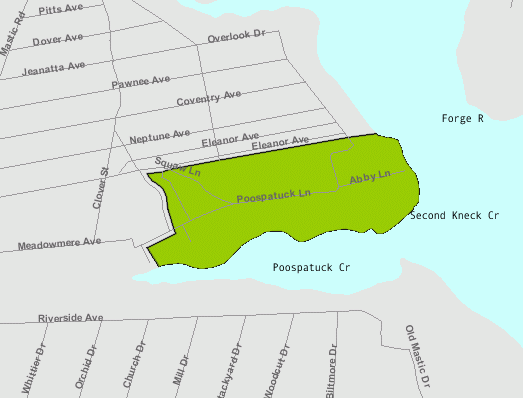
- Map of Poospatuck Reservation

- Location of Poospatuck Reservation
- Coordinates: 40°47′23″N 72°49′58″W
- Country: United States
- State: New York
- County: Suffolk

Area
  - Land: 0.1130 sq mi (0.2927 km^{2})
  - Water: 0.0562 sq mi (0.1456 km^{2})
- Elevation: 17 ft (5.2 m)

Population (2020)
  - Total: 436
  - Density: 3,858/sq mi (1,489.6/km^{2})
- Time zone: UTC-5 (Eastern (EST))
  - Summer (DST): UTC-4 (EDT)
- ZIP code: 11950
- Area codes: 631, 934
- GNIS feature ID: 979384
- Website: https://www.shinnecock-nsn.gov

The Poospatuck Reservation is a Native American reservation of the state-recognized Unkechaug Nation in the community of Mastic, Suffolk County, New York, United States. It is one of two Native American reservations in Suffolk County, the other being the Shinnecock Reservation of the federally recognized Shinnecock Indian Nation. The population was 436 at the 2020 census.

The Unkechaugi are descendants of the Quiripi-speaking Native Americans, who occupied much of southern New England and central Long Island at the time of European encounter in the colonial era. Historically they spoke an Algonquian language. Many Unkechaugi have intermarried with African Americans. They have retained a community; the reservation is the smallest in New York State. The current 55 acre reservation was originally set aside for the Unkechaugs as a 175-acre plot by William "Tangier" Smith after he purchased large tracts of land from Unkechaug John Mayhew in 1691. It is located in Mastic on the north side of Poospatuck Creek, on the east side of Poospatuck Lane, and south of Eleanor Avenue. Poospatuck is situated in the southeast corner of Suffolk County's present-day Town of Brookhaven; and is the township's sole Indian reservation. On account of the innumerable tobacco shops, the reservation is known synecdochally as "Mastic Boges" by those in neighboring towns. It is about 70 miles or 1½ hours east of New York City.

The reservation and its people are recognized as Native American by the state of New York but it has not received federal recognition from the US Bureau of Indian Affairs. However, the Unkechaug Nation established that it met the criteria of a Tribe as set out in the Supreme Court case Montoya v. United States, 180 U.S. 261, 266 (1901). The Unkechaug Nation proved beyond a preponderance of the evidence that they met the criteria of a common law definition of a tribe consisting of the following:

1. A body of Indians of the same or similar race;
2. United in a community under one leadership or government;
3. Inhabiting a particular though sometimes ill-defined territory.

In a 2009 case, federal District Judge Kiyo Matsumoto held that the Unkechaug Nation satisfied all 3 Montoya criteria thereby entitling the Unkechaug Nation to Sovereign Immunity from lawsuits because they are a federal Tribe under federal common law.

== Geography ==
According to the United States Census Bureau, the Indian reservation has a land area of 72.3 acres (0.293 km^{2}), and a water area of 36 acres (0.15 km^{2}). The reservation reports the size of the reservation is actually 55 acres (0.22 km^{2}).

== Demographics ==
Historical population
Census	Pop.	Note	%±
1970	125		—
1980	203		62.4%
1990	136		−33.0%
2000	271		99.3%
2010	324		19.6%
2020	436		34.6%
U.S. Decennial Census

As of the census of 2000, there were 271 people, 93 households, and 67 families residing in the Indian reservation. The population density was 3,040.9/mi^{2} (1,162.6/km^{2}). There were 100 housing units at an average density of 1,122.1 inhabitants/mi^{2} (429.0 inhabitants/km^{2}). The racial makeup of the Indian reservation was 1.48% White, 12.92% African American, 79.34% Native American (mostly Unkechaug Nation people), no Asians, no Pacific Islanders, 0.74% from other races, and 5.54% from two or more races. 4.80% of the population were Hispanic or Latino of any race.

There were 93 households, out of which 47.3% had children under the age of 18 living with them, 29.0% were married couples living together, 32.3% had a woman whose husband does not live with her, and 26.9% were non-families. 24.7% of all households were made up of individuals, and 2.2% had someone living alone who was 65 years of age or older. The average household size was 2.91 and the average family size was 3.51.

In the Indian reservation the population was spread out, with 36.5% under the age of 18, 10.0% from 18 to 24, 30.3% from 25 to 44, 17.3% from 45 to 64, and 5.9% who were 65 years of age or older. The median age was 27 years. For every 100 females, there were 78.3 males. For every 100 females age 18 and over, there were 79.2 males.

The median income for a household in the Indian reservation was $13,125, and the median income for a family was $17,500. Males had a median income of $47,500 versus $20,250 for females. The per capita income for the Indian reservation was $8,127. 36.6% of the population and 36.8% of families were below the poverty line. Out of the total people living in poverty, 46.6% were under the age of 18 and 25.0% were 65 or older.

== See also ==
- Indigenous peoples of Long Island
- Indigenous peoples of New York (state)
- State-recognized tribes in the United States
