= Shinnecock Reservation =

Shinnecock Reservation, New York
- Indian Reservation
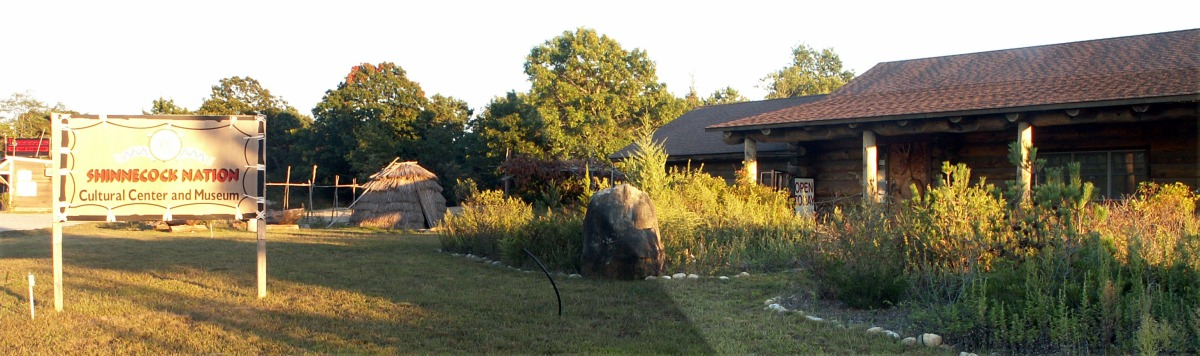
- The Shinnecock Nation Cultural Center and Museum in 2007

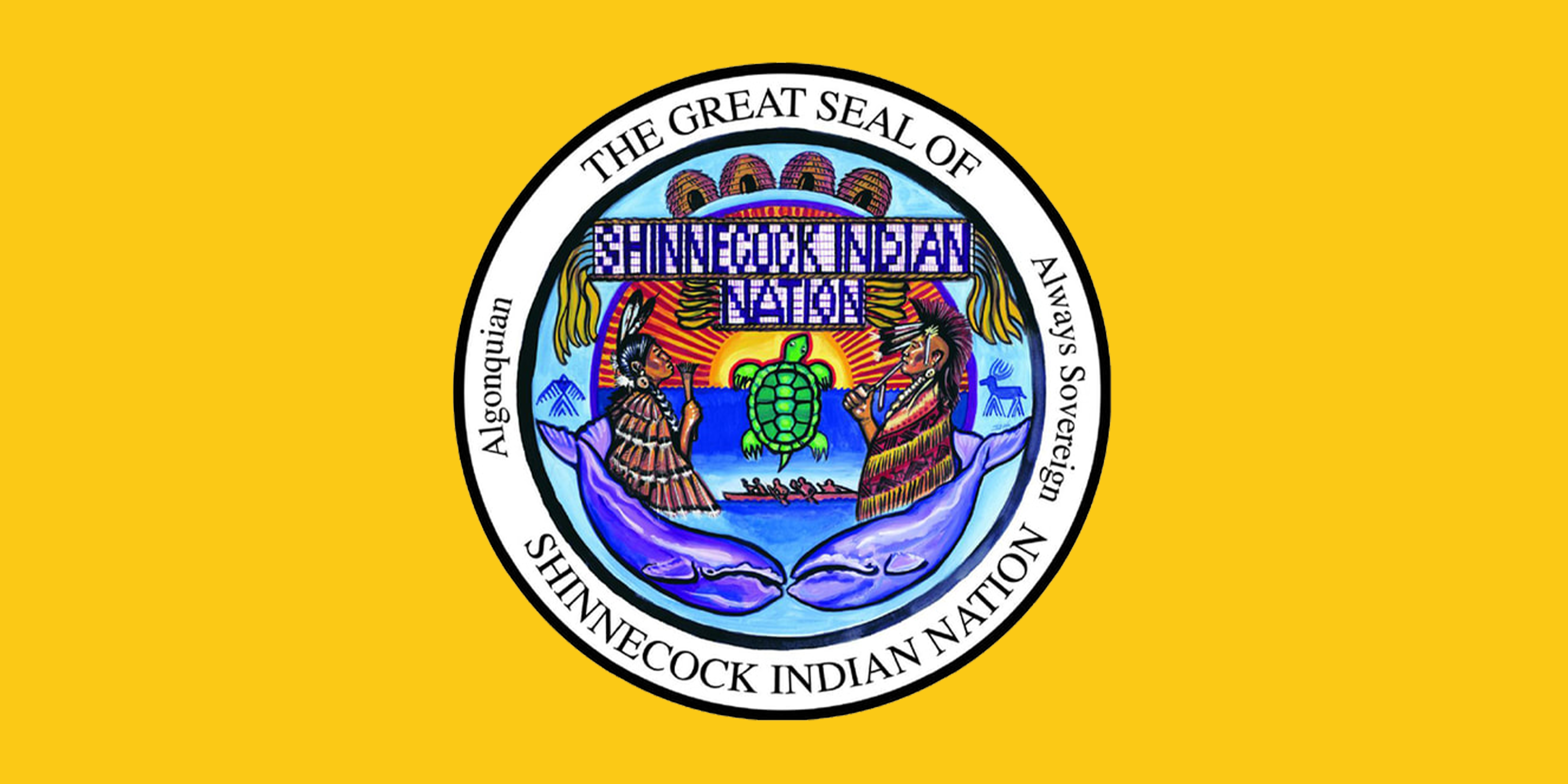
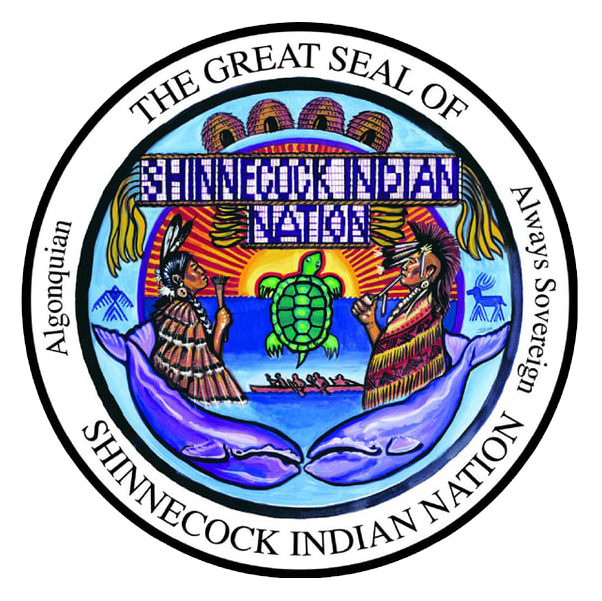
- Flag Seal

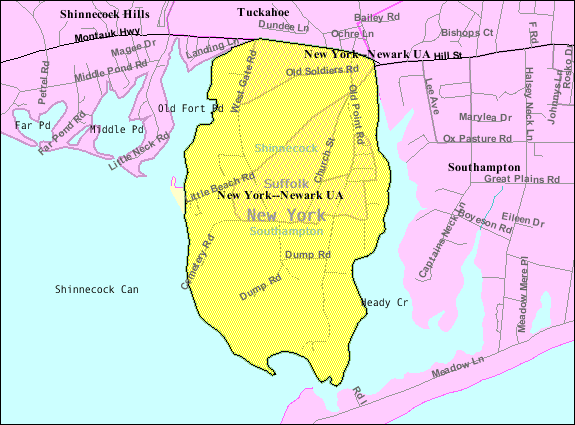
- Map of Shinnecock Reservation

- Location within the state of New York
- Coordinates: 40°52′28″N 72°25′54″W
- Country: United States
- State: New York
- County: Suffolk
- Established: 1859

Area
  - Total: 1.3 sq mi (3.4 km^{2})
  - Land: 1.3 sq mi (3.4 km^{2})
  - Water: 0 sq mi (0.0 km^{2})
- Elevation: 203 ft (62 m)

Population (2020)
  - Total: 819
  - Density: 627/sq mi (241.9/km^{2})
- Time zone: UTC-5 (Eastern (EST))
  - Summer (DST): UTC-4 (EDT)
- ZIP code: 11968
- Area code: 631

Shinnecock Reservation is a Native American reservation for members of the Shinnecock Indian Nation in the town of Southampton in Suffolk County, New York, United States. It is the most easterly of the two Native American reservations in Suffolk County; the other being the Poospatuck Reservation of the state-recognized Unkechaug Nation in the town of Brookhaven. It lies on the east side of Shinnecock Bay on southeastern Long Island, near Tuckahoe, Shinnecock Hills, and the village of Southampton. The population was 819 as of the 2020 census. Around the same number of tribe members live off the reservation.

== Geography ==
According to the United States Census Bureau, the Indian reservation has a total area of 1.3073 mi^{2} (3.3859 km^{2}), all land.

== Demographics ==
Historical population
Census	Pop.	Note	%±
1910	171		—
1920	112		−34.5%
1930	194		73.2%
1940	156		−19.6%
1950	183		17.3%
1960	234		27.9%
1970	174		−25.6%
1980	297		70.7%
1990	375		26.3%
2000	504		34.4%
2010	662		31.3%
2020	819		23.7%
U.S. Decennial Census

At the 2010 census there were 662 people and 256 households in the Indian reservation. The population density was 506.4/mi^{2} (195.5/km^{2}). There were 204 housing units at an average density of 156.0/mi^{2} (60.2/km^{2}). The racial makeup of the Indian reservation was 6.04% White, 4.53% Black or African American, 76.59% Native American, 0.45% Asian, 0.03% from other races, and 12.08% from two or more races.

Of the 256 households 36.3% had children under the age of 18 living with them, 11.7% are vacant, 8.6% are for rent.

The age distribution was 24.5% under the age of 18, 4.2% from 18 to 20, 7.4% from 20 to 24, 11.3% from 25 to 34, 18.7% from 35 to 49, 21.3% from 50 to 64, and 12.5% 65 or older. For every 100 females, there were 88.1 males.

According to the 2000 Census, the median household income was in the Indian reservation was $14,055, and the median income for a family was $14,143. Males had a median income of $28,750 versus $13,750 for females. The per capita income for the Indian reservation was $8,843. About 61.3% of families and 50.6% of the population were below the poverty line, including 66.1% of those under age 18 and none of those age 65 or over.

== Tribal recognition and gambling prospects ==
The Shinnecock Nation formally requested federal recognition from the United States government in 1978 and received it in 2010. Recognition was supported by New York Governor David Paterson.

This enabled the tribe to move forward with its plans for a casino; it has already been discussing this with the state and local governments. Opposition to additional casinos in the New York market is based in part on dilution of demand: both the Foxwoods Casino in Connecticut and those in Atlantic City, New Jersey, attract thousands of New Yorkers, and Aqueduct Racetrack opened a casino in 2011, and its proximity to the wealthy and powerful located in the neighboring Hamptons communities of the South Fork.

The Nation has been in discussion with state and local officials on plans to build a Class III casino, as it wants to generate revenues for economic development and welfare for the tribe. It would share revenues with the state for such an enterprise off the reservation. The tribe and other parties prefer a location out of the Hamptons area, which is already bogged down with heavy traffic during the summer season, when the population of the Town of Southampton doubles. In addition, they would face heavy competition on eastern Long Island, as New Yorkers make up 30% of the customers of the highly successful Mohegan Sun and Foxwoods Casinos in Connecticut.

The Shinnecock Indian Nation and their partners (Gateway Casino Resorts, LLC and Michael J. Malik Sr. dba MJM Enterprises and MJM Enterprises & Development) paid D.C. lobbyists $1,140,000 from 2005 to 2009 to support their effort to gain recognition and approved gaming.
