= Shinnecock Indian Nation =

Federally recognized Native American tribe of Long Island, New York

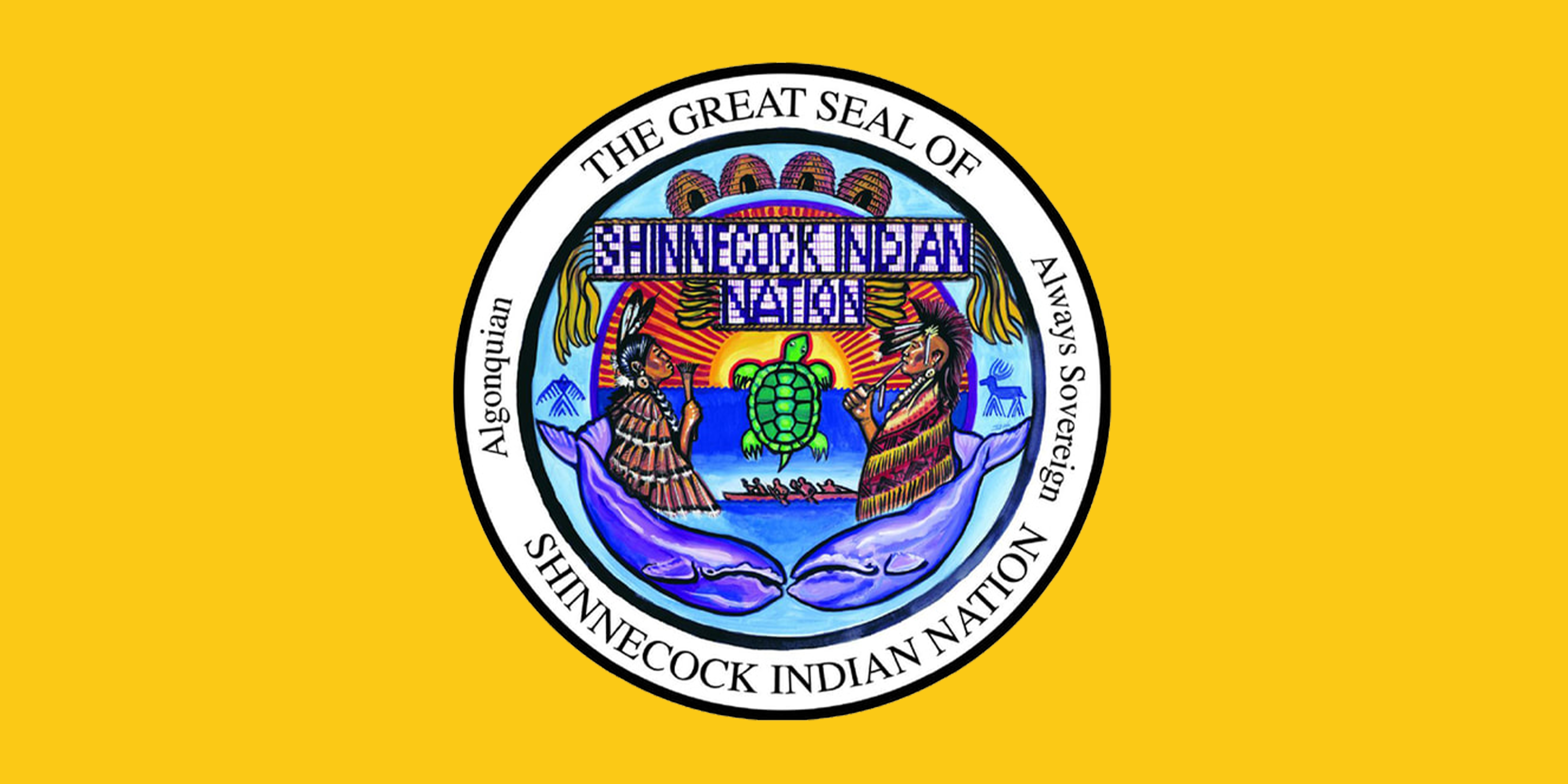
- Flag of the Shinnecock people

Total population
- 1,292 enrolled members

Regions with significant populations
- United States (Long Island)

Languages
- English, formerly: Mohegan-Pequot

Religion
- Christianity, Traditional beliefs

Related ethnic groups
- Montaukett, Pequot, Narragansett, and other Eastern Algonquians

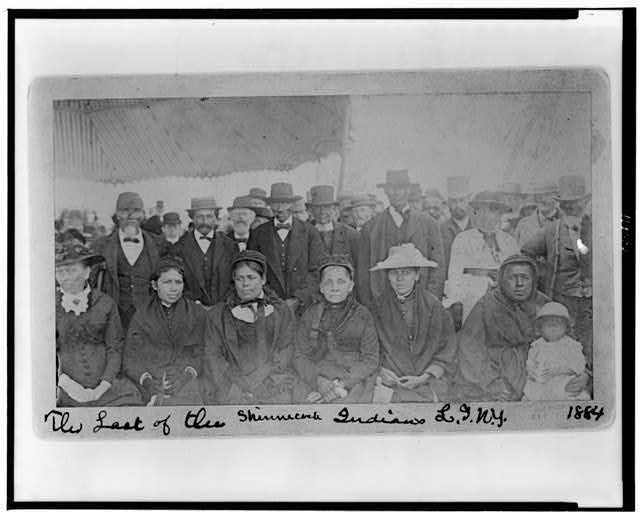
The handwritten caption says "The last of the Shinnecock Indians L.I., N.Y. 1884"

The Shinnecock Indian Nation is a federally recognized tribe of historically Algonquian-speaking Native Americans based at the eastern end of Long Island, New York. This tribe is headquartered in Suffolk County, on the southeastern shore. Since the mid-19th century, the tribe's landbase is the Shinnecock Reservation within the geographic boundaries of the Town of Southampton. Their name roughly translates into English as "people of the stony shore".

== History ==
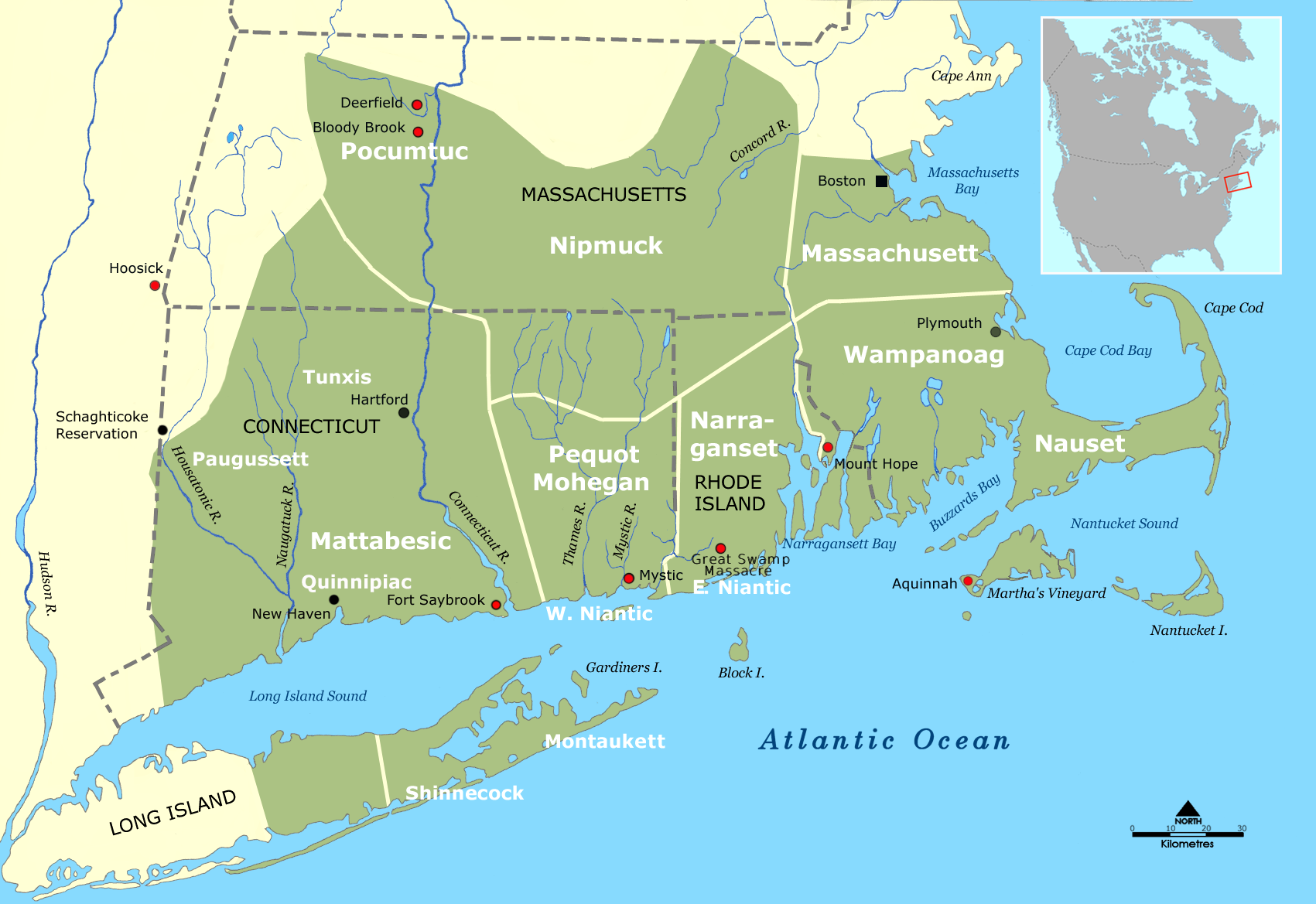
The Shinnecock and neighboring tribal bands

The Shinnecock are Indigenous to Long Island. The most common pattern of Indigenous life on Long Island prior to their economic and cultural disruption — and, on occasion, actual enslavement — by the Europeans was the autonomous village linked by kinship to its neighbors. They were related and politically subject to the Pequot and Narragansett, the more powerful Algonquian tribes of southern New England across Long Island Sound. The Shinnecock are believed to have spoken a dialect of Mohegan-Pequot-Montauk, similar to their neighbors the Montaukett on Long Island. As is the case with many North Eastern tribes after the establishment of reservations, the Shinnecock language was not allowed to be spoken in schools and its use was highly frowned upon off the reservation. This caused a decline in the number of people who spoke the language, the tribe is actively engaged in language renewal programs to secure the legacy of the language for future generations.

The bands in the western part of Long Island were Lenape (Delaware), such as the Matinecock and Patchogue. Also part of the large Algonquian languages family, these Lenape spoke a Delaware-Munsee dialect, one of three of their people. They shared a longhouse social system with their people also located in a territory that extended through the mid-Atlantic area, from western Connecticut, the lower Hudson River Valley, through present-day New Jersey, Delaware and Pennsylvania.

Like the other Native peoples of Long Island, the Shinnecock made wampumpeag (wampum), shell beads strung onto threads that were used as currency, for record-keeping, for aesthetic purposes, and to symbolize a family. These shell beads have been found at Native American-inhabited sites as far west as the Rocky Mountains, showing their value in a trade. Although other New England tribes produced wampumpeag, the Indians of Long Island are reputed to have made the best. Paumanok, one of the many names given to Long Island, means "land of tribute". The tribe was subject to raids by the Pequot and other New England tribes to control this valuable trade commodity. The Europeans quickly learned the value of the Shinnecock wampumpeag in a trade with other tribes. Cockenoe, a Montaukett/Shinnecock captured during the Pequot War in 1637, worked with John Eliot in Boston in the 1640s to translate the first parts of the Eliot Indian Bible, before returning to Long Island.

Native American populations on Long Island declined dramatically after European colonization due mostly to vulnerability to the new infectious diseases carried by colonists, to which they had no immunity. In 1658 a smallpox epidemic caused the deaths of nearly two-thirds of the Indians on the island. In addition, their communities were disrupted by land encroachment by Dutch and later English colonists; they had to shift from hunting and fishing to horticulture. By 1741, estimates are that only 400 Native Americans in total survived.

In 1641, English colonists signed a lease with the Shinnecock Indians. In 1703, this was ratified to include more land for English colonists. In 1792, the state of New York passed a law reorganizing the Shinnecock Indian Tribe as a trusteeship. The law also established annual elections for three tribal trustees, which have continued from 1792 to the present. The Shinnecock, Montauk and Unkechaug developed tribal systems to deal with external forces; the Shinnecock depended on their trustees to manage some relations with local farmers in the 18th century, and with other jurisdictions in contemporary times. For more than two centuries, the trustees have managed the tribe's land and resources. In the fall of 2010, the Shinnecock gained federal recognition.

After the American Revolutionary War, a number of Shinnecock left Long Island to join the Brothertown Indians in western New York, where the Oneida people gave them some land on their reservation. (By the mid-19th century the Shinnecock and Brothertown migrated to Wisconsin, pushed out of New York.) On Long Island, some Shinnecock intermarried with local colonists and enslaved Africans, who worked on farms and as craftsmen. They often reared their children as Shinnecock, maintaining their identity and culture.

The Shinnecock were at home on the water, long being fishermen and sailors around the island. Through the 19th century, Shinnecock men worked as fishermen and sailors on the whaling ships based at Sag Harbor and other local ports. It was said that not a ship left Eastern Long Island without at least 1 Shinnecock male on board. In December 1876, ten Shinnecock men died while trying to save a ship stranded off East Hampton. The tribe is famous in local lore for such heroic efforts. At the start of the 20th century, the Shinnecock were described as "daring seamen," and "furnishin[g] efficient recruits to the United States Life Saving Service" (Coast Guard).

== Modern history ==
In 1994, women gained the right to vote on tribal issues. The 1972 tribal leadership restructuring did not include this.

Due to a history of intermarriage between Black and Shinnecock people, many citizens of the Shinnecock Indian Nation have African ancestry.

=== Land claims dispute ===
In 2005 the nation filed a land claim against New York seeking the return of 3,500 acres (14 km^{2}) in Southampton located near the tribe's reservation, and billions of dollars in reparations for damages suffered by colonial land grabs. The disputed property is worth $1 billion and includes the Shinnecock Hills Golf Club, which Shinnecock say is the location of traditional tribal burial grounds.

The tribe's lawsuit challenged the state legislature's approval of an 1859 sale of the 3,500 acres (1,400 ha) of tribal land to non-native persons. This broke the terms of a 1,000-year-lease signed in 1703 by Southampton colonial officials and the tribe. The suit charges that in 1859, a group of powerful New York investors conspired to break the lease by sending the state Legislature a fraudulent petition supporting the sale, which was purported to be from a number of Shinnecock tribal members. Although other tribal members immediately protested that the petition was a forgery, the Legislature approved the sale of 3,500 acres (14 km^{2}) of tribal land.

=== Casino proposals ===
In 2007 the tribe proposed building a gaming casino to generate revenues for welfare and education, but it has not proceeded to development. In negotiations with the state and local government, the Nation agrees a location out of the Hamptons area would be better for the environment. If they develop a site in partnership with the state, they could build a Class III gaming casino, which is more lucrative than the Class II they would qualify for on their reservation.

=== Federal recognition ===
Avery Dennis Sr., also known as Chief Eagle Eye, was a proponent of Shinnecock sovereignty. The Shinnecock were recognized by the United States government in October 2010 after a more than 30-year effort, which included suing the Department of Interior. The Acting Principal Deputy Assistant Secretary of Indian Affairs, George T. Skibine issued the final determination of the tribe's recognized status on June 13, 2010. The first Secretary of the Interior to visit the Shinnecock Indian Reservation was Sally Jewell, who visited in 2015. She was joined by Kevin K. Washburn, the Assistant Secretary of Indian Affairs. One of the purposes of the visit was to highlight renewable energy initiatives.

== Reservation ==
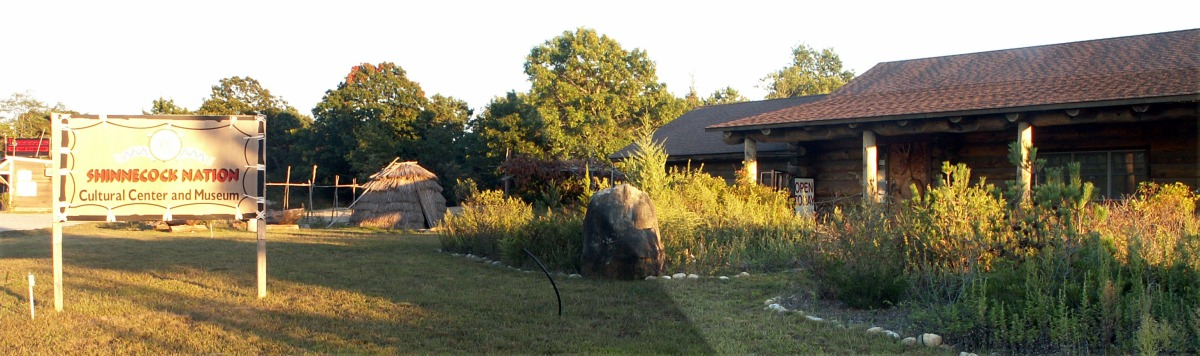
Cultural Center and Museum in Southampton

The Shinnecock Indian Reservation is a self-governing reservation. By 1859, the current borders of 800 acres (3.2 km^{2}) were established.

The reservation has a museum, shellfish hatchery, education center, cultural and community center, playground, and Presbyterian church. The reservation is three miles (5 km) west of the village of Southampton, New York. In 1903, it had a population of 150. In 2012 the Shinnecock Nation numbered more than 1,400 people, with more than half residing on the reservation.

In 2024, Lisa Goree became the first woman chair of the Shinnecock Nation Council of Trustees.

== Culture ==
=== Whaling ===
The commercial whaling fishery in the United States is thought to have begun in the 1650s with a series of contracts between Southampton resident English settlers John Ogden, John Cooper and the Shinnecock Indians.The English settlers were primarily farmers at that time with very little experience on the seas. The Indians had an expertise at both seamanship and whale hunting which were necessary to commercialize the industry, known as "the whale design".

The skill of the hunters had a direct impact on the number of whales harvested in a season, as a result, Shinnecock men were often contracted by the whaling companies months in advance and for years at a time. This arrangement was wildly successful, and the whale fishery was soon seen all over New England. So valued were the Indian fisherman that in 1708 the governor made a law stating, “Indians under indenture to whaling companies could not be arrested, molested, or detained in any way from November first to April fifteenth”. This version of whale fishing continued with Indian contract labor until at least 1746.

The whaling industry declined sharply in the mid-1700s. Whales were no longer found near shore in their former abundance. The hunt for whales went worldwide, and the Shinnecock were still very valued within the industry well into the 1800s. On April 18, 1845 aboard the whaling vessel the Manhattan, a Shinnecock Indian named Eleazar became the first Native American to enter into Japanese territory, anchoring in Tokyo Bay.

=== Wampum ===
The Shinnecock Indians are very closely tied to wampum. In the early 1600s, the first recorded European reference of Long Island Indians comes from Dutch official Isaack de Rasieres. He described Long Island as, "three to four leagues broad, and it has several creeks and bays, where many savages dwell, who support themselves by planting maize and making sewan (wampum) and who are called… Sinnecox (Shinnecock)."

The Long Island Indians are generally thought to be the largest producers of wampum in the colonial era with much of it being paid as tribute to larger or more powerful tribes. As wampum manufacturing grew during the 1600s, it became an official currency of the colonies until the early 18th century and it was the primary currency used in the fur trade of the time. The need for wampum was so great that the Shinnecock and other Long Island Indians were included in the 1664 free trade treaty of Fort Albany as a means to secure unrestricted wampum from the Indians.

The Shinnecock and neighboring Long Island tribes were keen to secure their access to the resource through treaties. In 1648, the Shinnecock, Montauk, Manhasset and Corchaug tribes sold land which would become the Town of East Hampton, New York. The treaty states, "(the tribes) reserve libertie to fish in all convenient places, for Shells to make wampum".

=== Powwow ===
Every Labor Day Weekend since 1946, the reservation hosts a powwow, based on ceremonies beginning in 1912. The Shinnecock Powwow is ranked by USA Today as one of the ten great powwows held in the United States. In 2008, the powwow attracted 50,000 visitors.

=== Cultural Coalition ===
In 1972 the Shinnecock Native American Cultural Coalition (SNACC) was formed to establish a Native American arts and crafts program. Traditional dancing, beadwork, Native American crafts, and music are studied. A group called The Youngblood Singers was formed. Dedicated to learning traditional Algonquian songs, chants, and drum rituals, they travel throughout the Northeast performing at powwows and drum contests. The Cultural Enrichment Program is a sharing and learning process that the community has engaged in to ensure that the ideals and traditions of their ancestors are passed down through the generations. It involves sharing knowledge of food, clothing, arts, crafts, dance, ceremonies, and language.

== In popular culture ==
In 2019 a documentary film entitled "Conscience Point" was released and shown on WNET in New York City and other PBS stations. It documents the struggle for land rights and protection of Shinnecock ancestral burials over a five-year period and features Shinnecock activist Becky Hill-Genia.

Evidence of Shinnecock influence on the industry can still be seen today. A bull rake is a large clam harvesting tool created in the mid-1800s. It also goes by the name of a "Shinnecock rake".

=== Fiction ===
In the Netflix series Manifest, a passenger on Flight 828 is a member of the Shinnecock Indian Nation.
