= Pee Dee Lumbee =

Mixed-race ethnic group in South Carolina

Pee Dee Lumbee Pee Dee, Pee Dees
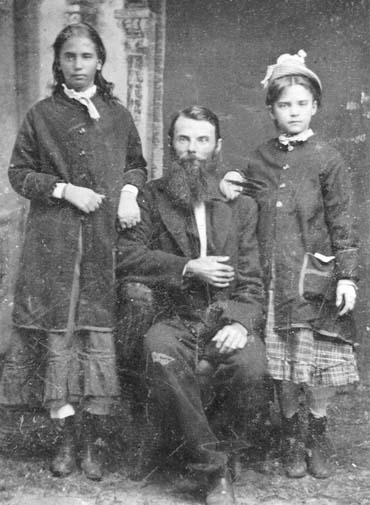
- Caroline Bennett, husband William Rainwater, and daughter of Chesterfield, c. 19th century. Bennett has been claimed to be of Pee Dee and Cheraw ancestry.

Total population
- 1,716 (2000, census)
- 1990 (census): 1,244
- 1981 (est.): 2,000
- 1977 (est.): 2,000

Regions with significant populations
- United States ( South Carolina); Pee Dee Region (Dillon, Marlboro, Marion, Chesterfield, Horry)

Languages
- English

Religion
- Christianity (Baptist, Methodist)

Related ethnic groups
- Lumbee, Melungeons, Louisiana Redbones, Dominickers, Carmelites, Chestnut Ridge people, Free Black people, Atlantic Creoles, Free people of color, African Americans, English Americans, Scottish Americans, Scotch-Irish Americans

The Pee Dee Lumbee, Pee Dee, or Pee Dees, are a group of interrelated communities of Lumbee descent in northeastern South Carolina, along the North Carolina–South Carolina border, located in Dillon, Marlboro, Marion, Chesterfield, and Horry County. Their ancestors were Lumbees from Robeson County, North Carolina, who migrated across state lines into South Carolina during the 19th century. The geographical designation "Pee Dee" originates from the Great and Little Pee Dee rivers.

Since the early 1990s, genealogical and ethnohistorical research has generally discredited a link between the Pee Dee Lumbee and the historic Pedee people, who confederated with the Catawba Nation during the colonial period, though some advocates continue to propose a connection between the two groups. The federally recognized Lumbee Tribe of North Carolina commonly claim to be descended from numerous Indigenous peoples of the Southeastern Woodlands, including the Pedee and Cheraw.

During the late 20th century, the Lumbee Regional Development Association helped organize Lumbee communities in the Pee Dee to promote the general welfare of families in the region. By the early 21st century, some of these communities adopted Pee Dee tribal identity and later obtained independent state-recognition in South Carolina. Descendants of Lumbee individuals in the Pee Dee region recorded in the 1910 United States census of Dillon County and the 1900 United States census of Marion County remain eligible for Lumbee tribal enrollment.

Members of a state-recognized tribe, the Pee Dee Indian Nation of Upper South Carolina, have identified as Pee Dee Lumbee.

== History ==
=== Origins ===
Theories concerning the origins of the Pee Dees of South Carolina, have included proposed descent from the historic Pedee people, as well as from other Native groups of the Carolinas, including the Saponi, Cheraw, and Tuscarora. Researcher and ethnohistorian Wes Taukchiray traced a number of Pee Dee region families to nineteenth-century migrants from Robeson County, North Carolina indicating common genealogical origins with the Lumbee people. Regarding the Pee Dee of South Carolina as part of the larger North Carolina-derived population, he reportedly theorized that some Lumbee ancestors were Cheraw people who migrated to the Lumber River within about fifteen years after 1763, having previously lived at Cheraw Town, near present-day Cheraw, South Carolina, along the Great Pee Dee River.

Prior to the federal recognition of the Lumbee Tribe of North Carolina on December 18, 2025, through the National Defense Authorization Act for Fiscal Year 2026, supporters of Lumbee recognition cited descent from the historic Pee Dee and Cheraw. In 2006, during a U.S. Senate hearing on a prior Lumbee Recognition Act, Representative Mike McIntyre stated that, “Included among those Native Americans were both the Cheraw and Pee Dee Indians, who are direct ancestors of the Lumbee Tribe.”

The Lumbee Tribe's claims of descent from Indigenous peoples of the Southeastern Woodlands have been disputed by some historians, genealogists, and leaders of other federally recognized tribes. Present-day genealogical research has traced some of the earliest documented Lumbee ancestors to Tidewater Virginia.

=== "Croatans" ===
Dillon County is located just across the North Carolina-South Carolina state line from Robeson County, North Carolina, where the Lumbee Tribe of North Carolina is located. In 1885, the North Carolina State Legislature recognized the ancestors of the Lumbee people as the "Croatan Indians of Robeson County". They were named after the Croatan, also called the Hatteras, an historic Native American tribe who ceased to exist as a tribe by the mid-18th century.

The "Croatan Indians of Robeson County" was renamed several times, being later called the "Indians of Robeson County" in 1911, and the "Cherokee Indians of Robeson County" in 1913. The name Lumbee was not officially adopted until the 1950s. In 1910, 6,000 "Croatan Indians" were enumerated within the United States census, making them the seventh-largest Indigenous group in the country. Most of the "Croatan Indians" lived in Robeson County, but other smaller groups lived in neighboring counties, including across the border in Dillon.

In the 1910 U.S. federal census, 77 people were recorded as "Indian" in Dillon County, with the majority of the county having African American and white residents. It was common at the time for some members of the "Croatan" community to be designated as "mulatto" rather than "Indian" in the census, resulting in figures less than the community's actual size. However, local newspapers in Dillon County often specified members as "Croatan," such as "Esau Locklear, a Croatan," or John Miller, who was noted as "an Old Croatan".

In 1925, a "Croatan" community of about 30 farming families was documented in the sandhills of northern Marlboro County, South Carolina. The members claimed "their Indian blood from the Cheraw Indians, a branch of the Cherokee Indians, that live in and around Roberson [sic] County, North Carolina". The members of the community, while usually isolated, occasionally visited nearby Cheraw, South Carolina.

==== Marlboro Blues ====
In 1945, sociologist Brewton Berry reported that the moniker “Marlboro Blues” was being locally used for a small group in Chesterfield County said to have originated in neighboring Marlboro County. The name "Marlboro Blues" was said to be a disparaging reference to neighboring Marlboro County, from where the group first originated. In the same report, Berry identified similar communities in Marlboro, Dillon, Marion, and Horry counties as "Croatans". Scholar Renate Bartl also related the communities in 2021

==== Lumbee Act ====
In 1956, Congress formally designated the ethnic group as the “Lumbee Indians of North Carolina” through the Lumbee Act.

== Organization ==
In April 1976, representatives of Pee Dee Lumbee communities in Dillon, Marlboro, and Marion counties testified before the American Indian Policy Review Commission in Pembroke, North Carolina, describing poor housing conditions, limited educational opportunities, and inadequate access to services in the Pee Dee region of South Carolina. Representatives of the Lumbee Regional Development Association (LRDA), accompanied by the Rev. Bob Mangum, subsequently visited the area and reported many Lumbee families tenant farming in exchange for housing, with low levels of education among adults. Concern over conditions in the region led representatives from North and South Carolina to meet with the executive assistant to Governor James B. Edwards regarding the status and needs of Lumbee communities in the state.

=== Regional organization ===
In December 1976, communities in Dillon, Marlboro, and Marion counties organized the Pee Dee Lumbee Indian Association to represent Lumbee families in South Carolina and seek services intended to improve their general welfare. The organization received assistance from the LRDA, the Coalition of Eastern Native Americans, and the Cumberland County Association for Indian People, as well as donations of food and clothing from groups, including the Piscataway in Maryland.

In 1978, Pee Dee Lumbee communities in northeastern South Carolina were noted to have included Leland Grove in the northern tip of Dillon County, Sardis Community next to Latta and bordering into Marion County, as well as a group centered around Wallace. In the late 1970s, the governor’s office identified the Pee Dee among South Carolina’s major Native American groups and supported efforts to organize and provide services to the major communities in the state. The Council of Native Americans, a nonprofit organization established in 1979, initially led by Lumbee activist Grace Lowry, in the 1980s became an important intermediary for Pee Dees and others, administering grants and employment programs funded first through the CETA and later through the JTPA.

=== Organizational division ===
Photographer Gene Crediford reported that during the 1980s, the Pee Dee were still represented by a single organization, the Pee Dee Indian Association, formerly known as the Pee Dee Lumbee Indian Association, which included a “vice-chief” or “sub-chief” for Dillon County. By 1992, the Pee Dee Lumbee communities were divided organizationally. Those living near McColl in Marlboro County were represented by the Pee Dee Indian Association. A recently formed Marion-Dillon Indian Association represented communities in Marion and Dillon counties, including the Sardis Community near Latta. By 2005, the association had divided into multiple Pee Dee organizations.

The LRDA continued to recognize genealogical ties between Lumbee families in North and South Carolina during this period.

== State-recognized tribes ==
In 2005, after pursuing state-recognition for three years, the Pee Dee Indian Nation of Upper South Carolina, whose members are primarily associated with the Dillon community, with a few also living in Marlboro, were recognized as a tribe in South Carolina. The group is separate from the McColl-based Pee Dee Indian Association, formerly known as the Pee Dee Lumbee Indian Association, which received independent state-recognition in 2006 as the Pee Dee Indian Tribe of South Carolina.

== Population ==
In the 2000 census, 1,716 American Indians were reported in the tri-county area of Marlboro, Dillon, and Marion counties, where most Pee Dee communities are concentrated, compared to 1,244 in 1990. In McColl, 350 residents identified as American Indian in 2000, representing about 14% of the town's population of 2,498.

The total Pee Dee Lumbee population is uncertain and may be undercounted in official records. This has been noted as being likely owed to poverty, rural isolation, and efforts to racially pass to avoid discrimination. The increase between 1990 and 2000 has been attributed to increased pride and assertion of Native American identity in the region.

=== SDTSA areas ===
Since obtaining state recognition, the two recognized Pee Dee tribes in South Carolina have been assigned State Designated Tribal Statistical Areas (SDTSA). SDTSAs are Census Bureau statistical entities established for state-recognized tribes that lack a state-recognized land base or reservation. Their boundaries are identified and delineated by a state liaison designated by the governor’s office. The two areas include:

- Pee Dee SDTSA
- Upper South Carolina Pee Dee SDTSA

== Surnames ==
The surnames Locklear, Chavis, and Cumbo have traditionally been associated with families in South Carolina. The surname Cumbo reportedly disappeared from the community in the early twentieth century. The names Brayboy and Lowery have also been noted among the Pee Dee Lumbee.

== See also ==
- List of notable Lumbee
- Waccamaw Indian People
- Brandywine people
  - Piscataway Indian Nation and Tayac Territory
  - Piscataway-Conoy Tribe of Maryland
- Brass Ankles
  - Wassamasaw Tribe of Varnertown Indians
- Delaware Moors
  - Lenape Indian Tribe of Delaware
  - Nanticoke Indian Association
  - Nanticoke Lenni-Lenape Tribal Nation
- Dominickers
- Melungeons
  - Carmel Melungeons
- Emanuel Cumbo
- Chavis family
- Free Black people
