= Racial isolates in the United States =

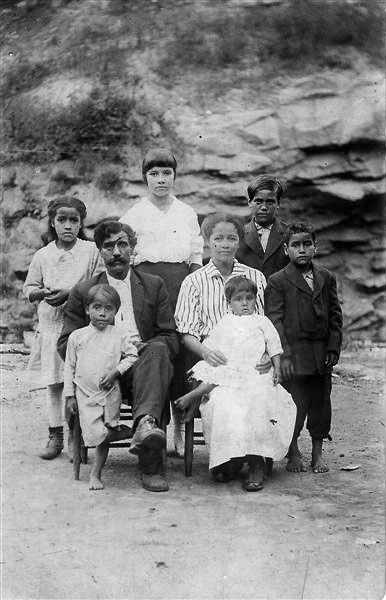
- Arch Goins and family, Melungeons from Graysville, Tennessee, c. 1920s.

Regions with significant populations
- United States; Atlantic Seaboard and American Southeast

Languages
- American English

Religion
- Predominantly Christianity

Racial isolates in the United States, also variously known as tri-racial isolates, biracial isolates, or American isolates, is a term used by anthropologists to classify approximately two hundred distinct mixed-race communities, traditionally speculated to be of African-American, European-American, and Native American ancestry, located along the Atlantic Seaboard and throughout the American Southeast. The veracity of Native American ancestry claimed among some racial isolate communities has been questioned in recent years with advances in genealogical and genetic research. Historically, some members of isolate communities, particularly those in Appalachia, claimed Portuguese or Spanish, sometimes collectively termed as "Moorish", ancestry to explain their appearances.

Groups that have been described as racial isolates include the Melungeons, Carmelites, Delaware Moors, Brandywine people, Lumbee, Brass Ankles, Chestnut Ridge people, Dominickers, and Alabama Cajans, among others.

Some descendants of the Lumbee, comprising the Lumbee Tribe of North Carolina, have been federally recognized as a Native American tribe through Congressional legislation first advanced through executive order and later into law by President Donald Trump. Other descendants of racial isolate communities have been state-recognized as Native American tribes by certain state governments, including the Lenape Indian Tribe of Delaware and the Nanticoke Indian Association of Delaware, the Wassamasaw Tribe of Varnertown Indians in South Carolina, the Piscataway-Conoy Tribe of Maryland and Piscataway Indian Nation and Tayac Territory in Maryland, the MOWA Band of Choctaw Indians in Alabama, and the Nanticoke Lenni-Lenape Tribal Nation and Ramapough Mountain Indians in New Jersey.

== About ==
There are approximately 200 groups of racial isolates in the Eastern United States, with most being in the Southeast. Because there is no single unified group and because "racial isolate" or "triracial isolate" is a term used by social science, some members of these groups reject the terminology. Common features of groups characterized as racial isolates often include claiming a mix of African, European, and Native American ancestry as well as living in geographically isolated small towns and rural areas. Members of racial isolates often intermarried with fellow group members, rather than with outsiders who were Black or white.

The Native American ancestry claims of racial isolate descendants have often been questioned, including Lumbee claims of Native American ancestry. Many people are of both Black and Native American ancestry, including many Black Seminoles. Unlike the contested identity claims of the Lumbee and other racial isolate communities, the identity of these Black Indians, including Black Seminoles, is not contested.

=== Alabama Cajans ===
The Alabama Cajans are a mixed-race group in Alabama of free Black, white, Creole, and possible Native American ancestry. A portion of their descendants intermarried with and integrated into white communities, while some other descendants have been recognized in Alabama as the MOWA Band of Choctaw Indians.

=== Brandywine people ===
The Brandywine people of Southern Maryland descend from free African Americans and European Americans. Some also assert ancestry from the Piscataway people. The Brandywine people were sometimes referred to as "Wesorts" (also spelled "We-sorts"), although the term is commonly considered derogatory or as a pejorative.

Two groups descended from the Brandywine people have been recognized as tribes by the State of Maryland: the Piscataway Indian Nation and Tayac Territory and the Piscataway-Conoy Tribe of Maryland. Neither group has been federally recognized as a tribe.

=== Delaware Moors ===
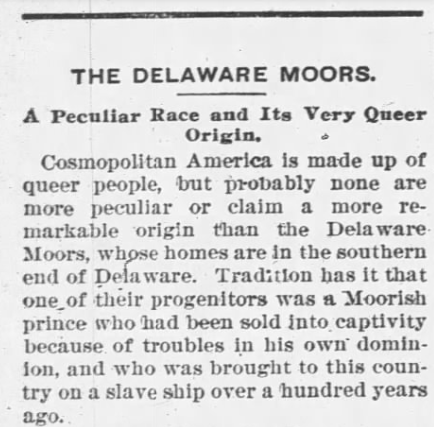
Article about the Delaware Moors in The Pick and Gad of Shullsburg, Wisconsin, December 26, 1895.

The Delaware Moors are a mixed-race group of mostly African and European descent living in Delaware, with an off-shoot group that later moved to southern New Jersey. Historically classified as African Americans, the State of Delaware reclassified them as a separate, non-Black group in 1914. Some descendants of the Delaware Moors became members of state-recognized tribes, including the Nanticoke Lenni-Lenape Tribal Nation in New Jersey, the Nanticoke Indian Association of Delaware, and the Lenape Indian Tribe of Delaware.

=== Dominickers ===
The Dominickers were a small biracial ethnic group in the Florida Panhandle during the late 1800s and the mid-1900s. They were of mixed African and European ancestry.

=== Lumbee ===
The Lumbee people are a racial isolate community in North Carolina of mixed ancestry, predominantly African and European. Many Lumbee people also assert Native American ancestry. Lumbee claims of Native American ancestry have faced scrutiny and skepticism for decades.

A group of Lumbee people known as the Lumbee Tribe of North Carolina were given federal recognition as a Native American tribe by Congress in 2026. President Donald Trump signed the Lumbee Fairness Act into law on December 18, 2025.

=== Ramapough Mountain people ===
The Ramampough Mountain people are a mixed-race group in New Jersey of mostly African and European ancestry. Historically they were often referred to as "Jackson whites", which Ramapough Mountain people may regard as a misnomer. Many also assert Native American ancestry, including Lenape and/or Tuscarora ancestry. Some of the Ramapough Mountain people are members of the Ramapough Mountain Indians, a state-recognized tribe in New Jersey. The Ramapough Mountain Indians do not have federal recognition as a tribe, nor are they recognized as a tribe in New York.

According to a 1976 report in The New York Times, "Some recoil from a black heritage and prefer to associate themselves with Indian ancestry" while "Others have passed for white outside their communities..."

== See also ==
- African American genealogy
- Black Indians in the United States
- Indigenous identity fraud in Canada and the United States
- Native American genealogy
- Native American identity in the United States
- Pretendian
- Racism against African Americans
