= Lydia Clark =

Last speaker of the Nanticoke language according to the Nanticoke Indian Association

Lydia E. Clark
- Born: circa late 18th-century Delaware
- Died: 1856
- Spouse: Whittington Clark

Lydia E. Clark was a woman from Delaware who the Nanticoke Indian Association, a state-recognized tribe in Delaware, considered to have been the last surviving speaker of the Nanticoke language. Clark testified at an 1855 trial that the Delaware Moors were of African descent.

== Early life ==
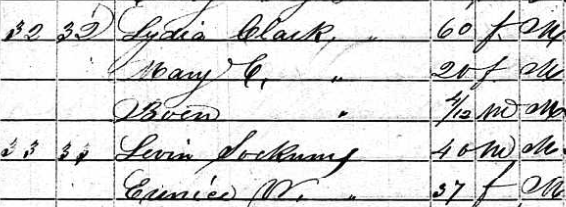
Lydia Clark and Levi Sockum both listed as "Mulatto" on the 1850 Federal Census.

Lydia Clark was born Lydia Norwood in Delaware in the late 18th-century. According to the Nanticoke Indian Association, Clark was the last living fluent speaker of the Nanticoke language and the language became extinct when she died. Clark is listed as a free colored female person on the 1840 United States census. In the 1850 United States census, Clark is listed as a "Mulatto".

== 1855 court trial ==
In 1855 in Millsboro, Delaware, a successful businessman named Levin Sockum sold guns at his store. Sockum identified as Nanticoke, but was viewed by some others as a Black man. Delaware law prohibited Black people from owning or selling guns. Sockum experienced legal trouble after selling gunpowder to another man, his cousin Isaiah Harmon, who also identified as Nanticoke but was viewed as a Black man by white society. Sockum and Harmon were accused of violating the law against Black people owning weapons and ammunition. The prosecution brought Clark to testify and she stated that she was the last surviving Nanticoke person and that both Sockum and Harmon were not of Native heritage, but were rather the descendants of enslaved people and a white plantation owner. Following Clark's testimony, the all-white jury ruled that Sockum and Harmon were "Negro" or "Mulatto" and not Nanticoke. Clark died the year following the trial.

In a 1935 article published by The News Journal of Wilmington, Delaware, a story about the Delaware Moors being descended from Spaniards or Spanish Moors was described as a legend. According to the report, titled "How an Irish Lady Married a Congo Chief Beginning the Legend of Delaware's Moors", Clark had testified that the Delaware Moors originated in the late 1700s prior to the American Revolution with an Irish woman named Regua who married an enslaved chief from the Congo who had been brought to the Port of Lewes. The article states that the children of the Irish woman and the Congolese man lived separately from both white and Black people.

Three state-recognized tribes exist near the Delaware Bay: the Nanticoke Indian Association and the Lenape Indian Tribe of Delaware, recognized by the state of New Jersey, and the Nanticoke Lenni-Lenape Tribal Nation, recognized by New Jersey. All three state-recognized tribes descend from a mixed-race community that was historically known as the Delaware Moors. The Delaware Moors originated in Delaware and an offshoot moved to New Jersey in the wake of the 1855 trial.

== Legacy ==
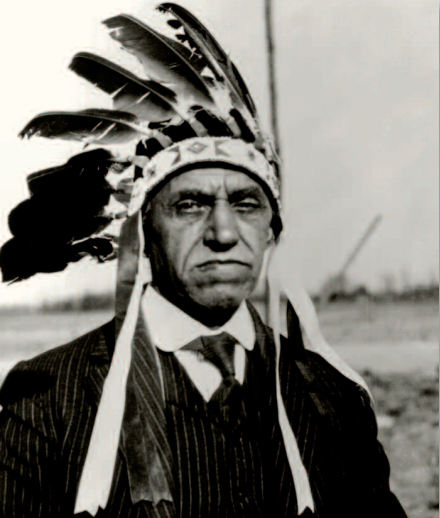
Lydia Clark's grandson William Russell Clark, also known as "Chief Wyniaco", the Nanticoke Indian Association's leader between 1880 and his death in 1928.

The Nanticoke Indian Association has disputed the accuracy of Clark's testimony, insisting that she committed perjury under duress. According to the historian Gabrielle Tayac, the Nanticoke Indian Association stresses that the 87 year old Clark was elderly, infirm, and depending upon a white family she lived with. The Nanticoke Indian Association maintains an oral tradition that Clark's testimony was coerced. The Nanticoke Indian Association refers to Clark as "Princess Nau-Gau-Okwa".

There are no existing photographs of Clark.

According to a 1935 article in The News Journal of Wilmington titled "Grave of Princess Stirs Interest in Pow Wow", the grave of Clark had been located in Indian River Hundred. The grave was thought to have been lost.

== See also ==
- Delaware Moors
