= Cajan =

Cajan may refer to:

- Cajuns, an ethnic group in Louisiana
- Cajans, an anglophone ethnic group in Alabama
- Cajan, a genus of legumes
