= Chestnut Ridge people =

Mixed-race community in West Virginia, US

Total population
- About 1,500

Regions with significant populations
- West Virginia, eastern United States

Languages
- English

Religion
- Protestant

Related ethnic groups
- Melungeons, Native Americans, Louisiana Redbones

The Chestnut Ridge people (CRP) are a mixed-race community concentrated in an area northeast of Philippi, Barbour County, in north-central West Virginia, with smaller related communities in the adjacent counties of Harrison and Taylor. They are often referred to as "Mayles" (from the most common surname — Mayle or Male), or "Guineas" (now considered a pejorative term).

The group has been the subject of county histories and some scholarly studies. Some scholars have classified this group as a racial isolate. Contemporary census records frequently designate community members as "mulattos", implying African heritage. Thomas McElwain wrote that many CRP identified as an Indian-white mixed group, or as Native American, but they are not enrolled in any officially recognized tribe. Paul Heinegg documented that many individuals were classified as free people of color, or similar terms in a variety of colonial, local and state records.

Some CRP have identified as Melungeon, a mixed-race group based in Kentucky and Tennessee, and attended the Melungeon unions, or joined the Melungeon Heritage Association. In 1997 two local historians made a presentation about the "Guineas of West Virginia" at the University of Virginia's College at Wise.

== History ==
Barbour County was settled primarily by white people from eastern Virginia, beginning in the 1770s and '80s. It was part of the colony (later state) of Virginia until West Virginia was admitted to the Union as a separate state during the American Civil War. The families that later became known as "Chestnut Ridge people" began to arrive after 1810, when Barbour was still part of Randolph and Harrison Counties, according to census records.

By the 1860s, many individuals from these multiracial families had married into the white community, and many of their descendants identified as white. Some of the men served in West Virginia Union army regiments during the American Civil War. Records in the Barbour County Courthouse indicate that a dozen men successfully petitioned the courts to be declared legally white after serving in the war for the Union. In the 1890s, the local West Virginia historian Hu Maxwell was bemused by these families and how to categorize them, writing:

There is a clan of partly-colored people in Barbour County often called "Guineas", under the erroneous presumption that they are Guinea negroes. They vary in color from white to black, often have blue eyes and straight hair, and they are generally industrious. Their number in Barbour is estimated at one thousand. They have been a puzzle to the investigator; for their origin is not generally known. They are among the earliest settlers of Barbour. Prof. W.W. Male of Grafton, West Virginia, belongs to this clan, and after a thorough investigation, says "They originated from an Englishman named Male who came to America at the outbreak of the Revolution. From that one man have sprung about 700 of the same name, not to speak of the half-breeds." Thus it would seem that the family was only half-black at the beginning, and by the inter-mixtures since, many are now almost white.

The people of "The Ridge" have traditionally been subject to severe racial discrimination, amounting to ostracism, by the surrounding majority-white community. Since the late 19th century, their neighbours have described them variously as free black or colored people, mulattoes, descendants of Italian railroad workers, or even survivors of the ill-fated Roanoke Colony. These same neighbors often called them "Guineas", a generalized slur against African Americans at the time.

In the 1930s, a local historian recorded that "on several occasions suits have been entered in Taylor and Barbour courts seeking to prevent these people from sending their children to schools with whites but proof of claims they have negro blood in their veins never has been established". As recently as the late 1950s, a few Philippi businesses still posted notices proclaiming "White Trade Only", directed against the Chestnut Ridge people, as they were believed to be part African-American. Although the local public schools were not segregated, truancy laws — which were strictly enforced for white children — were typically neglected with regard to "Ridge people". In her 2010 research, Alexandra Finley suggests the Chestnut Ridge families were initially open about their black heritage, but may have begun to identify increasingly as white to avoid racism – particularly anti-black racism – in the late 19th and 20th centuries, and would only acknowledge their black heritage under pressure.

== Demographics ==
If related individuals in the surrounding counties of Harrison and Taylor are included, the CRP probably now number about 1,500, almost all of whom bear one of fewer than a dozen surnames. The Taylor County group (also long referred to by their neighbors as "Guineas" and mostly dispersed in the 1930s due to the flooding of their community — known as the "West Hill settlement" — by Tygart Lake) bore the surnames of Mayle, Male, Mahalie, Croston, Dalton, Kennedy, Johnson and Parsons, among others. A 1977 survey of obituaries in The Barbour Democrat showed that 135 of 163 "Ridge people" (83%) living in Barbour County were married to people having the last names Mayle, Norris, Croston, Prichard, Collins, Adams, or Kennedy and Johnson. In 1984, of the 67 Mayles who had listed telephones, all but three lived on "The Ridge."

== Ancestry ==
B.V. Mayhle self-published a family history entitled The Males of Barbour County, West Virginia in 1980, with two updates. He documented the origins of the Male, Mahle, Mayle, Mayhle name in the United States. He claimed to have found only one incident of interracial union. In an interview, he said that the Pittsburgh, Pennsylvania press had carried repeated sensational magazine articles in the early 1900s about the area, highlighting its poverty and mixed-race communities. He suggests this was the origin of accounts that the group was mixed-race. Mayhle said that three brothers, direct descendants of Wilmore/William Male Sr. (the original Male immigrant), served in regular white units in the US Civil war. Two served in the 7th West Virginia Volunteer Infantry Regiment and one in the 1st West Virginia Volunteer Cavalry Regiment, which were all-white units.

Genealogist Paul Heinegg has used a variety of colonial-era court and tax documents to trace the ancestors of families identified in the South as free blacks in the first two censuses of the United States (1790, 1800). For instance, if a white woman had an illegitimate mixed-race child, the child had to serve a period of apprenticeship as an indentured servant to be trained in a trade and to prevent the community from having to support the woman and her child, meaning they should be included in recorded indentures. Heinegg found that most of the families of free people of color were descended from unions between white women, free or indentured servants, and African or African-American men, slaves or indentured servants, in colonial Virginia. According to the law of the colony and the principle of partus sequitur ventrem, by which children in the colony took the status of their mothers, the mixed-race children of these unions and marriages were born free because the mothers were free. While they were subject to discrimination, gaining free status helped these families get ahead in society.

Heinegg suggested that many of these free people of color migrated west with white neighbors and settled on the frontiers of Virginia, what became West Virginia, Kentucky, and Tennessee, as these areas were less bound by racial caste than were the Tidewater plantation areas. On the frontier, settlers were more concerned about people fulfilling social obligations as citizens. When analyzing generations of families classified as free blacks on those first two censuses, Heinegg noted that, for the early Mayle/Male family, many records from the 1790s to the 1850s classified members as "free black", "free mulatto", "free colored", etc. Work by Alexandra Finley supports Heinegg's conclusion that the Male family largely descends in the direct paternal line from an immigrant Englishman, Wilmore Male (1755–c. 1845), born in Dover, Kent, England.

In the 1760s, Wilmore Male Sr. settled in Virginia with his parents William and Mary. As an adult, around 1784, Wilmore Sr. purchased a Bahamian slave named Priscilla "Nancy" Harris, who was recorded as also having unconfirmed Indigenous Caribbean heritage, and took her as his common-law wife – interracial marriage being illegal in Virginia at the time. Except for one tax roll in 1797, where he was labelled a free black, Wilmore, Sr.'s race was either not listed or was declared as white until 1805 – although, from 1783 to 1800, all free persons were considered "white-titheable" for tax purposes. Finley concludes that despite this, discrepancies in his racial classification during this period were due to the perceptions of those recording such details – the only time he was described as black before 1805 was when an Arjalon Price recorded the information; the rest of the time, Wilmore, Sr.'s race was recorded by George Beall, who had known his father, and therefore listed him as white. From 1805 onwards, records reflected Wilmore, Sr.'s family circumstances and the views of his neighbors: he was listed as a "free mulatto", which legally described someone with a quarter or more black heritage. He was subsequently listed as a free black (1806), free mulatto (1809–1811), "man of color" (1813, Monongalia County), free black (1815, Monongalia County) and "colored" (1817, Randolph County). Wilmore Sr. had five sons with Nancy, who were all recorded as free blacks, free mulattoes or free colored people: Wilmore Male Jr.; William Male; James Male; George Male; and Richard Male. His marriage to Nancy, and their mixed-race children, meant he was grouped with them.

In 1826, when he was 71, Male emancipated Nancy on the condition she remained as his wife for the rest of his life, writing:

Be it known to all to whom it may concern that I, Wilmore Mail, of the County of Hampshire and Commonwealth of Virginia do by these presents liberate, emancipate, and forever set free ... my negro woman Nancy on the condition that she may remain with me during my natural life in the quality of my wife. I have set my hand and affixed my seal on this 6th day of May in the year of our Lord 1826.

— Wilmore Male

The 1840 United States census, in the special list for veterans of the Revolutionary War, again classified Wilmore Sr. as "free colored". He died that same year.

Historians and genealogists have also written of Nancy's heritage. Traditional accounts, such as the work by Thomas McElwain, had previously asserted that Nancy was white and Native American, citing family stories, a lack of records, and Male's circumstances as a bricklayer (meaning he may have been unable to afford to keep slaves). This was sometimes in contrast with Mayhle's own work, which recognized her African heritage and stated that it was unknown if she had Indigenous heritage or not. Scholarship since the 1990s, while ambivalent on the topic of Indigenous ancestry, suggests the evidence for her black heritage is much clearer. According to Mayhle and Hoye, Priscilla "Nancy" Harris was the daughter of a Bahamian or Haitian slave and a man called Harris, who may have been Indigenous. They state that Nancy's mother was brought to the United States in the middle of the 18th century by Marquis Calmes, a Frenchman from the Bahamas, who had a plantation in Virginia. Nancy grew up on the Calmes plantation before Wilmore Male Sr. purchased her. According to Finley, it is probable that Male purchased Nancy with the intent of making her his wife. This is supported by both Mayhle and Hoye, who report that she was said to be particularly attractive, and that some of her long hair was kept as a memento by the family.

Finley's work also identified a number of other Chestnut Ridge families that can trace their heritage back to Revolutionary War-era mixed-race forebears, such as Sam Norris (1750–1844), Gustavus D. Croston (1757–c. 1845) and Henry Dalton (1750–1836), as well as others arriving in the mid-19th century, such as Jacob Minerd (1816–1907). The descendants of each of these progenitors formed their own local lineage complete with unique folklore and origin story.

In 2014, Harvard historian Henry Louis Gates, Jr discovered, through DNA genealogy testing, that Wilmore Mail is among his ancestors. Although no documentary connection was made, Mail is the only one of Gates' white ancestors for whom a name is known. This discovery was featured on the final second-season episode of Professor Gates' television series Finding Your Roots with Henry Louis Gates, Jr.. He visited Philippi and attended a "Heritage Day" gathering on Chestnut Ridge.

== See also ==
- Bessie Mayle
- Brandywine people
  - Piscataway Indian Nation and Tayac Territory
  - Piscataway-Conoy Tribe of Maryland
- Brass Ankles
  - Wassamasaw Tribe of Varnertown Indians
- Delaware Moors
  - Lenape Indian Tribe of Delaware
  - Nanticoke Indian Association
  - Nanticoke Lenni-Lenape Tribal Nation
- Dominickers
- Local history
- Lumbee
  - Lumbee Tribe of North Carolina
- Melungeons
  - Carmelites
- Alabama Cajans
  - MOWA Band of Choctaw Indians
- Microhistory
- One-place study
- Ramapough Mountain People
- Redbones
- Scott Mayle
