= Scott Mayle =

American football player (born 1983)

No. 19
- Position: Wide receiver

Personal information
- Born: October 14, 1983 (age 43); Philippi, West Virginia, U.S.
- Listed height: 6 ft 1 in (1.85 m)
- Listed weight: 175 lb (79 kg)

Career information
- College: Ohio
- NFL draft: 2007: undrafted

Career history
- Buffalo Bills (2007–2008); Kansas City Chiefs (2008)*
- * Offseason or practice squad member only

Awards and highlights
- Collegefootballnews.com All-MAC (2005)

Scott Mayle (born October 14, 1983) is an American former football wide receiver. He was signed by the Buffalo Bills as an undrafted free agent in 2007. He played college football at Ohio.

Mayle was also a member of the Kansas City Chiefs.

== Early life ==
A four-sport athlete at Philip Barbour High School, Mayle earned three letters in football and track, two in basketball and one in baseball. He was the Big Ten Conference Co-Player of the Year in 2000 and 2001 and earned all-state and all-state honorable mention during his career. During his senior year, he helped the Colts to a third-place finish in the conference and a No. 13 ranking in the state.

== College career ==
As a player for the Ohio Bobcats of Ohio University, Mayle ranked fourth in school history for most receptions in a career with 107, second in most receiving yards in a career with 1,847, and third in touchdown receptions for a career with 11. As a senior, he caught 28 passes for a team-high 411 yards, and his 14.7 yards per catch was the highest on the team. He had four rushes for 57 yards and a touchdown, and led the Bobcats with 14 kickoff returns for 287 5 yards. In his senior season, he helped lead the Bobcats to a MAC East Division title, a MAC Championship Game appearance, and a 2007 GMAC Bowl appearance.

Mayle also earned acclaim at Ohio as a world-class track and field athlete in the long jump. In both the 2006 and 2007 indoor and outdoor seasons, he earned a spot at the NCAA championships. During his senior year, he was ranked fourth in the world during the indoor season.

== Professional career ==
=== Buffalo Bills ===
Scott Mayle was originally signed by the Buffalo Bills as an undrafted free agent in 2007. Mayle was cut by the Buffalo Bills on August 31, 2008.

=== Kansas City Chiefs ===
Mayle was signed to the practice squad of the Kansas City Chiefs on September 3, 2008. He was released a few weeks later.

== See also ==
- Chestnut Ridge people
