= Delaware Moors =

American ethnic group

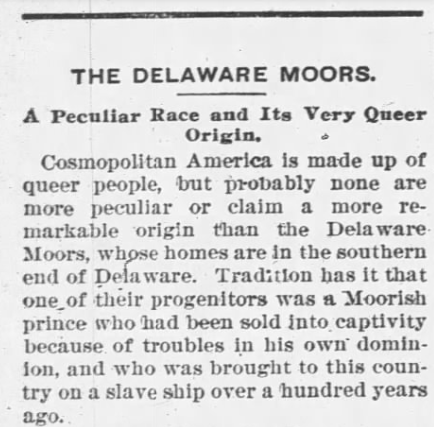
Article about the Delaware Moors in The Pick and Gad of Shullsburg, Wisconsin, December 26, 1895.

The Delaware Moors were a mixed-race group in Delaware and southern New Jersey who descended from free people of color. In Delaware, they were legally classified as African Americans until 1914, when some were reclassified as a separate, non-Black group. Others assimilated into the African-American upper class.

Their descendants predominantly live in southern Kent County and Sussex County in Delaware. Three state-recognized tribes descend from the Delaware Moors, including the Lenape Indian Tribe of Delaware and the Nanticoke Indian Association in Delaware, as well as an offshoot group in Cumberland County, New Jersey, known as the Nanticoke Lenni-Lenape Tribal Nation. None are federally recognized.

== History ==
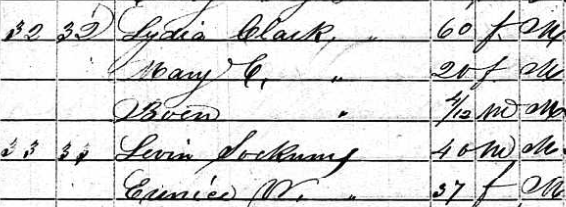
Lydia Clark and Levin Sockum both listed as "Mulatto" on the 1850 Federal Census.

The Delaware Moors descended from free people of color in Delaware and identify as descendants of African-American, European American, Lenape, and Nanticoke people. Delaware Moor families traced their ancestries back to the 18th century in the Central Delaware counties of Kent and Sussex. Stories exist that their European ancestry was derived from Spanish pirates evading colonial authorities. According to one version of the legend, a group of Spanish Moors were shipwrecked along the Delaware Coast and moved inland where they mixed with Native Americans. The belief in descent from Spaniards is the likely origin of the term "Moors". Delaware Moors were listed as "Black" or "Mulatto" on census records during the 1800s and early 1900s. In 1914, the State of Delaware agreed to recognize "Delaware Moors" as a separate, non-Black race, which effected the voting process and election rights for Delaware Moors. According to the ethnographer James Mooney, the Delaware Moors were "of similar origin" to other mixed-race ethnic groups like the Croatans (Lumbee) of North Carolina, Redbones of Louisiana, and Melungeons of Appalachia.

According to an 1895 report from The New York Times titled "So-Called Moors Farmers of Delaware", the Delaware Moors were farmers of "mixed Indian and African blood" who did not socially mix with the white or Black populations of the region. The Delaware Moors maintained their own schools for Moors that were distinct from the general public education system. Another 1895 article about the Delaware Moors published in The Pick and Gad of Shullsburg, Wisconsin, stated that the Delaware Moors operated their own Methodist church and did not practice Islam.

In a 1935 article published by The News Journal of Wilmington, Delaware, the story about the Delaware Moors being descended from Spaniards was described as a legend. According to the report, a woman named Lydia Clark had testified in an 1855 court case that during the late 1700s the Delaware Moors originated with an Irish woman who had purchased and married an enslaved chief from the Congo who had been brought to the Port of Lewes. The 1855 court case was regarding a successful Millsboro, Delaware businessman named Levin Sockum who sold guns at his store. Sockum identified as Nanticoke, but was viewed by some others as a Black man. Delaware law prohibited Black people from owning or selling guns. Sockum experienced legal trouble after selling gunpowder to another man, his cousin Isaiah Harmon, who also identified as Nanticoke but was viewed as a Black man by white society. Sockum and Harmon were accused of violating the law against Black people owning weapons and ammunition. The prosecution brought Clark to testify and she stated that she was the last surviving Nanticoke person and that both Sockum and Harmon were not of Native heritage, but were rather the descendants of enslaved people and a white plantation owner. Following Clark's testimony, the all-white jury ruled that Sockum and Harmon were "Negro" or "Mulatto" and not Nanticoke. Clark died the year following the trial. The Nanticoke Indian Association, who refer to Clark as "Princess Nau-Gau-Okwa", maintain an oral tradition that Clark was coerced into committing perjury under duress, stressing that she was elderly, infirm, and dependent upon the white family she lived with.

By 1867, Delaware Moor families were working as tenant farmers on Sockum's land, and were amassing personal property and land, corresponding to a period of increased birthrate.

=== Split of racial identity ===
In 1876, after requesting a pastor of their "color", one was assigned to the church the Delaware Moors attended. As a result, many in the congregation withdrew in protest, labeling him as an African-American. By 1888, the withdrawees held services in their own homes, then constructed the Indian Mission Church. The original church became the Harmony African Methodist Episcopal Church.

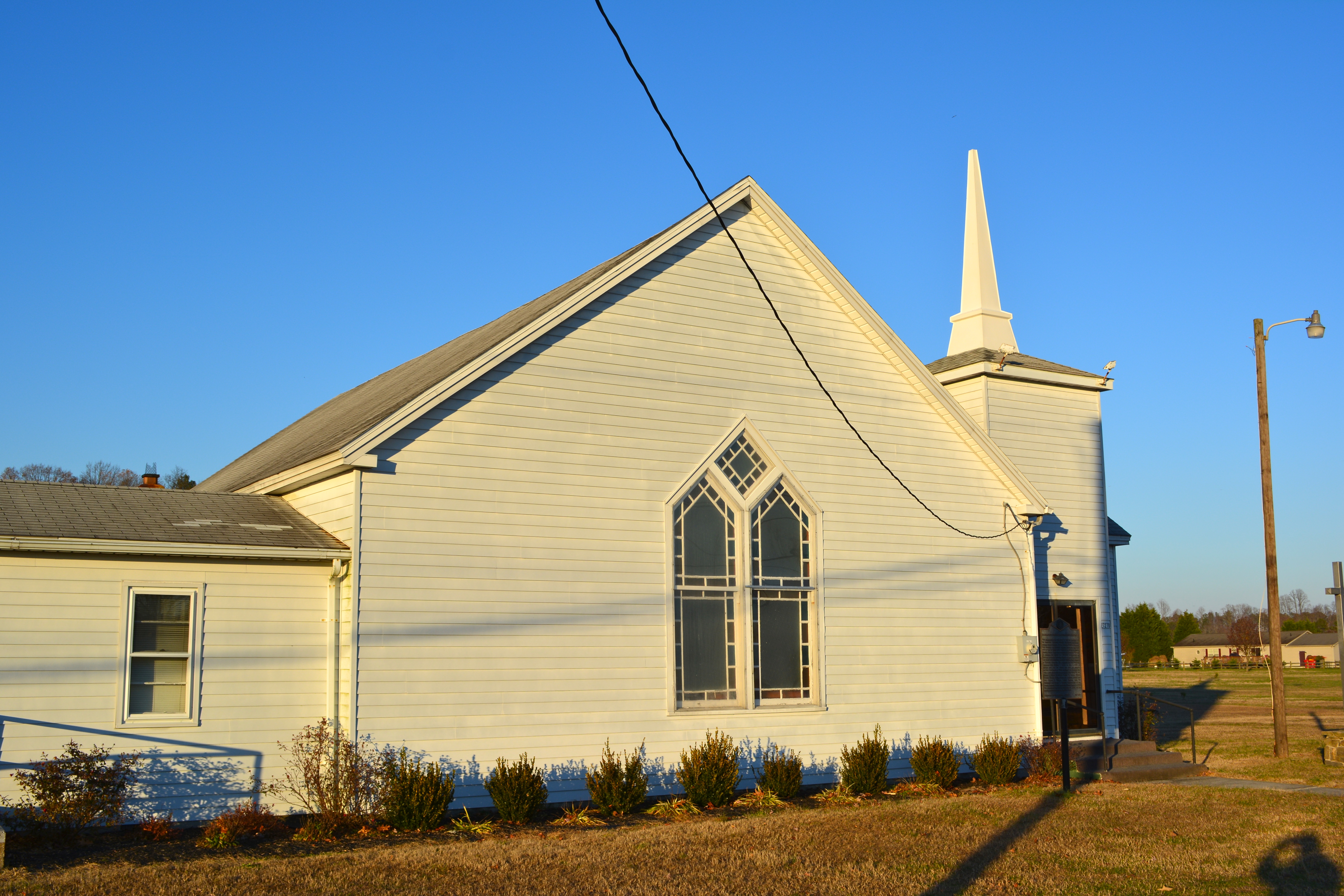
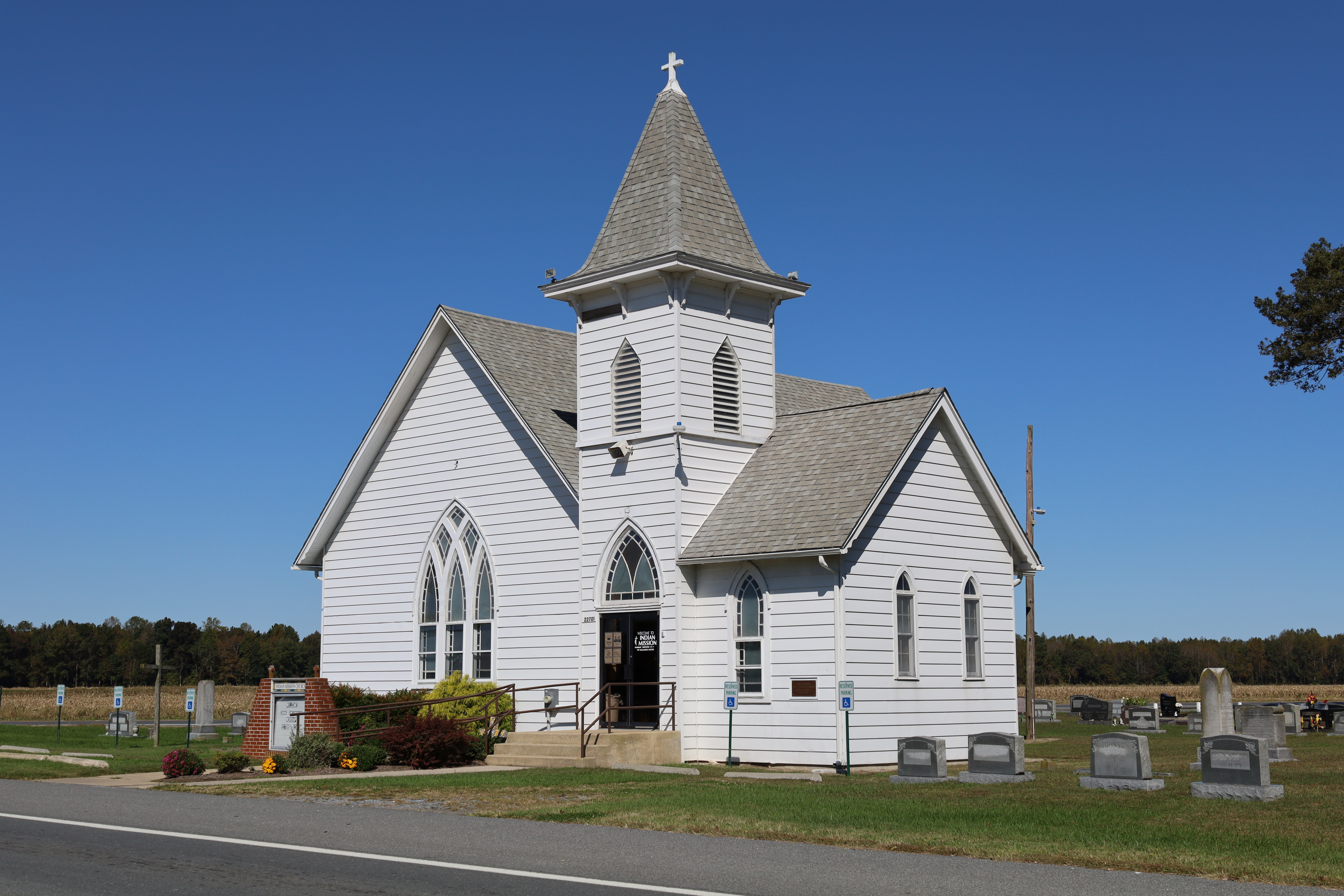
The Harmony African Methodist Episcopal, and Indian Mission Churches.

This resulted in the Delaware Moor community splitting into two groups. The first pursued a Native American identity, and refused association with African-Americans, with whom they had worshiped in common since the slavery era. They also ostracized those within their community who associated or intermarried with African-Americans. The second, referred to as the "Harmonies" or "Harmony group" remained at the Harmony Church, attending school and intermarrying with Black people.

The Harmonies integrated into the industrial wage-labor economy. They began attending African-American highschools and African-American colleges, obtaining better education than the other group, who remained in the rural economy. Their life expectancy rose to be higher than the other group, as well as above European-Americans. The Harmonies became light-skinned, upper class African-Americans, enjoying social and economic privileges relative to most African-Americans due to their closer kinship ties with whites. As a result of said ties, they possessed systemic advantages such as earlier manumission, former house servitude, and knowledge of skilled trades. They also typically had higher land inheritance and education levels, and sometimes passed as white during seasonal jobs.

Conversely, the other group opposed the attendance of their children at "colored schools", gradually lowering in life expectancy and rising in infant mortality. However, they maintained their self-identification as Native Americans, denying partial Black ancestry, and later founded the Nanticoke Indian Association.

Anthropologist Michael L. Blakey, of maternal Delaware Moor ancestry, proposed previous ethnographic reports on the Delaware Moors were biased, solely interviewing the non-Harmony branch, who denied familial relation to the group they had split from. He stated historical cultural anthropologists were uninterested in African-American studies, only being interested in the study of Native Americans, and that modern ones were repelled by the topic of racial isolates due to its association with eugenics and racism. He noted Frank Speck introduced western Native American crafts to the group, which he suggested was an attempt to make them fit his view of "real Indians".

=== State recognition ===
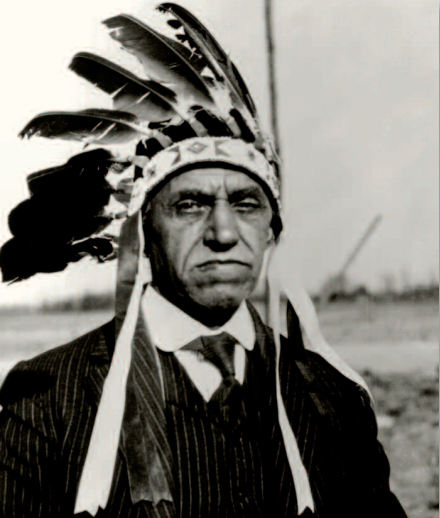
Lydia's grandson William Clark, known as "Chief Wyniaco", who served as the Nanticoke Indian Association's leader until his death in 1928.

The State of Delaware has acknowledged the Lenape Indian Tribe of Delaware as a state-recognized tribe. According to the Delaware Legislature, the Lenape Indian Tribe of Delaware descends from the historic Delaware Moors of Kent County. The Lenape Indian Tribe of Delaware, the state-recognized Nanticoke Indian Association in Delaware, and the state-recognized Nanticoke Lenni-Lenape Tribal Nation in New Jersey are related through ancestral and cultural ties. Ancestors of all three groups were historically known as Moors.

=== Postrecognition ===
Academic J. Lorand Matory writes that some younger members of the tribes in Delaware are said to find Blackness more modern, due to associating it with popular culture. He states their peers who identify as Indian feel "outvoted", and less popular. Some who moved to California adopt Chicano identity, while some members of the Nanticoke Lenni-Lenape in New Jersey had assimilated as Puerto Rican.

== Population ==
In 1993, the population of Delaware Moors was about 800 people, most of whom lived in southern Kent County.

Gouldtown, New Jersey is home to a population descended from the New Jersey branch of Delaware Moors. The off-shoot was known as Goulds or Gouldtowners. Part of the community, mostly inhabited by Pierces, was known as Piercetown, but eventually Gouldtowners began to be used to refer to the community as a whole.

Surnames commonly associated with the Delaware Moors include Coker, Norwood, Durham, and Jackson.

== See also ==
- African Americans in New Jersey
- Angola, Delaware
- Alabama Cajans
- Brandywine people
- Brass Ankles
  - Wassamasaw Tribe of Varnertown Indians
- Chestnut Ridge people
- Dominickers
- Lenape Indian Tribe of Delaware
- Lenape Nation of Pennsylvania
- Lumbee
- Melungeon
  - Carmel Melungeons
- Nanticoke Indian Association
- Nanticoke Lenni-Lenape Tribal Nation
- Powhatan Renape Nation
- Ramapough Mountain People
- Redbones
