= Nanticoke Indian Association =

State-recognized tribe and non-profit organization in Delaware, US

Nanticoke Indian Association Inc.
- Type: 501(c)(3) organization
- Tax ID no.: 51-0261316
- Headquarters: Millsboro, Delaware
- Location: United States
- Members: 500+
- Official language: English
- Website: www.nanticokeindians.org

The Nanticoke Indian Association is a state-recognized tribe and non-profit organization who have their headquarters in Millsboro, Delaware. They organized and were recognized by the state as a legal entity in 1881, known as the Independent Body. They were recognized as a Native American tribe by the state of Delaware in 1922, after having previously been legally classified as African Americans.

The Nanticoke Indian Association is one of two groups recognized as tribes in Delaware, the other being the Lenape Indian Tribe of Delaware. Neither has been recognized as a tribe by the federal government. Together with the state-recognized Nanticoke Lenni-Lenape Tribal Nation in New Jersey, these three state-recognized tribes descend from a group historically known as the Delaware Moors.

== About ==
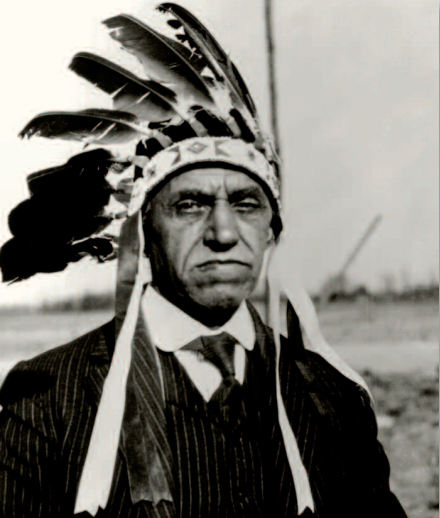
William Russell Clark, also known as "Chief Wyniaco", the association's leader between 1880 and his death in 1928.

In 1875, the state of Delaware passed "An Act To Tax Colored Persons For The Support Of Their Schools". At this time, Nanticoke Indian Association people were not allowed to form a school for members of their own community, and had to pay taxes for schools that their children did not attend. Because of this, members of the Nanticoke Indian Association began to form what would soon be called the Incorporated Body. "This was a non tribal group of thirty-one Indian descendants who had volunteered to fight for the common cause and to pool their funds to support separate schools for their children". On March 10, 1881, the Incorporated Body was recognized as a legal entity by the state of Delaware. Surnames among their 31 members were Harmon, Wright, Norwood, Clark, Street, Johnson, Kimmey and Drain. These are still common in Sussex County today, and anyone wanting to be a member of the Nanticoke Indian Association must prove descent from one or more of them.

Through this action, Nanticoke Indian Association members were legally recognized as a non-Black, third racial group in the state of Delaware. Historically, some members of the Nanticoke Indian Association and the Lenape Indian Tribe of Delaware were known as the Delaware Moors and had community ties with the Moors of Bridgeton, New Jersey, descendants of whom are now part of the state-recognized Nanticoke Lenni-Lenape Tribal Nation. The Nanticoke Indian Association was allowed to erect two schools for children, aged seven through twenty one. The Corporation first built the Harmon School.

Before a local public school was completed, African-American teachers and students were also assigned to the Harmon School. Nanticoke Indian Association parents pulled their children out and opened a mission school, wanting to pass on their own culture. In 1922 the tribal descendants organized the Nanticoke Indian Association and gained state recognition as a separate people. In the late 1970s, they took over the Harmon School and adapted it for use as the Nanticoke Indian Museum.

Association government:

The group elects a chief as leader. In 2002 Kenneth S. "Red Deer" Clark Sr. (1930-2015), the head chief of the association, resigned in protest because of actions by other members. He felt they were shortsighted and not beneficial to all members. One of the main issues was over how large the annual pow-wow should be and how much association members should participate in preparations for the pow-wow.

== Notable people ==
- Lydia Clark
- James Young Deer, actor

== See also ==
- Brandywine people
  - Piscataway Indian Nation and Tayac Territory
  - Piscataway-Conoy Tribe of Maryland
- Brass Ankles
  - Wassamasaw Tribe of Varnertown Indians
- Chestnut Ridge people
- Delaware Moors
  - Lenape Indian Tribe of Delaware
  - Nanticoke Lenni-Lenape Tribal Nation
- Dominickers
- Lenape Nation of Pennsylvania
- Lumbee
  - Lumbee Tribe of North Carolina
- Melungeon
  - Carmel Melungeons
- Powhatan Renape Nation
- Ramapough Mountain Indians
- Redbones
