= Islam in Delaware =

Muslim community in the United States

Islam is an established religion in Delaware. According to the US Religion Census, as of 2020 there were about 7,000 Muslims in Delaware, making 0.71% of the population; with about 6,120 in New Castle County, 950 in Kent County, and data not being reported for Sussex County.

The religious director of the Islamic Society of Delaware claims it is the "heart and soul of the Muslim community in Delaware." The society was founded by a few dozen people in 1977, and eventually grew even beyond Delaware. In 1986 ISD had grown to over 800 families.

As of 2016 the state's largest mosque is Masjid Ibrahim, run by the Islamic Society of Delaware and opened in 1991. Newark County has two Islamic schools as of 2016. The Islamic Academy of Delaware (K-8) was opened in 2008 and has ~130 students. Tarbiyah grew out of two Muslim families who began to homeschool their children in 2010, opened in September 2011, and now has ~180 students.

The Muslim community in Delaware is diverse. While Masjid Ibrahim is multicultural, and Masjid Isa Ib-e-Miryam (located in Tarbiyah) is similar, there are two Turkish mosques, one emerging Bangladeshi mosque, and two African-American mosques in Wilmington.

Two other related organisations are the Delaware Council on Global and Muslim Affairs, founded in 2015, a local advocacy group; and the American Turkish Friendship Association, founded in 2009, which tries to promote respect and inclusion by hosting cross-cultural activities.

The state elected its first Muslim lawmaker, Madinah Wilson-Anton, in the 2020 election cycle. She ran and won against her former boss when she was a staffer, John Viola, beating him in the primary by only 43 votes.

== History ==
=== Legends of the Delaware Moors ===
It has been hypothesized that the history of Islam in Delaware extends as far back as the origin of the Delaware Moors, a mixed-race community in Kent and Sussex counties whose origins have been variously attributed to 18th century shipwrecked Spanish Moorish pirates, wives brought over from the 17th century British evacuation of Tangier, or a legendary romance between a European colonist and an enslaved Moorish prince. Similar to some other multiracial communities like the Free Moors of the Carolinas, the Delaware Moors historically claimed Muslim origins dating back to Colonial times. However, an 1895 article about the Delaware Moors published in The Pick and Gad of Shullsburg, Wisconsin, stated that the Delaware Moors operated their own Methodist church and did not practice Islam.

== Mosques, schools, community centers and organizations ==
- The Islamic Society of Delaware in Newark has the largest Muslim community following in the state. Communal prayers are held, providing an opportunity to learn about Islam, pray in congregation and meet Muslims.
- The First State Islamic Foundation is an umbrella organization of five distinct projects: Masjid Isa Ibn-e-Maryam, Tarbiyah School, Weekend Islamic School, After School Quran Program and a full-time Hifz school.

=== Mosques ===
- Masjid al Kauthar, is a mosque located in Wilmington and is the oldest mosque in Delaware.
- Masjid Ibrahim (Islamic Society of Delaware, www.isdonline.org) in Newark is the largest mosque in Delaware.
- Masjid Isa Ibn-e-Maryam (First State Islamic Foundation) is located in Newark and is co-located with Tarbiyah School under the umbrella of First State Islamic Foundation.
- The Elkton Masjid
- The Glasgow Mosque
- Masjid Ar Razzaqq
- Delaware Turkish Mosque
- Muhammad Mosque 35
- Masjid Baitul Aman
- Masjid al-Ikhlaas. Also has an Islamic bookstore connected to it.

=== Organizations ===
- Masjid Al-Kauthar (aka Muslim Center of Wilmington) is the first established Muslim organization in Delaware established in 1957.
- University of Delaware Muslim Students Association is a resident-student organization at the University of Delaware.

=== Community centers ===
- ICNA Relief Center of DE is an international relief organization. Its DE office provides relief services to the local homeless and needy. They also offer free tutoring classes and adult classes.
- Zakat Community Center of Delaware is a social service center for the Delaware area. Parent organization: Zakat Foundation of America: Offers free tutoring, ESL classes and distributes food once a month in Wilmington.
