= Alabama Cajans =

Historical mixed-race ethnic group from southern Alabama

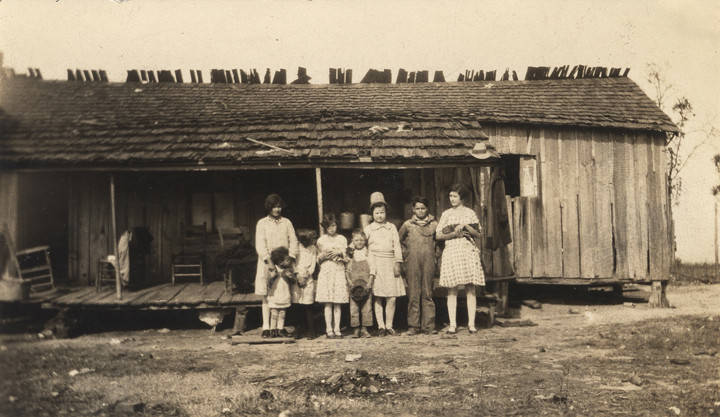
- Cajans standing in front of one of their homes, near Calvert, Alabama
- 1974 (est.): 2000–4500

Regions with significant populations
- Alabama (Mobile, Washington, and Clarke counties) Mississippi

Languages
- English

Religion
- Baptist, Methodism, Conjure

Related ethnic groups
- Dominickers, Redbones, Melungeons, Lumbee, Brandywine people, Carmelites, Chestnut Ridge people, Free Black people

The Alabama Cajans, sometimes spelled Cajuns, were a historic group of communities, described as having varying degrees of ancestry from free Black people, whites, Alabama Creoles, Redbones, and possible Native Americans. They historically resided in the counties of Mobile, Washington, and Clarke within Alabama. They socially assorted apart from Black Alabamians but were classified as non-white and excluded from white schools.

The name Cajan was an exonym created by a local politician to distinguish them from other ethnic groups, such as the freedmen emancipated after the Civil War and the Alabama Creoles. They were unrelated to the Louisiana Cajuns. Members of these communities often considered the name pejorative, and sometimes referred to themselves as "a peculiar people" instead.

Their descendants variously integrated into white communities, began identifying as Black, retired the term Cajan and expressed MOWA Choctaw identity, or reclaimed the Cajan identity for themselves. Some now reside in Mississippi.

== History ==
Groups considered Cajan are described as having varying amounts of Black, white, and possible Native American ancestries. They are typically descended from free Black and Alabama Creole communities who intermarried with whites. They are also described to intermarry with Redbones. They were culturally different from the nearby Alabama Creoles and Louisiana Cajuns.

Cajans inhabited a hilly region straddling the counties of Mobile, Washington, and Clarke, labelled by locals as Cajan Country. They often lived in backcountry areas such as woodlands or swamps, forming small isolated communities. They worked in the lumber and turpentine industries.

=== Initial settlements (1818 – 1840s) ===
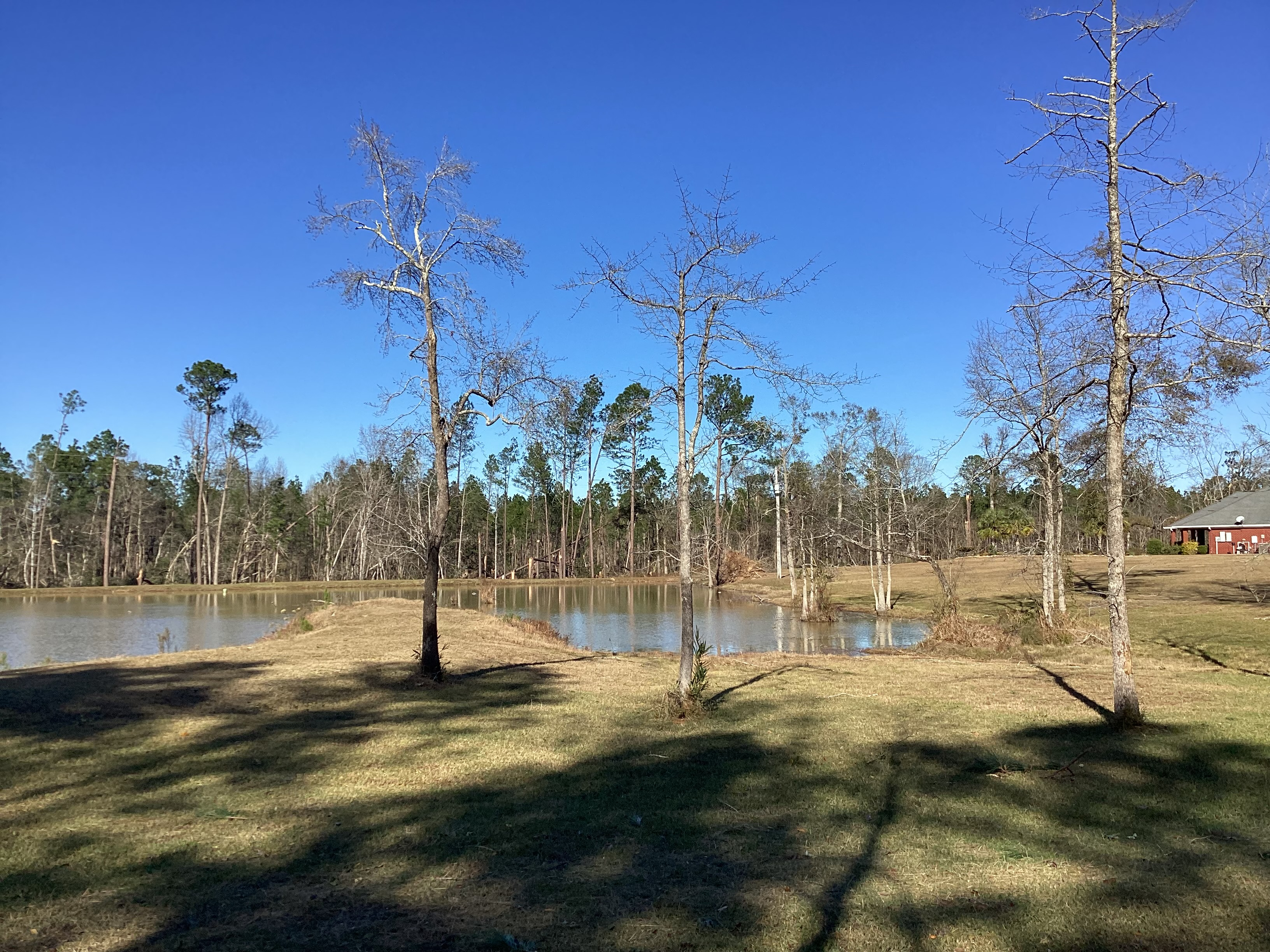
Land near Tibbie, Alabama.

The Reeds, Weavers, and Byrds were described as historic Cajan families. Scholars Eugene Griessman and Curtis Henson suggested the Cajan surname Chestang alluded to Creole ancestry. Surnames classified as Cajan indicated Scots-Irish ancestry, rather than French-Canadian.

The Cajans are written to begin with the marriage of Daniel and Rose Reed, who initially settled near Tibbie in Washington County. (Note: Daniel was locally described as a mixed-race man from Jamaica or Hispaniola, and Rose was described to originate from Mississippi.) Daniel emancipated Rose from slavery in 1818, and later emancipated three of their children. They eventually had eight in total. (Note: Daniel and his wife later had 56 grandchildren, and 202 great-grandchildren in total. Scholars Eugene Griessman and Curtis Henson wrote the sons of Daniel and Rose Reed married mulatto women.) The Reeds were the only free family of color residing permanently in Washington County during the Antebellum era.

Lemuel Byrd migrated from North Carolina to fight in the Indian Wars under Andrew Jackson. Griessman and Henson suggested his wife Anna was related to two Weavers claiming to be from Georgia, who were in Mobile County ten years before Byrd arrived there.

=== Land acquisitions (1830s–1890s) ===
Though the Cajans were of poor economic status, they owned land in significant quantities. In 1836, the Reed family received 39.95 acres of land within the county. By 1849, they owned 117 acres via later purchases.

Cajan families obtained more land via expansions of the Homestead Acts from the 1860s to mid-1870s, which widened the settlement area of the Cajans to its 20th century boundaries. Later generations of the Reed family obtained more land to the south and east via homestead grants, totaling 1700 acres by the 1880s-1890s. The land was initially used for cattle grazing, then as a source of lumber. Lumber from the area was used for logs, naval stores, and pulpwood later in the century.

=== Institution of segregation (1925 – 1931) ===
In 1925, defending himself against miscegenation charges, a Daniel Reed argued he was "Cajun", meaning a mix of "[Acadian], Indian, and Spanish" descent – although he did not have any Acadian heritage and was unrelated to the Louisiana Cajuns. Scholar Christophe Landry writes this was counterproductive, as the term "Cajun" was commonly associated with local population isolates of partial Black ancestry. Daniel was indicted for marrying a white woman.

Cajan attempts to enroll their children in white schools were viewed by local whites as attempts to desegregate schooling in the area. Thus whites enacted legal measures, via multiple court hearings against Cajans attempting to enroll. This created the precedent for defining Cajans as colored, and they were automatically rejected from white schools afterwards. Some observers described the Cajans to be economically worse off than African-Americans at this time.

==== Segregated school system ====
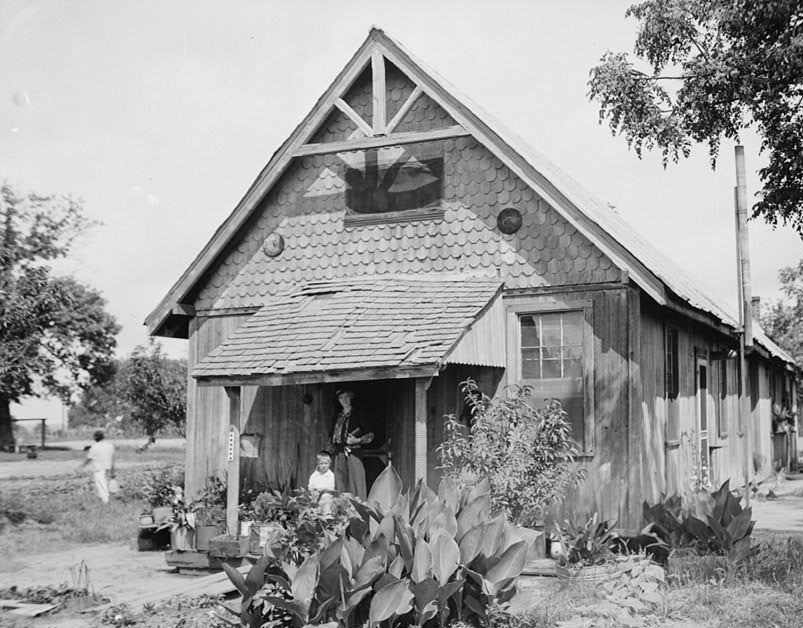
Cajan Weaver School in 1933.

Cajans had their own missionary-founded school system by the 1930s, due to standard white schools excluding a portion of them. (Note: Certain surnames were present at high rates in a study of students at the Calcedeaver School. Researcher William S. Pollitzer suggested this reflected genetic drift or founder effect within the population.) They had previously been often unchurched.

For a period before the institution of Cajan schools, many Cajans received little or no schooling due to refusing to attend Black schools. Some children attending white schools were expelled after school staff discovered their relation to people labelled Cajan. In areas not served by Cajan schools, some went to Black schools in the early 19th century if they could not pass as white. Later on, Cajans were recorded refusing to attend schools with Black teachers, although lighter-skinned Black women were accepted at least as late as 1931. One such case was recorded in 1920.

The schools were underfunded, and in some cases several grades would be taught in the same classroom. In 1931, African-American historian Horace Mann Bond conducted the first academic report on the group, titled "Two Racial Islands in Alabama", wherein he performed a comparative study between them and Alabama Creoles living in Magnolia Springs. Bond recorded their students had lower scores on the Stanford Achievement Test than African-Americans or Alabama Creoles.

=== Segregation period (1931 – 1969) ===
Areas of settlement historically denoted as Cajun in Alabama, 1950. This region was also referred to as Cajan Country. A few decades later in 1975, paved roads had been implemented throughout the settlement area.

Carl Carmer visited Cajans settled near Citronelle when researching for his 1934 novel, Stars Fell on Alabama.

A series of life histories by the Federal Writers' Project documented Isaac Johnson (Jake Gaw), a Cajan in Washington County, later described as a poor white by scholar Wayne Flynt. (Note: Flynt labels the American South as the most ethnically homogeneous region in the USA. Bill Malone criticizes this view, writing he had neglected Cajuns and several mixed-race groups.) Living along the Tombigbee River, he worked as a turpentiner in a secondary forest. His father had previously acquired 40 acres of farmland due to working in an old growth forest. The turpentine economy underwent depression during Isaac's career, and sawmills which used to employ him had closed. By the 1930s, his cabin lacked windowpanes, but his white wife was able to supplement his income by teaching in a Cajan school.

==== Social stratification ====
Communities described as Cajan were described by successive researchers in the 20th century as mixed-race people socially delineated from Black Alabamians, but lacking acceptance from local whites. William S. Pollitzer et al. observed that status was centered on one's apparent degree of Black ancestry.

Local Cajan communities did not necessarily identify with other groups designated as Cajan. They identified with separate "neighborhoods" of extended families that surrounded a specific school and would sometimes not associate with Cajans attending other schools. Marriage between Cajans from different neighborhoods would be spoken of in terms of marrying "up" or "down", depending on the relative status of the neighborhood in question.

==== Property and labor arrangements ====
Landholding rights in the community were kept intact by a specific system of land tenure. Landowners, rather than transferring titles, instead informed the tax assessor that they would take over payments for the land of their parents. Thus parcels were sometimes under the name of long deceased ancestors of a family. Cajans were 12% more likely to own their homes than other residents of Alabama, however the homes were of lower quality than those of whites on average.

Scholar G.H. Stopp documented a broker system in the community of Cedar Creek. (Note: Cedar Creek was a community denoted as Cajan, with an estimated population of 600. It historically lacked arable land.) Cajuns in this system could only cut trees if listed by brokers, who were local Cajan men. At the local railroad siding, brokers received cutting schedules from logging company representatives. (Note: Permission for cutting was also only available from the representatives stationed at the railroad sidings. Only a broker could obtain permission to cut trees on company-owned land.) These brokers gave representatives lists of available workers, who would only be allowed to sell lumber at the nearest siding. The brokers received commission on lumber sold by their recommended workers.

Cajan workers at Cedar Creek often intentionally lived near their patron broker, and at times the broker's fencing enclosed their own property. Brokers acted as local foremen in their precinct, and successfully guided their workers to vote according to local lumber company interests. Cajans had to buy all of their logging equipment on credit at noncompetitive prices. Stopp wrote they had low credit risk, as payments on the equipment were subtracted from their own pay.

==== Efforts by locals to maintain segregation ====
Historian Clement Eaton interviewed the state archivist of Alabama, who expressed her desire to research family lines near Mobile for Cajan ancestry, to properly identify them. Decades later, several individuals had compiled records on the genealogy of major Cajan families, with four possessing records specifically on the Reeds. Scholars Curtis Henson and Eugene Griessman propose this was due to Jim Crow era laws mandating the societal exclusion of people with African ancestry. They suggest the ability of light-skinned Cajans to pass the color line led people to document them more carefully, to prevent their integration.

At one point, lumber industry interests near Cedar Creek had hired a white-passing Cajan from Mt. Vernon to keep genealogical records of the community's families via his personal contacts. He used these records to reveal Cajan children who attempted to enroll in white schools outside the community. Thereafter their families were forced to return to their isolated communities, preserving themselves as a guaranteed labor pool.

== Cultural documentation ==
Folklorist Simon J. Bronner writes that while scholar Robert Redfield's sociocultural-based definition of a peasant community is typically used for Asian, African, and European societies, scholar G.H. Stopp used the concept to describe the folk culture of the Cajans.

Writers for the Works Progress Administration reported women in the community wore bright colors, scarves around their hair, fashion jewelry, and more rouge than usual. Stopp and scholar Carol W. Hill wrote that Cajan men preferred to marry mulatto women, while Cajan women preferred to marry white men. They were as a group seen to be avoidant of others.

Cajans were mostly Baptists or Methodists. Writers from the WPA (Note: Works Progress Administration.) described them to be believers in "ha'nts" and conjure, similarly to African-Americans in the Black Belt.

=== Historical identities ===
The name Cajan was an exonym, created by the Alabama State senator L.W. McRae in 1885. They considered the term pejorative. A minority of Cajans identified with the exonym in a 1950 survey.

On the 1950 United States census, enumerators were allowed to use local designations. In Washington County, one investigator found 734 people listed as Indian and 361 listed as Cajun. Using surnames and assumed family relationships, he estimated that 288 people listed as white and 449 listed as Black were also of Cajan lineage in the county. In Mobile County, using similar methods but not the term Cajan, enumerators estimated that the majority identified as white. (Note: 737 people of Cajan heritage were listed as white, 137 as Black, and 86 as Indian.)

Cajans were often reminded of their African ancestry when around white people, but had other identities within their own communities, such as Mexican and, less frequently, Indian. (Note: Researchers Griessman and Henson observed the term Indian to be rejected by some Cajans and not widely used by local white and African-American populations.) Some Cajans self-identified as Black in official records.

== Modern developments ==
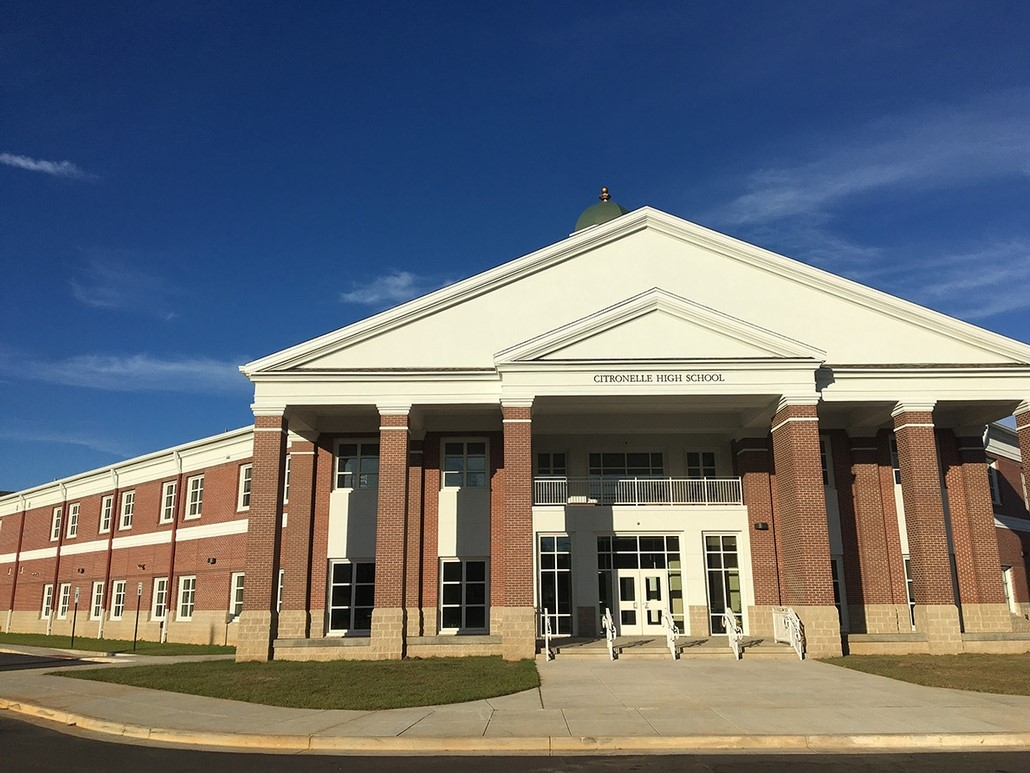
Citronelle High School.

By 1969, most of the community went to desegregated schools. Only Reed Chapel and another school remained as Cajan schools, and both only served elementary students by 1974. An African-American was teaching at one of them by this time. Most students instead went to schools in McIntosh, Mt. Vernon, or Citronelle, improving their schooling conditions. The student body of these schools was mostly Black in McIntosh and mostly white in Citronelle.

=== Career opportunities ===
By 1974, local industries also began to hire Cajans, offering them prosperity and mobility previously denied to them in the lumber industry most had been employed in. Many younger Cajans emigrated to work in areas outside the zone of Cajan settlement for new job offerings. The number of Cajans living near brokers decreased as a result, lowering from 50% to 10% of newly married couples between 1969 and 1970. By 1971, the brokerage system had degraded heavily; it was dissolved later that decade. By 1975, women in the community had begun to enter the workforce.

==== Conditions relative to Black Americans ====
Local businessmen preferred to hire Cajans instead of Black people. Scholar G.H. Stopp suggested this was to "ease the shock of forced integration" after civil rights legislation, as whites would have preferred other non-whites to Black people. He stated they acted as de facto whites in the workplace, while satisfying the de jure requirement of hiring Black people. Griessman and Henson wrote that after learning about minority quotas in chemical plants they applied to, some Cajans felt their chances for employment would increase when listing themselves as Indian rather than white. They said social status of the Cajans was stated to have surpassed that of local Black people post-desegregation, partially due to their improved schooling.

=== Increasing outmigration and assimilation ===
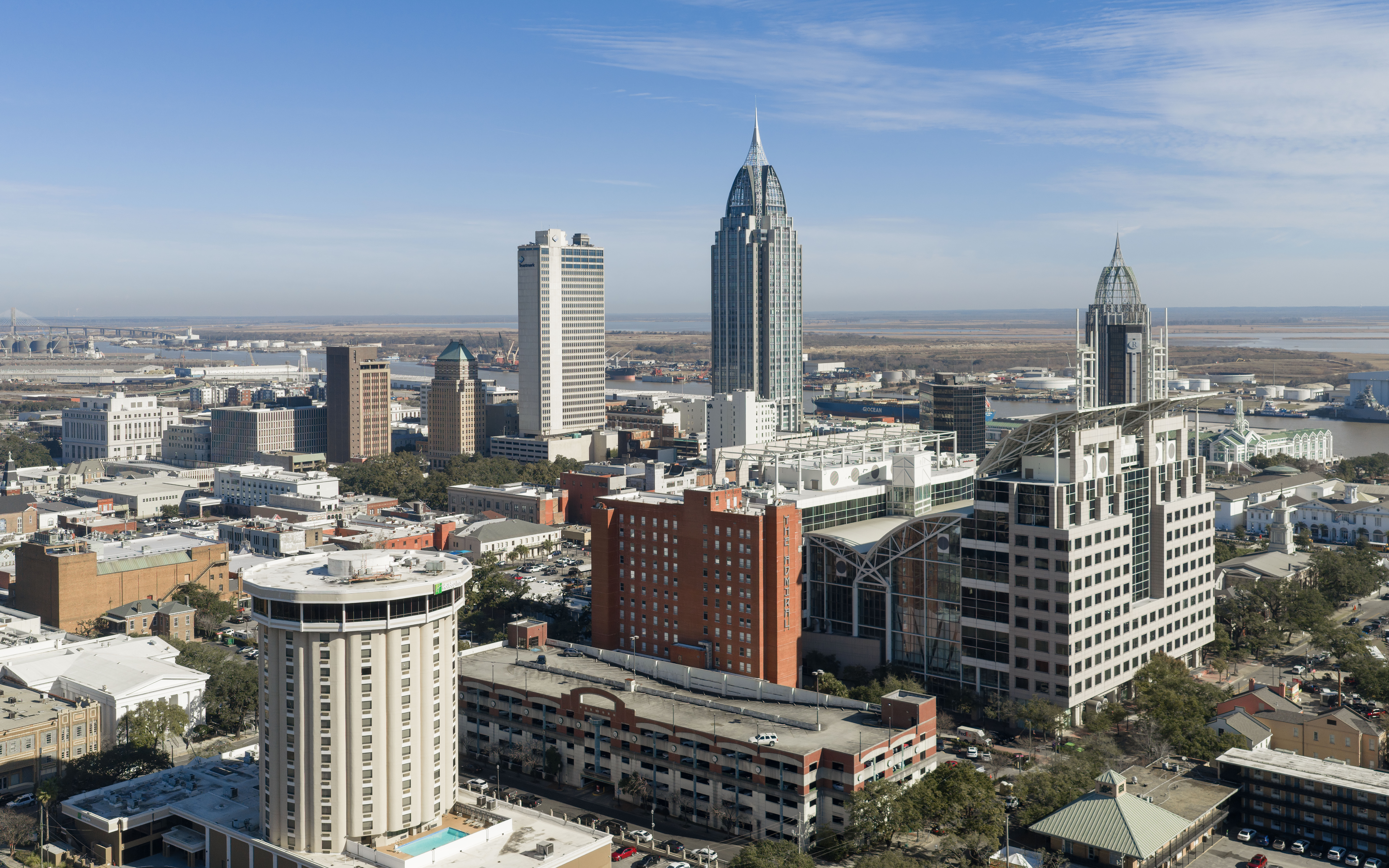
Skyline of Mobile, Alabama.

By 1974, Cajans were frequently emigrating to nearby cities such as Mobile, New Orleans, and Houston. They were not racialized as Black in these cities, and would marry into the dominant group of the area. Researcher Eugene Griessman says that this outmigration and assimilation was mitigated by the high birthrate of the Cajans, and new families marrying into their communities. Only 183 individuals in the Cajan area of settlement identified themselves as Indian on the 1970 census. One of the families descended from the Reeds had mostly gained social acceptance among the white families of the area, and were marked white on an earlier census. When given the option, some Cajans self-identified as Black on the census.

By 1977, both genetic and genealogical analysis suggested they had been outmarrying heavily compared to in the past. (Note: After examining genetic loci of students in Calcedeaver school, Pollitzer, Namboodiri, Coleman et al. measured low levels of homozygosity, which they stated indicated higher levels of recent outmarriage. They suggested new surnames present at lower rates in the group indicated increased outmarriage.) Some common surnames in the group at this time were Bryant, Cole, Daugherty, Patrick, Rivers, Snow, Taylor, and Young. Some individuals labelled Cajan emigrated, assimilating into the dominant populations of urban areas or nearby white communities, while others organized as the MOWA Band of Choctaw Indians, retiring the term amongst themselves.

==== Reclamation of Cajan ====
While some younger members of the group attempted to reclaim the name in the 1970s, with slogans such as "Cajan Power", and "Cajans Are Beautiful!", only a minority of the group had identified as Cajan on the 1950 census.

Carol W. Hill criticized G.H. Stopp for his belief that the "Cajans" would dissolve as a group due to career opportunities and school integration, reasoning that he did not provide an explanation as to why this would occur. Those identifying as Cajan were described to adhere to a specifically Cajan identity in 1972, as opposed to the Lumbee, who adhered to a Native American identity.

=== 21st century ===
Culinary historian Michael W. Twitty describes the Cajans as one of the elements within the "mix" of Mobile, Alabama. By the 2020s, some were observed to have immigrated to Mississippi, while others remained in the Alabamian backcountry. Renate Bartl writes the Cajans in southern Mississippi absorbed a group identifying as Redbones from Slidell, Louisiana. Recorded surnames present among the Cajans in 2021 were Cole, Johnson, Johnston, Smith, Taylor, White, and Williams.

== See also ==
- African Americans in Alabama
- Alabama Constitution of 1901
- Ascribed status
- Black Codes (United States)
- Brandywine people
- Brass Ankles
- Caste: The Origins of Our Discontents
- Chestnut Ridge people
- Class: A Guide Through the American Status System
- Delaware Moors
- Dominickers
- Florida cracker
- Geographical segregation
- Hypodescent
- Jim Crow laws
- Melungeons
- Microhistory
- One-place study
- Pace v. Alabama
- Peasant economics
- People's history
- Racial segregation in the United States
- Redbones
- Rural American history
- Rural diversity
- Rural sociology
- Social identity theory
- South Alabama
- Stars Fell on Alabama
- Stigma management

== Bibliography ==
- Bartl, Renate (2021). American Tri-Racials: African-Native Contact, Multi-Ethnic Native American Nations, and the Ethnogenesis of Tri-Racial Groups in North America (PDF) (PhD thesis). Munich: Ludwig-Maximilians-Universität München. doi:10.5282/edoc.26874 – via Electronic Theses of LMU Munich.
- Hill, Carol W. (May 19, 2003) [1995]. "Who is what? A preliminary enquiry into cultural and physical identity". In Shennan, Stephen J. (ed.). Archaeological Approaches to Cultural Identity. One World Archaeology (2nd ed.). London, UK: Routledge. doi:10.4324/9780203111147. ISBN 0-203-11114-1.
- Griessman, B. Eugene Jr.; Henson, Curtis T. (1975). "The History and Social Topography of an Ethnic Island in Alabama". Phylon. 36 (2). Clark Atlanta University. doi:10.2307/274796.
- Stopp, G. Harry (July 1976). "Cultural Brokers and Social Change in an American Peasant Community". Peasant Studies. 5 (3). University of Pittsburgh: 18–22. ISSN 0149-1547.
- Minton, Gary; Griessman, B. Eugene (November 19, 1974). The Formation and Development of an Ethnic Group: The 'Cajuns' of Alabama. 73rd Annual Meeting of the American Anthropology Association. Mexico City, MX: American Anthropology Association – via Education Resources Information Center.
- Pollitzer, William S.; Namboodiri, Kadambari K.; Coleman, William H.; Finley, Wayne H.; Leyshon, Webster C.; Jennings, Gary C.; Brown, William H. (July 1977). "The Cajuns of Southern Alabama: Morphology and Serology". American Journal of Biological Anthropology. 47 (1). doi:10.1002/ajpa.1330470103.
- Office of Federal Acknowledgement (December 15, 1994). Summary under the Criteria and Evidence for Proposed Finding against Federal Acknowledgment of the MOWA Band of Choctaw (PDF) (Report). Washington, D.C.: United States Department of the Interior.
- Miller, Mark Edwin (2013). Claiming Tribal Identity: The Five Tribes and the Politics of Federal Acknowledgment. Norman: University of Oklahoma Press. ISBN 978-0806143781.
- Flynt, Wayne (February 2016). Poor but Proud: Alabama's Poor Whites (eBook ed.). Tuscaloosa, AL: The University of Alabama Press. ISBN 0-8173-1150-5.
- Hobson, Archie, ed. (1985). "Some Special People". Remembering America: A Sampler of the WPA American Guide Series. New York, NY: Columbia University Press. ISBN 0-231-06050-5.
- Kytle, Jack (1982). "Jake Gaw, Cajan Turpentiner". In Brown, James Seay Jr. (ed.). up before daylight: Life Histories from the Alabama Writers’ Project, 1938-1939. University, AL: The University of Alabama Press. ISBN 0-8173-0092-9.
