= Willard Savoy =

American novelist

- Born: Willard Wilson Savoy; September 13, 1916; Washington, DC, U.S.
- Died: July 8, 1976 (aged 59); Washington, DC
- Occupations: Writer, Public Relations Specialist
- Writing career
- Genres: Novel, television, federal government
- Notable work: Alien Land

Willard Wilson Savoy (September 13, 1916 – July 8, 1976) was an American novelist, writer and public relations specialist. He was born in Washington, DC. Savoy only published one novel Alien Land, which was received with considerable attention and fanfare when it was released in 1949. His second unfinished novel, entitled for some time Michael Gordon, was rejected for publication in 1954 and 1955.

== Early life ==
Savoy was born in Washington, DC in 1916, to a prominent Black family that had deep roots to the city. His great-grandparents, Edward Louis and Elizabeth E. Van Rhodia Butler Savoy, were free African Americans well before the Civil War. Elizabeth Savoy was an anti-slavery activist who aided the Underground Railroad, helping those who had been enslaved to escape north to freedom. Her husband made a successful living as a caterer and "head waiter of Washington" because of the many official parties at which he served including the White House and various embassies. His grandfather Edward Augustine Savoy was a doorman and messenger first hired by Secretary of State Hamilton Fish as a page and then rising to one of the highest government positions possible for an African-American of that time, Chief Messenger to the Secretary of State. He held that position for over 30 of his 64 years, first serving in this position under Secretary John M. Hay. He was a witness to the assassination of James A. Garfield in 1881 and worked for 21 secretaries of state. Savoy's father, Alfred Kiger Savoy, was a principal who became assistant superintendent of the colored division of the District's public schools, the highest position within the school district then available to an African-American, for whom Alfred K. Savoy Elementary School in DC is named. His mother, Laura Wilson Savoy, was an employee of the Bureau of printing and engraving. She was a fair-skinned woman who could pass as white, no doubt inspiring one of the major themes of Alien Land.

Willard Savoy graduated from Dunbar High School, which was still segregated at the time. He then attended Howard University, Fisk University, and the University of Wisconsin studying organic chemistry, though he never received a degree. When World War II began, he joined the U.S. Army Air Corps where he became a First Lieutenant and Lead Navigator in the 618th Bombardment Squadron. He remained in the newly formed Air Force until 1949, during which time he was assigned to the Press Branch at the Pentagon. He managed the Special Interest Unit of the Air Force's Publication Division, preparing information on the activities of Black military personnel worldwide for the use of newspapers, magazines and other publications.

== Alien Land ==
Savoy's one published novel, Alien Land, was released in early 1949 by E.P. Dutton to critical acclaim. It tells the story of a light-skinned African-American man who could pass as white in mid-twentieth-century America. As a child and adolescent caught between Black and white worlds in a segregated society, he experiences racism from both sides. As a student at a Vermont boarding school, Kern is able to "pass" until exposed by a white classmate. He then returns to Washington, DC, his birthplace, to work for a civil rights organization with his father, a prominent attorney. Starting college in the Jim Crow South, he is exposed to violent prejudice, hatred, and racially motivated crimes. Kern returns north, choosing to renounce his race and living for a time with his white grandmother. In the end he reconciles with his mixed heritage and his father, finding peace in an interracial marriage.

Newspapers and journals across the country reviewed Alien Land, with many reviews written by leading authors and critics of the day. The writer Ann Petry (author of The Street), wrote the following of the book for The Saturday Review (April 30, 1949): "Alien Land, by Willard Savoy . . . is written with passion and with anger, so that it has a vitality which makes it linger in the mind. Reduced to its simplest terms it is the story of a man's loss of the sense of personal dignity, a loss that began in his childhood, continued through his adolescence, and into manhood; and of how he struggled to regain it."

== Later years ==
From 1950 to 1952, Willard Savoy worked with the "Marshal Plan" Economic Cooperation Administration's Special Media Division and Far East Program Division. He later worked as a freelance writer and turned to marketing and advertising. A second novel manuscript was rejected by E. P. Dutton in 1954-55 because it criticized segregation in the nation's capitol and considered communism. Savoy died on July 8, 1976, in Washington, DC, at the age of 59. At the time of his death he was deputy director of Information at the Federal Power Commission.

== Publications ==
- Alien Land (New York: E. P. Dutton & Co. Inc., 1949). Reprinted by University Press of New England for the Northeastern Library of Black Literature, 2006, with foreword by Robert B. Stepto (ISBN 978-1555536572).
