= Nanticoke Lenni-Lenape Tribal Nation =

State-recognized tribe and nonprofit organization in New Jersey, U.S.

Nanticoke Lenni Lenape Indians Inc.
- Named after: Nanticoke and Lenni Lenape peoples
- Formation: 1983 (nonprofit)
- Type: 501(c)(3) organization
- Tax ID no.: 22-2214219
- Legal status: active
- Headquarters: Bridgeton, New Jersey
- Location: United States
- Official language: English
- Tribal Chairman: Urie Ridgeway
- Revenue: $277,170 (2023)
- Expenses: $176,288 (2023)
- Website: www.nlltribalnation.org

The Nanticoke Lenni-Lenape Tribal Nation (also known as the Nanticoke Lenni Lenape Inc. or the Nanticoke Lenape) is a state-recognized tribe and 501(c)(3) nonprofit organization. They represent Nanticoke of the Delmarva Peninsula and the Lenape of southern New Jersey and northern Delaware. The state of New Jersey recognizes them as a tribe, and they have maintained elected leadership since the 1970s. They are not a federally recognized tribe. Along with the Nanticoke Indian Association and the Lenape Indian Tribe, both of which are state-recognized as tribes in Delaware, the Nanticoke Lenni-Lenape Tribal Nation are descended from the Delaware Moors, a mixed-race group who were historically legally classified as African Americans.

== About ==
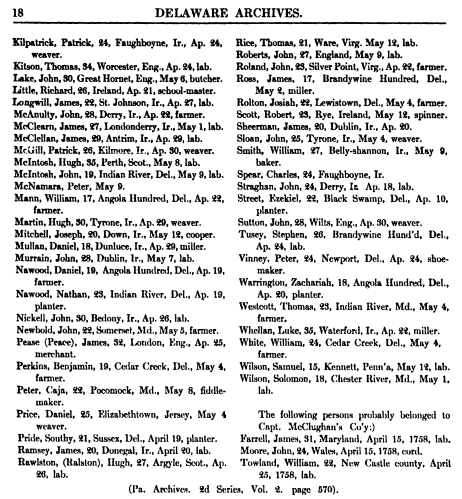
Excerpt from the May 1758 Muster Roll of John McClughan, which the Nanticoke Lenni-Lenape Tribal Nation has described as including documentation of Nanticoke Indians.

The organization shares ancestral and cultural ties with the state-recognized Lenape Indian Tribe of Delaware and the state-recognized Nanticoke Indian Association of Delaware. All three organizations have ancestors who were once known as the Delaware Moors, a mixed-race group in Delaware and New Jersey who were legally classified as African-Americans until 1914, when the State of Delaware reclassified them as a separate, non-Black group.

The federally recognized Delaware Nation regards the Nanticoke Lenni-Lenape Tribal Nation as a fraudulent organization, as they have stated that they "do not acknowledge or work with any non-federally recognized groups that claim Lenape identity or nationhood, which includes “state recognized” groups as we do not agree with state recognition." In a 2023 report, the Delaware Nation referred to the Nanticoke Lenni-Lenape Tribal Nation as a CPAIN (Corporation Posing as an Indigenous Nation).

The federally recognized Delaware Tribe of Indians has issued a resolution which "denounces fabricated Delaware groups and commits to exposing and assisting state and federal authorities in eradicating any group which attempts or claims to operate as a government of the Delaware people". The resolution refers to Lenape heritage groups and state-recognized tribes in Delaware, New Jersey, New York and Pennsylvania as CPAINs.

The Nanticoke Lenni Lenape Inc.'s current headquarters is in Bridgeton, New Jersey. The organization is forbidden from participating in casino gaming and the sale of cigarettes or alcohol, as part of a settlement with the state of New Jersey. The Nanticoke Lenni-Lenape Tribal Nation is not affiliated with the "Unalachtigo Band of the Nanticoke Lenni-Lenape Nation", an organization in southern New Jersey that has neither federal nor state recognition as a tribe.

According to Louise and Edward Heite, several men are listed as Nanticoke Indians on the May 1758 Muster Roll of John McClughan, including Daniel Norwood, Nathan Norwood, and James Westcote.

The Nanticoke Lenni-Lenape Tribal Nation is not federally recognized as a Native American tribe.

Documented descendants of Nanticoke people are citizens of federally recognized tribes and governments, including the Delaware Nation and the Delaware Tribe of Indians in Oklahoma and the Six Nations of the Grand River First Nation in Canada, where some ancestors resettled with the Iroquois after the Revolutionary War.

== Lenape history in New Jersey and Delaware ==
The Lenape were divided among speakers of three major dialects, with language groups occupying particular territories. Each major group was made up of smaller independent but interrelated communities or bands; together, they occupied territory from the northern part of the tribe's ancient homeland at the headwaters of the Delaware River, down to the Delaware Bay, and north into New Jersey, the area around New York City and western Long Island. The Munsee (People of the Stony Country) lived in the north. The Unami (People Down River) and Unalachtigo (People Who Live Near the Ocean) lived in the central and southern parts of the homeland.

The Lenape are historically part of the Algonquian language family, as are most of the Indigenous peoples along the Atlantic coast. Many Algonquian tribes have referred to the Lenape as the “grandfathers” or “ancient ones.”

In the eighteenth century, the British colonists set aside the Brotherton Reservation (1758–1802) in Burlington County, New Jersey, for the Lenape, but colonists continued to encroach on their territory. In 1802, some Lenape migrated from this area to Utica, New York, where they joined the remnant Stockbridge-Munsee for a period. Together, these two communities accepted relocation west to the territory of Wisconsin in the early 19th century, where descendants still occupy a reservation.

== Religious institutions ==
Church congregations have been a means for the Nanticoke Lenni-Lenape Tribal Nation to preserve their way of life and maintain ties with nearby related communities. One of the historical congregations associated with ancestors of organization members, Saint John United Methodist Church of Fordville, New Jersey, is the only church in New Jersey designated as a "Native American church" by the United Methodist Church.

== Governance ==
In 1978, the Nanticoke Lenni-Lenape Tribal Nation established a tribally governed 501(c)3 non-profit community benefit agency, “The Nanticoke Lenni-Lenape Indians of New Jersey.” It is chartered for educational, social, and cultural purposes, to promote the welfare of Native Americans who reside in the Delaware Valley; to extend charity in all forms to those Native Americans in need, giving priority to Nanticoke Lenni-Lenape Indians residing in the Delaware Valley; to establish cultural and instructional facilities; to improve health and welfare, housing, human rights, and economic security; to acquire and preserve land and water areas in a natural scenic or open condition consistent with the heritage of the Native Americans who reside in the Delaware Valley.

In 1982, the tribe believed it received official recognition from the State of New Jersey via Senate Concurrent Resolution Number 73. This was reaffirmed through the tribe's statutory inclusion in the New Jersey State Commission on American Indian Affairs (New Jersey Public Law 1995 c. 295; New Jersey Statutes 52:16A-53 et. seq.).

The largest state-recognized tribe in New Jersey, the Nanticoke Lenni-Lenape Tribal Nation enjoy friendly relations with the nation of Sweden, which acknowledges its tribal identity and sovereignty. In 1988, Sweden celebrated its more than 350-year-old treaty of friendship with the Tribe, dating to the early settlement of Swedes and Finns in the land of the Lenape before Dutch and British colonial powers settled in the area.

The Nanticoke Lenni-Lenape Tribal Nation is governed by a nine-member elected Tribal Council. All council members must be enrolled members of the tribe. The tribe has determined that membership is dependent on blood quantum and documented descent from core families. The Nanticoke Lenni-Lenape Tribe has more than 3,000 enrolled members in more than 1,500 households.

Other Nanticoke and Lenape descendants and extended family who are not members also live in southern New Jersey and the surrounding area. They may participate in many tribal activities. According to the 2000 United States Census, an additional 9000 persons living in Cumberland County, New Jersey area, other than enrolled members, identified as Native Americans. This is a State Designated American Indian Statistical Area (SDAISA), part of the state and federal recognition of certain areas as having significant American Indian populations.

== See also ==
- Brandywine people
  - Piscataway Indian Nation and Tayac Territory
  - Piscataway-Conoy Tribe of Maryland
- Chestnut Ridge people
- Brass Ankles
  - Wassamasaw Tribe of Varnertown Indians
- Delaware Moors
  - Lenape Indian Tribe of Delaware
  - Nanticoke Indian Association
- Dominickers
- Lenape Nation of Pennsylvania
- Lumbee
  - Lumbee Tribe of North Carolina
- Melungeon
  - Carmel Melungeons
- Powhatan Renape Nation
- Ramapough Mountain Indians
- Redbones

== Sources ==
- Babcock, William H. The Nanticoke Indians of Indian River, Delaware. “American Anthropologists, New Series,” Vol. 1, No. 2., April 1899
- Fitzgerald, Neil. "Delaware's Forgotten Minority - The Moors", Delaware Today, January 1972 issue, 10
- Gilbert, Jr., William Harlen. Social Forces, Vol. 2, No. 4. University of North Carolina Press, May 1946
- Gilbert, William H. Surviving Indian Groups of the Eastern United States, Annual Report of the Smithsonian Institution, provided to the Library of Congress, 1948
- Heckwelder, John. History Manners and Customs of the Indian Nations Who Once Inhabited Pennsylvania and the Neighboring States. Philadelphia, PA: Historical Society of Pennsylvania, ed. 1876.
- Heite, Edward F. and Cara Lee Blume. "A Community on McKee Road," Delaware Department of Transportation Archaeology Series No. 109., Camden, Delaware: Heite Consulting, 1994
- Heite, Edward F. and Cara Lee Blume. "Mitsawokett to Bloomsbury: Archaeology and History of an Unrecognized Indigenous Community in Central Delaware", Delaware Department of Transportation Archaeology Series No. 154., Heite Consulting. Camden, Delaware 1998.
- Delaware's Invisible Indians, parts 1 and Heite, Edward F. and Louise Heite. Delaware's Invisible Indians, part 2, Database Online
- Kraft, Herbert C. The Lenape-Delaware Indian Heritage: 10,000 B.C. – A.D. 2000. Shamong, NJ: Lenape Books, 2001.
- Norwood, John R. We Are Still Here: The Tribal Saga of New Jersey's Nanticoke and Lenape Indians. Moorestown, NJ: Native New Jersey, 2007
- Porter, Frank W. III. The Nanticoke. New York, New Haven, London: Chelsea House Publishers, 1987
- Scharf, Thomas. A History of Maryland From The Earliest Period to the Present Day, Vol.1. Baltimore, MD: John B. Piet, 1879
- Speck, Frank G. The Nanticoke Community of Delaware. New York: The Museum of the American Indian, Heye Foundation, 1915
- Speck, Frank G. The Nanticoke and Conoy Indians. Wilmington, Delaware: The Historical Society of Delaware, 1927
- Tayac, Gabrielle Ph.D. and Edwin Schupman. We Have A Story To Tell: The Native Peoples of the Chesapeake Region. Edited by Mark Hirsch. Washington, DC: The National Museum of the American Indian, Smithsonian Institution, 2006
- Weslager, C. A. Delaware’s Forgotten Folk: The Story of the Moors and Nanticokes, Philadelphia, PA: University of Pennsylvania Press, 1943
- Weslager, C. A. The Nanticoke Indians Past and Present, Newark, DE: The University of Delaware Press, 1983
- Zeisberger, David. David Zeisberger’s History of the Northern American Indians, edited by Archer Butler Hubert and William Nathaniel Schwarze. Lewisburg, PA: Wennawoods Publishing, 1999
