= Brandywine people =

Mixed-race group of people in southern Maryland

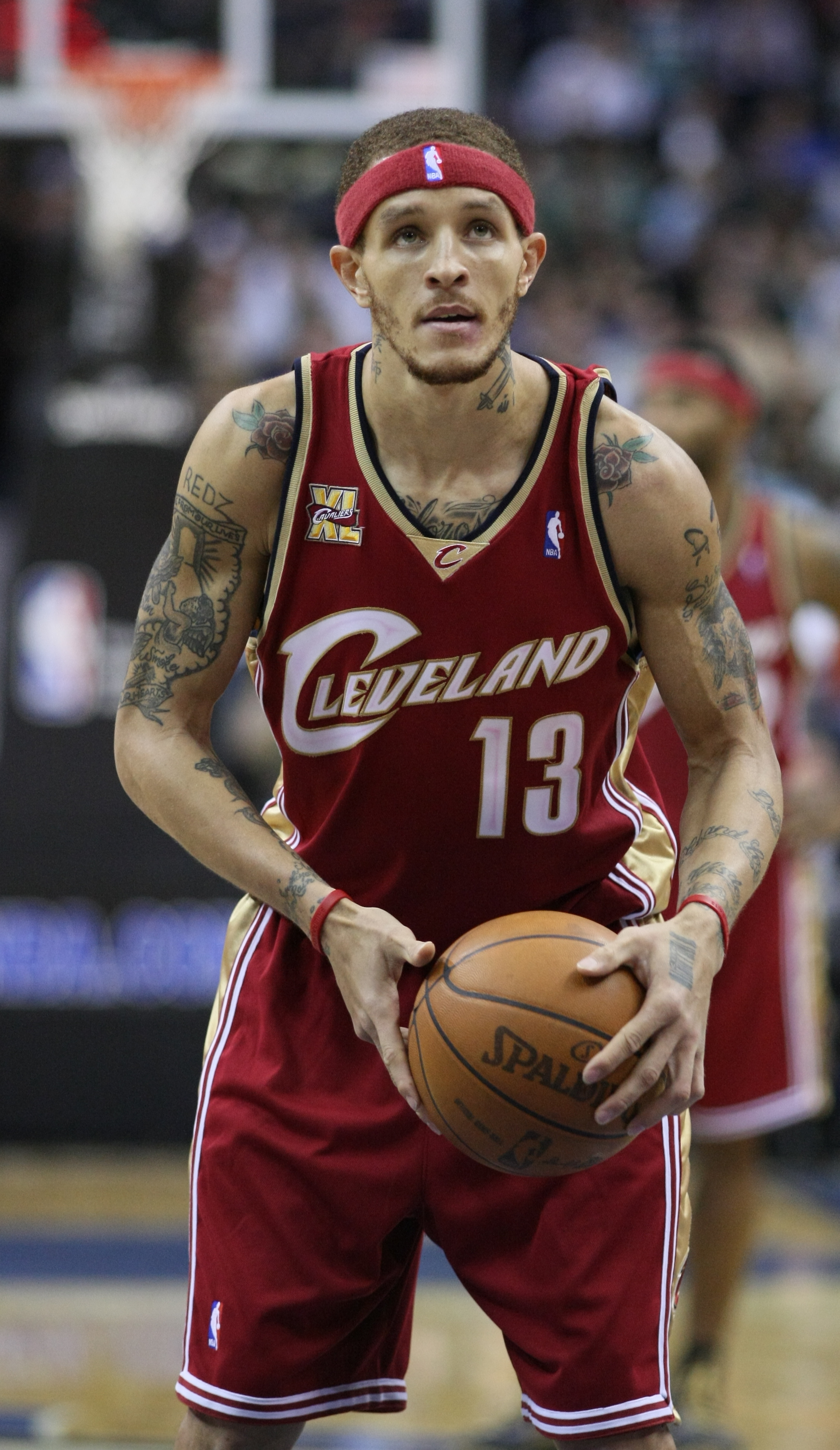
- Delonte West, former professional basketball player from Prince George's County, Maryland.

Total population
- 1790 (census): 190
- 1950 (est.): 750-3000
- 1959 (est.): 5000

Regions with significant populations
- Prince George's and Charles Counties, Maryland

Languages
- English

Religion
- Catholicism

Related ethnic groups
- Melungeons, Carmelites, Delaware Moors, Dominickers, Lumbee, Chestnut Ridge people, Brass Ankles, Free Black people, Free people of color

Brandywine people, or simply the Brandywine (sometimes known as the "Brandywine deme" by sociologists), are a mixed-race group of free African American descent in southern Maryland, some of whom claim to be descended from the Piscataway people. The term "Brandywine people" references the Brandywine area of the Prince George's and Charles County border line where the majority have historically resided.

The sometimes-used label "Wesorts" is regarded as derogatory and a pejorative by some. It was listed as a self-identified "Other race" on the 2000 census.

Families with the surnames Proctor, Swann, Savoy, Newman, Harley, Butler and Thompson comprise the group, documented to be descended from free Black ancestors. They are described as a network of lighter-skinned African-American families that practice intermarriage.

== History ==
Modern genealogical analysis traces the Brandywine people as originating from free African-Americans, in this case the free offspring of Black men and white women. However, a 1664 law enacted by the Maryland General Assembly dictated that any children of enslaved fathers would be enslaved for life, lessening the willingness of the Brandywine to disclose parentage. In 1681, Eleanor Butler married Charles, a slave of Nigerian origin, and their children were enslaved. Several members of the Savoy family were freed from 1704-1705, later becoming a visible free African-American tenant farmer family in Southern Maryland with social capital.

From 1702 to 1720, there were nine court convictions in Charles County for illegitimacy from women with Brandywine surnames. In Maryland, unlike women who had children with Native Americans and faced the lesser charge of fornication, white and free mulatto women who had children with Black men were sentenced to seven years of servitude under the charge of illegitimacy. One of these was Elizabeth Proctor, who had two mulatto children between 1705-1709. In 1740, she left her estate to her elder son, Charles. The Proctor family owned farmland in Maryland by 1762, and some members later became Brandywine people. In 1787, Mary Butler, a descendant of Eleanor and Charles, successfully sued for her freedom, after which other members of the Butler family filed similar suits. Members of the Butler family later became part of the Brandywine. In 1788, Maryland ceded land to form the capital, where members of the Proctor, Butler, and Savoy families were residing.

By the 1790 United States census, the Brandywine numbered 190 people, or 36.2% of people marked mulatto in Charles County. At this time, Brandywine people were regionally segregated by surname, with the integration of the six core families into a population isolate still in its early stages.

=== Antebellum to mid-20th century ===
On the 1830 Census, the district with the largest proportion of Brandywine in the county also had the most varied surnames. Many free Black people with Brandywine surnames began living in the District of Columbia later on, often descending from white women, which they would present as proof of their freedom. In 1865, Oswell Swann, a free Black man of Brandywine lineage, was paid to be a guide for John Wilkes Booth during his escape. He later informed to Union soldiers.

Past 1870, the core six Brandywine surnames were joined by ten "marginal" surnames entering through in-marriage. They were likely to be mostly of free Black origin from the Antebellum South, but three were possibly from white men. Core families practiced higher rates of endogamy than marginal ones, but Brandywine people still had higher rates of exogamy than other local populations.

It was recorded in 1939 that some Black Marylanders disliked the Brandywine for disdaining them socially. A 1940 report noted them to have been illiterate due to a refusal to attend Black schools. However by the 1950s, Brandywine people were recorded to attend both white and Black schools, and were engaging in outmarriage at increasing rates. They sat in the pews behind white people at church, while Black people sat in the balcony; a similar arrangement was noted in the nearby graveyard. Some were noted to be living in Washington D.C. and Baltimore by this time, with a general trend of migration to urban areas over the decade. Unlike other urban minorities at the time, they tended to not concentrate in ghettos, and thus had higher rates of outmarriage. Free African-Americans in DC began working for the government, such as Edward Augustine Savoy, whose parents had both worked for Hamilton Fish before he hired him in 1869.

=== Midcentury to present ===
Scholar Jodi McFarland Friedman noted that by 1970, the predominant origin narrative of the group ignored African ancestry, which she proposed was because classification as Black conferred no advantages during the first half of the 20th century. She also noted writers tended to downplay the African ancestry of the Brandywine, which she suggested was informed by a climate of pro-segregation and eugenicist sentiments in America at the time. Some of the Brandywine began moving away by this period, passing as white in new areas.

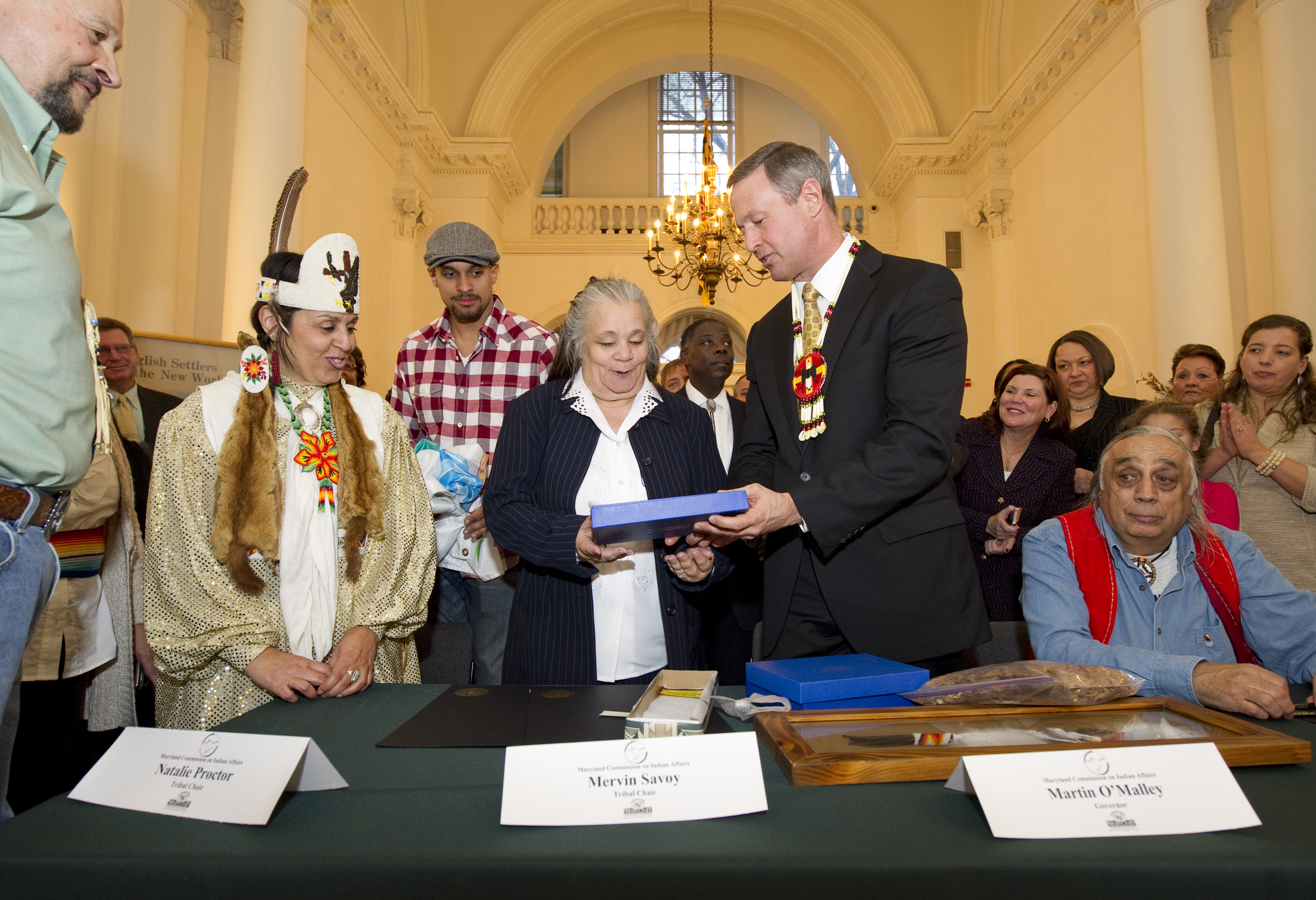
Piscataway Indian Nation and Piscataway Conoy Tribe recognized by Governor Martin O'Malley in 2012

Philip Sheridan Proctor and his son, both of Proctor lineage, founded the Piscataway Indian Nation and received government funding in the 1970s, citing the ostracization of Black people from their community in their petition. Their claim to indigeneity was challenged by sociologist Thomas Brown, wherein he stated their narrative of separateness from African-Americans was false, noting the group intermarrying with Black people before the Civil War, only developing a separate identity from recently freed slaves during Jim Crow to obtain separate schools and churches.

After Philip's death, the organization split into three entities. They attempted to receive access to Piscataway remains in the year 2000, but failed due to the split and a lack of federal recognition. Members of the Piscataway Indian Nation stated the other two entities were of Wesort [sic] ancestry, rather than Piscataway, with Gabrielle Tayac stating members of Proctor families in other entities only shared free Black ancestors with Philip. She claimed that the members of her own entity did not possess Wesort [sic] lineage.

In 1990, James E. Proctor Jr., another member of the Proctor family, was elected as the delegate for District 27A, which represents the Brandywine area, and was a member of the Legislative Black Caucus of Maryland. His wife Susie Proctor, also a Proctor, became the delegate for the same district after his death in 2015. Academic J. Lorand Matory writes that members of the Proctor and Savoy families become more likely to identify as Black after attending Howard University, sometimes distinguishing them from their families.

== Genetic analysis ==
A 1969 report by Frank B. Livingstone on the Brandywine concluded that a deleterious gene for sickle-cell anemia had been magnified over time in the population. He stated this was due to high rate of endogamous marriage in the isolate, which he claimed was ninety percent. A 1966 report by Carl Witkop documented albinism (tyrosinase-positive albinism) among the Brandywine, which he credited to inbreeding. The group was later incorrectly characterized as having the highest rate of albinism on earth.

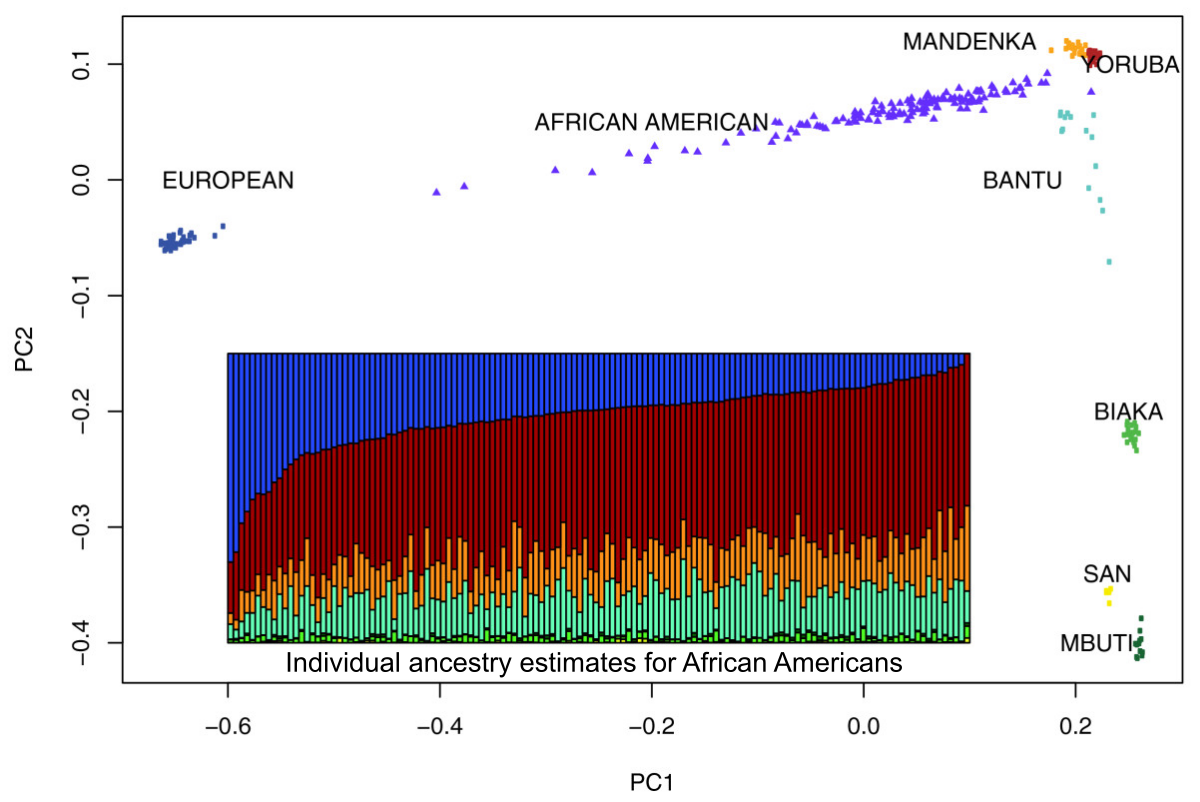
Sub-Saharan African
European
Admixture proportions of 128 African Americans. Each vertical bar represents an individual. Note individuals on far left of chart with higher levels of European admixture.

In 2016, Rock Newman, producer and WHUT-TV radio host of Brandywine origin, had geneticist Rick Kittles on his show to present the results of his DNA analysis. The testing showed Newman to be of 78-82% European and 18-22% Sub-Saharan African descent. Kittles noted the results reflected Newman's family history, referencing the part of Maryland he grew up in. He stated that Newman's parents had similar levels of European admixture, and that certain African-American families with light skin and higher European admixture maintained their ancestry proportion across generations via mate preference (endogamy), specifically across the East Coast of the United States. When Newman inquired about Amerindian admixture, Kittles replied that he did not have any. J. Lorand Matory describes the Brandywine as a network of lighter-skinned families in the eastern United States that practice intermarriage, similar to the Louisiana Creoles.

Dentinogenesis imperfecta type III is limited to the Brandywine people, associated with mutations in the gene Dentin sialophosphoprotein. Studies have suggested it may be a lower-severity variant of Dentinogenesis imperfecta Type II.

== In literature ==
Wayne Karlin's novel The Wished For Country (2002) represents the origins and struggles of the Brandywine as a multicultural people in the early days of Maryland's first European settlement at St. Mary's City. The Los Angeles Times reviewed The Wished-For Country as a contribution to the history of "the common people," calling the book "an attempt in novel form to bring to life the original Wesorts and their turbulent world."

Leslie Tucker, an African-American with descent from the Brandywine people, and Henry Horenstein published We Sort of People in 2006, which referred to them simply as "Proctors". The book contains pictures and interviews with Brandywine people, often from Leslie's family.

== See also ==
- Agnes Kane Callum
- Alabama Cajans
  - MOWA Band of Choctaw Indians
- Ben-Ishmael Tribe
- Brass Ankles
  - Wassamasaw Tribe of Varnertown Indians
  - Santee Indian Organization
- Caleb Williams
- Chestnut Ridge people
- Delaware Moors
  - Lenape Indian Tribe of Delaware
  - Nanticoke Indian Association
  - Nanticoke Lenni-Lenape Tribal Nation
- Dominickers
- High yellow
- Jim Proctor
- Lumbee
- Melungeons
  - Carmel Melungeons
- Powhatan Renape Nation
- Nanjemoy, Maryland
- Pedro Swann
- Ramapough Mountain People
- Redbones
- Willard Savoy
