= William S. Pollitzer =

American anatomist (1923–2002)

Dr. William Sprott Pollitzer (May 6, 1923 – March 12, 2002) was an American anatomist. He was a professor of the University of North Carolina at Chapel Hill, and past president of the American Association of Physical Anthropologists (from 1979 to 1981), and the Human Biology Council (1986–1988).

Pollitzer was born on May 6, 1923, in Charleston, South Carolina. He grew up in Greenville, South Carolina. He died on March 12, 2002, at UNC Hospital. He was survived by his wife, brother, two daughters, and six grandchildren.

Since 2013, Pollitzer has been listed on the Advisory Council of the National Center for Science Education.

The William S. Pollitzer Prize was created in honor of him.
