= Lenape Indian Tribe of Delaware =

State-recognized tribe and non-profit organization in Delaware

Lenape Indian Tribe of Delaware Inc.
- Type: 501(c)(3) organization
- Tax ID no.: 51-0335004
- Headquarters: Cheswold, Delaware
- Location: United States
- Members: 225
- Official language: English
- Website: www.lenapeindiantribeofdelaware.com

The Lenape Indian Tribe of Delaware Inc. is a state-recognized tribe and non-profit organization in the US state of Delaware. It does not have federal recognition as an American Indian tribe. Ancestors of organization members were historically known as Delaware Moors and classified as African Americans by the State of Delaware.

== History ==
The organization gained official recognition in Delaware on August 3, 2016. The group has around 225 members.

The federally recognized Delaware Nation regards the Lenape Indian Tribe of Delaware as a fraudulent organization, as they have stated that they "do not acknowledge or work with any non-federally recognized groups that claim Lenape identity or nationhood, which includes “state recognized” groups as we do not agree with state recognition." In a 2023 report, the Delaware Nation referred to the Lenape Indian Tribe of Delaware as a CPAIN (Corporation Posing as an Indigenous Nation).

The federally recognized Delaware Tribe of Indians has issued a resolution which "denounces fabricated Delaware groups and commits to exposing and assisting state and federal authorities in eradicating any group which attempts or claims to operate as a government of the Delaware people". The resolution refers to Lenape heritage groups and state-recognized tribes in Delaware, New Jersey, New York and Pennsylvania as CPAINs.

Members of the organization were once known as "the Moors" or the "Delaware Moors". Moors were sometimes listed as "M" on official documentation, such as state driver's licenses. A 1948 Smithsonian report referred to them as the "Moors of Kent County, Delaware". Prior to the state's recognition of the tribe, the Delaware Moors were considered "Mulatto" or of African-American descent. The Lenape Indian Tribe is related through ancestry and cultural ties to the state-recognized Nanticoke Indian Association in Delaware and the state-recognized Nanticoke Lenni-Lenape Tribal Nation in New Jersey, both of whose ancestors were known as Moors.

In 2021, the organization acquired 11 acres of land near Fork Branch Nature Preserve, with the assistance of the State of Delaware, a private financier, and an environmental conservation group. This was part of the Lenape historic territory. Long after the colonial period, ancestors of group members had attended a small schoolhouse that formerly existed on property near the acquired land. It is also near a former Lenape cemetery and church.

== See also ==
- Brandywine people
  - Piscataway Indian Nation and Tayac Territory
  - Piscataway-Conoy Tribe of Maryland
- Brass Ankles
  - Wassamasaw Tribe of Varnertown Indians
- Delaware Moors
  - Nanticoke Indian Association
  - Nanticoke Lenni-Lenape Tribal Nation
- Dominickers
- Lenape Nation of Pennsylvania
- Lumbee
  - Lumbee Tribe of North Carolina
- Melungeons
  - Carmel Melungeons
- Powhatan Renape Nation
- Ramapough Mountain Indians
- Redbones
