= Brass Ankles =

Multiracial ethnic group in the United States

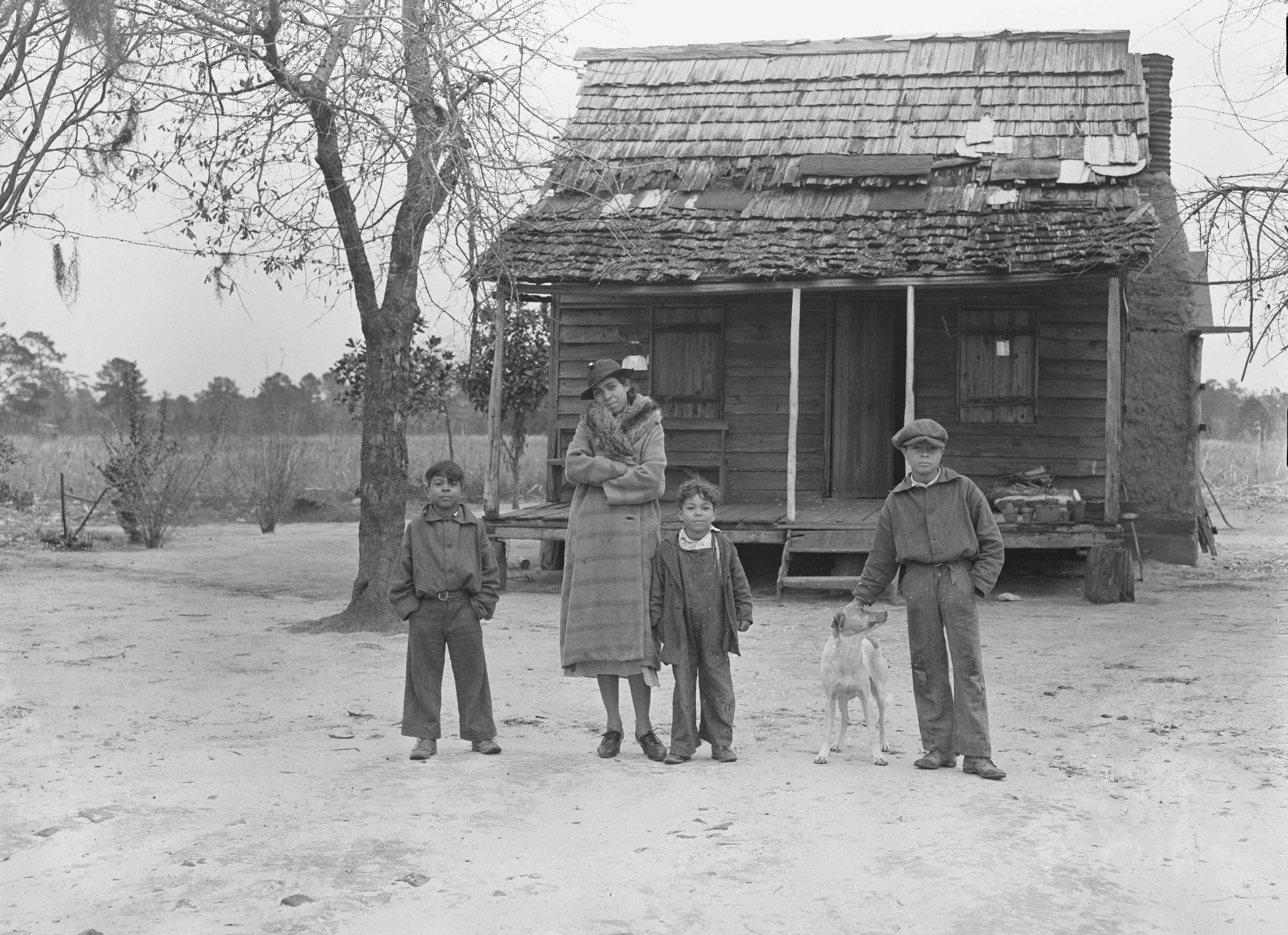
- Brass Ankles in Summerville, South Carolina, 1938

Regions with significant populations
- Holly Hill, South Carolina, eastern United States

Languages
- English

Religion
- Predominantly Baptist

Related ethnic groups
- Melungeon, Lumbee, Beaver Creek Indians, Alabama Cajans, Redbones of Louisiana and Texas, Haliwa-Saponi

The Brass Ankles of South Carolina, sometimes referred to as Croatan, lived in the swamp areas of Goose Creek, South Carolina and Holly Hill, South Carolina (Crane Pond). Many of them are direct descendants of Robert Sweat and Margaret Cornish. Margaret Cornish was documented to be a Black woman living in Surry County, Virginia in 1610, who had a "mulatto" child with Robert Sweat according to records. She had previously had a child with John Graweere, one of the First Africans in Virginia.

== History ==
Although Brass Ankles were of mixed ancestry and free before the American Civil War, after Reconstruction, white Democrats regained power in the South and imposed racial segregation and white supremacy under Jim Crow laws. United States Census surveys included a category of "mulatto" until 1930 when the powerful Southern bloc in Congress pushed through requirements to have people classified only as black or white. By that time, most Southern states had passed laws under which persons of any known black ancestry were required to be classified in state records as black, under what is known as the "one-drop rule" of hypodescent.

The binary classifications required individuals to be classified as white or black, even if they had long been recorded and identified as "Indian" (Native American) or mixed race. However, most self-identified as Croatan according to death certificates.

The surnames repeatedly represented among the Brass Ankles according to the 1910 Holly Hill, SC Census records have included: Bryant, Weatherford, Platt, Pye, Jackson, Chavis, Bunch, Driggers, Sweat (Swett), Williams, Russell, Scott, Wilder, and Goins. Some of these also are commonly represented among other mixed-race groups, such as the Melungeons in Tennessee and the Lumbee people in North Carolina - or Free black people from the Tidewater Region, such as the Chavis family, John Gowen, or Emanuel Driggus, whom they are documented to have descent from. According to genealogical analysis, the Sweat, Chavis, and Driggers families were among the first settlers of Marlboro County, South Carolina.

Numerous people of mixed race have lived in a section of Orangeburg County near Holly Hill called Crane Pond. The term "brass ankles" generally was applied to those of mixed ancestry, one can also find the term Brassankles being applied to the mixed race, families of nearby Dorchester and Colleton County, South Carolina. They often had a large majority of white ancestry and would have been considered legally white in early 19th-century society.

Some people formerly classified as "Brass Ankles" have been identified as among ancestors of members of the five state-recognized tribes in South Carolina in 2005, such as the Wassamasaw Tribe of Varnertown Indians. Because such tribe members often had multiracial ancestry including Africans, and their white neighbors did not understand much about "Croatan" culture, they were often classified as mulatto by census enumerators, who were most concerned about African ancestry. After 1930, when the US census dropped the Mulatto classification at the instigation of the southern white Democratic Congressional block, such multiracial people were often thereafter classified as black, a designation in the South used for anyone visibly "of color".

Dubose Heyward, author of Porgy and Bess, with music by George Gershwin, wrote a play about the Brass Ankles, set in the aftermath of the Civil War. Some Brass Ankles in the community of Summerville, South Carolina identified as "Summerville Indians." During the early part of the twentieth century, when public schools were segregated for white or black students, the Summerville Indians and other Brass Ankle groups gained state approval to establish some local, separate schools for their own Indian children. Having come from families free long before the American Civil War, they did not want to send their children to school with descendants of freedmen. The Eureka "Ricka" school in Charleston County was an example of such an Indian school. The Haliwa-Saponi were previously referred to as Brass Ankles colloquially by locals.

== See also ==
- Ben-Ishmael Tribe
- Brandywine people
  - Piscataway Indian Nation and Tayac Territory
  - Piscataway-Conoy Tribe of Maryland
- Delaware Moors
  - Lenape Indian Tribe of Delaware
  - Nanticoke Indian Association
  - Nanticoke Lenni-Lenape Tribal Nation
- Melungeon
  - Carmel Melungeons
- Creels of Creeltown
- Free Negro
- Lumbee
  - Lumbee Tribe of North Carolina
- Moors Sundry Act of 1790
- Ramapough Mountain People
- Redbones
- Alabama Cajans
  - MOWA Band of Choctaw Indians
- Turks of South Carolina
  - Sumter Tribe of Cheraw Indians
- Santee Indian Organization

== References in popular culture ==
- Play by Dubose Heyward about Brass Ankles.
