= Redbone (ethnicity) =

Multi-racial culture in Louisiana

Redbones
- 1950 Map of Redbone settlements in Louisiana.

Total population
- ~3000 (1950, est.)

Regions with significant populations
- Southwestern Louisiana

Languages
- English

Religion
- Baptist, Pentecostalism

Related ethnic groups
- Melungeons, Carmelites, Dominickers, Lumbee, Beaver Creek Indians, Chestnut Ridge people, Brandywine people, Brass Ankles, Free Black people, Free people of color

Redbone is a term historically used in much of the Southern United States to denote a multiracial individual or culture. In Louisiana, the term Redbones refers to specific geographically and ethnically distinct groups.

Among African-Americans the term has been separately utilized as an aspect of colorism in reference for light-skinned people, particularly African American women with red undertones.

== Definition ==
In Louisiana, the Redbone cultural group consists mainly of the families of migrants to the state following the Louisiana Purchase in 1803. The term Redbone became disfavored as it was a pejorative nickname applied by others; however, starting around 1990, the term has begun to be used as the preferred description for some groups, including the Louisiana Redbones.

== Louisiana and Texas Redbones ==
Map of Louisiana and Texas showing parishes and counties historically associated with Louisiana Redbone people. Traditional Redbone parishes and counties Louisiana Texas

The Louisiana Redbones historically lived in geographically and socially isolated communities in the southwestern Louisiana parishes, ranging from Sabine Parish in the northwest and Rapides Parish near the center of the state down to Calcasieu Parish in the southwest, including parts of Orange County, Texas and Newton County, Texas. This area is roughly coextensive with what was once known as the Neutral Ground or Sabine Free State, an area of disputed sovereignty from 1806 to 1821 that was primarily bound on the east by the Calcasieu River and the Sabine River on the west. Academically, the group has been termed "under-researched."

=== Origins ===
The ancestral families of the Redbones descended from free African-Americans originating in the Jamestown Colony, who were of Angolan origin. They came from South Carolina, migrating soon after the United States acquired Louisiana in 1803, although some families came from other Southeastern states. The Ashworth, Dial, Perkins, Sweat, and Bunch families of the Redbones migrated from the Pendleton District of South Carolina to the Neutral Ground in Louisiana. The Dyal families of the Redbones are direct descendants of Benjamin Doll, and the Redbone Bunch family descends from John Bunch, a mulatto man who petitioned the Virginia Council requesting the right to marry a white woman.

==== Initial settlement ====
A review of newspaper articles, land grants, census records and other documents referring to the Redbones indicates that the main settlements of Redbones to southwestern and south central Louisiana and southeastern Texas took place over the course of many years, although some members of Redbone families are noted as settling in the Neutral Ground before 1818 when the land was finally and officially considered part of the United States. The Ashworth family, described as Melungeons, are stated by author Tim Hashaw to be the first non-Mexican ranchers in Texas. They had settled near Orange by the 1830s. The ambiguity of the origins of the members of the Redbone community and the cultural attitudes held by those living in the same region as the Redbone community but who were not part of it is shown in a letter written in 1893 by Albert Rigmaiden, Calcasieu parish treasurer, to McDonald Furman, a South Carolinian who conducted private ethnological research.

=== Historical record ===
Historically, members of the Redbone ethnic group lived in three areas. One community lived along Ten Mile Creek in Rapides Parish and Allen Parish. Members of this community were referred to as "Ten Milers" or as "Red Bones." in the 19th century. The Baptist minister Joseph Willis settled in this community. A second community was along Bearhead creek in what is now Beauregard Parish. A third community was established in Newton County, Texas and Orange County, Texas. 19th century newspapers tended to refer to members of this community simply as "mulattos," and members of the Texas community were not able to vote.

In the frontier of Southwestern Louisiana, the settlers successfully resisted classification as non-White. In 1837 and 1849, several of the members of the Redbone community were indicted for illegal voting on the charge that they were of color rather than White. The state court found them all not guilty, thus establishing that the Redbone community would be legally considered white in the state of Louisiana.

However, references to the Redbone community and its members in 19th century newspapers tend to be wildly divergent, ranging from making no mention of racial makeup, to stating that the members were White, to stating that the members were African American to stating that the members were of Indian extraction to the assertion that the members were of unspecified mixed race.

==== Conflicts with other settlers ====
Two incidents of violence in Louisiana are particularly notable, one due to the statement of Webster Talma Crawford and one due to the amount of newspaper coverage the incident received. The Westport Fight occurred December 24, 1881 in southern Rapides Parish. According to the Crawford account, friction between the more recent settlers and the Redbones had been simmering for much of the month before exploding into a fight that involved several families in the community and ended in the burning down of a store owned by some of the recent non-Redbone settlers. The Bearhead Creek incident took place in what is now southern Beauregard Parish on August 2, 1891. This battle also occurred due to similar tensions between Redbone and more recent, non-Redbone settlers. It left six men dead and several others wounded.

In Texas, one incident of violence is notable. In May 1856 in the town of Madison (now Orange, Texas), Orange County, Clark Ashworth was arrested for the theft of a hog. Ashworth was bound over for trial and his bond was paid by his cousin Sam Ashworth. Sam and a friend met the deputy sheriff Samuel L Deputy who had arrested Clark on these charges and Sam challenged him to a gun fight. The deputy sheriff arrested Sam Ashworth on the charges of abusive language from Negroes. Justice of the Peace A. N. Reading ruled that Sam Ashworth was a mulatto and not exclusively black, but neither was he white. Reading then sentenced Ashworth to 30 lashes on the bare back. The sheriff, Edward C. Glover, who was friendly to members of the Redbone community, allowed Sam to escape before sentence could be carried out. Sam Ashworth and his cousin, Jack Bunch, then murdered deputy sheriff Samuel Deputy as he crossed Sabine river with his friend A. C. Merriman. Sheriff Glover organized a posse to hunt for Ashworth but only included Glover's and Ashworth's friends. The posse did not find the wanted men. Thereafter, other attempts were made to find Ashworth and Bunch that were not successful. In the aftermath of this incident, members of the Redbone community in Orange County were harassed; their homes and businesses were burned and plundered. Many living in Orange County moved to Louisiana. Over the coming weeks, a war raged between two groups, The Orange County War of 1856. Those in support of Glover and the Redbones became known as "regulators" while those who supported Merriman became known as "moderators."

These incidents illustrate the friction between some (mainly new) non-Redbone settlers to the region and the existing Redbone population. It is incidents such as these that may have cemented the non-Redbone view of this population as being both clannish and violent. The census records from the early to late 19th century list many non-Redbone families settling in the same regions as the Redbones, and these settlers, from the evidence of the records, lived peacefully with members of the Redbone families, even, in many cases, marrying into Redbone families.

==== Classification under Jim Crow ====
During the era of mandated racial segregation under Jim Crow laws (c. 1870s to 1965) schools accepted Redbone students as white and a review of United States Census records in the late 19th and early 20th century shows that families traditionally considered as members of the Redbone community were mainly (although not always) recorded as white. Additionally, according to the marriage and census records, individuals who were from these families married either other members of the Redbone community or individuals who were listed in the census records as white and not members of the Redbone community.

=== Culture ===
Redbones and other nearby population isolates, 1950.

Redbones spoke English, and were mostly Baptist, with some Pentecoastals, unlike the other mixed-race peoples of south-west Louisiana. One parish agent noted them to occupy better land than others in his area, but they were seen to have small plots of farmland, mainly growing corn. Similarly to the Dominickers, they were sometimes referred to as "Dominics". They were known to work as distillers. In 1950, Redbone housing was documented to sometimes be built from scraps obtained from the lumber industry, and tended to not have a standard shape or form. Some Redbones had manufactured stoves and refrigerators in their houses by the same time.

==== Cattle techniques ====
The methodology used by Redbones to tend to cattle was developed in South Carolina by their ancestors on the Peedee River, and was then synthesized with Spanish cattle culture in Texas. Tim Hashaw suggests techniques such as bulldogging, steer wrestling, open ranges, and corrals were popularized by Angolan-descended cattle herders in 1600s Colonial Virginia. He concludes these techniques were introduced into Texas by the Ashworth family.

== In media ==
=== In literature ===
- Campbell, Will D. The Glad River, 1982
- Greg Iles. Natchez Burning, 2014,
- James Lee Burke. Morning for Flamingos, 1990

=== In film ===
- In the film The 6th Man (1997), R.C. St John (played by Michael Michele), in reference to her light colored skin.
- In the Netflix series Master of None (2015), Denise (played by Lena Waithe) uses the term to refer to a light skinned black person.
- In the television series P-Valley (2020), Autumn Knight (played by Elarica Johnson), in reference to her heritage/ethnicity.
- In the television series "Insecure", Issa Dee (played by Issa Rae) uses the term to refer to Nathan, a fair skinned black love interest.

=== In music ===
- The American funk rock band Redbone, formed in 1969, is named after the term as the founding members were all of mixed ancestry.
- The song "Redbone" by Cassandra Wilson from her 1993 album Blue Light 'til Dawn describes a troubled woman of Redbone heritage.
- The song "Redbone" by Childish Gambino from his 2016 album Awaken, My Love! describes paranoia and infidelity within a romantic relationship.

== See also ==
- Ashworth Act
- Ben-Ishmael Tribe
- Brandywine people
  - Piscataway Indian Nation and Tayac Territory
  - Piscataway-Conoy Tribe of Maryland
- Brass Ankles
  - Wassamasaw Tribe of Varnertown Indians
- Dominickers
- Melungeon
  - Carmelites
- Sabine Free State
- Adams–Onís Treaty
- Regulator–Moderator War
- Cajuns
- Mulatto
- Louisiana Creole people
- High yellow
- Alabama Cajans
  - MOWA Band of Choctaw Indians

== Bibliography ==
- Gillmer, Jason A. (2017). Finkelman, Paul; Huebner, Timothy S. (eds.). Slavery and Freedom in Texas: Stories from the Courtroom, 1821–1871. Southern Legal Studies. Athens, GA: The University of Georgia Press. ISBN 9780820351322. LCCN 2016055423.
- Mills, Gary B. (2013). Mills, Elizabeth Shown (ed.). The Forgotten People: Cane River's Creoles of Color (Revised ed.). Baton Rouge, LA: Louisiana State University Press. ISBN 978-0-8071-3713-0.
- Hashaw, Tim (2006). Children of Perdition. Melungeons and the Struggle of Mixed America. Macon, GA: Mercer University Press. ISBN 9780881460742.
