= Carmel Melungeons =

Mixed-race ethnicity in Kentucky and Ohio from the antebellum era

- Carmel Melungeon family and house, c. 1950.

Regions with significant populations
- United States ( Ohio, Kentucky)
- Carmel, Ohio (Highland County): 150 (1947)
- Magoffin County, Kentucky: 200 (1950)

Languages
- Appalachian English

Religion
- Christianity, Holiness movement

Related ethnic groups
- Melungeons, Lumbee, Pee Dee Lumbee, Beaver Creek Indians, Redbones, Free people of color, Haliwa-Saponi, Brandywine people, Chestnut Ridge people, Brass Ankles, Free Blacks
- Population data from Price (1950).

The Carmel Melungeons, also known as Carmelites, Carmel Indians, or Carmel Hill people (pronounced Car'-mul) were a group of Melungeons who migrated to Highland County, Ohio from Magoffin County, Kentucky. The most common surnames among the families were Gibson, Nichols and Perkins. The ancestors of the group originated from Melungeon communities in eastern Kentucky, who were descended from free Black people in colonial Virginia.

== History ==
Migrating from Virginia, North Carolina, and Tennessee, the mixed-race ancestors of the Carmelites first appeared in Magoffin County on the 1810 census. The group were listed as free Black, mulatto, and white in Kentucky prior to the American Civil War. By the 1870 census, they had begun to reside in Carmel, under the surnames Nichols, Perkins, and Gibson. Their traditional area of settlement was to the southeast of the intersection of Ohio state routes SR 506 and SR 753.

Map of historic Carmel Melungeon settlement in Ohio.

=== Ancestral origins ===
Genealogical documentation indicates the ancestry of the Carmel Melungeons can be traced to free African Americans in Virginia before the American Revolution. Author Tim Hashaw states they were originally of Angolan origin. Free African Americans were mostly mixed-race children of early unions during the colonial period between free or indentured white women, and African men who were either indentured servants, free, or enslaved. According to partus sequitur ventrem, children were born into the social status of their mothers in the 17th-century Virginia colony. Hashaw and genealogist Paul Heinegg state that the Carmelites shared these free Black origins with the Lumbee, Redbones, Haliwa-Saponi, and Brass Ankles. According to genetic analysis, the Gibson and Nichols families are of paternal European and African origins, via Y-DNA haplogroups R1b1b2 and E1b1a, and maternal European origins, all possessing mtDNA haplogroup H. The Perkins family descends from Esther Perkins of Accomack County, a black indentured servant who had a mulatto child in 1730.

=== Migration and assimilation ===
During the late 1940s, two families of Carmelites were living in Sinking Spring, and several more resided in Cynthiana. By 1963, some of them were seen moving to the cities of Hillsboro, Dayton, Columbus, Springfield, and Akron. They did not remain a distinct group in the 21st century, having married into the local population. Authors John S. Kessler and Donald B. Ball suggest their settlement disappeared due to steady outmigration from 1940-1970. They noted the absence of infant burials after 1971, and the increasing proportion of middle-aged burials near Carmel after 1950, both indicating the absence of younger adults in the area.

== Culture and society ==
Carmelites maintained cultural traits from rural Kentucky, notably in language, evidenced by words such as "hit" for it, "lamp oil" for kerosene, the hanging of "shuck beans", and the boiling of laundry in an "outdoor kettle". A documented practice of the group was the digging up of yellowroot and ginseng to sell to local stores. They were also said to hunt squirrels and groundhogs for income, including during the off-season. Most raised chickens, some kept pigs, and many kept garden patches for food. Some worked as tenant farmers, but others owned their own small tracts of farmland, occasionally enough for a corn harvest. However, many resided on unoccupied hill land instead.

Carmelites sometimes temporarily migrated for work, for instance to the Scioto onion marshes, or for railroad work. Some would winter in Magoffin County and return to Carmel later, living in the shacks of neighbors if theirs had been demolished during their absence. Census records in the 1900s reflect a trend of majority in-marriage.

== See also ==
- Alabama Cajans
- Beaver Creek Indian Tribe
- Brandywine people
- Melungeons
- Brass Ankles
  - Wassamasaw Tribe of Varnertown Indians
- Chestnut Ridge people
- Delaware Moors
- Dominickers
- Gibson family (Virginia)
- Haliwa-Saponi
- John Graweere
- Lumbee
- Margaret Cornish
- Microhistory
- One-place study
- Redbones
- Tidewater Creoles
