= Eastern United States =

Geographic region

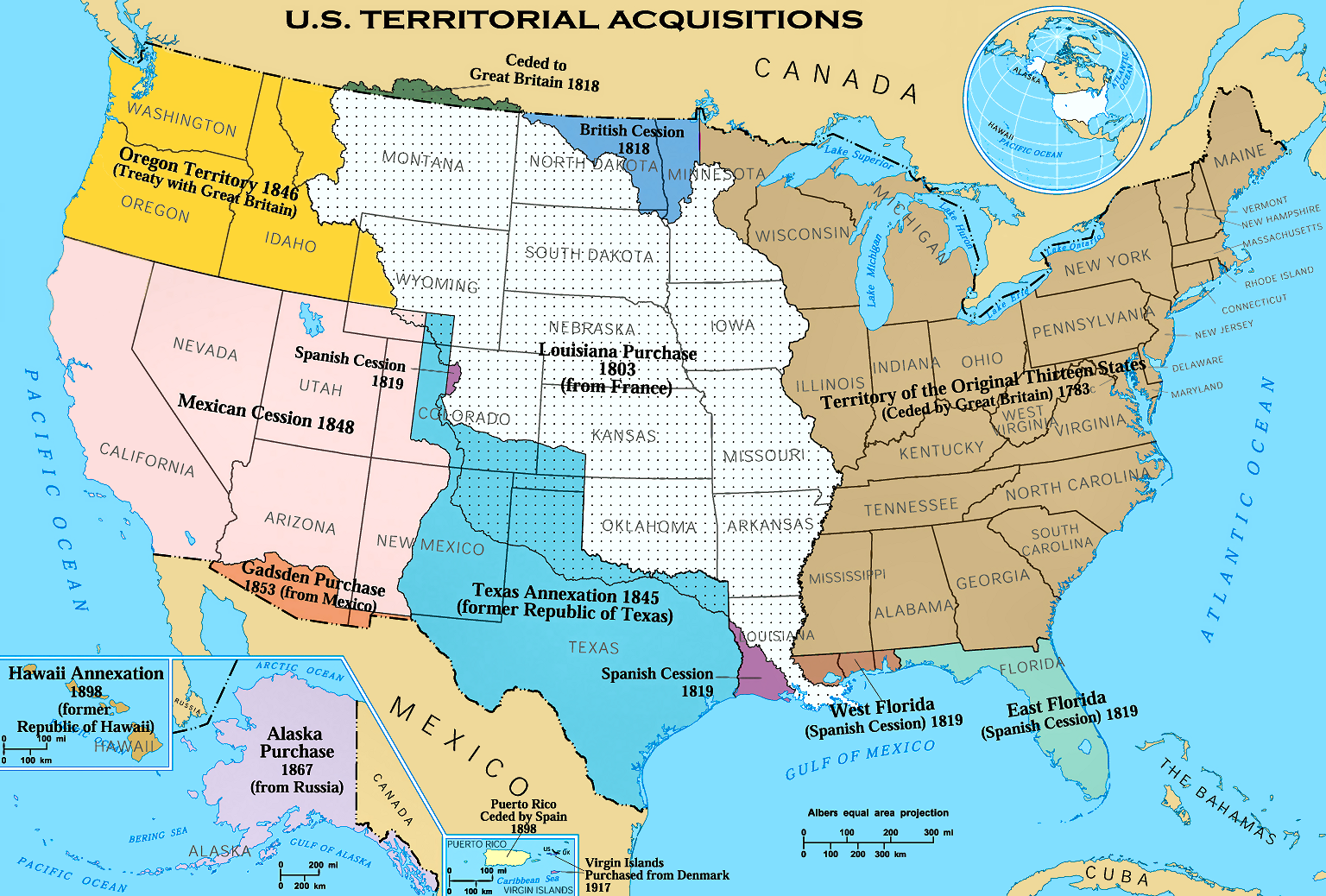
The area ceded to the United States in 1783 by Great Britain (in light brown) following the victory of George Washington and the Continental Army in the Revolutionary War is recognized as the Eastern United States.

A video of the Eastern United States taken by the crew of Expedition 29 from the International Space Station as it passed over the region

The Eastern United States, often abbreviated as simply the American East or the East, is a macroregion of the United States located to the east of the Mississippi River. It includes 26 states and Washington, D.C., the national capital.

As of 2011, the Eastern United States had an estimated population exceeding 179 million, representing the majority (over 58 percent) of the total U.S. population.

The three most populous cities in the Eastern United States are New York City, Chicago, and Philadelphia.

== Northeastern United States ==
According to the U.S. Census Bureau, the Northeastern United States comprises nine states, including (north to south): Maine, New Hampshire, Vermont, Massachusetts, Rhode Island, Connecticut, New Jersey, New York, and Pennsylvania.

The present-day Northeast is significantly smaller than the Northeastern Woodlands cultural area. The pre-Columbian Northeast had three major areas: the Coastal area, Saint Lawrence Lowlands, and Great Lakes-Riverine zones. The Coastal area includes the Atlantic Provinces of Canada and the Atlantic seaboard of the United States south to North Carolina. The Saint Lawrence Lowlands area includes parts of Southern Ontario, upstate New York, much of the Saint Lawrence River area, and the Susquehanna Valley. The Great Lakes-Riverine area includes the remaining inland areas of the Northeast, which were home to Central Algonquian and Siouan speakers. The Great Lakes region is sometimes considered a distinct cultural area due to its large concentration of Native American tribes.

=== New England ===
New England is a subregion of the northeastern U.S. that is bounded by the Atlantic Ocean, Canada, and the state of New York. It includes six states: Maine, New Hampshire, Vermont, Massachusetts, Rhode Island, and Connecticut.

In one of the earliest British colonial settlements in the New World, Pilgrims from England first settled in New England in 1620 at Plymouth Colony in and around present-day Plymouth, Massachusetts. In the late 18th century, the New England colonies were among the first North American British colonies to support an escalation in the American Revolution against Britain, launching the Boston Tea Party on December 16, 1773, and later firing the first shots of the American Revolutionary War in the Battles of Lexington and Concord on April 19, 1775.

New England produced the first examples of American literature and philosophy and was home to the beginnings of free and compulsory public education. In the 19th century, the region played a prominent role in the movement to abolish slavery in the United States. It was the first region of the United States to be transformed by the Industrial Revolution.

As of 2023, New England is home to two of the top ten universities in the nation, according to 2022–23 U.S. News & World Report rankings, Harvard University in Cambridge, Massachusetts (tied for third), and Massachusetts Institute of Technology in Cambridge, Massachusetts (tied for third).

=== Mid-Atlantic ===
According to the United States Census Bureau, the Middle Atlantic is a subregion of the northeastern U.S. that includes three states: New Jersey, New York, and Pennsylvania.

The Middle Atlantic region includes New York City, the largest city in the U.S. and a global center of finance and culture, and Philadelphia, the nation's sixth-largest city and first capital, where the Declaration of Independence was signed at Independence Hall in 1776, formally launching the American Revolutionary War, and later where the U.S. Constitution was drafted and ratified at Independence Hall in Philadelphia in 1789.

As of 2026, the Mid-Atlantic region is home to five of the top twenty-five universities in the nation, according to the 2026 U.S. News & World Report rankings: Princeton University in Princeton, New Jersey, Cornell University in Ithaca, New York, Columbia University in New York City, the University of Pennsylvania in Philadelphia, and Carnegie Mellon University in Pittsburgh.

=== East North Central States ===
The East North Central area, which includes Illinois, Indiana, Michigan, Ohio, and Wisconsin, can also be classified as a subregion of the Northeastern United States, as these states are in the Great Lakes-Riverine area. As one of two subregional divisions used to categorize the modern Midwest, the East North Central region closely matches the area of the Northwest Territory, excluding a portion of Minnesota. The East North Central states form a large part of the Great Lakes region, although the latter also includes Minnesota, New York, Pennsylvania and the Canadian province of Ontario.

Culturally, the East North Central region of the U.S. has been historically influenced by the British and the French; Anglo-American culture permeated states covering the region following the westward expansion of the United States. Religiously, the East North Central states have been and remain predominantly affiliated with Christianity. Altogether, the five states are majority Catholic, non- and inter-denominational, Methodist, Lutheran, and Baptist. The largest non-Christian religion has been Islam.

Chicago is the largest city in the region, followed by Columbus, Ohio and Indianapolis. Chicago has the largest metropolitan statistical area, followed by Detroit. Sault Ste. Marie, Michigan is the oldest city in the region, founded by French missionaries and explorers in 1668.

As of 2026, the East North Central area is home to two of the top ten universities in the nation, according to the 2026 edition of Best Colleges by U.S. News & World Report: the University of Chicago, which is ranked the sixth-best in the nation, and Northwestern University, which is tied for seventh-best.

== Southeastern United States ==
The Southeastern United States is a large region of the country that includes a core of states that reaches north to Maryland and West Virginia, bordering the Ohio River and Mason–Dixon line, and stretches west to Arkansas and Louisiana. (Note: This includes Florida, Georgia, South Carolina, North Carolina, Virginia, Missouri, West Virginia, Maryland, Delaware, Washington, D.C., Kentucky, Tennessee, Mississippi, Alabama, Louisiana, and Arkansas.)

Unlike the Northeast, there is no official U.S. government definition for the Southeast, and it is defined variably among agencies and organizations.

Its unique cultural and historic heritage includes the following aspects:

- Distinct Native American cultures (Indigenous peoples of the Southeastern Woodlands)
- Early European settlements of English, Scotch-Irish, Scottish and German heritage
- Rejection of the Anglican Church as instituted by Great Britain and resorting to other denominations of Protestantism
- Helping partake in the American Revolutionary War
- Importation of hundreds of thousands of enslaved black Africans
- Growth of a large black population
- Reliance on slave labor from early 1600s to mid-1800s
- Southern yeoman farmers that differed from the planter class
- Legacy of the Confederacy after the Civil War
- Reconstruction Era
- Jim Crow era and Great Migration
- Civil rights movement
- Emergence of the New South and New Great Migration

These aspects, among other things, led to "the South" developing distinctive customs, literature, musical styles, and varied cuisines that have profoundly shaped traditional American culture.

The shift from a mainly rural society to more cities and urbanized metropolitan areas picked up speed following World War II in the 1940s. Since the late 20th century, certain Southeastern states and areas have seen great economic growth. This growth has led to many migrants moving to Southeastern states. In 2020, Fortune 500 companies headquartered in southeastern states included: Virginia with 22, Georgia with 18, Florida with 18, North Carolina with 13, and Tennessee with 10.

=== South Atlantic states ===
The South Atlantic region of the United States is one of the nine Census Bureau Divisions of the country. This region corresponds to the Southern states/areas that were geographically part of the Thirteen Colonies, with the addition of Florida. It includes eight states and one federal district: Delaware, Florida, Georgia, Maryland, North Carolina, South Carolina, Virginia, West Virginia and the District of Columbia. The South Atlantic is also a recognized geographical division used by the United States Geological Survey. All entities within the region apart from the District of Columbia and West Virginia border the Atlantic Ocean.

As of 2010, the South Atlantic states had a combined population of 61,774,970. The South Atlantic region covers 292,589 square miles (757,800 km^{2}). With the exception of West Virginia, the region has seen rapid population growth and economic development in recent decades.

As of 2026, the South Atlantic region is home to two of the top ten universities in the nation, according to the 2026 U.S. News & World Report rankings: Johns Hopkins University in Baltimore, Maryland, and Duke University in Durham, North Carolina.

=== East South Central States ===
The East South Central region constitutes one of the nine U.S. Census Bureau divisions. Four states make up the division: Kentucky, Tennessee, Mississippi and Alabama. Historically, the area has been colonized and influenced by the French, Spanish, British, early US, and Confederate governments. Distinct among these states, Alabama's French culture has been preserved through the Alabama Creoles, and Kentucky's French culture can be observed throughout Louisville. The East South Central states form the core of Old Dixie, one of the nine moral regions identified by James Patterson and Peter Kim in their acclaimed 1991 geopolitical best-seller, The Day America Told The Truth.

Politically and culturally, the East South Central is more conservative than the South Atlantic; Mississippi, Alabama, Kentucky, and Tennessee's governments have been described during 2012 to 2023 as some of the most conservative. Religiously, conservative Evangelical Protestantism dominates the East South Central region as a central part of the Bible Belt.

As of 2020, the East South Central states had a combined population of 19,430,030. The East South Central region covers 183,401 square miles of land. Within the region, Tennessee is the largest state by population, though Alabama is the largest by land area; Tennessee was also the East South Central's fastest growing state between 2010 and 2020, with Alabama second. Kentucky was the third-fastest growing state, and Mississippi experienced population decline; despite population decline, Mississippi did increase in diversity.

== Major population centers ==
The following is a list of the 25 largest cities in the Eastern United States, based on 2021 population estimates (within city limits, not metropolitan areas):

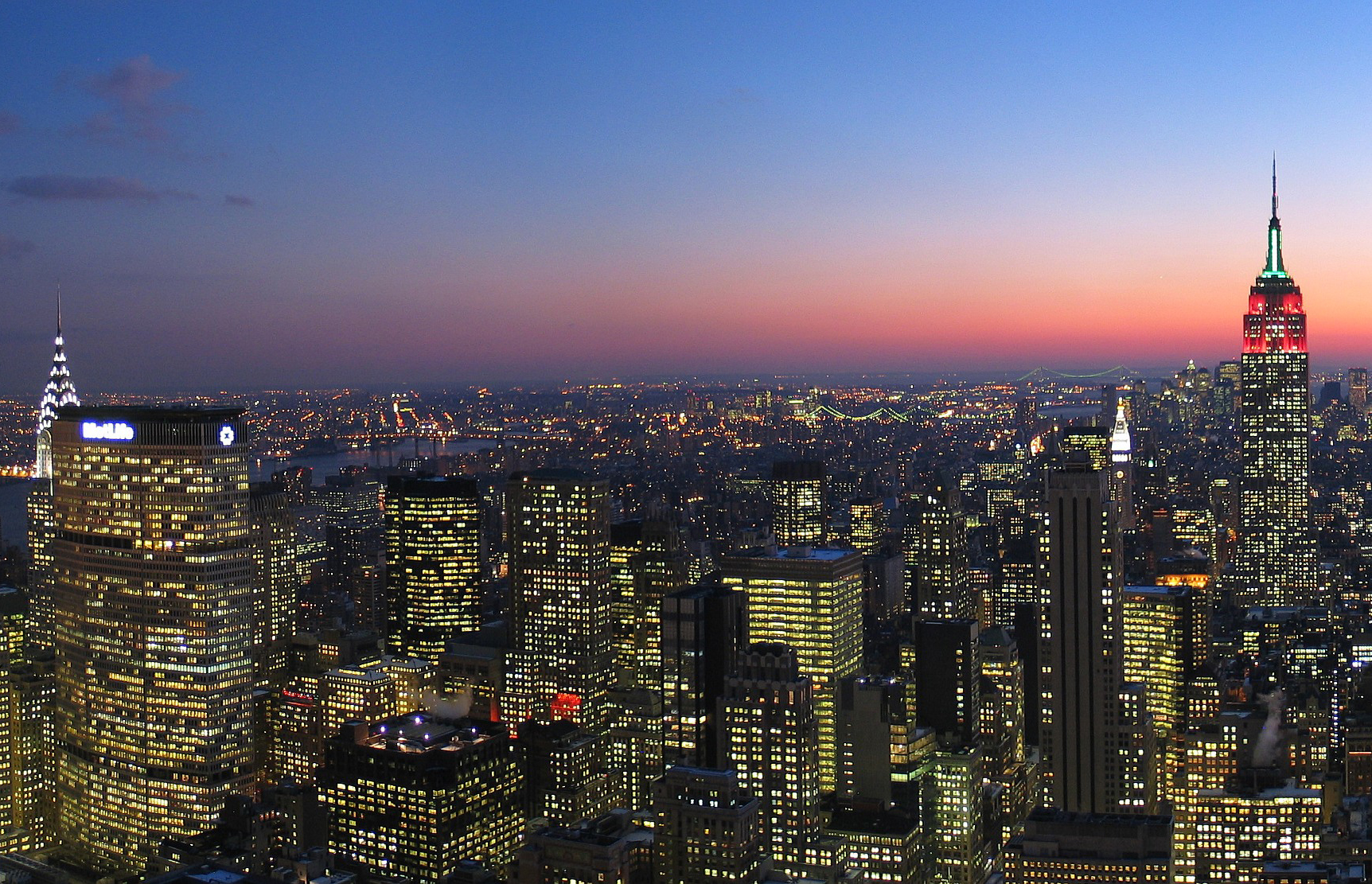
New York City
population: 8,230,290

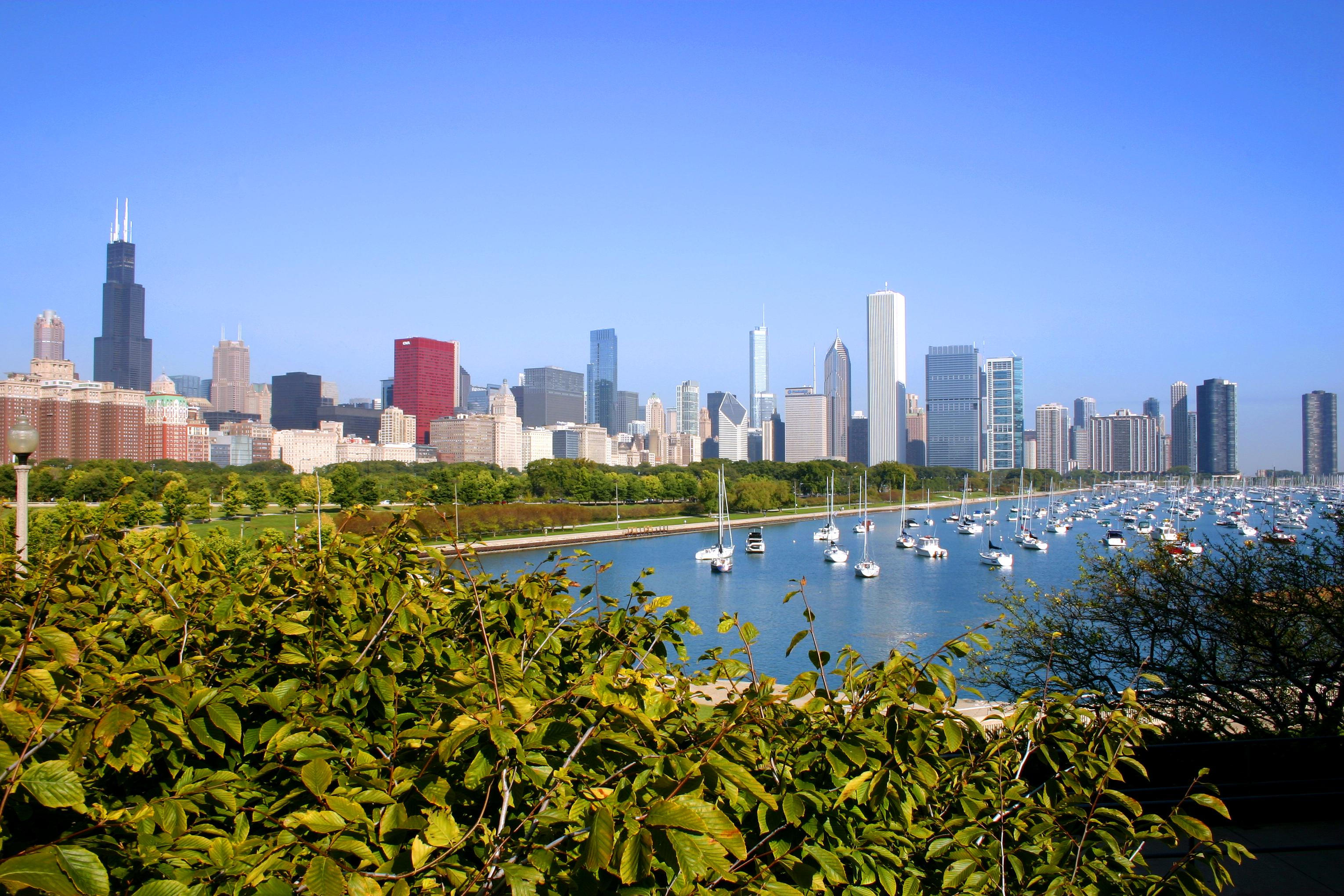
Chicago
population: 2,798,080

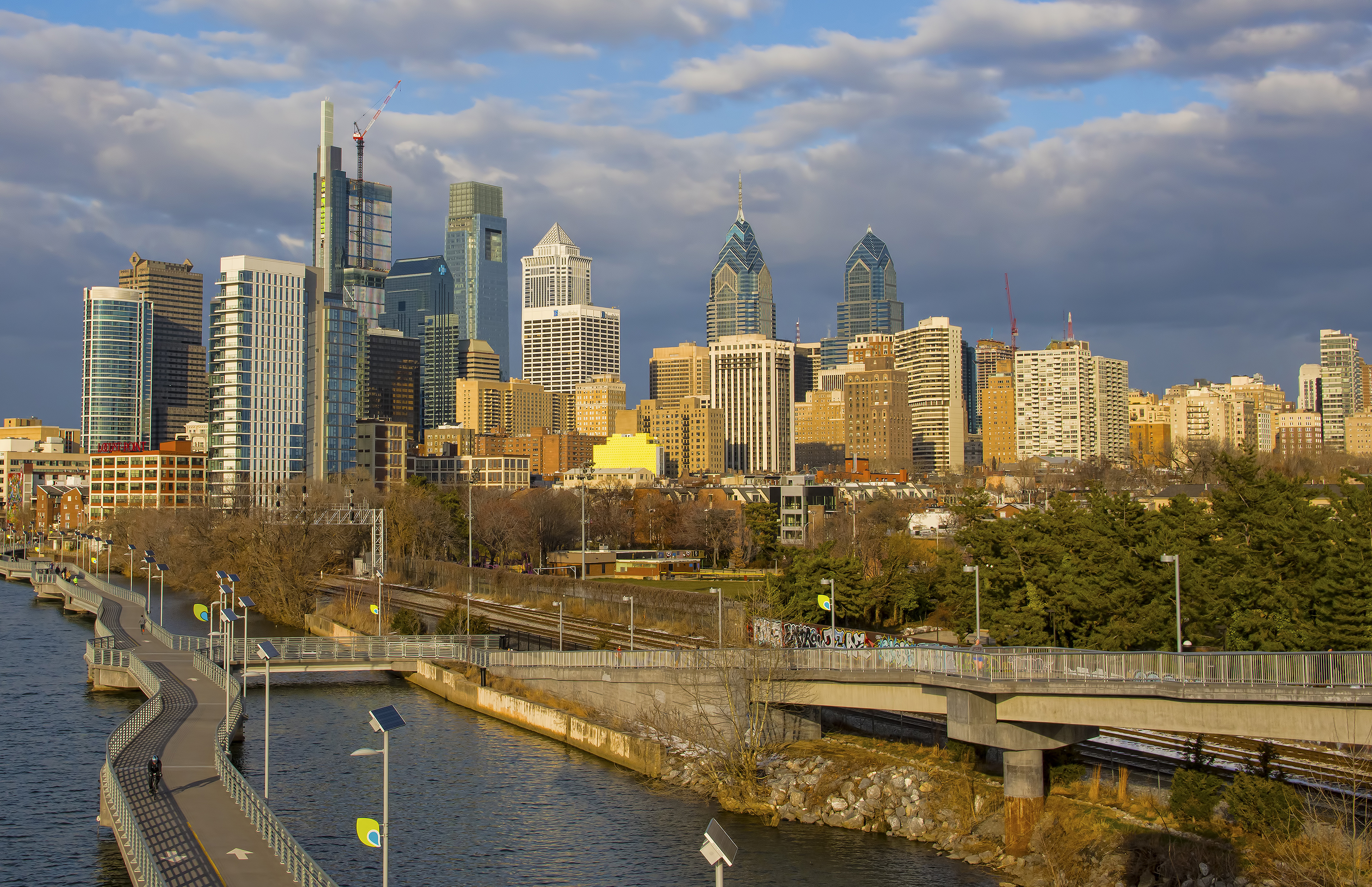
Philadelphia
population: 1,603,809

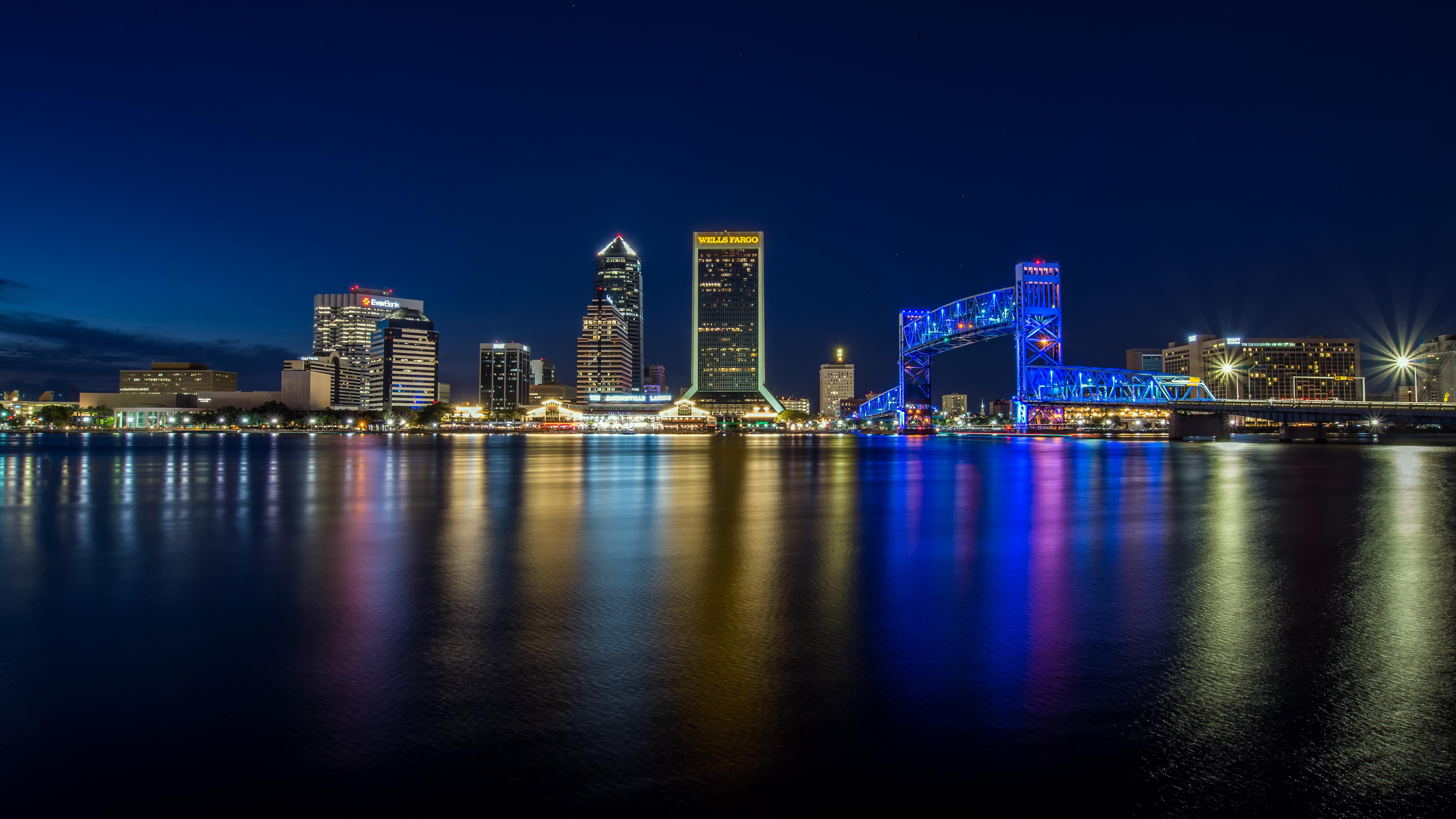
Jacksonville
population: 929,647

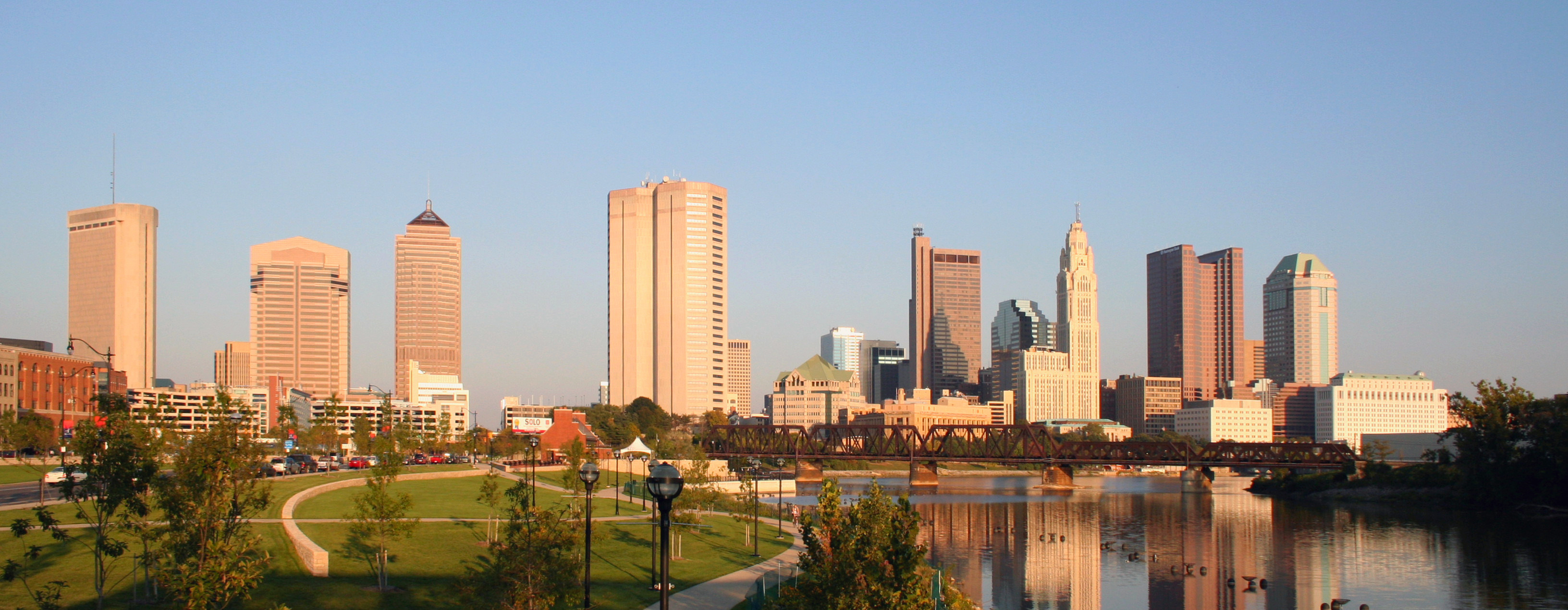
Columbus
population: 913,921

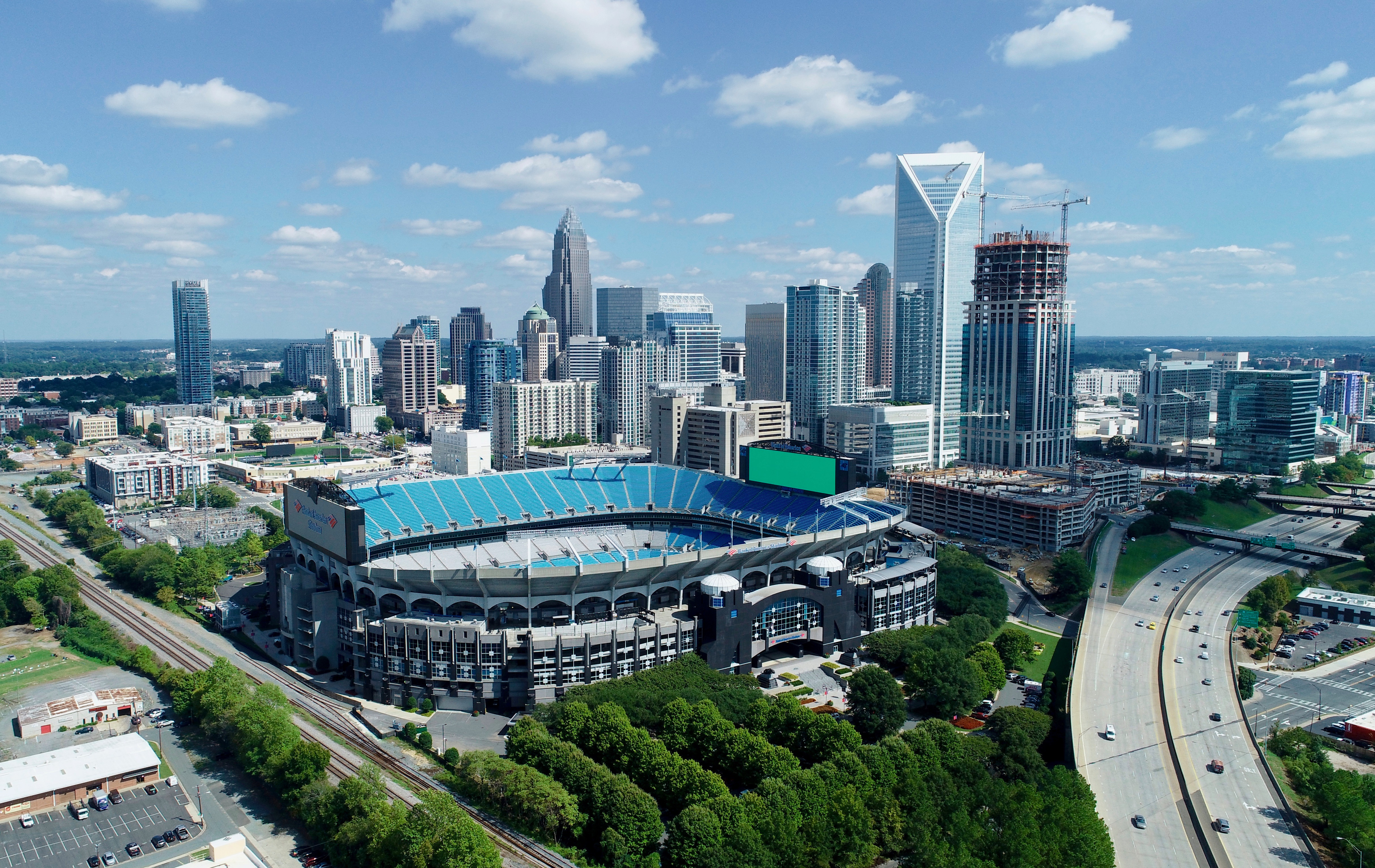
Charlotte
population: 912,096

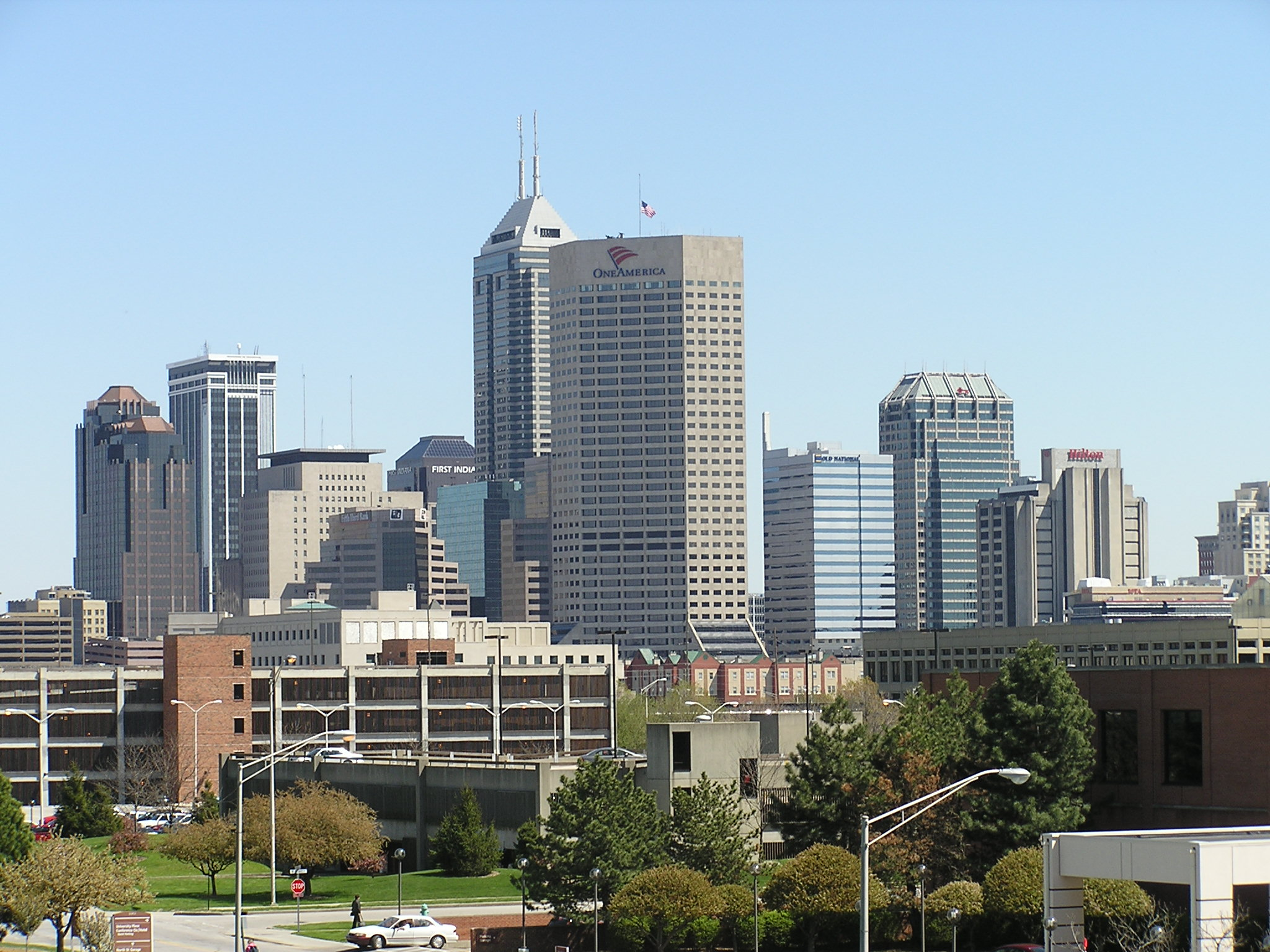
Indianapolis
population: 887,232

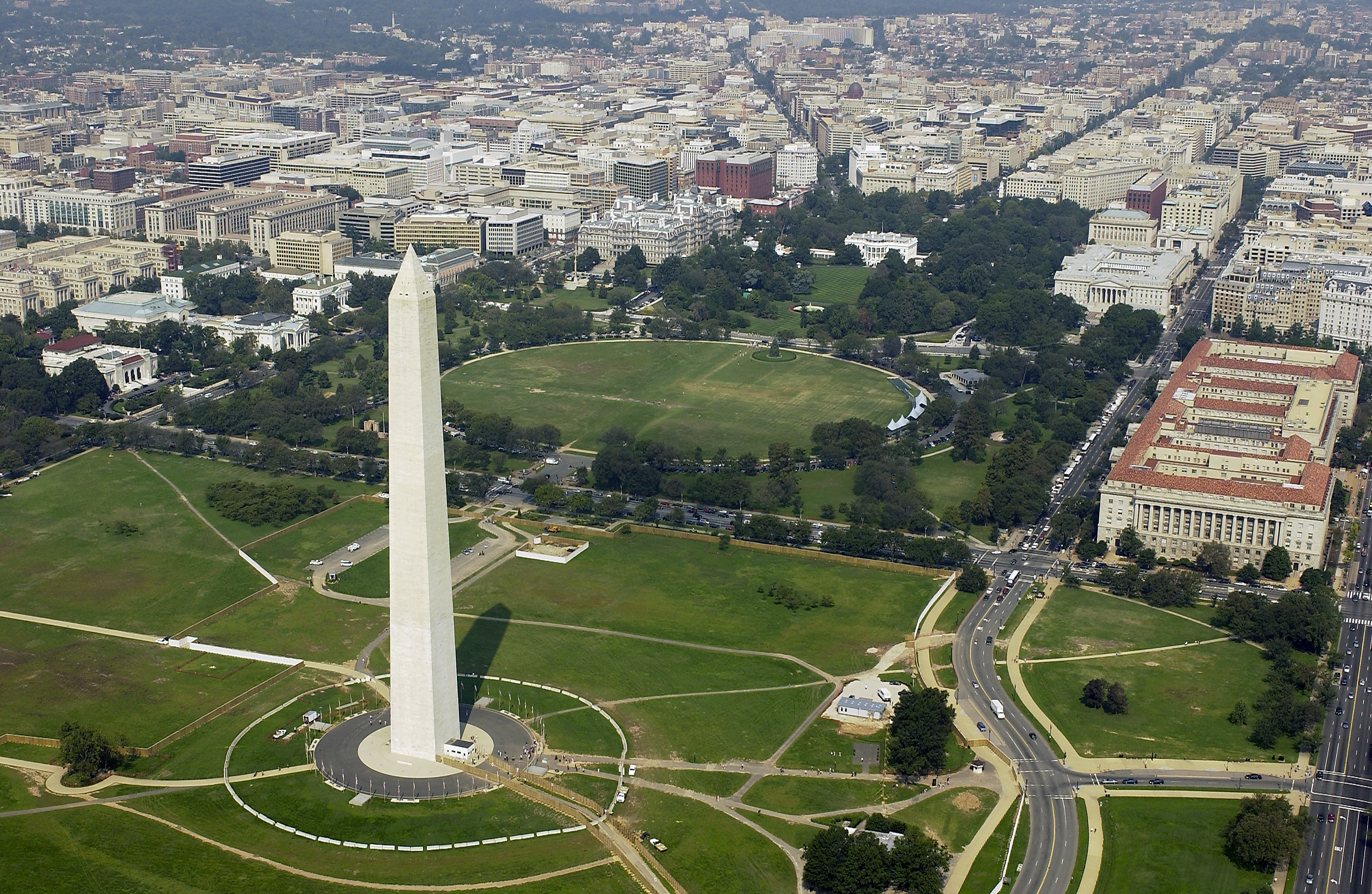
Washington, D.C.
population: 714,153

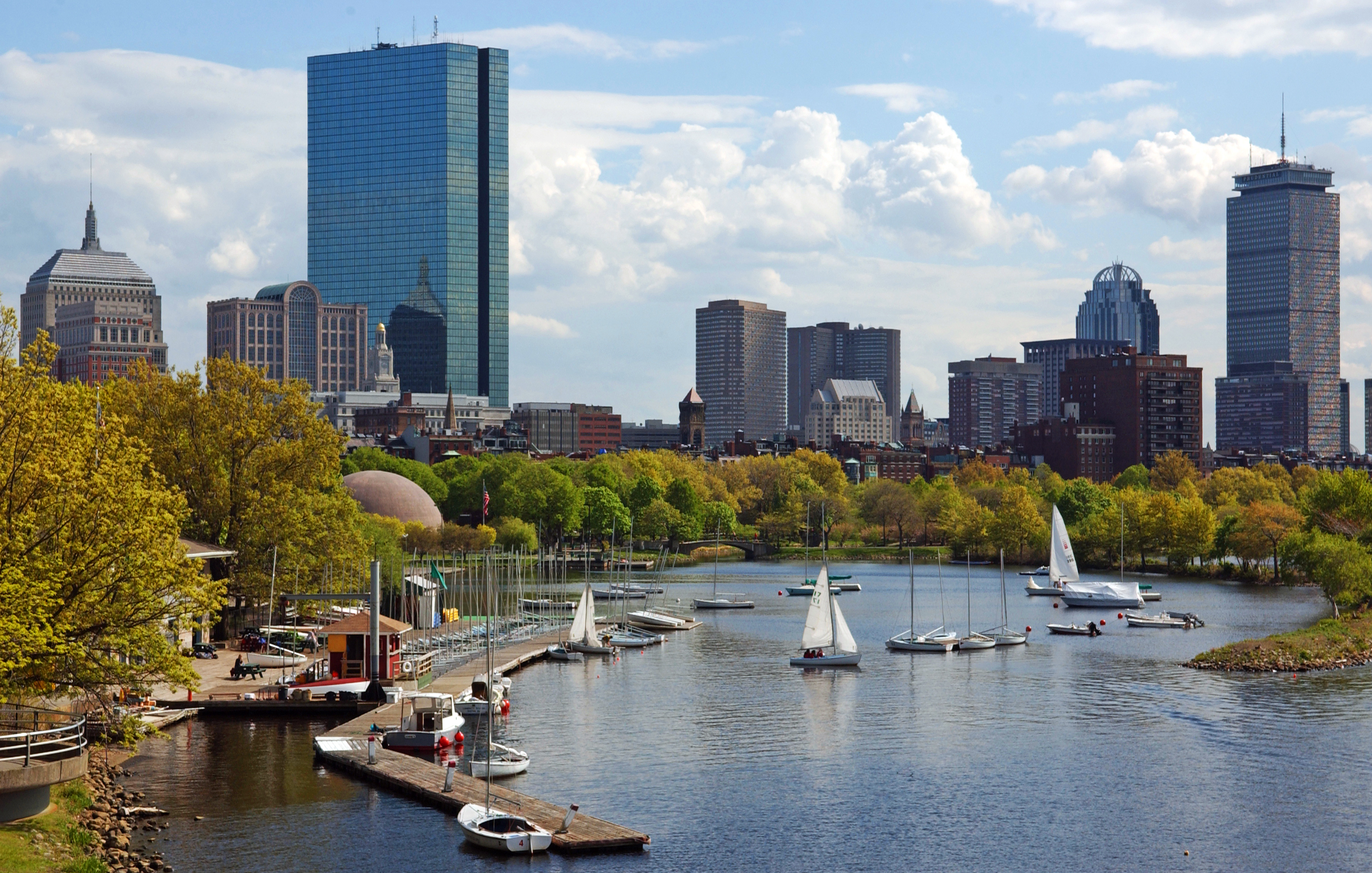
Boston
population: 695,506

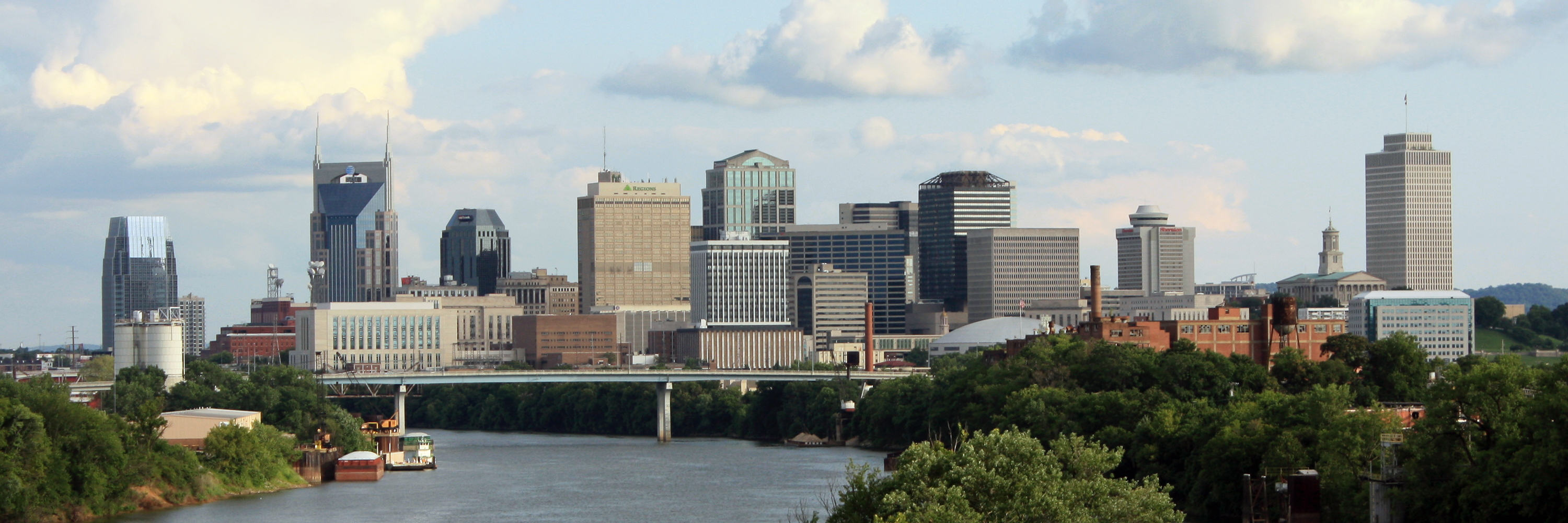
Nashville
population: 678,448

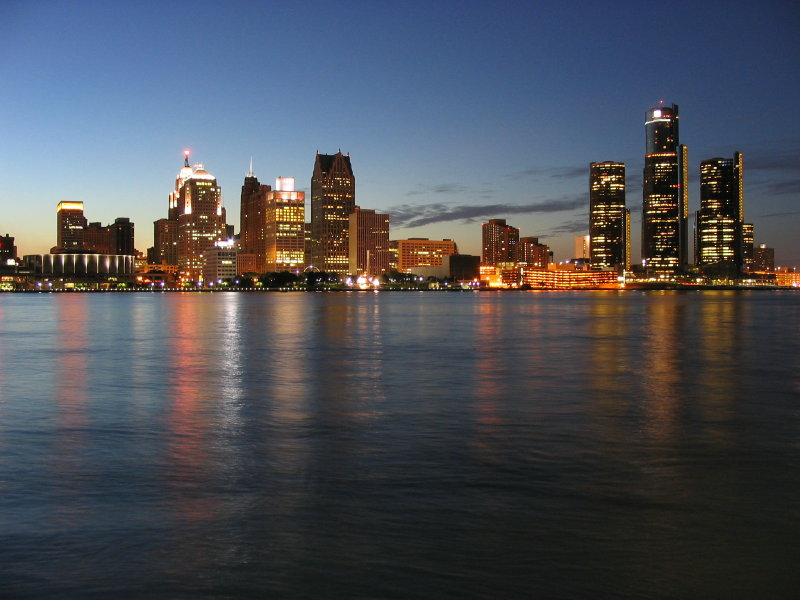
Detroit
population: 664,139

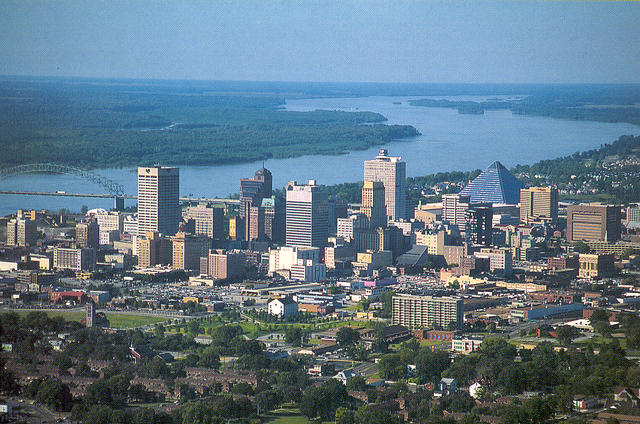
Memphis
population: 651,011

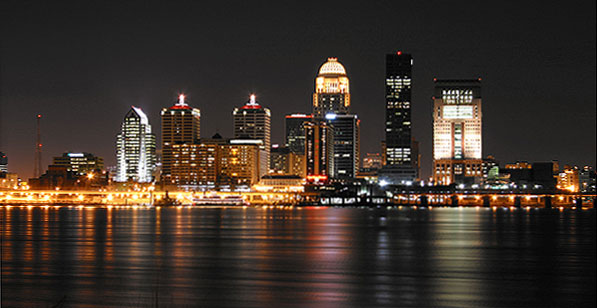
Louisville
population: 615,924

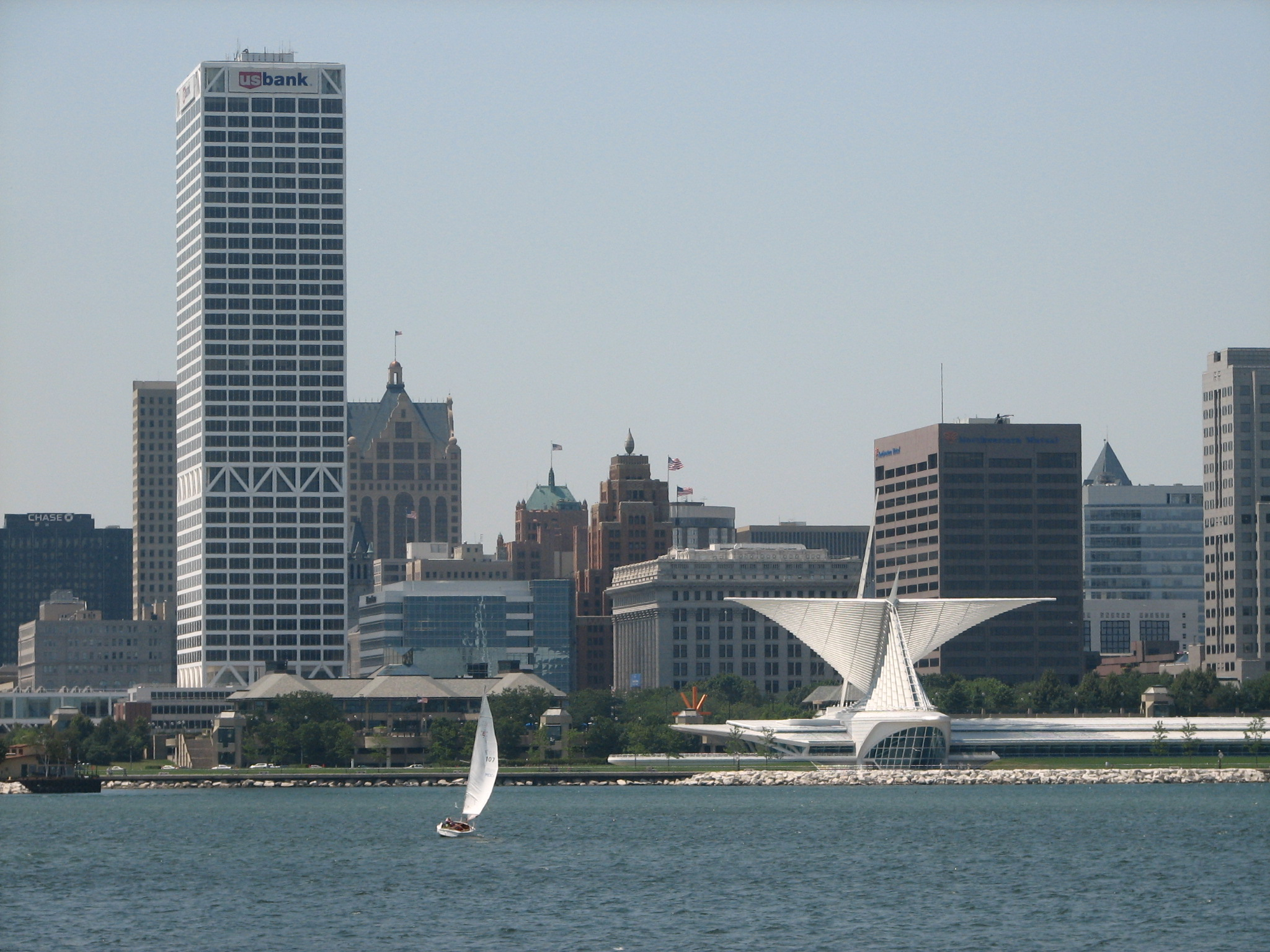
Milwaukee
population: 587,721

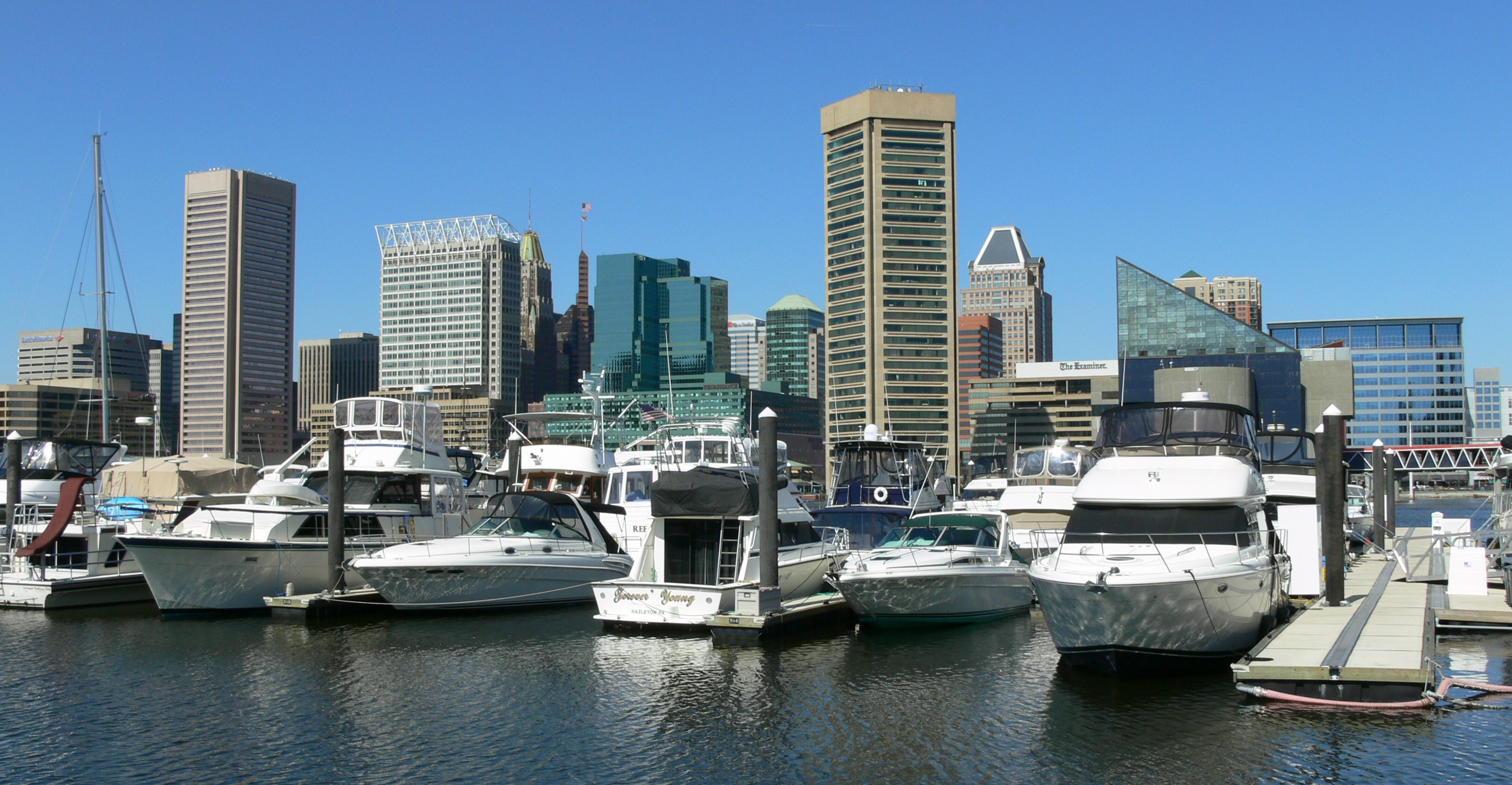
Baltimore
population: 575,584

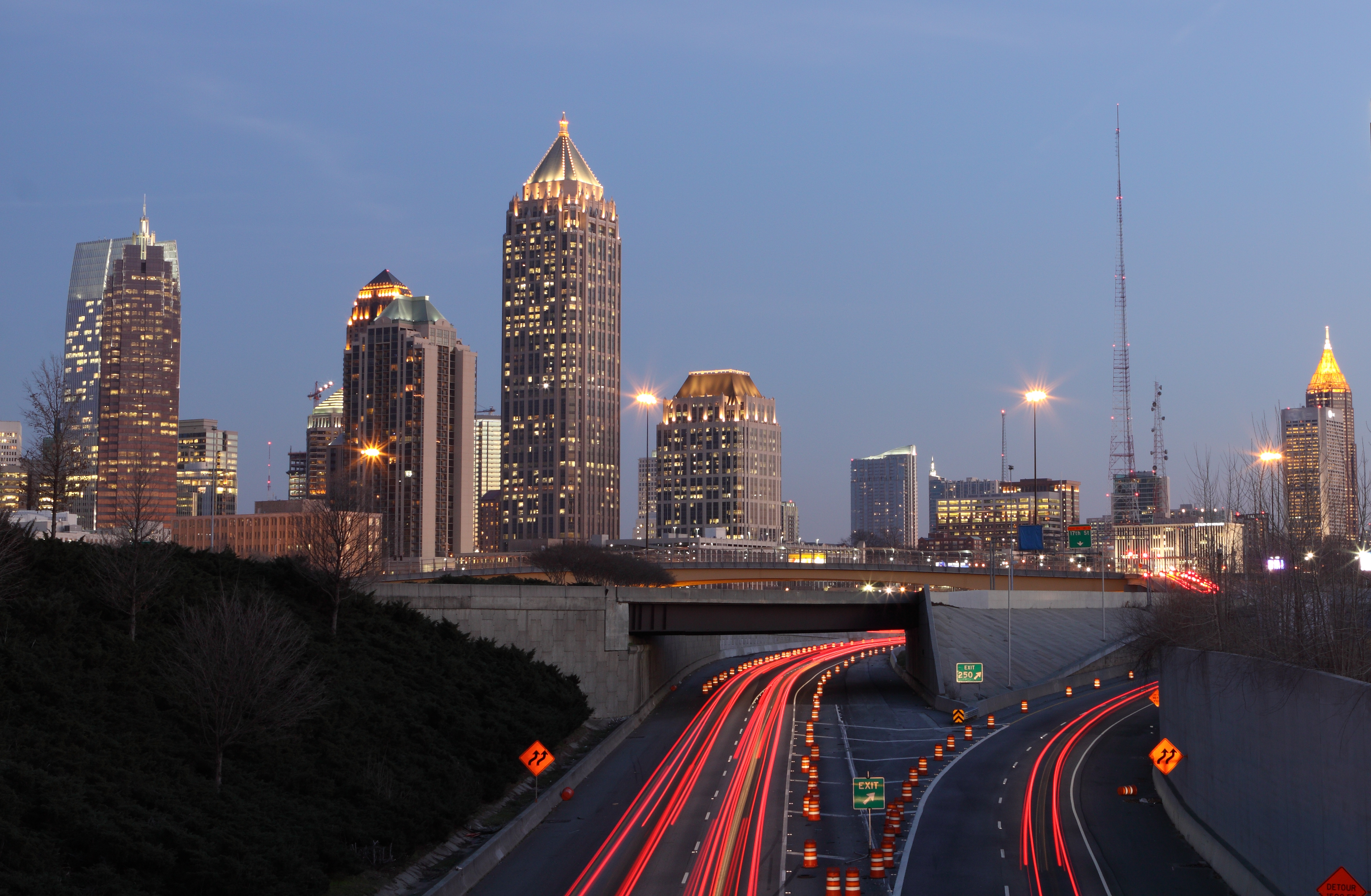
Atlanta
population: 524,067

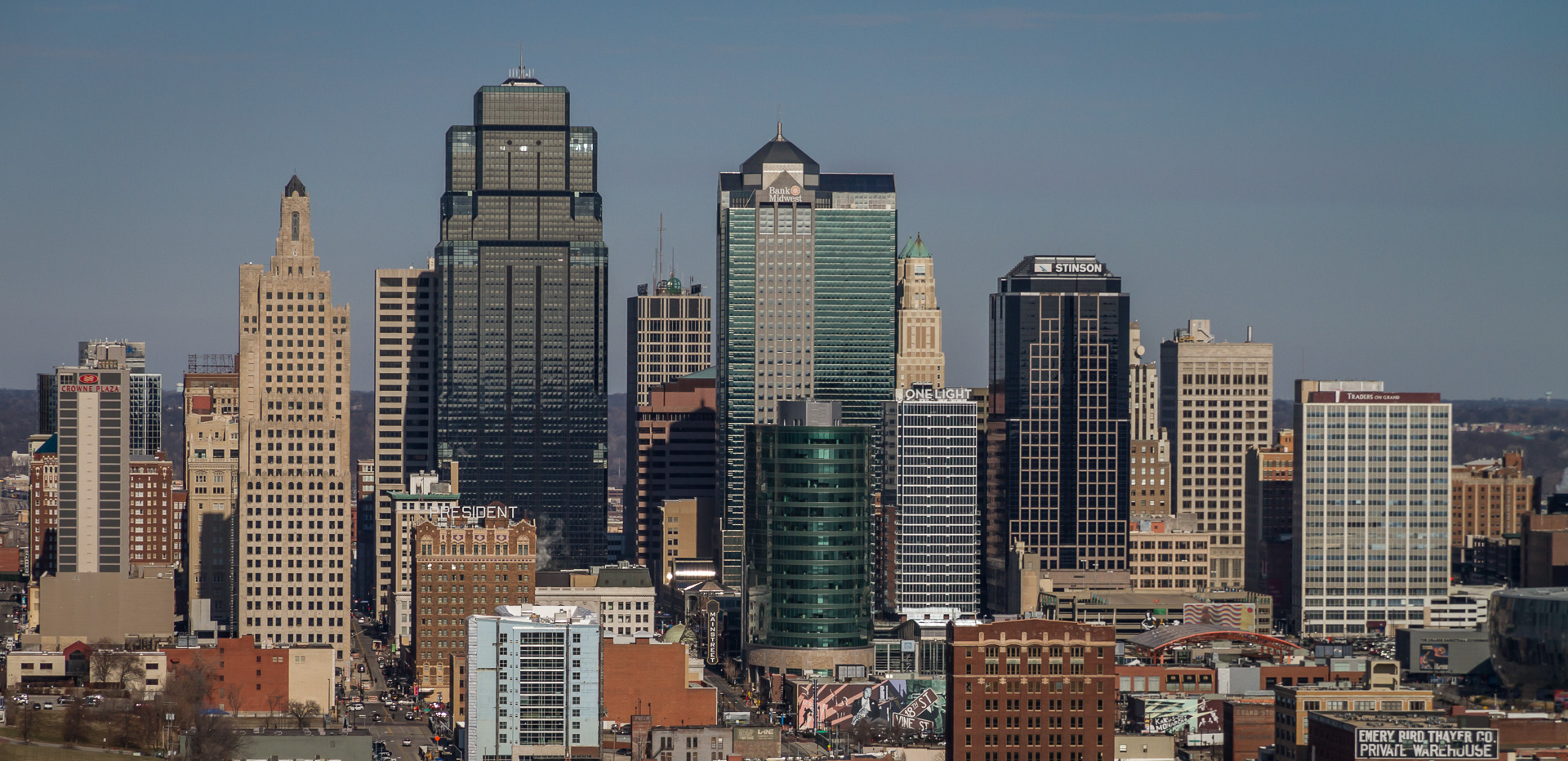
Kansas City
population: 508,090

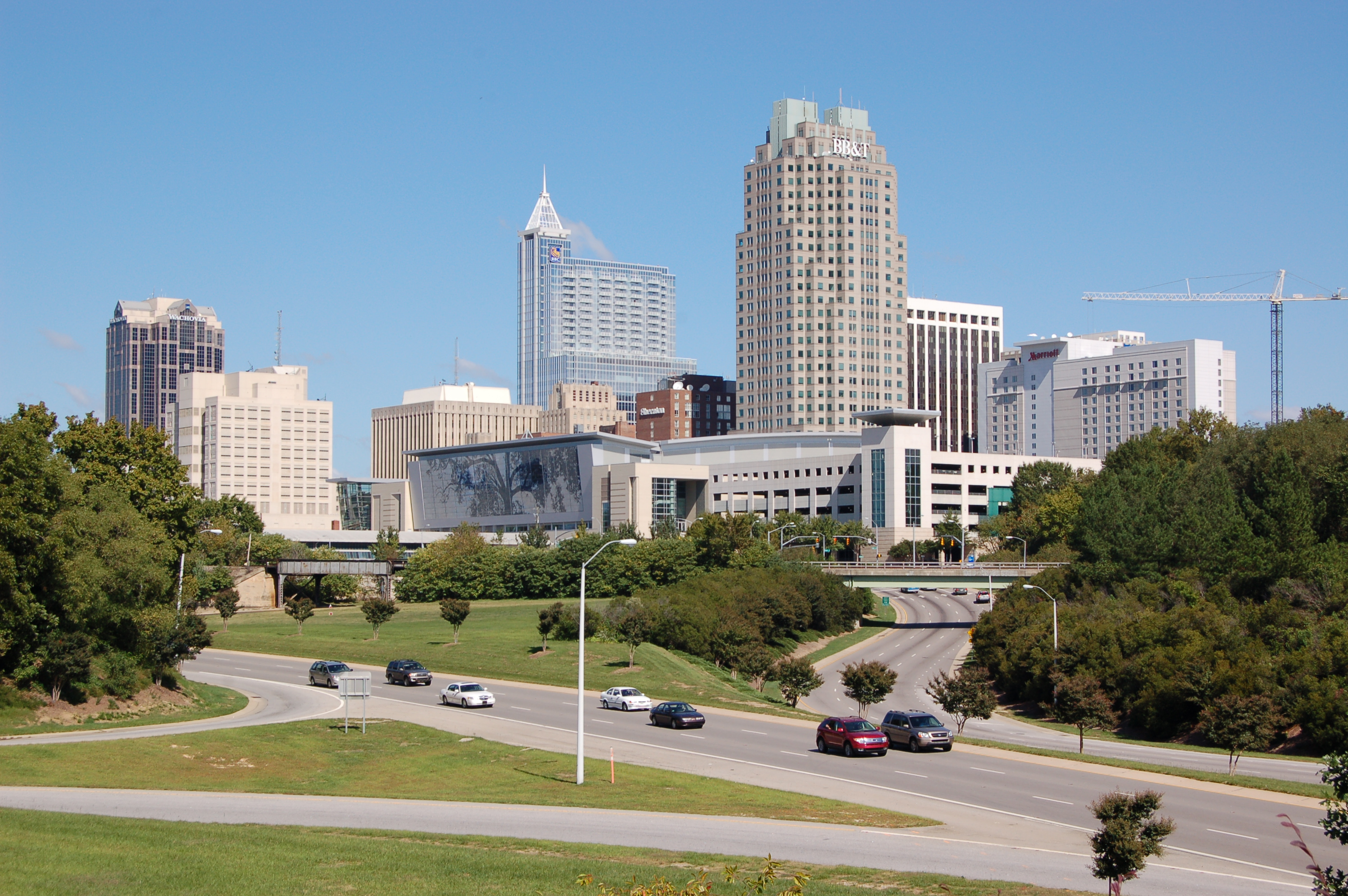
Raleigh
population: 483,579

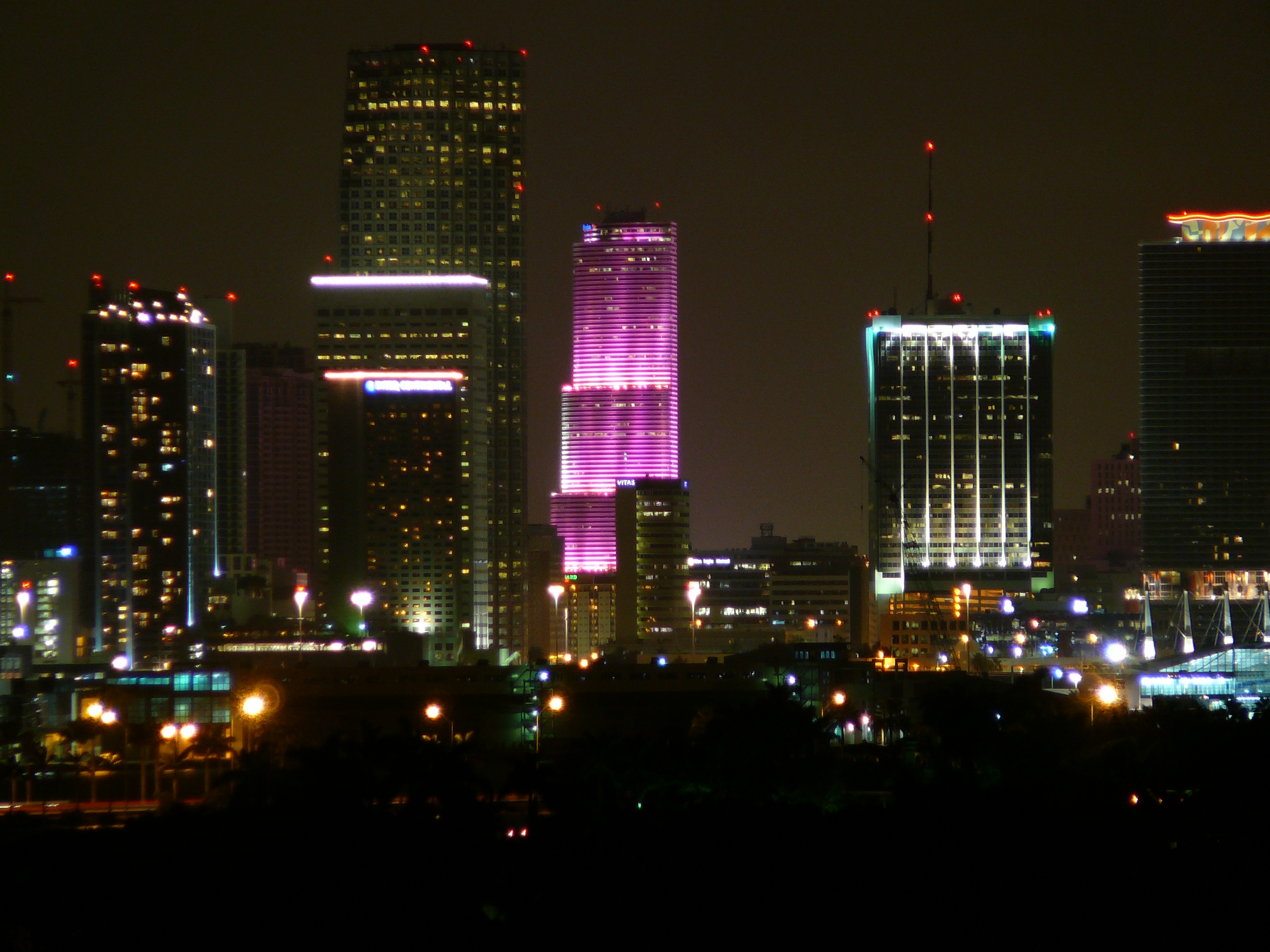
Miami
population: 478,251

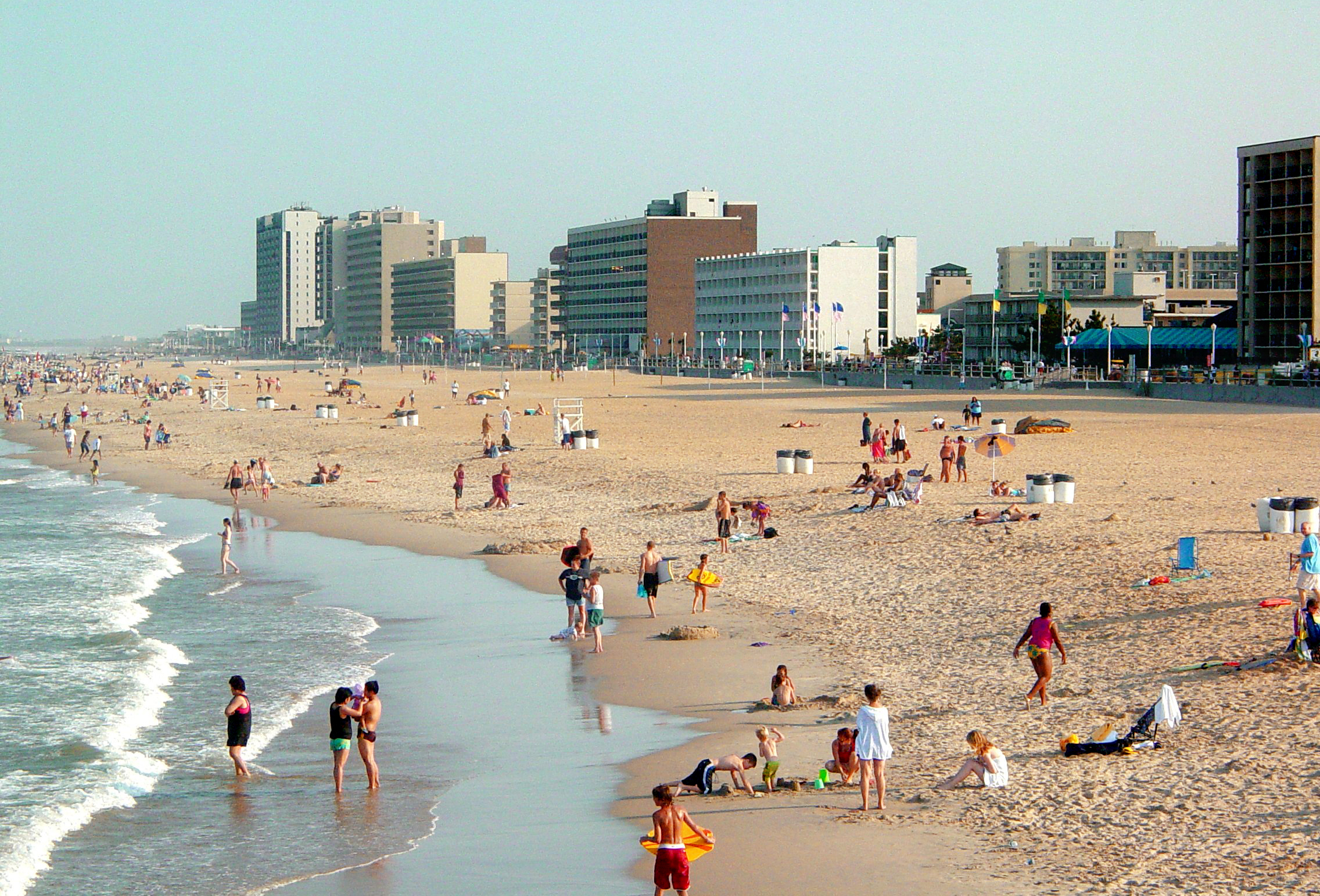
Virginia Beach
population: 450,224

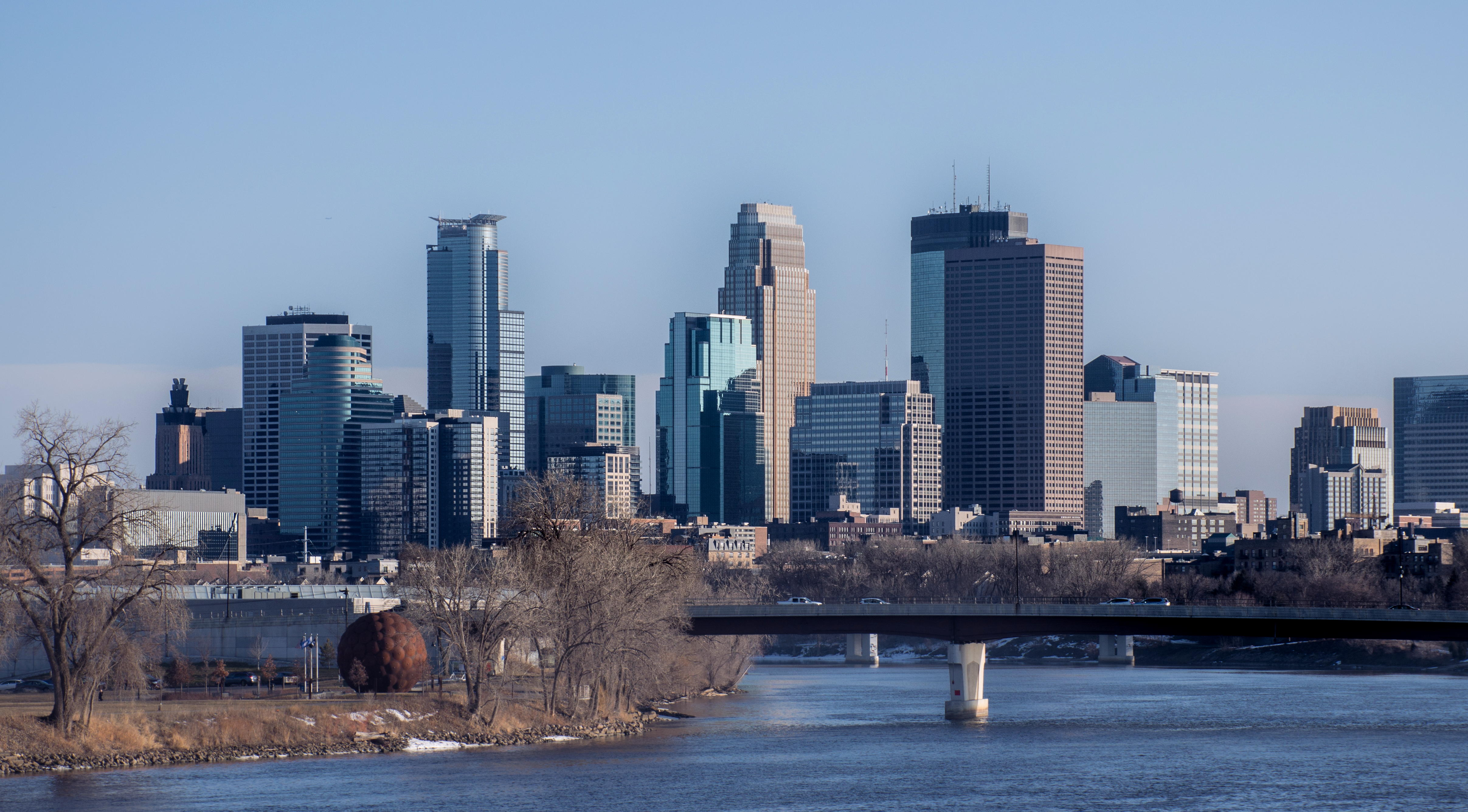
Minneapolis
population: 429,954

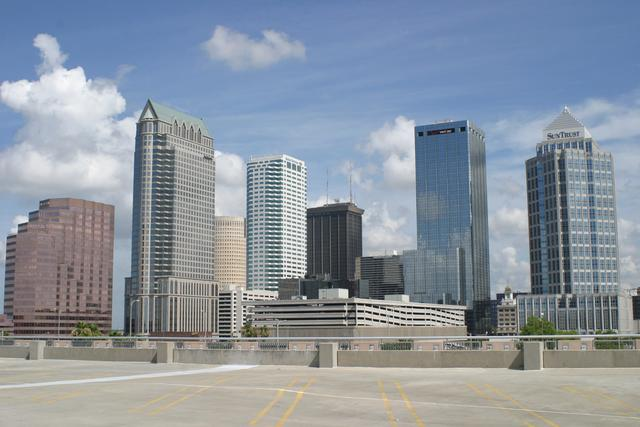
Tampa
population: 404,636

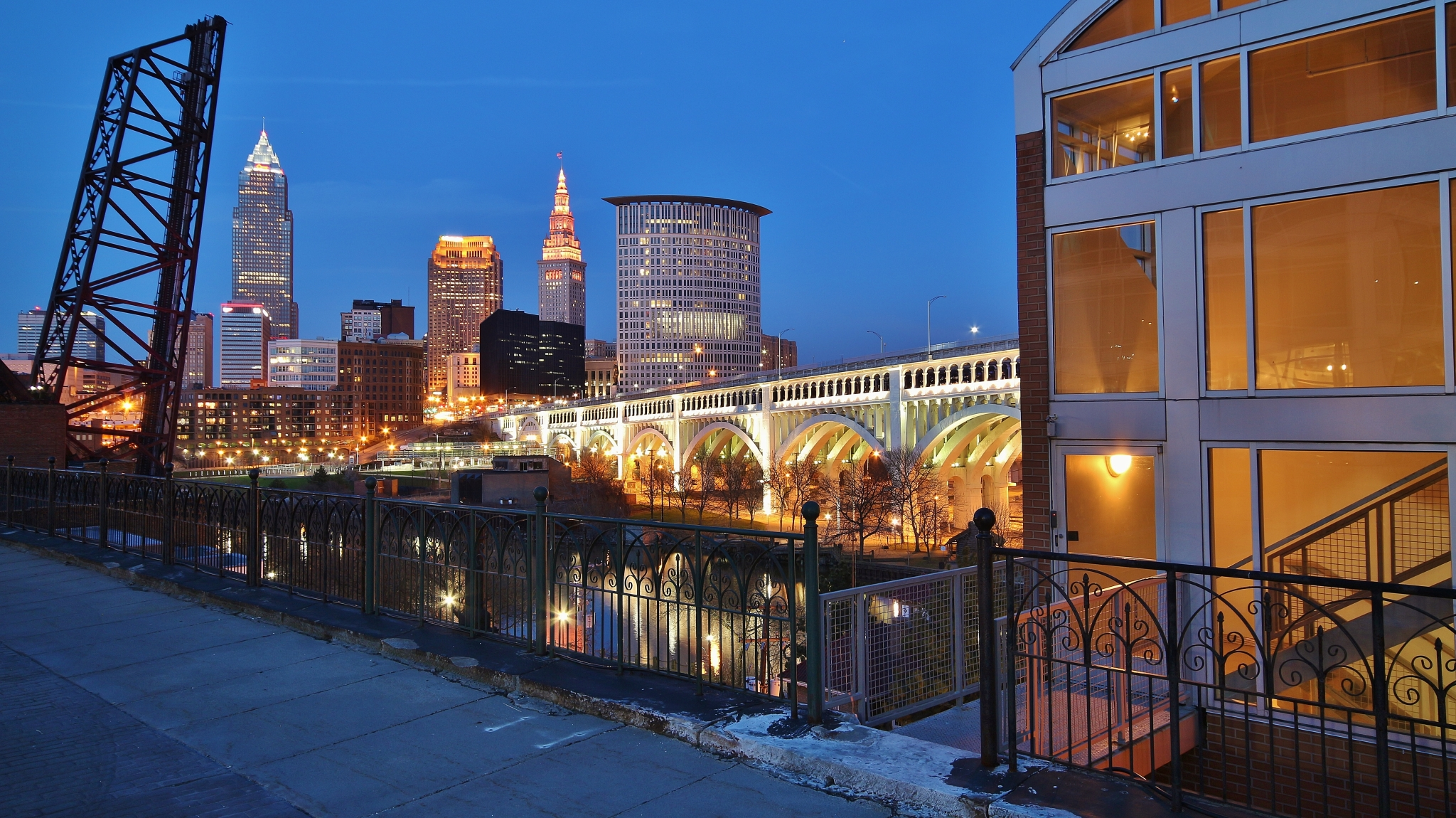
Cleveland
population: 376,599

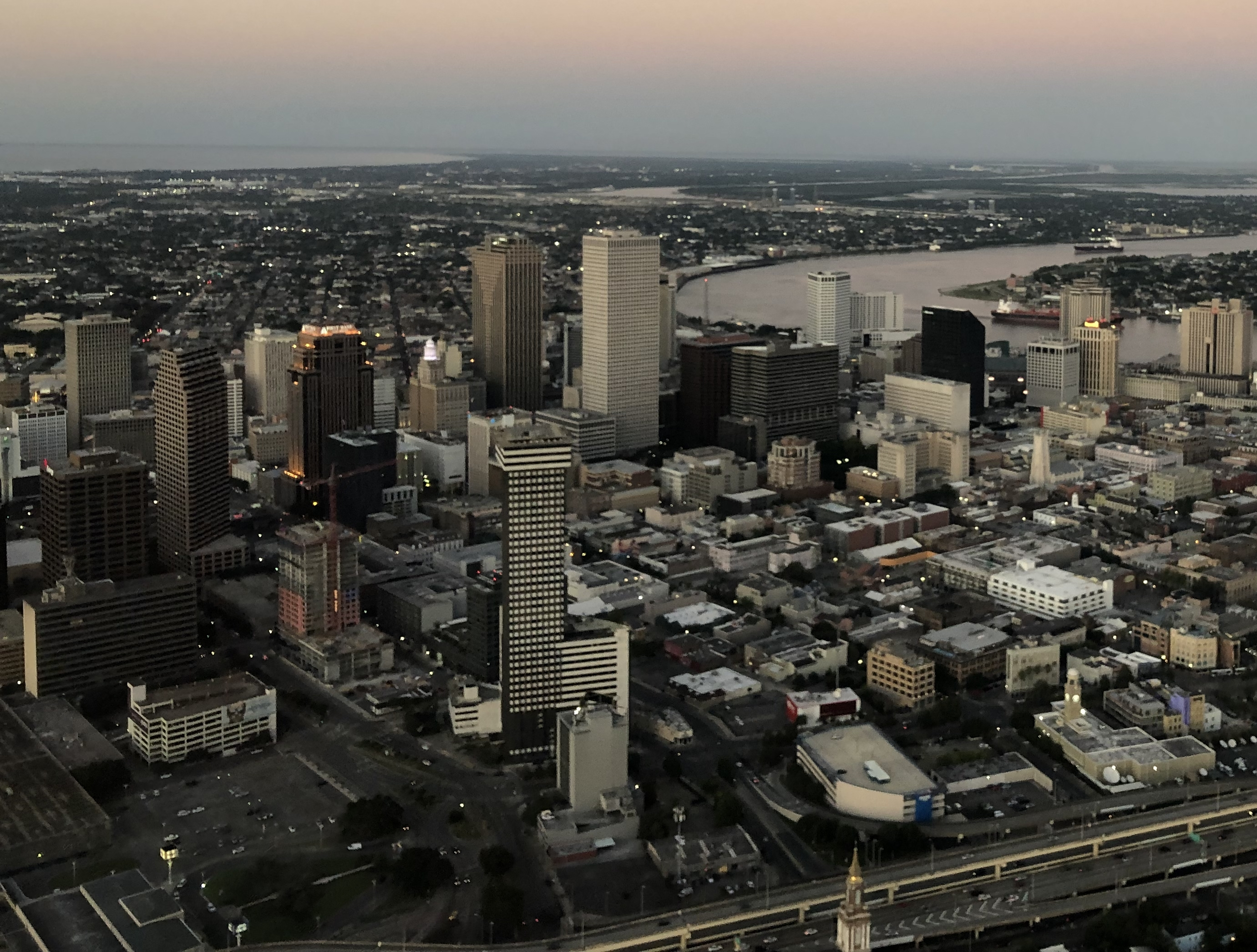
New Orleans
population: 362,701

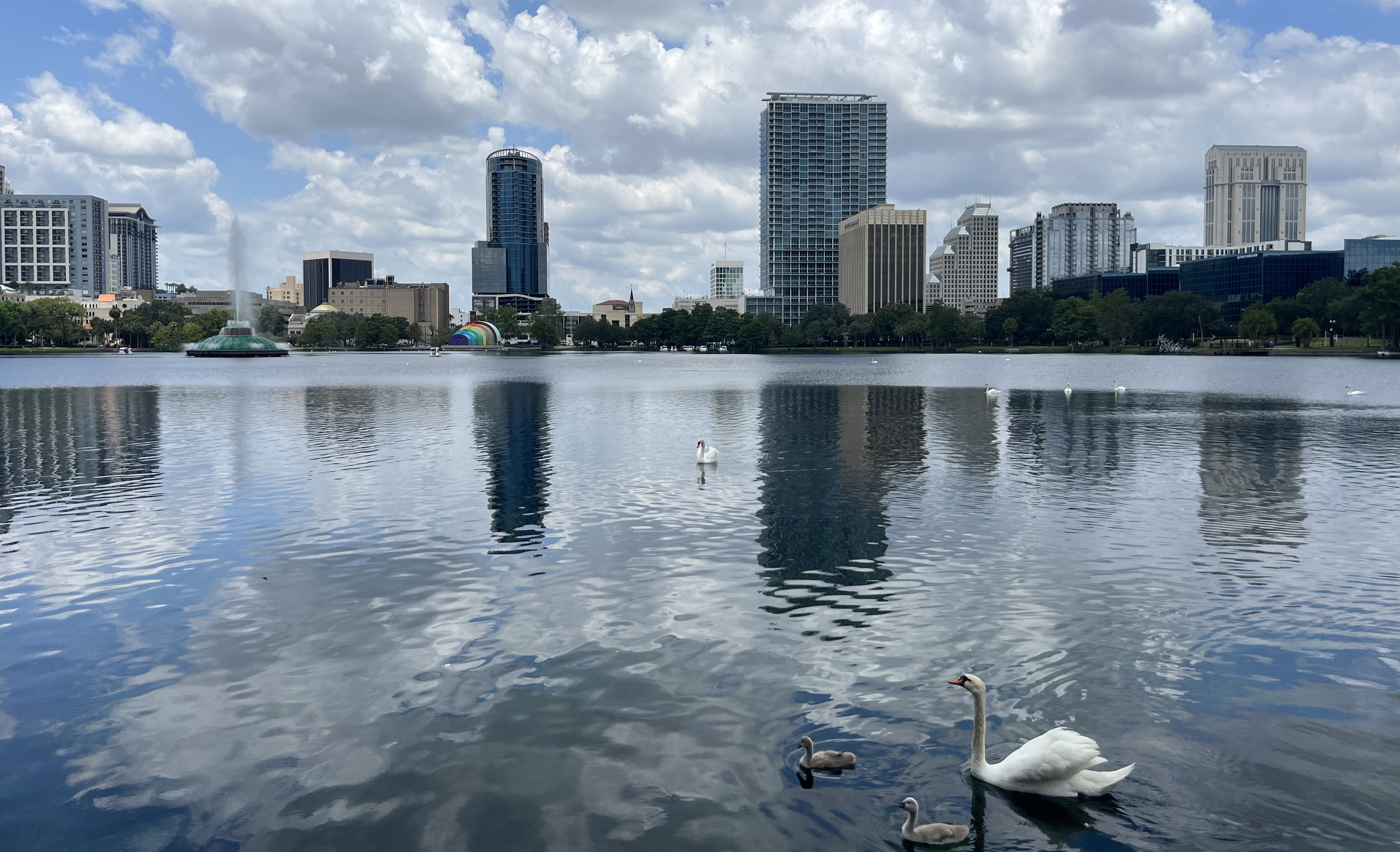
Orlando
population: 334,854

== See also ==
- List of online encyclopedias of U.S. states
- East Coast of the United States
