= African Americans in Alabama =

Ethnic group in Alabama

- Map of municipalities in Alabama with an African-American majority, 2020 census.

Total population
- 1,288,159 (2020)

Regions with significant populations
- Bullock County, Dallas County, Greene County, Hale County, Lowndes County, Macon County, Marengo County, Montgomery County, Perry County, Sumter County, and Wilcox County.

Languages
- Southern American English, African American English, African American Vernacular English

Religion
- Historically Black Protestant

Related ethnic groups
- Black Southerners, Alabama Creole people

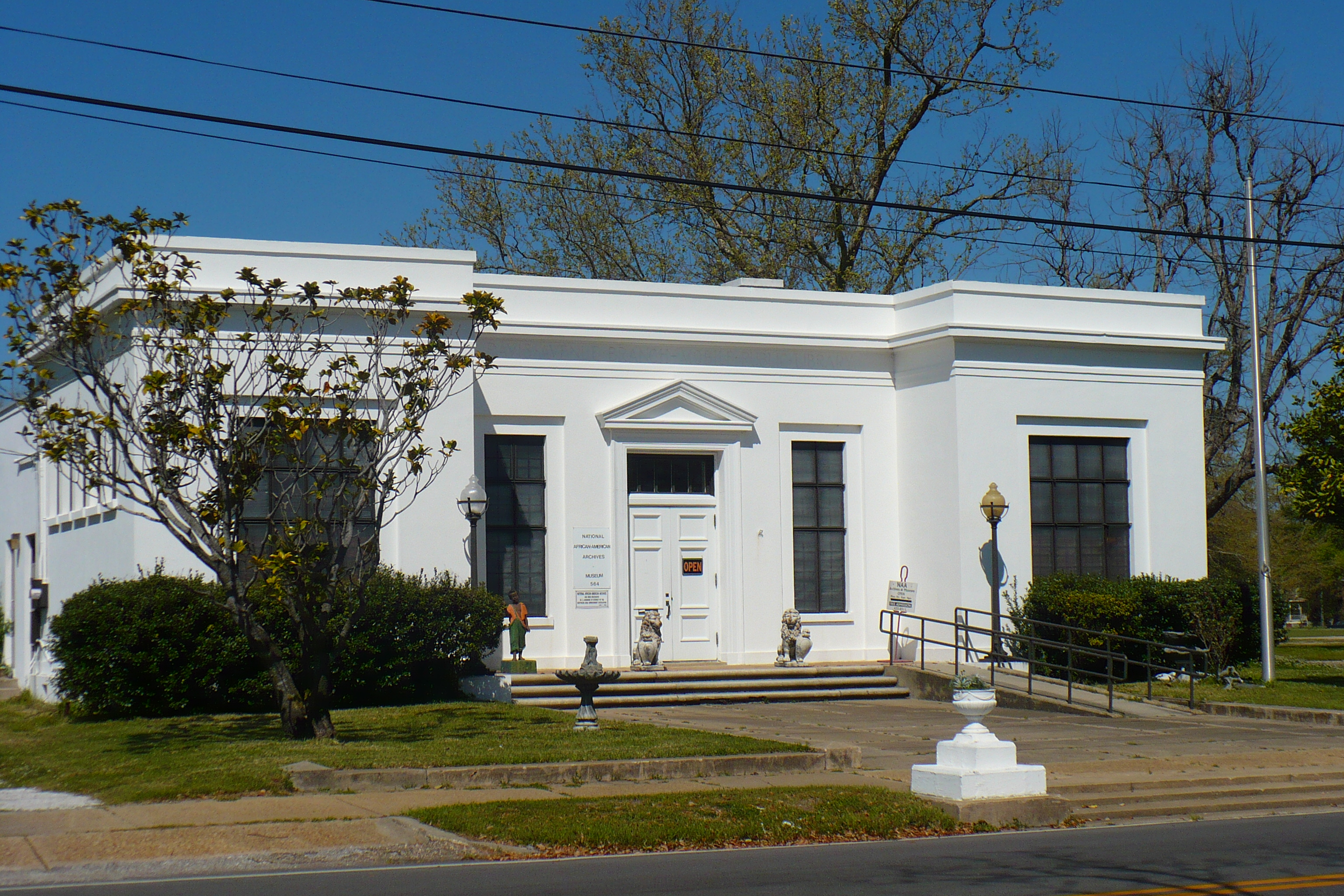
National African American Archives and Museum in Mobile

African Americans in Alabama or Black Alabamians are residents of the state of Alabama who are of African American ancestry. They have a history in Alabama from the era from before statehood through the American Civil War, the emancipation, the Reconstruction era, a resurgence of white supremacy with the Ku Klux Klan and Jim Crow laws, the Civil Right movement, and into recent decades. According to the 2020 Census, approximately 25.8% of Alabama's population is African American.

In the 2020 Census, 1,296,162 Alabama residents were identified as African American (of the total 5,024,279). In 11 of the state's 67 counties, African Americans make up more than 50% of the population: Greene (80.8%), Macon (79.1%), Sumter (72.9%), Bullock (71.4%), Wilcox (70.6%), Dallas (69.9%), Lowndes (69.8%), Perry (69.7%), Montgomery (57.0%), Hale (56.4%), and Marengo (52.7%). African Americans in the ten counties of Jefferson (281,326), Mobile (146,254), Montgomery (130,467), Madison (92,066), Tuscaloosa (69,088), Lee (39,570), Shelby (28,939), Houston (28,408), Dallas (26,899), and Talladega (26,439) make up more than 67% of all African Americans in the state.

== History ==
Slave quarter in Tuscumbia, Alabama.

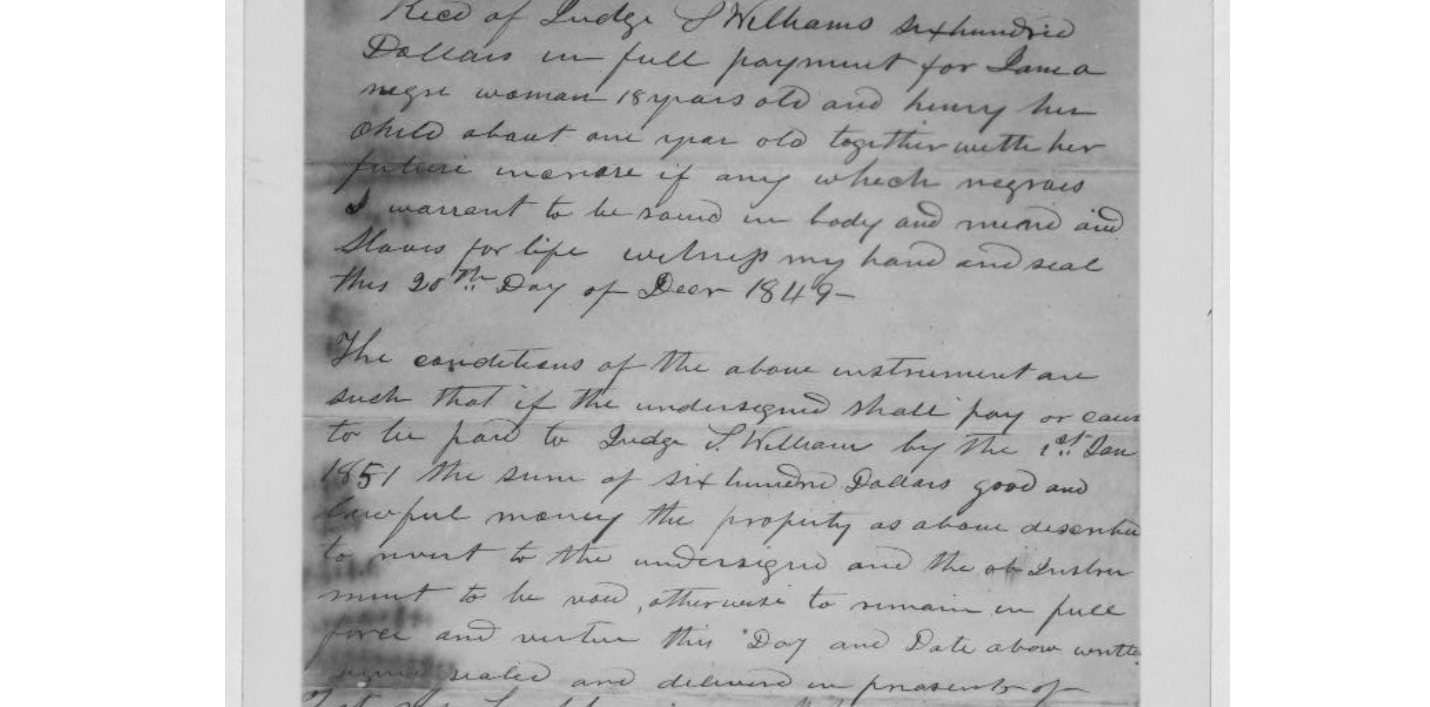
Receipt for the sale of black slaves in Eufaula, Alabama.

African Americans are Americans of African descent. People of African descent first arrived in Alabama as a part of the Spanish conquest of La Florida (which included Alabama) in the 16th century. The first documented Africans in Alabama arrived with Hernando de Soto. After the Spanish San Franciscans arrived in St. Augustine, Florida in 1573, they started moving northward and eastward into the Alabama area. The majority of African slaves were brought to Alabama during the slave trade, and some existed in Alabama even before it became a state in 1819.

In 1814, African Americans from Alabama fought alongside Creek Indians at the "Battle of Enchanachaca" in Alabama where U.S. military officers described them as their “most desperate foe”.

In 1860 the last documented slave ship the Clotilda arrived in Mobile Bay, Alabama, with 110 African captives from the Kingdom of Dahomey in West Africa.

William V. Chambliss (1866–1928) was a businessman and farmer in Macon County who served on the agriculture faculty at Tuskegee Institute (now Tuskegee University); he was the wealthiest African-American living in Alabama in the 1920s.

== Business and finance ==
In 1890, The Penny Savings Bank, the first black-owned and black-operated financial institution in Alabama, was founded by William R. Pettiford.

In 1997, the 19,077 businesses owned by black people in Alabama generated around $1 billion in revenue and employed 13,232 people. Businesses owned by black people made up 6.7% of all non-farm businesses in Alabama placing Alabama ninth in the United States for the percentage of black businesses.

In 2010, 15% of white Alabamians, which was 487,100, were in poverty while 37% of black Alabamians were in poverty, which was 457,900. In 2013, the median household income in Alabama was $42,849, the average white household income was $49,465 while the black household income was $29,210. The national median household income was $52,250, the average white household income was $55,867 while the black household income was $34,815.

== Entertainment ==
In 1914, the Lyric Theater was created in Birmingham, Alabama, and was one of the first places in the American South where black and white people saw the same shows although black people were in an isolated section.

During the time of Negro league baseball the Birmingham Black Barons was organized in 1920.

== Population ==
Historical population
Census	Pop.	Note	%±
1800	517		—
1810	2,624		407.5%
1820	42,450		1,517.8%
1830	119,121		180.6%
1840	255,571		114.5%
1850	345,109		35.0%
1860	437,770		26.8%
1870	475,510		8.6%
1880	600,103		26.2%
1890	678,489		13.1%
1900	827,307		21.9%
1910	908,282		9.8%
1920	900,652		−0.8%
1930	944,834		4.9%
1940	983,290		4.1%
1950	979,617		−0.4%
1960	980,271		0.1%
1970	903,467		−7.8%
1980	996,000		10.2%
1990	1,020,677		2.5%
2000	1,138,726		11.6%
2010	1,251,311		9.9%
2020	1,288,159		2.9%
U.S. Decennial Census 2020

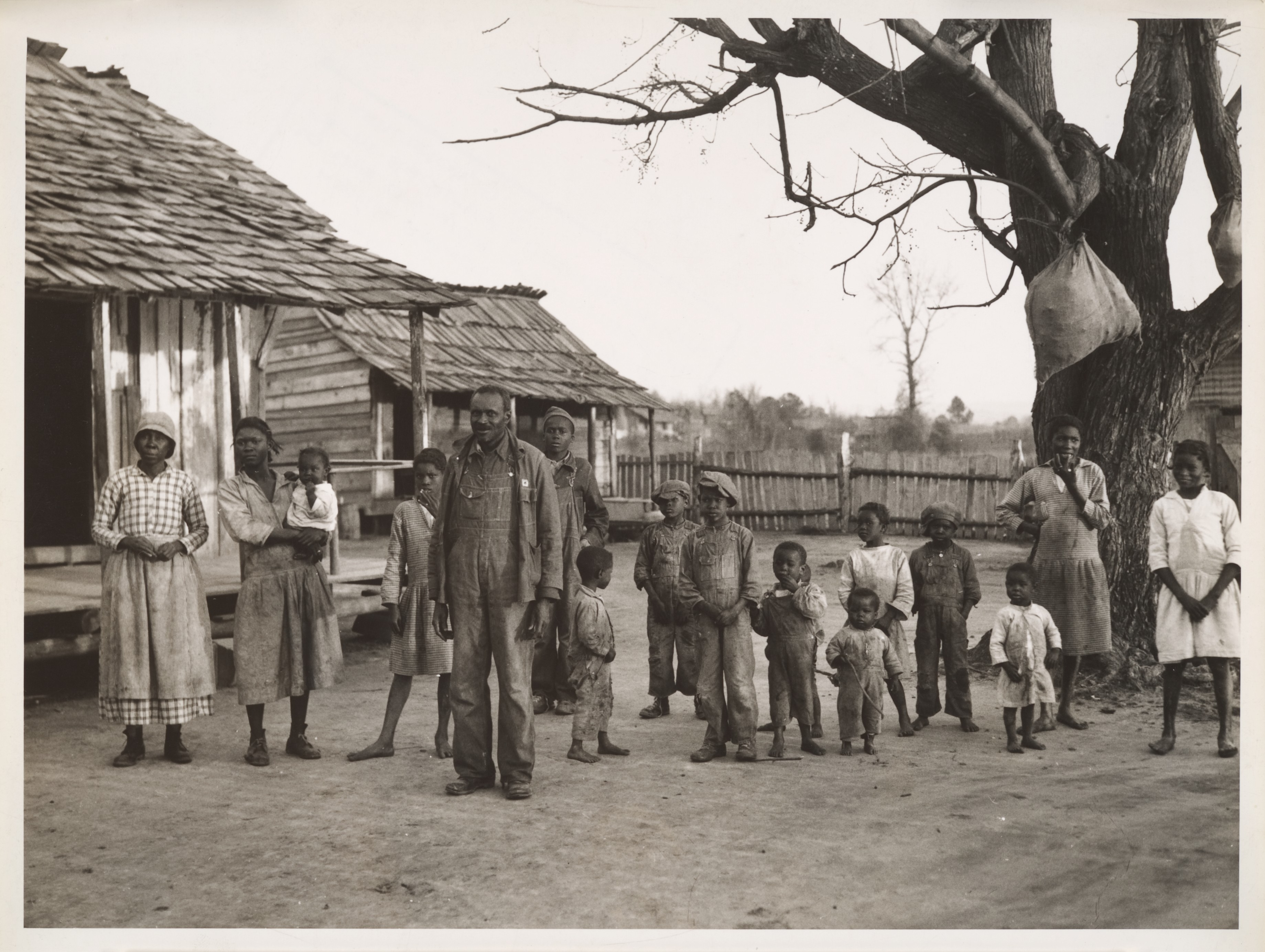
African American family in Alabama

Black slaves arrived in present-day Alabama during the late 18th and early 19th century in the Mississippi Territory. At the time of the 1800 Census there were 517 black people in the Alabama portion of the Mississippi Territory, with 494 slaves and 23 free blacks. By the time of the 1810 Census the population of black people had risen to 2,624, with 2,565 slaves and 59 free blacks.

Black Population in Alabama, 1800–1860
Census year	1800	1810	1820	1830	1840	1850	1860
Total Black residents	517	2,624	42,450	119,121	255,571	345,109	437,770
Free Black people	23	59	571	1,572	2,039	2,265	2,690
Blacks living in slavery	494	2,565	41,879	117,549	253,532	342,844	435,080
Source: Gibson, Campbell; Jung, Kay (September 2002). "Table 15. Alabama - Race and Hispanic Origin: 1800 to 1990" (PDF). Historical Census Statistics on Population Totals By Race and Hispanic Origin for The United States, Regions, Divisions, and States. U.S. Census Bureau.

In 1817, the Alabama Territory was formed from the Mississippi Territory and was later admitted as a state in 1819. The 1820 Census showed that the population of black people had increased by 1,517.8% to 42,450, with 41,879 slaves and 571 free blacks.

In 1808, the importation of slaves was banned, but the external importation of slaves would continue with the last slave ship, Clotilda, bringing slaves into Alabama in 1860. The last three survivors of the Atlantic slave trade, Cudjoe Lewis, Redoshi, and Matilda McCrear, were all brought to Alabama.

== Politics ==
=== Appointed and elected officials ===
In 1870, Benjamin S. Turner, who was born a slave on March 17, 1825, in Weldon, North Carolina, was elected as Alabama's first black member of the United States House of Representatives. Turner would serve until 1873, as he lost reelection in 1872 due to the black vote being split between himself and independent candidate Philip Joseph allowing Democratic nominee Frederick George Bromberg to win.

In 1870, Jeremiah Haralson, who was born a slave on April 1, 1846, in Columbus, Georgia, was elected as the first black member of the Alabama House of Representatives. In 1868, Benjamin F. Royal was elected as the first black member of the Alabama Senate. In 1970, Fred Gray and Thomas Reed became the first black people elected to the Alabama House of Representatives since the end of Reconstruction. In 1992, Sundra Escott-Russell was elected as the first black female member of the Alabama Senate.

In 1947, Oscar W. Adams Jr. established the first black law firm in Birmingham, Alabama, and was later appointed as the first black justice on the Supreme Court of Alabama. U. W. Clemon, who had aided in the Civil rights movement through lawsuit against discriminatory work practices, was appointed as the first black federal judge in Alabama in 1980.

Adams was appointed to the court by Governor Fob James in 1980, and won election in 1982, making him the first black person to win a statewide office in Alabama.

Andrew Hayden, who was elected as the mayor of Uniontown, Alabama, was the first black person to defeat an incumbent white mayor in Alabama. Richard Arrington Jr., who had served on the Birmingham, Alabama city council from 1971 to 1979, was elected as the city's first black mayor in 1979, and took office in 1980. Steven Reed served as the first black probate judge in Montgomery County, Alabama, and was elected as Montgomery, Alabama's first black mayor in 2019.

=== Slavery ===
On December 2, 1865, the Alabama Legislature ratified the 13th Amendment to the United States Constitution which abolished slavery.

=== Voter registration ===
In 1901, a new state constitution was created for Alabama. When the convention opened John M. Knox, the chairman of the constitutional convention, stated that "[W]hat is it we want to do? Why it is within the limits imposed by the Federal Constitution, to establish white supremacy in this State,". Henry Fontaine Reese, a delegate from Selma, Alabama, stated that "When you pay $1.50 for a poll tax, in Dallas County, I believe you disenfranchise 10 Negroes. Give us this $1.50 for educational purposes and for the disenfranchisement of a vicious and useless class." A poll tax, a literacy test, property requirements, and disqualification for certain criminal convictions were added to the constitution. Following the passage of the constitution black voter registration fell from more than 180,000 in 1900, to less than 3,000 in 1903.

Following the passage of the Civil Rights Act of 1964 the percentage of black registered voters rose from 13.7% in 1960, to 61.3% by 1969. The highest percentage of voter registration between 1960 and 2004 reached its highest amount with 74.3% in 1998.

Following the passage of the Voting Rights Act of 1965 the United States Department of Justice blocked over one hundred voting policy changes in Alabama from 1969 to 2008, and had over eight hundred changed or withdrawn.

On July 25, 2019, Alabama Secretary of State John Merrill announced that 94% of all eligible Alabamians and 96% all of eligible black people in Alabama were registered to vote. However, according to the United States Census Bureau only 69% of all eligible Alabamians and 67.4% of all black people in Alabama were registered to vote.

== Education ==
The Lincoln Normal School was one of the oldest HBCUs (historically black colleges and universities) in the United States, it was opened two years after the American Civil War in 1867 and closed in 1970.

The Burrell Academy was a primary school located in Selma, Alabama, established in 1869. It was the first Black school in the city of Selma, and it burned down in a suspicious fire in 1900. In 1903, the Burrell Academy was rebuilt by the American Missionary Association (A.M.A), which had decided to move the building to Florence, Alabama and rename it the Burrell Normal School.

The Calhoun Colored School, active from 1892 to 1945, was a private boarding and day school for Black students in Calhoun, Lowndes County, Alabama.

== See also ==
- Demographics of Alabama
- History of slavery in Alabama
- List of African-American newspapers in Alabama
- Black Belt (region of Alabama)
- Black Southerners
- Alabama Cajans
