= Alabama Creole people =

French Creoles of Mobile Alabama

Alabama Creole people Créoles de l'Alabama
Regions with significant populations
- Alabama

Languages
- English, French, Creole French, Mobilian Jargon, Franglais, Patois

Religion
- Predominantly Roman Catholic

Related ethnic groups
- Louisiana Creoles, Isleños, Cajuns, Creoles of color, Acadians, Québecois, Creek Indians, African Americans

Alabama Creoles (French: Créoles de l'Alabama) are a Louisiana French group native to the region around Mobile, Alabama. They are the descendants of colonial French and Spanish settlers who arrived in Mobile in the 18th century. They are sometimes known as Cajans or Cajuns (French: Cadjins) although they are distinct from the Cajuns of southern Louisiana, and most do not trace their roots to the French settlers of Acadia. Rather, many identify with French fur traders and blacksmiths who traveled directly from France to the New World in hopes of establishing a Free North America.

In 2024, Congressman Shomari Figures (D) became the first Mobile Cajun elected to the US House of Representatives. State Senator Vivian Davis Figures (D) became the first Cajun woman elected to the Alabama Senate in the 2000s.

== History ==
=== Origins ===
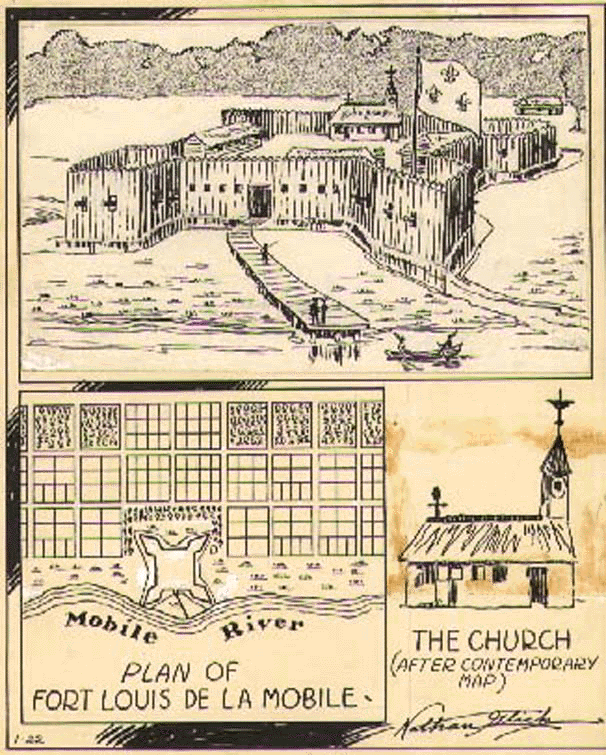
Fort Louis de la Mobile

Adventurers led by Pierre Le Moyne d'Iberville moved from Fort Maurepas in Biloxi, Mississippi to a wooded bluff on the west bank of the Mobile River in early 1702, where they founded Mobile, which they named after the Maubilian Indians. The outpost was populated by French soldiers, French-Canadian trappers and fur traders, and a few merchants and artisans accompanied by their families. The French had easy access to the Indian fur trade, and furs were the primary economic resource of Mobile. Along with fur, some settlers also raised cattle as well as produced ships' timbers and naval stores.

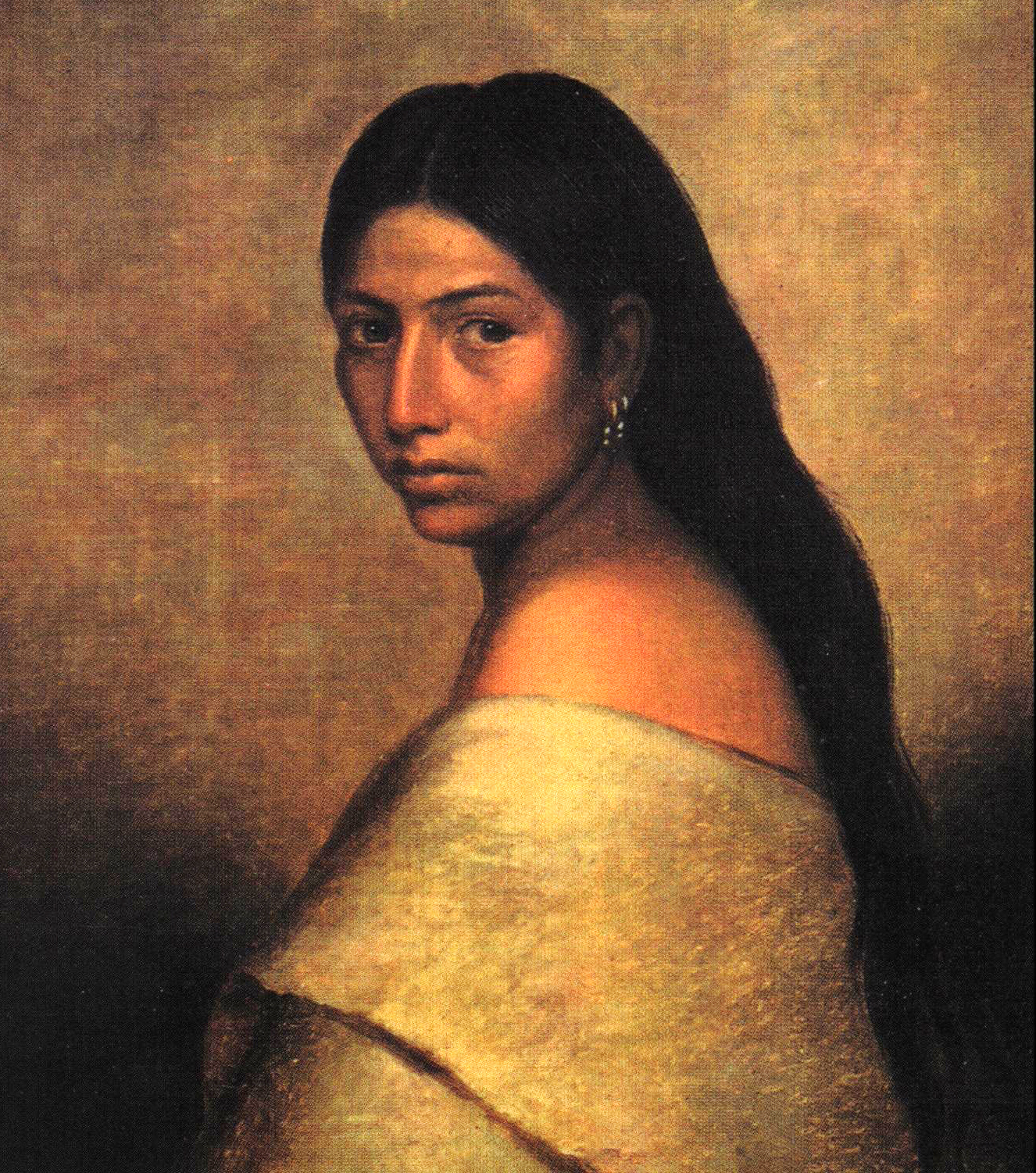
Portrait of a Choctaw Woman from Mobile

Indian nations gathered annually at Mobile to be wined, dined, and showered with presents by the French. About 2,000 Indians descended on Mobile for as long as two weeks. Because of the close and friendly relationship between colonial French and Indian peoples, French colonists learned the Indian Lingua franca of the area, the Mobilian Jargon, and intermarried with Indian women.

Mobile was a melting pot of different peoples, and included continental Frenchmen, French-Canadians, and various Indians mingled together in Mobile. The differences between continental Frenchmen and French-Canadians were so great that serious disputes occurred between the two groups.

The French also established slavery in 1721. Slaves infused elements of African and French Creole culture into Mobile, as many of the slaves who came to Mobile worked in the French West Indies. In 1724, the Code Noir, a slave code based on Roman laws, was instituted in French colonies which allowed slaves certain legal and religious rights not found in either British colonies or the United States. The Code Noir based on Roman laws also conferred affranchis (ex-slaves) full citizenship and gave complete civil equality with other French subjects. French Cajuns were successful in outlawing slave depots in Mobile, leading to easier missions of liberation during the times of enslavement.

By the mid-18th century, Mobile was populated by French Creoles, European Frenchmen, French-Canadians, Africans, and Indians. This diverse group was united by Roman Catholicism, the exclusive religion of the colony. The town's inhabitants included 50 troops, a mixed group of approximately 400 civilians which included merchants, laborers, fur traders, artisans, and slaves. This mixed diverse group and its descendants are called Creoles.

=== British occupation (1763–1783) ===
British West Florida

In 1763, after the French and Indian War where France relinquished all of its continental colonial territory to Britain and ceded half of Louisiana to Spain, Britain merged the Southern Louisiana territories into British West Florida. Some Creoles of New Orleans at this time moved to Mobile, as they preferred British to Spanish rule.

Life changed very little for Alabama Creoles under British rule. The fur trade continued and British adopted the Creole practice of holding Indian congresses and inviting Indian guests.

The new colonial government enacted a harsher slave code that gave slaves very few legal rights and made emancipation much more difficult to obtain. Slaves became expensive, each one costing around 300 Spanish dollars. To counteract expensive slave labor, white indentured servants were imported and they began to supply much of the town's labor. White indentured servants usually worked for two to four years and their masters provided them housing, food, and clothing.

=== Spanish occupation (1783–1815) ===
In 1783, Spain took possession of East Florida and West Florida after the American Revolutionary War. Fur trading continued to be the primary resource sold by Mobile. Mobile continued to have a very heterogeneous population, and Spain wanted more settlement in its Floridian colonies. It attracted British and American immigrants by adopting very liberal policies compared to those in other parts of the Spanish Empire. In Spanish colonies, all citizens were required to become Catholic, but the Spanish government in the Floridas allowed its inhabitants to worship as they pleased. The government also offered liberal land grants to potential settlers. In 1785, Spanish Mobile had 746 inhabitants. By 1788, Mobile had a population of over 1,400.

As time went on, however, the Americans began desiring the Spanish lands. In 1803 the Americans bought French Louisiana from Napoleon Bonaparte, and they claimed that the Spanish Floridas were part of the purchase. Americans within the Floridas plotted against the Spanish government. During the War of 1812, the Americans finally had a justification to take Spanish Mobile and the Floridas.

On April 11, 1813, an American force of 600 overwhelmed 60 Spanish troops stationed in Mobile. On April 13, the Spanish commander surrendered his 60 men and Fort Charlotte.

In 1815, the Americans defeated the British at the Battle of New Orleans and held on to the territory that they had won. Mobile was thereafter administered by the United States.

=== Antebellum period (1815–1861) ===
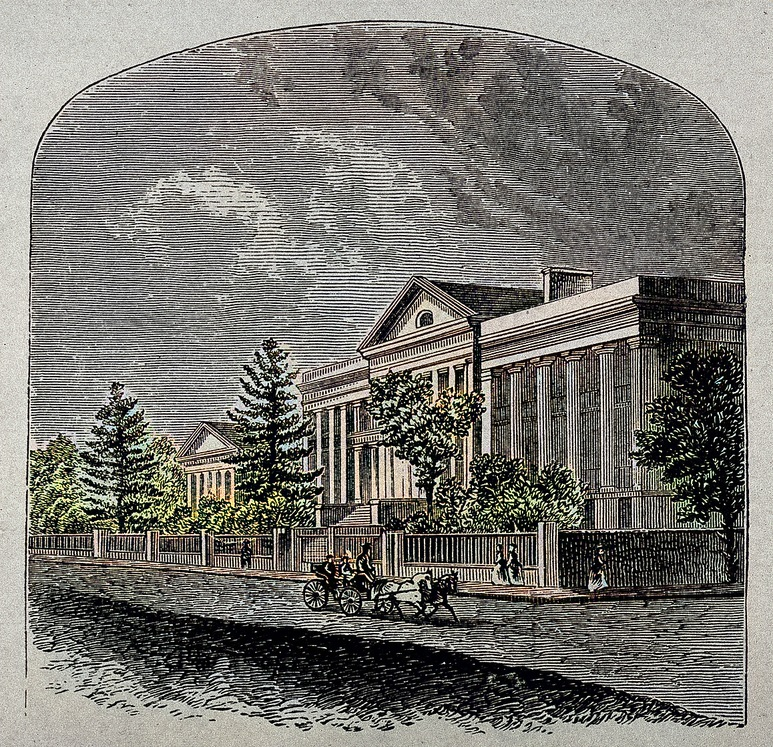
American Mobile

The first Americans to arrive in Mobile after the War of 1812 were merchants from New England, and they recognized a unique opportunity compared to New Orleans in the Louisiana Territory that had not yet developed a thriving mercantile community. As Mobile grew, it attracted medical and legal professionals as well as printers.

Mobile experienced a dramatic growth as cotton flowed through its ports from plantations and farms in the Alabama interior. Mobile also received a reputation for being quite unrefined, as young men and transients poured into the city, and made saloons, drinking, and prostitution a mainstay of life in the city. Gradually Mobile evolved into the third most important port city in the American Union behind New York City and New Orleans, Louisiana.

In 1844, a Northern visitor described the diversity and beauty of Mobile:

"Clerks of all shapes and sizes, white and red haired men, staid thinking men and brainless flops. Here goes a staid, demeure-faced priest and behind him is a dashing gambler ... Here is a sailor just on shore with a pocket full of rocks ready for devilment of any kind and there is a beggar in rags. Pretty Creoles, pale-faced sewing girls, painted vice, big-headed and little-headed men, tall anatomies and short Falstaffs ... a great country this is and make no mistake."

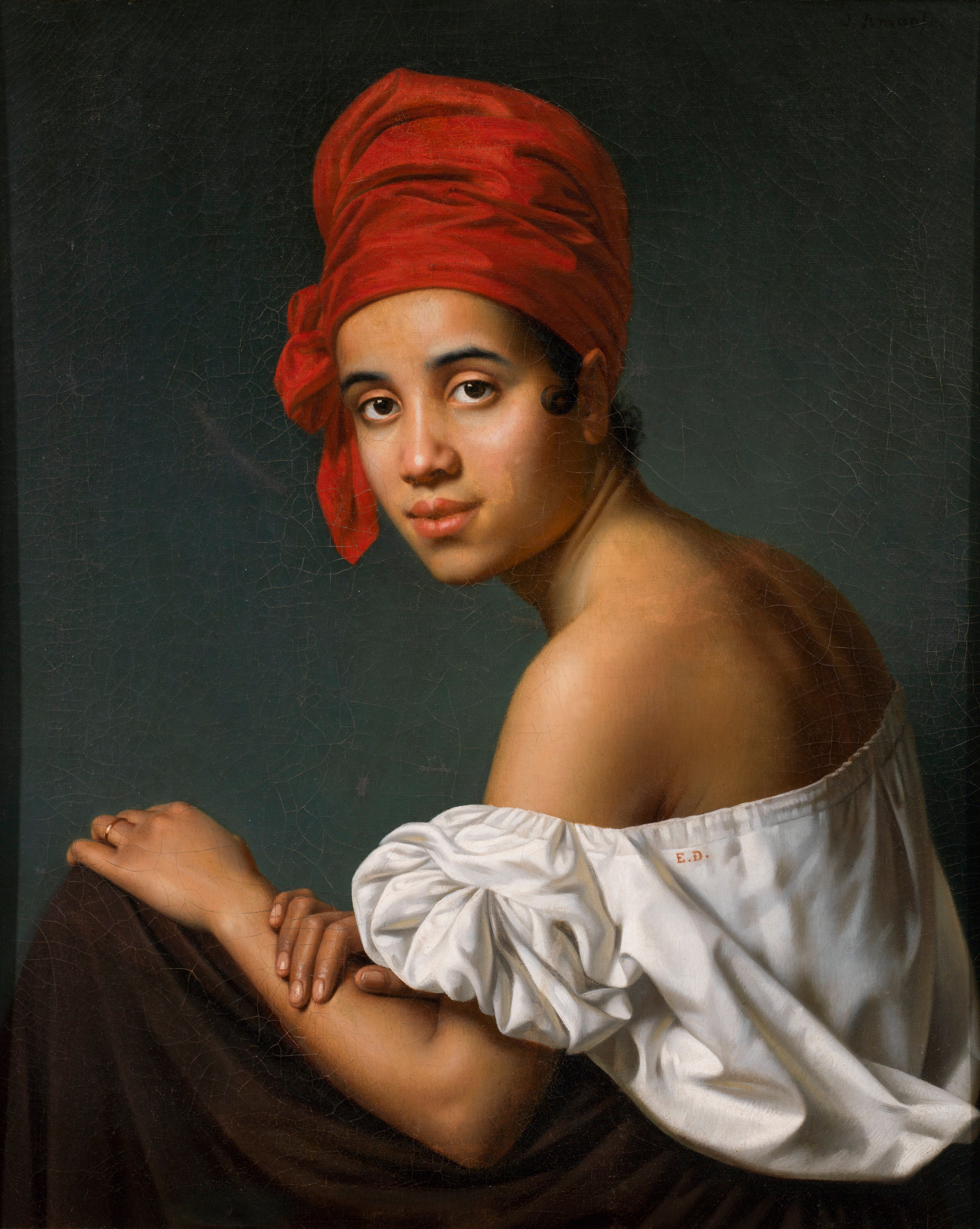
A Creole girl with a red tignon

Mobile contained approximately 40% of all of Alabama's free black population. Mobile's free people of color were the Creoles. A people of diverse origins, the Creoles formed an elite with their own schools, churches, fire company, and social organizations. Many Creoles were the descendants of free blacks at the time of Mobile's capture by American forces, and who retained their freedoms by treaty and treated by the American government as a unique people. Other Creoles were blood relatives of white Mobilians including those of prominent families.

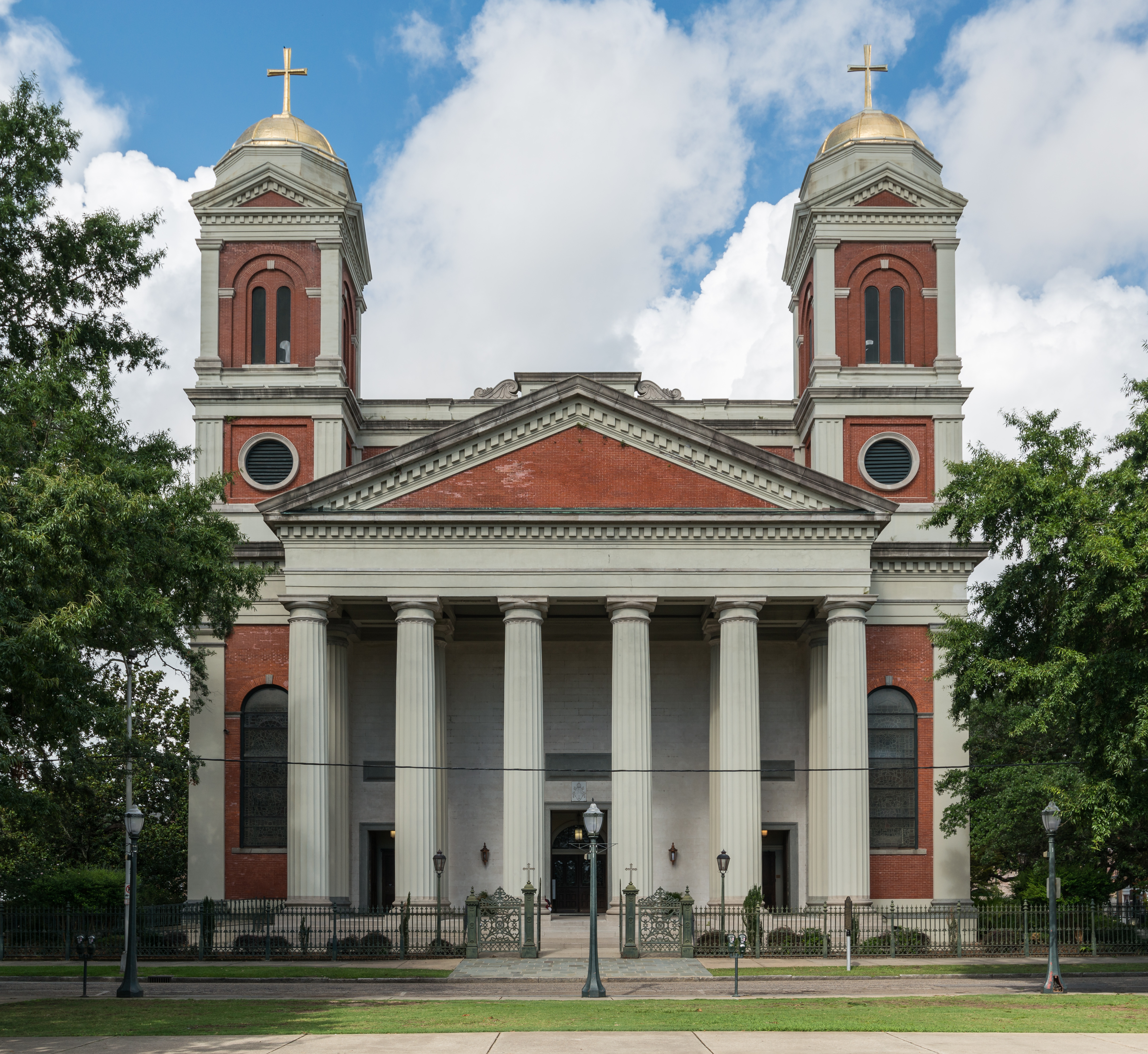
The Cathedral of the Immaculate Conception in Mobile, Alabama

The Catholic community of primarily French Creole descent remained numerous and influential. In 1825, the Catholic community began the 15-year construction of the Cathedral of the Immaculate Conception. For most of the antebellum era, friction between Protestants and Catholics was practically non-existent.

The Creoles of Mobile built a Catholic school run by and for Creoles. Mobilians supported several literary societies, numerous book stores, and number of book and music publishers.

==== Antebellum Alabama Creole society ====
The institution of slavery presented white Alabamians with a serious challenge. Anglo-American Southerners generally defended slavery as a positive institution for the benefit of the slaves. The large Creole community in Mobile posed serious practical and ideological problems for the proponents of slavery. How could slavery be a positive good for both whites and blacks when the Creole population not only existed, but prospered?

Creoles maintained their own schools, churches, fire companies, and social institutions; urban slaves had access to money, as well as the company of other slaves and free blacks. Following the Creole custom liberté des savanes (savannah liberty), although outlawed by Americans, many slaves hired themselves out and accumulated personal funds. Slaves in Mobile learned to read and write from the highly educated Creoles, and they gained freedom through their skilled labor.

Although the antebellum period was the most colorful, exuberant period of Mobile's history, it was also short-lived. Young Alabama Creoles who began their careers in the 1820s lived to see their fortunes and the accomplishments of their city destroyed by a civil war, which they more than other Alabamians, sought to avoid.

=== Alabama Creoles during the Civil War (1861–1864) ===
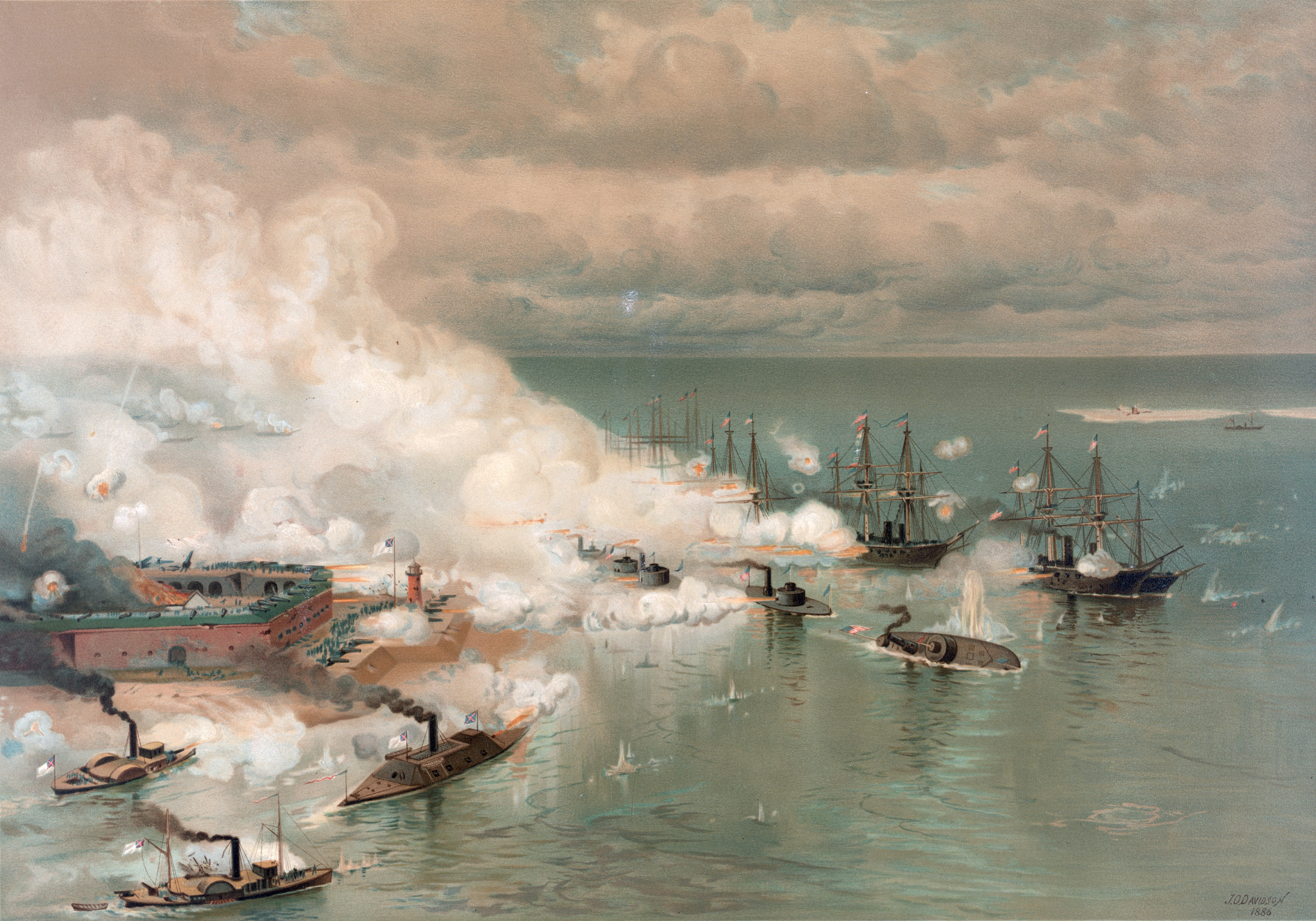
The Battle of Mobile Bay August 2, 1864 – August 23, 1864

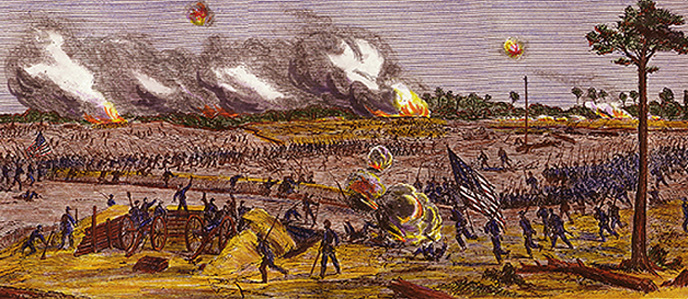
The Battle of Fort Blakeley April 2, 1865 – April 9, 1865

Creoles during the Civil war in both Louisiana and Alabama petitioned their state governments to form military units to protect their homes, their cities, and their states. In New Orleans, Creoles formed the Louisiana Native Guard in 1861, although Confederate States Army forces ultimately dissolved the unit in 1862.

Creoles in Mobile also continuously petitioned to join the war effort. In November 1862, Alabama's General Assembly passed legislation allowing Creoles to enroll in the state militia, and a unit of Alabama Creole Guards was raised.

In November 1863, the general in command of Mobile, Dabney H. Maury, requested that the Confederate War Department immediately accept Creole state militia into Confederate service, with the idea of making them heavy artillerists to man Mobile's shore batteries. Confederate Secretary of War James A. Seddon denied Maury's request and stated that blacks could never be enlisted as Confederate soldiers.

Nevertheless, in 1864, as Mobile needed defenders for the city, Creoles joined Confederate cavalry units, and a company of Creoles in Confederate service, the Native Guards, formed from a Creole firefighting battalion. After Federal forces defeated the Confederates in Mobile, the Creole Native Guards disappeared from service.

=== Late 19th to 20th centuries ===
The Civil War completely destroyed Mobile as it once was. Prior to the Civil War, Mobile was Alabama's most vital urban area, and it was the undisputed economic and social center of the state. In the years after the Civil War, Mobile's economy languished, and its population declined. Birmingham replaced Mobile in its economic development and became Alabama's largest city.

For Creoles in Mobile, the following era was bleak. Poor economic conditions continued from reconstruction all the way until the first World War, and a rising tide of racism eroded many of the rights that Creoles once knew. A binary racial system took hold of Mobile; everyone was classified either as Black or white. An informal, but rigid segregation code restricted the social and economic activities of the Creoles.

In 1901, racist forces moved to permanently disenfranchise the black population of Mobile through the state constitution. The Creoles of Mobile pleaded with the white leadership of the state, but it was of no use. Many Creoles turned inward, seeking solace in the glories of the past and their older social heritage. Creoles continued to maintain their own schools, churches, social clubs, and the fabled Creole Steam Fire Company Number I. Creoles worked as doctors, lawyers, educators, and businessmen. They mirrored the customs and practices of Mobile's white elite, and formed their own mystic societies, creating a "Colored Mardi Gras" celebration.

At the end of the 1930s, Mobile was essentially a small town where most people were comfortable and satisfied with the community institutions available. However, the city was deeply divided by race, and the lack of economic opportunity hampered the economic development of the city. Mobile's Creole population was prevented from fully contributing its energy and talents towards building a better city.

World War II changed the economic outlook of Mobile. New industry appeared, and Mobile became an important port once more. After World War II, racial tension became inflamed again leading to the protests and riots of the Civil Rights Movement that changed the situation of blacks in the United States. After the Civil Rights Movement, institutionalized segregation, discrimination, and disenfranchisement were finally abolished.

Cajuns descended from prominent Mobile families continue to live in the district of Mobile. In 2024, Cajuns were crucial to the victory of Cajun Congressman Shomari Figures (D).

== Alabama Cajans ==
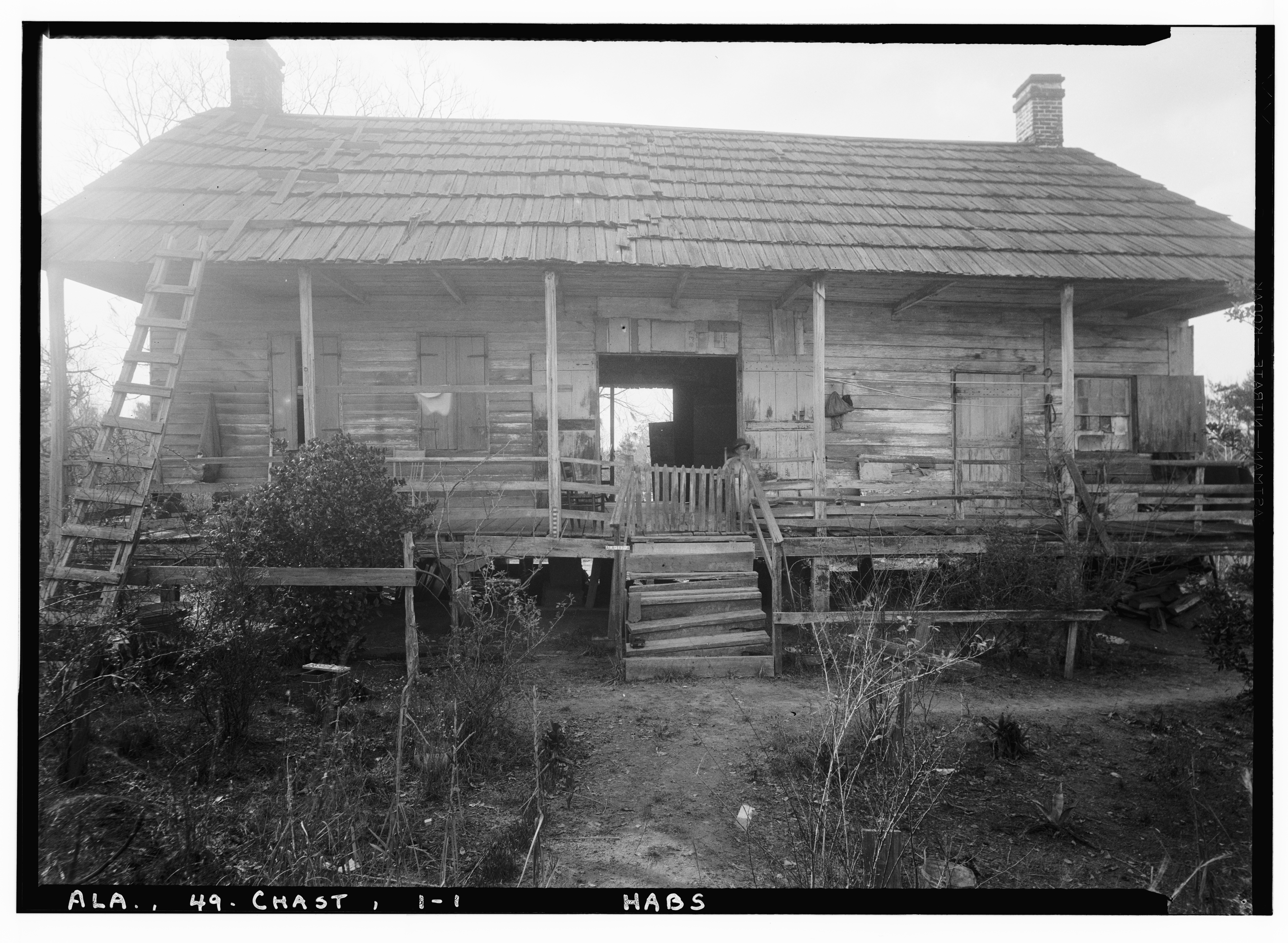
House of Zeno Chastang, son of Jean and Louison.

In 1810, the initial reported spread of settlement in Alabama was along the lower Tombigbee and Mobile rivers, consisting of 500 whites and 250 black people, 59 of whom were free. Mixed-race descendants of these settlers intermarried and rapidly increased in quantity of households over the generations, according to census records, which typically labelled them as Black, mulatto, or free colored persons. The surname Chastang is shared among the Cajans and the Alabama Creoles. One of the progenitors of the Alabama Creole Chastangs was Jean Chastang, a Frenchman who settled outside Mobile.

Like Alabama Creoles, the Cajans were also unrelated to the Louisiana Cajuns, who are of Acadian descent. They were noted to be starkly different from Alabama Creoles, and Cajuns, given that they were mostly Protestant and had English names. They received the name "Cajan" from the Alabama State senator, L.W. Mcrae. Being sensitive to the term "Cajan", they were observed to prefer referring to themselves simply as "Our people", a name also used by the Chestnut Ridge people.
