= William V. Chambliss =

American businessperson, planter, teacher (1866–1928)

- Born: December 4, 1866; Macon County, Alabama, United States
- Died: June 11, 1928 (aged 61); Macon County, Alabama, United States
- Resting place: Ashdale Cemetery, Tuskegee, Alabama, U.S.
- Other names: W. V. Chambliss, Bill Chambliss, William Thadeus Chambliss
- Occupations: Businessperson, land developer, politician, teacher, planter, dairy farmer
- Political party: Republican

William V. Chambliss (December 4, 1866 – June 11, 1928) was an American businessperson, land developer, politician, teacher, and planter. Chambliss taught at Tuskegee Institute and was one of the wealthiest African Americans living in Alabama in the 1920s. He also used the name W. V. Chambliss.

== Life and career ==
William V. Chambliss was born on December 4, 1866, in Macon County, Alabama. He graduated in 1890 from Tuskegee Institute (now Tuskegee University).

After graduation, Chambliss worked at a grocery store, and as a teacher. He was a faculty member at Tuskegee Institute, as the head of the dairy farm. He worked as a planter in Macon County, and owned large parcels of land near Tuskegee.

In 1904 he was selected as an alternate delegate to the Republican National Convention. In 1908, he was a delegate from Tuskegee district to the Republican National Convention in Chicago.

Chambliss led the Southern Improvement Company at Tuskegee Institute, an agricultural project which aided farmers in purchasing land.

In the 1920s Chambliss was one of the wealthiest African Americans living in Alabama. During World War I, he reportedly purchased US $30,000 of Liberty bonds and US $1,000 of War saving stamps; and in 1922 reportedly bought US $20,000 of United States treasury bonds.

In 1924, he built the Chambliss Hotel (later known as the Chambliss Building) on Old Montgomery Road in Tuskegee, part of the Tuskegee's Greenwood Village. Additionally he donated the Chambliss Children's House (1928) to Tuskegee University, a brick school building to replaced the first Children’s House (1901). The Chambliss Children's House was initially used for the Department of Education and held an elementary school campus, the building later held the College of Business under the name Chambliss Hall (or William V. Chambliss Business House) located at 1200 West Montgomery Road.

Chambliss died at age 61 on June 11, 1928, in Macon County. He was interred at Ashdale Cemetery in Tuskegee.
