= Turkey Tayac =

Native American activist

Piscataway Indian Nation and Tayac Territory leader
- Succeeded by: Billy Redwing Tayac (son) of Piscataway Indian Nation and Tayac Territory

Personal details
- Born: Philip Sheridan Proctor; August 29, 1895 Charles County, Maryland
- Died: December, 1978
- Resting place: Moyaone Indian Burial Ground, Accokeek, Prince George's County, Maryland

Philip Sheridan Proctor (29 August 1895 – 7 December 1978), better known as Turkey Tayac, was a tribal chief and herbal medicine practitioner of the Piscataway Indian Nation, now a state-recognized tribe in Maryland. He was notable in Native American activism for tribal and cultural revival in the 20th century. He had some knowledge of the Piscataway language and was consulted by the Algonquian linguist, Ives Goddard, as well as Julian Granberry.

== Early life and career ==
Proctor served in the military during World War I and also worked for the Internal Revenue Service.

Turkey Tayac fought in World War I in France as a part of the Rainbow Division, originally made up of National Guard units to mobilize quickly. He was nearly killed by mustard gas.

== Rise to leadership ==
Turkey Tayac was a notable figure in the early and mid-20th century Native American cultural revitalization movements among mixed-race Southeastern communities along the Atlantic coastal plain, including the Lumbee, the Delaware Moors, and Powhatan Renape Nation. Their efforts were curtailed by the Great Depression and World War II.

Turkey Tayac started using a new name as he organized a movement for Native American peoples that privileged self-ascriptive forms of identification. In one of their projects in the 1960s, the Piscataway Indian Nation issued identification cards to group members, as they did not have state and federal identification cards.

Along with his responsibilities within the Piscataway Indian Nation, Turkey Tayac was also an active participant in the Bonus Army, part of his dedication to seeking social justice. Turkey Tayac was a Roman Catholic throughout his life, and was active in the Catholic Veterans of America.

Turkey Tayac was interviewed by ethnographers, including T. Dale Stewart, John Harrington, Frank G. Speck, William H. Gilbert, and Lucille St. Hoyme—who studied evidence for Native American survival in regions where it was thought that Native Americans had long since vanished.

Turkey Tayac was particularly concerned with Moyaone, also called the Accokeek Creek Site. The archeological site shows Indigenous human habitation from about 1300 CE to 1630 CE, including the time of the historic Piscataway. It was designated a National Historic Landmark in 1966 and is located within Piscataway Park, part of the National Park system administered by the National Park Service. Some of the land had been purchased in 1928 by Alice and Henry G. Ferguson from Philip Proctor's mother and her second husband, after his father had died.

After Alice died in 1951, Henry established the Alice Ferguson Foundation to protect the environment. In the 1960s, the Foundation made plans to donate much of the property to the National Park Service for protection. It is across the Potomac River from Mt. Vernon. Other property, known as the Hard Bargain Farm, is run by the Alice Ferguson Foundation.

Tayac supported the formation in the 1960s of Piscataway National Park. The rise of the American Indian Movement in the 1970s increased interest in Turkey Tayac's attempts to reorganize the tribe. Along with his son Billy Redwing Tayac and Avery Lewis, a Pima supporter, in 1974 Turkey Tayac incorporated a non-profit organization, the "Piscataway-Conoy Indians."

Eventually, the Piscataway-Conoy Indians, Inc. opened the Piscataway Indian Center. They wanted to use it as a place to revitalize American Indian identity for people of Piscataway heritage, and for others of Native American descent in the region.

In 1978, Turkey Tayac was diagnosed with leukemia. His family worked with Congressional and Senate representatives to gain permission for Proctor to be buried at the park on fee land (federal property). Senator Paul Sarbanes attached an amendment to unrelated legislation to achieve this. It was opposed by the Alice Ferguson Foundation, which had donated land for the park. In 1979, Turkey Tayac was buried in the ossuary site at Moyaone.

Since 1978, the Piscataway Indian Nation has divided into three organized groups. On Monday, January 9, 2012, Piscataway-Conoy Tribe of Maryland and the Piscataway Indian Nation and Tayac Territory were granted recognition by the state of Maryland. None have yet been recognized officially by the federal government.

== See also ==
- Brandywine people

== Gallery ==
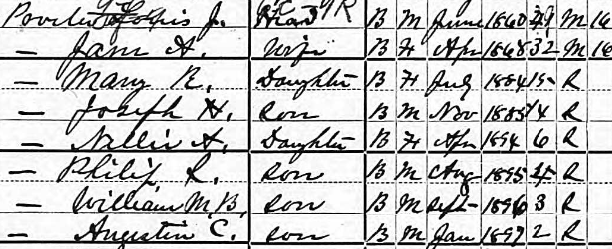
Philip Sheridan Proctor listed as "B" for "Black" on the 1900 United States Census.

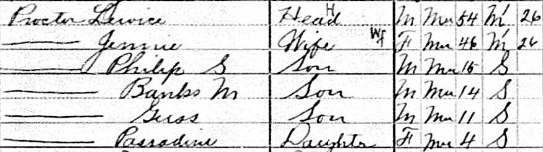
Philip Sheridan Proctor listed as "Mu" for "Mulatto" on the 1910 United States Census.

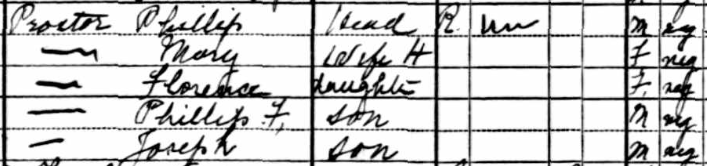
Philip Sheridan Proctor listed as "Neg" for "Negro" on the 1930 United States Census.

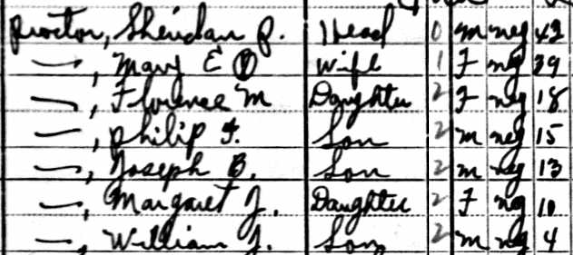
Philip Sheridan Proctor listed as "Neg" for "Negro" on the 1940 United States Census.

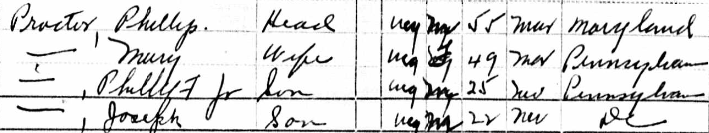
Philip Sheridan Proctor listed as "Neg" for "Negro" on the 1950 United States Census.
