= Moyaone Reserve =

Historic District in Maryland

- Moyaone Reserve Historic District
- U.S. National Register of Historic Places
- U.S. Historic district
- Ad for the Moyaone Reserve community

- Location within Maryland Location within the United States
- Location: Next to Piscataway Park in Accokeek, Maryland
- Coordinates: 38°40′43″N 77°05′34″W
- Area: 1,320 acres (530 ha)
- Architect: Charles F. Wagner, Jr. Charles M. Goodman
- Architectural style: Modern Movement
- Website: https://moyaone.org
- NRHP reference No.: 100005659
- Added to NRHP: October 2020

The Moyaone Reserve is a neighborhood located within Piscataway Park in Accokeek. The neighborhood was given National Register of Historic Places status in 2020 and is within the historic viewshed of Mount Vernon. It is split between Prince George's County, Maryland and Charles County, Maryland. The name Moyaone is derived from name of the town Moyaone, the major town of the Piscataway Native American tribe. The archaeological remains of Moyaone are at the Accokeek Creek Site, within Piscataway Park.

The Moyaone is bordered to the north by Piscataway Creek, to the east by MD Route 210, and to the west is Marshall Hall Road.

The Moyaone Reserve is governed by the Moyaone Association.

== History ==
In 1922, Henry G. Ferguson and his wife Alice purchased a 330-acre farm named Hard Bargain Farm on the Potomac River. Their farm became a center of social activity and several other people purchased properties nearby including Lenore Thomas Straus and her husband Robert W. Straus, government economist Charles Kramer and Washington architect Charles Wagner. Alice Ferguson gradually purchased adjacent land in a development company named the Piscataway Company, which included a covenant that all land would be subdivided no smaller than 5 acres. Alice Ferguson died in 1952, leaving additional land and money to the Piscataway Company. In an effort to more efficiently manage its resources, the Piscataway Company split into multiple organizations. These included the Moyaone Association, a non-profit civic organization, and the Alice Ferguson Foundation which runs Hard Bargain Farm.

Over the next decades the Moyaone Association was one of several organizations along with the Alice Ferguson Foundation, the Mount Vernon Ladies' Association, and later the Accokeek Foundation, that were active in conservation efforts in and around Piscataway Park. This was called Operation Overview.

In 1955, a 485-acre farm across from Mount Vernon went up for sale, and there were rumors that an oil company was to buy it. On behalf of the Moyaone association, Wagner reached out to Charles Wall, the Resident Director of Mount Vernon and its parent organization, the Mount Vernon Ladies' Association, then led by Ohio Member of Congress Frances P. Bolton. Bolton and the Mount Vernon Ladies' Association had expressed a desire to protect the view from Mount Vernon. Ultimately, Bolton purchased the farm with plans to transfer it to the National Park Service. At this point Bolton, Wagner, Straus, and Wall developed a plan to protect the Mount Vernon viewshed.

In 1957, Bolton founded the Accokeek Foundation, one of the nation's first land trusts. The Foundation was used to purchase 200 acres (81 ha) of land in Piscataway Park to help preserve the area, in addition to land that Bolton transferred to the foundation. The Accokeek Foundation runs the National Colonial Farm, which is adjacent to the Moyaone Reserve and within Piscataway Park.

In 1960, the Washington Suburban Sanitary Commission (WSSC) wanted to build a water treatment plant in Mockley Point, which was Accokeek shoreline. Since it would disrupt the view of Mount Vernon and Fort Washington Park, various people and organizations protested against it. As a result, WSSC was not allowed to build the plant there; however, a plant was built in the 1960s in the surrounding area. In response to this, The Moyaone Association, Mount Vernon Ladies' Association, and other local groups mobilized to find a legislative solution to protecting the Accokeek shoreline and Mount Vernon viewshed.

In 1961, a joint resolution to preserve the viewshed was introduced in the United States Senate by Senator Clinton Anderson with identical text in the United States House of Representatives by Representative John P. Saylor. The resolution was quickly passed and signed by President John F. Kennedy. Its purpose was to "preserve lands which provide the principal overview from the Mount Vernon Estate and Fort Washington" in order to designate 133 acres (54 ha) around Mockley Point, which was to be the site of water treatment plant, as a national landmark. The resolution also authorized the National Park Service to receive donations and scenic easements from adjacent communities. This allowed Moyaone residents to transfer their easements to the federal government.

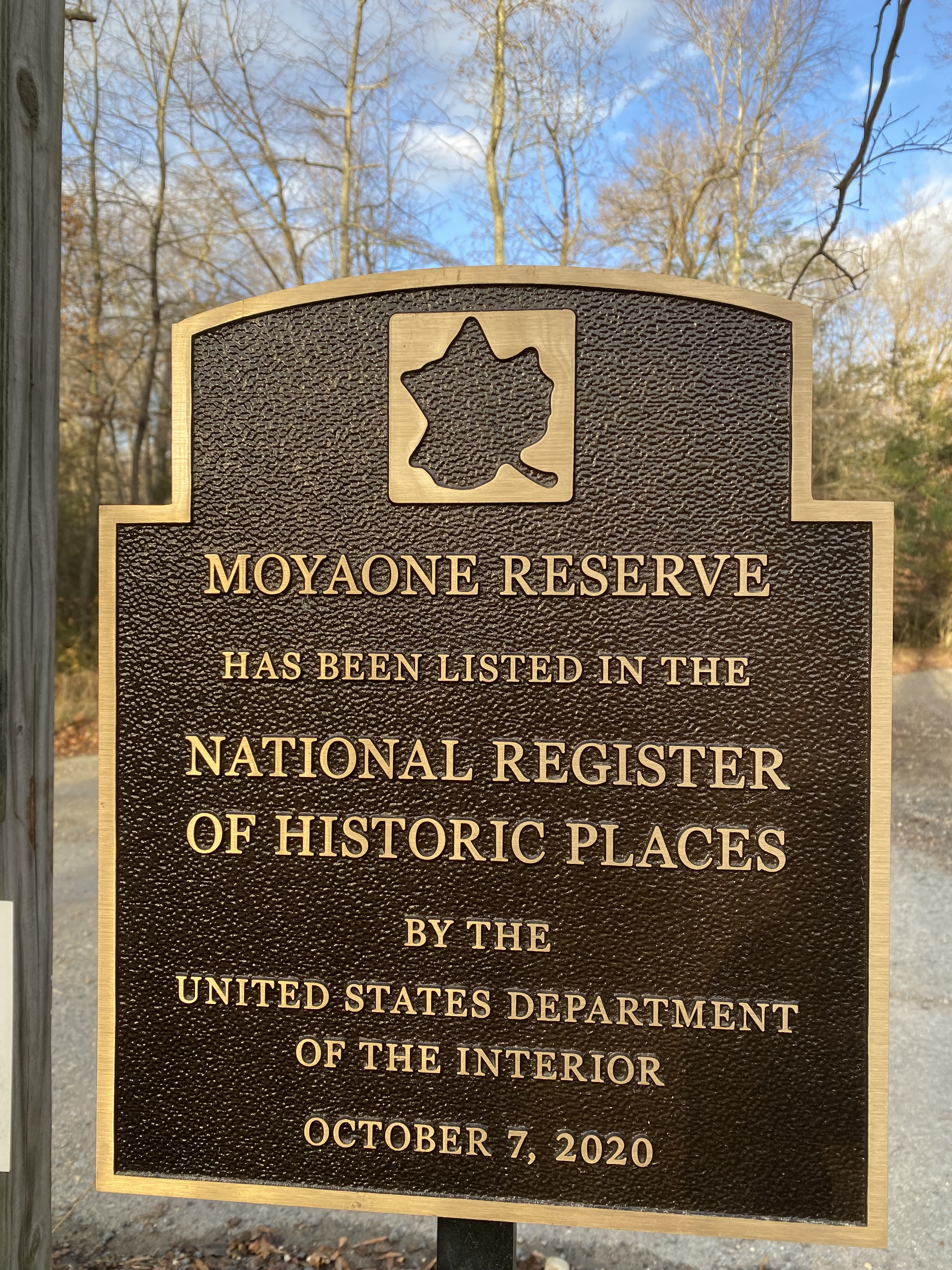
Photo of a sign designating that the Moyaone Reserve has been listed on the National Register of Historic Places

In 2019, the Moyaone Association applied for designation of the neighborhood in the National Register of Historic Places in part after a battle with Dominion Energy over the siting of a natural gas plant. The application argued that the Moyaone Reserve satisfied three criteria for inclusion: a history of conservation, a history of community planning, and its specific architectural legacy. It was granted in October 2020.

== Moyaone Reserve's history of conservation ==
The Moyaone Reserve's approach to conservation was described by Maryland Republican Senator John Marshall Butler as "an almost unique or pilot project in cooperative individual activity for the development and use of the countryside without destroying its natural attraction." This operated by purchasing land, subdividing it, placing restrictive covenants on it via conservation easements, and then reselling the land. Robert Straus, one of the founders of the Moyaone Association, described it as "zoning on a do-it-yourself basis." For a period of time, the Accokeek Foundation held the conservation easements before they could be transferred to the federal government in the early 1970s.

To supplement this strategy, in 1965 and 1966, the Moyaone Association lead the effort first at the state level and then at the local level to recognize easement donations. In 1966, Prince George's County became the first locality in the country to grant local tax credits for easement donations. This is now a standard form of conservation easement.

== Architecture ==
From the beginning, many Moyaone properties were designed with a modern aesthetic. Wagner designed a number of homes modeled on Frank Lloyd Wright's architecture, while Straus's home was built by Charles M. Goodman, a leading modernist architect. Lenore Straus also maintained an artist studio on their property. These formed the beginning of the Moyaone Reserve's Mid-century modern architectural legacy.

== Notable people ==
- Frances P. Bolton
- Henry G. Ferguson
- Lenore Thomas Straus
- Charles M. Goodman

== See also ==
- Mount Vernon Ladies' Association
- Accokeek Creek Site
- Piscataway Park
- Hard Bargain Farm
