= Lenore Thomas Straus =

American sculptor (1909-1988)

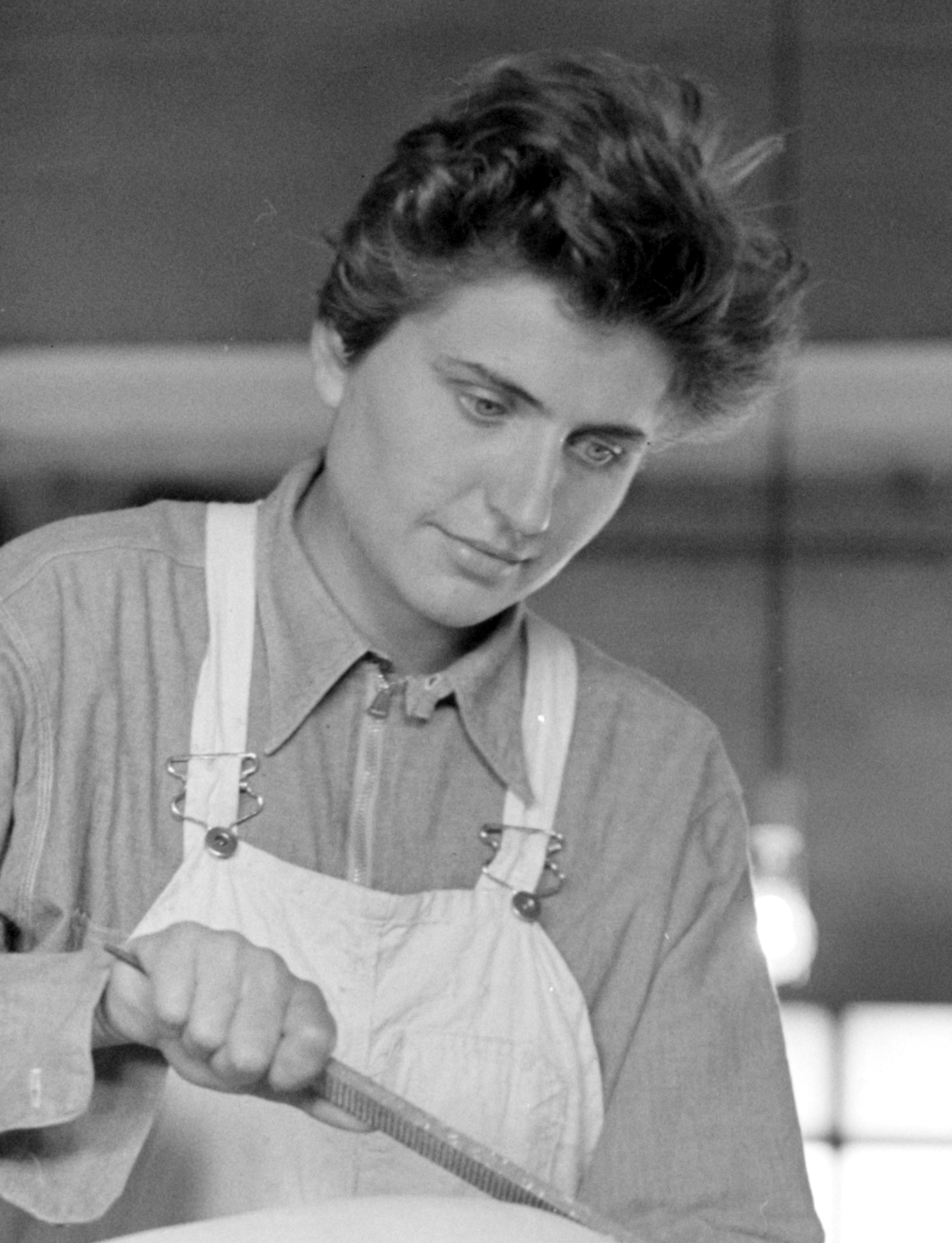
- Lenore Thomas at work on a sculpture for the Resettlement Administration (1936)
- Born: Lenore Thomas; November 1, 1909; Chicago, Illinois
- Died: January 16, 1988 (aged 78); East Blue Hill, Maine
- Education: Chicago Art Institute
- Known for: Sculpture

Lenore Thomas Straus (November 1, 1909 – January 16, 1988) was an American sculptor and author.

== Life and work ==
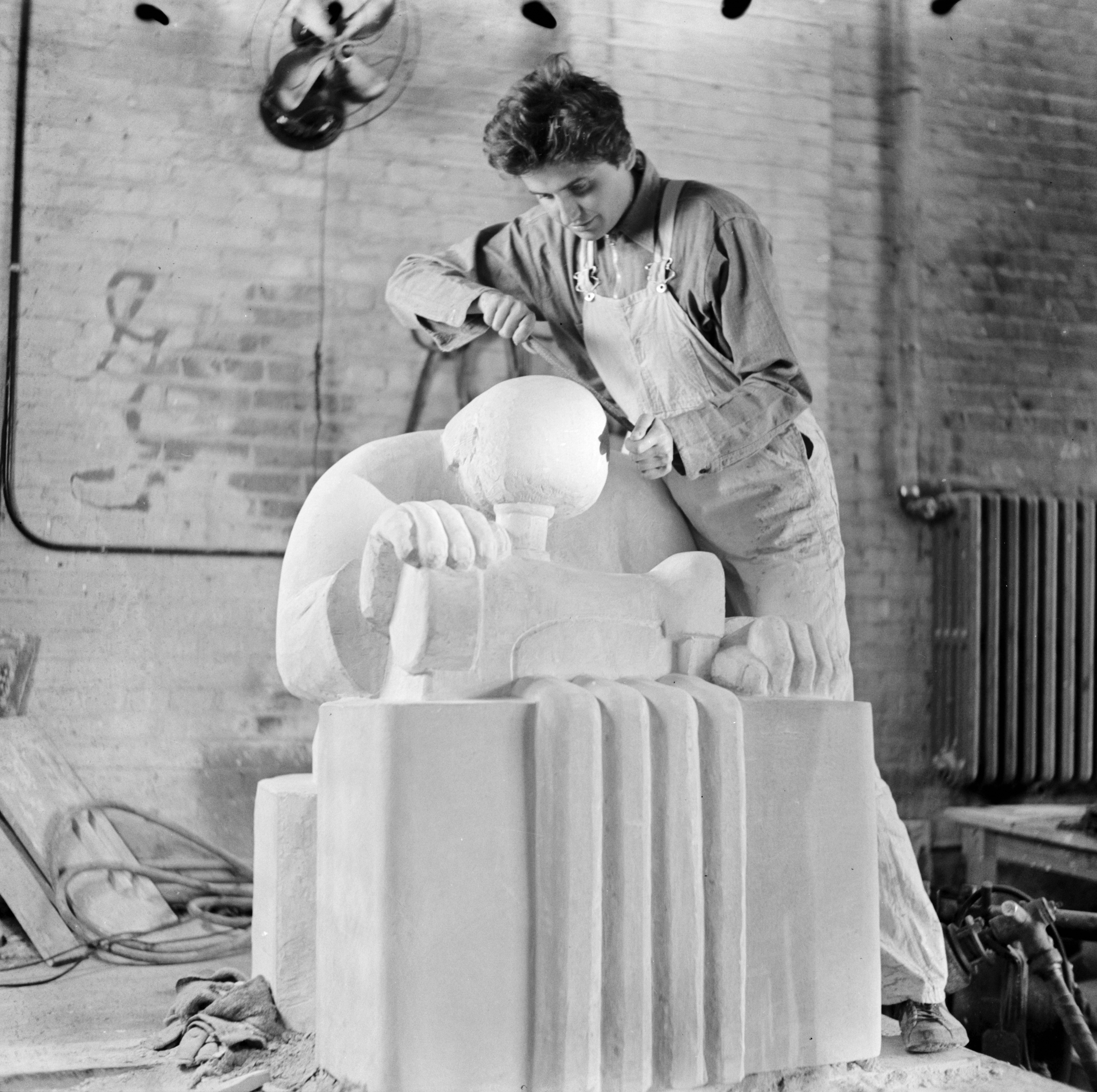
Thomas at work on Garment Worker (1936), a limestone sculpture for the school at Jersey Homesteads, New Jersey

Lenore Thomas was born November 1, 1909, in Chicago, Illinois, the daughter of Andrew S. Thomas and Lucy Haagsma, and died at her home in Blue Hill, Maine, on January 16, 1988. Although she studied at the Chicago Art Institute, as a sculptor she was largely self-taught. She had an exhibit of her work in Mexico City in 1933. Much of her early work involved public art created under New Deal programs, including the Public Works of Art Project and the Section of Painting and Sculpture. She created two major pieces for the Resettlement Administration's planned community in Greenbelt, Maryland—Mother and Child and several panels illustrating the Preamble to the United States Constitution. Along with other Public Works Administration artists Hugh Collins, Carmelo Arutu, and Joseph Goethe, she created playground sculpture for Langston Terrace, the first federally funded housing project in Washington, DC.

In the early 1940s, when she was living in Accokeek, Maryland, she married Robert Ware Straus, who was to play an integral role in the preservation of the view across the Potomac River from George Washington's home at Mount Vernon and the formation of the Moyaone Reserve. She maintained a studio at their Accokeek home. In 1968, she moved to Maine, where she was a student of zen teacher Walter Nowick at Moonspring Hermitage in Surry, which later became the Morgan Bay zendo. She was an active member of the Morgan Bay zendo, and several of her sculptures remain on its grounds.

In 1987, the University of Maine honored her with the Maryann Hartman Award, which recognizes distinguished women of Maine. Shortly after her death in 1988, the Lenore Thomas Straus Scholarship was established in her name at the Haystack Mountain School of Crafts, where Straus had taught as an artist-in-residence in 1984 and 1986 and plunged into the medium of handmade paper.

== Legacy ==
According to FBI files related to the House Un-American Activities Committee, Lenore Thomas Straus was investigated and admitted that she had joined the Communist Party while working for the government in 1935. Her stand on social justice, like that of her husband, leaned heavily on U.S. Communist affiliations. Her art focused on equality for immigrants, along with dignity, personal power, and respect for the working poor. Idealized collective beliefs about the social benefits of Communism were a visible constant for numerous other artists in the 1930s.

The annual campaign by President Franklin Roosevelt's office to reignite the Emergency Relief Appropriation Act of 1935 for almost a decade not only worked to lift the economic down-slope in the United States, but also changed career directions for numerous artists, especially women artists living and working in the 1930s and 1940s. For many, this was the first time women were able to make a viable and valuable living as both artist and creative.

It was not until 1952 that Lenore finally took on her youngest and longest-standing art apprentice, Sue Hoya Sellars. In 1953 Lenore met and recognized thirteen year old Sellars as a young and budding teenage artist with exceptional, yet publicly ignored, talent. Lenore Thomas Straus later became Sellars' legal guardian as well as her artistic mentor. Concepts in art outlining the importance of intentionality in creating art became an important creative focus for both Straus and Sellars within their lifetime as artists.

Today's modern movement in the use of art as 'Intentional Creativity' has more recently been taught by Sellars' artist daughter Shiloh Sophia McCloud. In June 2015 the Greenbelt Museum in Greenbelt, Maryland opened an exhibit of Lenore's work called "The Knowing Hands That Carve This Stone: The New Deal Art of Lenore Thomas Straus." This show highlights the work of Lenore Thomas Straus along with the work of Sue Hoya Sellars and Shiloh Sophia McCloud as a demonstration of art reaching the public from a continuing lineage of art and artists.

== Gallery ==
Garment Worker (1936), Roosevelt, New Jersey

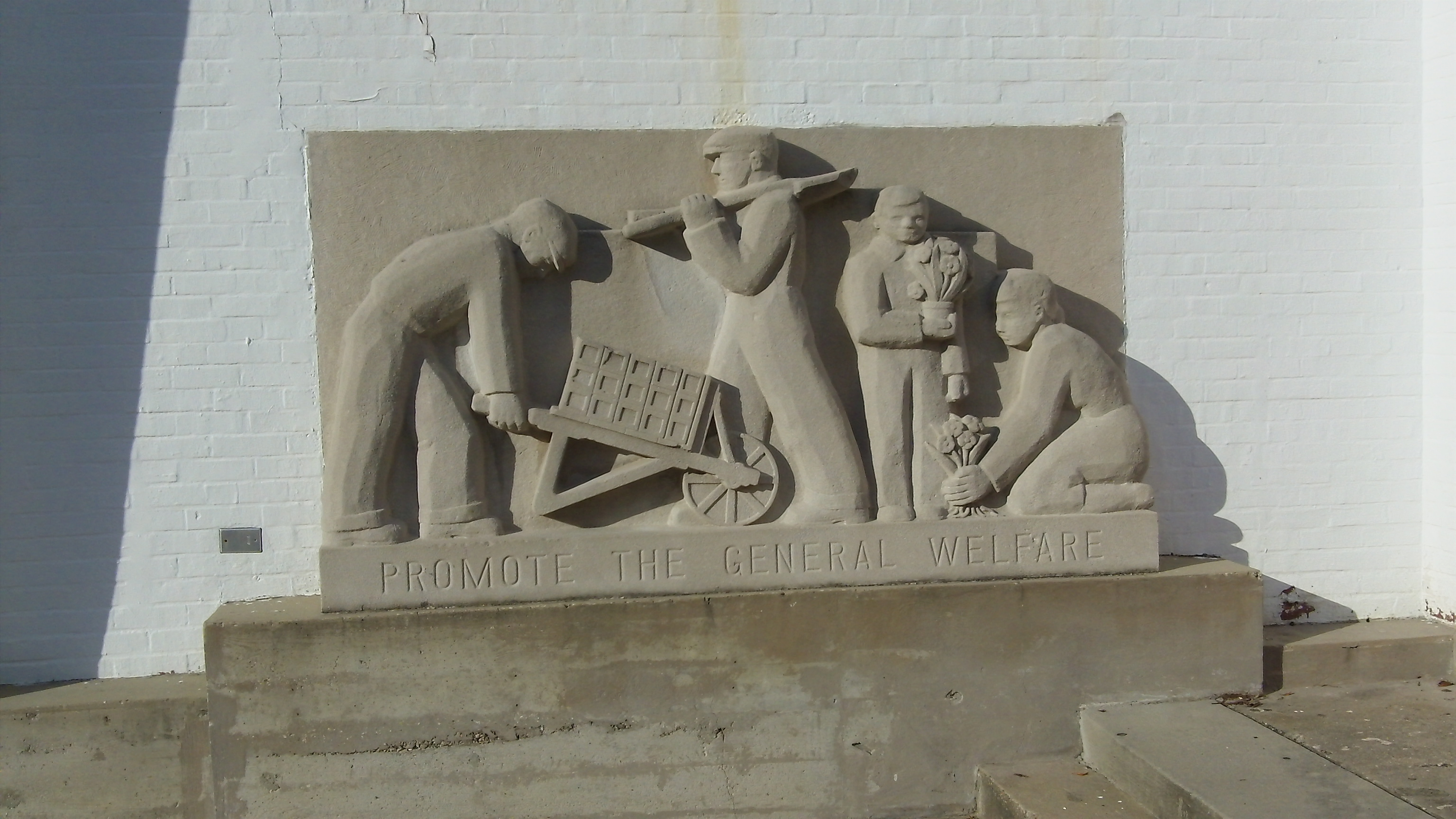
Greenbelt, Maryland bas relief "Promote the General Welfare"

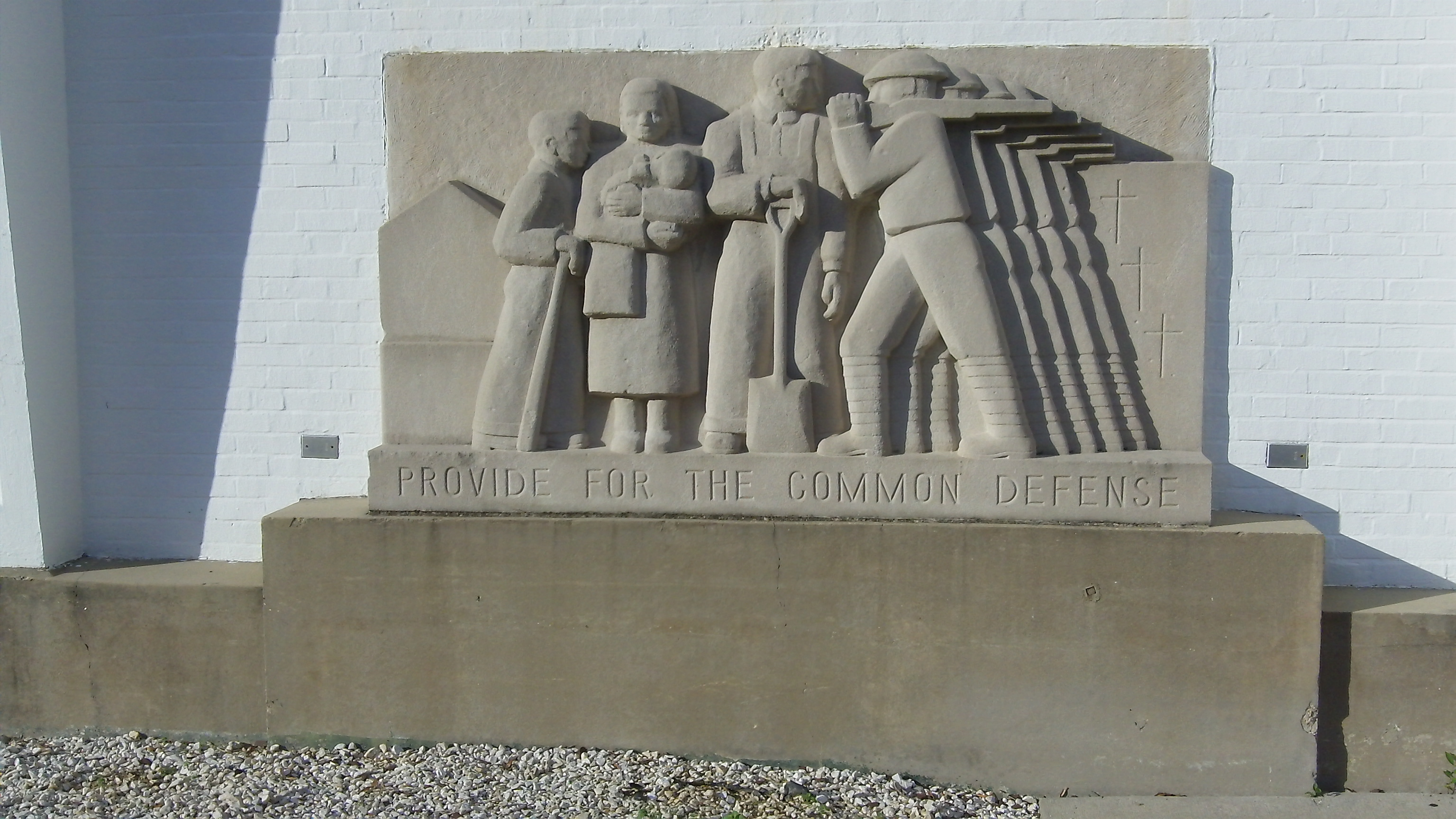
Greenbelt, Maryland bas relief "Provide for the Common Defense"

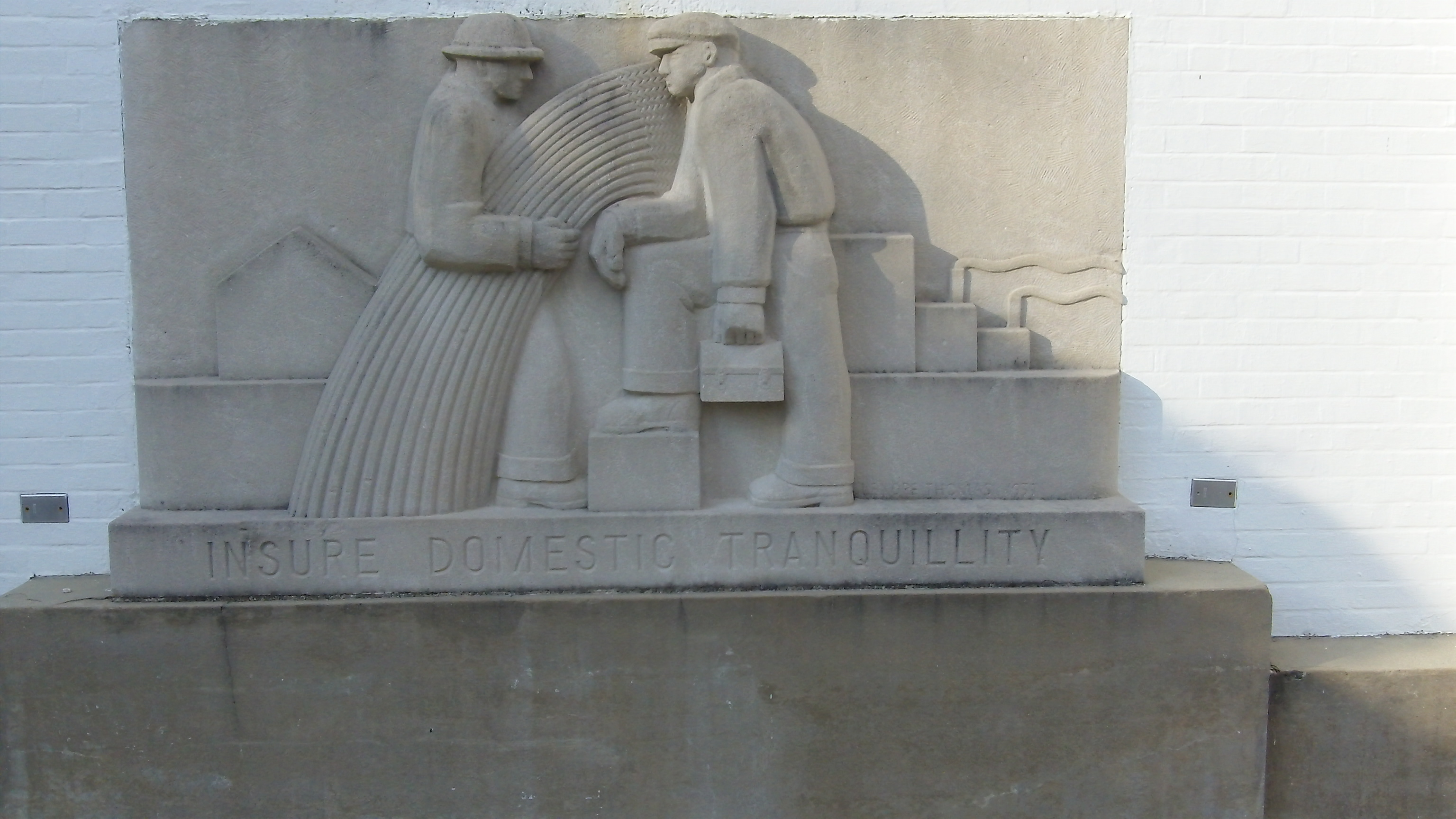
Greenbelt, Maryland bas relief "Insure Domestic Tranquility"

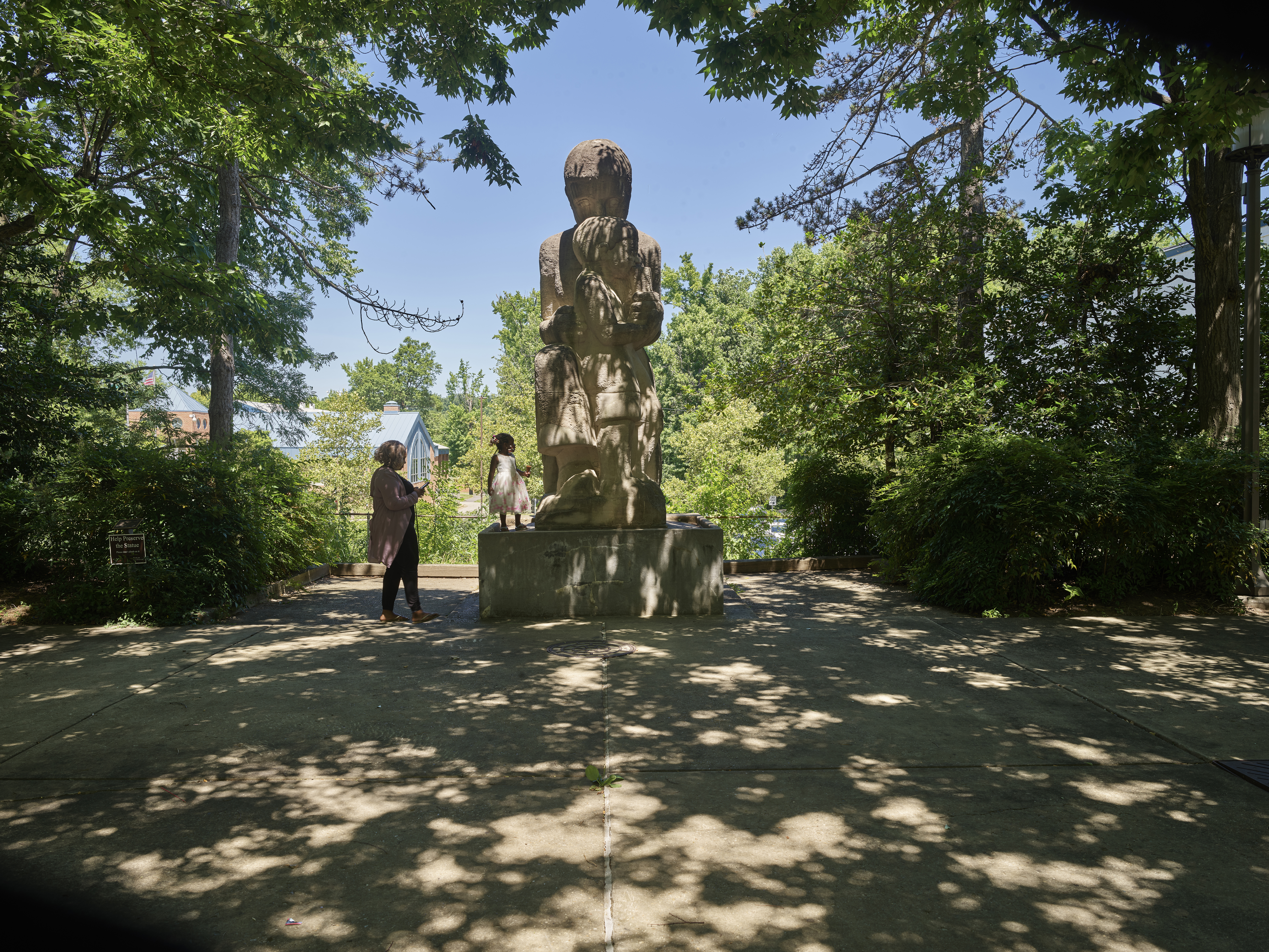
Mother and Child (1939), Greenbelt, Maryland

== List of selected works ==
c. 1927	Blue Rhinoceros	glazed brick	Alice Ferguson Foundation, Accokeek, Maryland
1936	Garment Worker	limestone	Roosevelt Public School, Roosevelt, New Jersey
1937	Preamble to the Constitution	limestone	Greenbelt Community Center, Greenbelt Maryland
1939	Delivery of Mail to the Farm	glazed terra cotta	Post office, Fredonia, Kansas
1939	Mother and Child	stone	Town center, Greenbelt, Maryland
1939	Rural Life		Post office, Covington, Virginia
1940	Frog	concrete	Langston Terrace playground, Washington, DC
1941	Industries and Agriculture of Leetonia	terra cotta relief	Post office, Leetonia, Ohio
1943	Springtime		Post office, Webster Springs, West Virginia
1967	The Fisherman's Wife		Vestvågøy, Lofoten, Norway
	Two Headed Sculpture		Blue Hill Public Library, Blue Hill, Maine
	Alice		Alice Ferguson Foundation, Accokeek, Maryland
	Henry		Alice Ferguson Foundation, Accokeek, Maryland

== Bibliography ==
- The Tender Stone (1964)
- Stone Dust: The Autobiography of a Stone Carving (1969)
