= Piscataway Indian Nation and Tayac Territory =

State-recognized tribe in Maryland, US

Piscataway Indian Nation Inc.
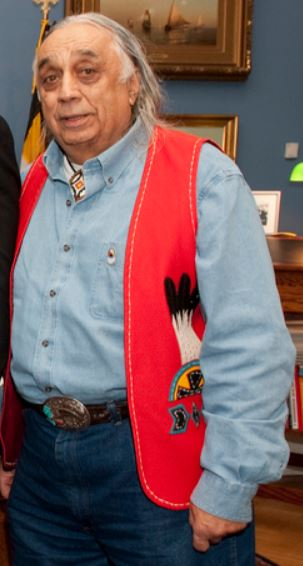
- Billy Tayac, hereditary chief of the Piscataway Indian Nation And Tayac Territory in 2012
- Type: 501(c)(3) organization
- Tax ID no.: 52-1272235
- Headquarters: Port Tobacco, Maryland
- Location: United States
- Members: 103
- Official language: English

The Piscataway Indian Nation (/pɪsˈkætəˌweɪ/ or /pɪskəˈtɑːwə/,), also called Piscataway Indian Nation Inc. is a state-recognized tribe in Maryland that identifies as the descendants of the historic Piscataway people. The Piscataway Indian Nation organized out of a 20th-century revival of the Piscataway people and culture. It is one of three contemporary organized groups of self-identified Piscataway descendants.

On January 12, 2012, Maryland Governor Martin O'Malley issued an Executive Order recognizing both the Piscataway Indian Nation and the Piscataway-Conoy Tribe of Maryland as Indian groups under a process established by the General Assembly. The Piscataway Indian Nation is not a federally recognized tribe.

== Geography ==
The Piscataway Indian Nation inhabits traditional Piscataway homelands in the areas of Charles County, Calvert County, and St. Mary's County; all in Maryland. Its members now mostly live in these three southern Maryland counties and in the two nearby major metropolitan areas, Baltimore and Washington, D.C.

== Government ==
The most recent hereditary chief of the Piscataway Indian Nation and Tayac Territory was the late Billy Redwing Tayac, prominent in the movement for Indigenous and human rights. He was the son of the late Chief Turkey Tayac, a leader in the Native American revitalization movements of the twentieth century. He died in September 2021.

Since Turkey Tayac's death in 1978, two other organized tribal groups have emerged that represent Piscataway people: these are the Piscataway Conoy Tribe, led by Mrs. Mervin Savoy; and the Cedarville Band of Piscataways, led by Natalie Proctor. The different tribes have varying perspectives on tribal membership, development, and other issues.

== History ==
According to some historians and archaeologists, a small group of Piscataway families continued to live in their homeland. Though destroyed as an independent, sovereign polity, the Piscataway survived, and resettled into rural farm life. In those times, they were classified as free people of color, over time marrying members of other ethnic groups, but incorporating them into some Piscataway traditions.

Phillip Sheridan Proctor, later known as Turkey Tayac, was born in 1895 in Charles County, Maryland. Proctor revived the use of the title, tayac, a hereditary office he claimed had been handed down through his family. Turkey Tayac was instrumental in the revival of American Indian cultures in the Mid-Atlantic and Southeast.

Chief Turkey Tayac was a prominent figure in the early and mid-twentieth century cultural revitalization movements. He influenced the Piscataway, but also other remnant southeastern American Indian communities, such as the Lumbee of North Carolina, and the Nanticoke, and Powhatan of Virginia and Maryland. With a third-grade formal education, Chief Turkey Tayac began the process of cultural revitalization and self-determination. He emphasized a movement based on American Indians choosing self-identification, during an era when the United States Indian Reorganization Act required individuals to prove blood quantum to claim their ancestry.

Today, the Piscataway Indian Nation is a state-recognized tribe in Maryland.

The Piscataway Indian Nation members are among the 25,000 self-identified Native Americans in Maryland.

== See also ==
- Alabama Cajans
  - MOWA Band of Choctaw Indians
- Brandywine people
- Brass Ankles
  - Wassamasaw Tribe of Varnertown Indians
- Delaware Moors
  - Lenape Indian Tribe of Delaware
  - Nanticoke Indian Association
  - Nanticoke Lenni-Lenape Tribal Nation
- Dominickers
- Lumbee
  - Lumbee Tribe of North Carolina
- Melungeon
  - Carmel Melungeons
- Powhatan Renape Nation
- Ramapough Mountain Indians
- Redbones

== Sources ==
- Barbour, Philip L. The Three Worlds of Captain John Smith. Boston: Houghton Mifflin Co., 1964.
- ______. ed. The Jamestown Voyages Under the First Charter, 1606-1609. 2 vols. The Hakluyt Society, 2nd series nos. 136-137. Cambridge, England, 1969.
- Chambers, Mary E. and Robert L. Humphrey. Ancient Washington—American Indian Cultures of the Potomac Valley. Washington, D.C., George Washington University, 1977.
- Goddard, Ives (1978). "Eastern Algonquian Languages". In Bruce Trigger (ed.), Handbook of North American Indians, Vol. 15 (Northeast). Washington, DC: Smithsonian Institution, pp. 70–77.
- Griffin, James B. "Eastern North American Prehistory: A Summary". Science 156 (1967):175-191.
- Hertzberg, Hazel. The Search for an American Indian Identity: Modern Pan Indian Movements. NY: Syracuse University Press, 1971.
- Merrell, James H. "Cultural Continuity Among the Piscataway Indians of Colonial Maryland". William & Mary Quarterly, 3rd series, 36 (1979): 548-70.
- Potter, Stephen R. Commoners, Tribute, and Chiefs: The Development of Algonquian Culture in the Potomac Valley. Charlottesville: University Press of Virginia, 1993.
