= Leeland Road station =

Rail station in Stafford, Virginia, U.S.

Leeland Road
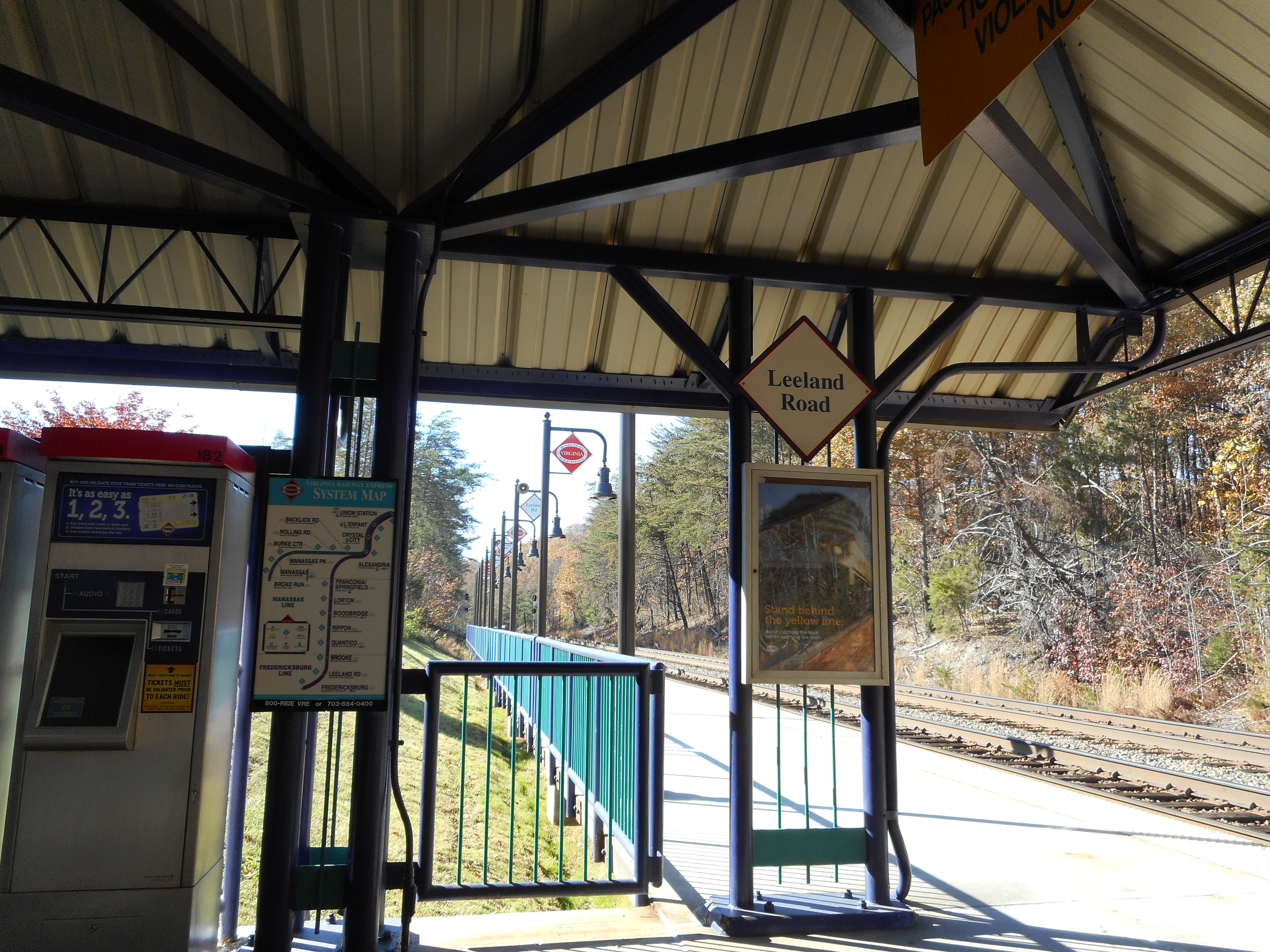
- Looking along the platform, facing Fredericksburg

General information
- Location: 275 Leeland Road; Stafford, VA; United States
- Coordinates: 38°20′49″N 77°26′16″W
- Owner: Virginia Railway Express
- Line: RF&P Subdivision (CSXT)
- Platforms: 1 side platform
- Tracks: 2

Construction
- Parking: 1,029 free spaces
- Cycle facilities: Bicycle rack
- Accessible: Yes

Other information
- Station code: LLR
- Fare zone: 8

History
- Opened: 1992

Services
Preceding station	Virginia Railway Express	Following station
Fredericksburg toward Spotsylvania	Fredericksburg Line	Brooke toward Union Station
Location

Leeland Road station is a Virginia Railway Express station located at 275 Leeland Road in Stafford, Virginia, although VRE states that its address is in Falmouth, Virginia. The station serves the Fredericksburg Line and shares the right-of-way with Amtrak's Northeast Regional, Silver Meteor, Silver Star, Palmetto, Auto Train, and Carolinian trains. However, no Amtrak trains stop here. The station is located next to the Leeland Station community, which was named after the VRE station. It is also next to Conway Elementary School.
