= Tré Seals =

American type designer (born 1993)

- Born: September 29, 1993 (age 32)
- Education: Stevenson University
- Known for: Type designer, creative director, graphic designer

Tré Seals (born September 29, 1993) is an American type designer, creative director, and typographer based in Accokeek, Maryland. He is the designer behind Vocal Type, a type foundry that develops fonts inspired by minority cultures and international protest movements. Seals is one of the few African-American type designers in the world.

== Early life and education ==
Seals’ parents ran a soil manufacturing business on a family farm outside of Washington, D.C. He graduated from Stevenson University with a degree in visual communication design.

Seals is a two-time childhood brain tumor survivor and credits his experiences with debilitating headaches early in life as a key motivation to pursue a career in art and design.

== Career ==
After initially getting his start as a freelance graphic designer and working for a staffing agency The Creative Group for a year and a half after graduating college, Seals established a brand studio called Seals and a type foundry Vocal Type.

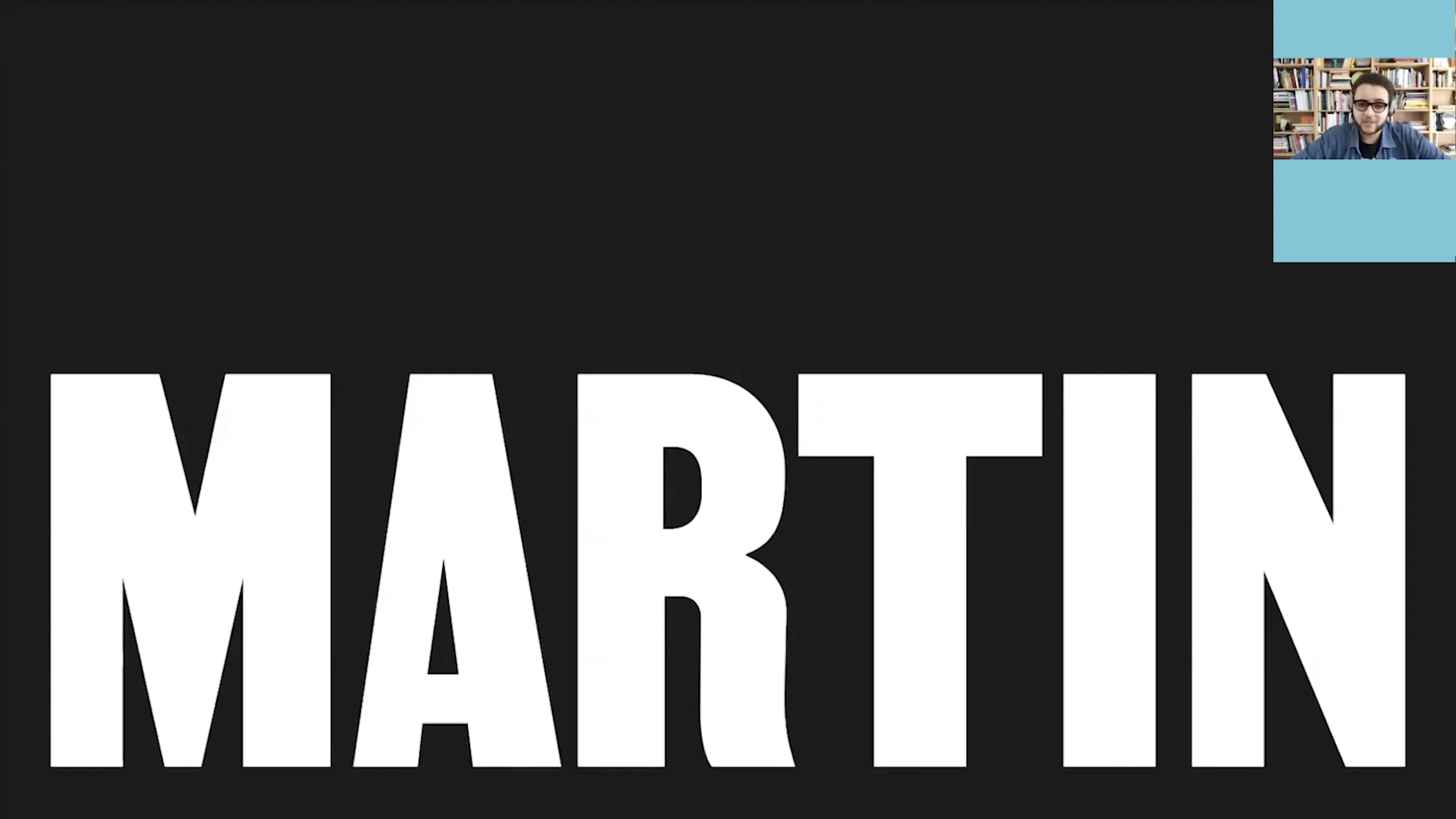
Tré Seals presenting a talk titled "Becoming Vocal" at the Typographics 2020 virtual conference, organized by the Cooper Union. The Vocal Type typeface VTC Martin, designed by Seals, is shown on the slide.

Vocal Type's first and most popular release, VTC Martin, named after Martin Luther King Jr., was directly inspired by the “I Am a Man” posters first used during the Memphis Sanitation Strike in 1968. After the rise of the Black Lives Matter movement in 2020, VTC Martin became a popular choice for signs, exhibitions, and murals connected with the movement, including the Black Lives Matter mural in Newark, New Jersey. Other typefaces released by Vocal Type reference graphics used in W. E. B. Du Bois data visualizations, 1989 Tiananmen Square protests, women's suffrage movement, 1963 March On Washington For Jobs and Freedom, and WWII anti-fascist Resistance flyers.

Seals’ other notable works include logotype for Stacey Abrams’s 2022 campaign for the governor of Georgia and design for Spike, a 2021 book about Spike Lee. He has also consulted on typography for Colin Kaepernick and the TIME magazine. He authored and designed a 2022 book Dream In Color: 30 Posters of Power by 30 Black Creatives.

== Awards and achievements ==
Seals is a winner of the ADC Young Guns 17 competition awarded by Art Directors Club. In 2021 he was named one of recipients of the Brooklyn Museum's inaugural Black Design Visionaries grant program awarded in partnership with Meta’s Instagram. He was also recognized as one of top designers under the age of 35 elevating the medium of typography by Type Directors Club in the Ascenders competition of 2018. A solo exhibit of his work titled "Characters: Type + Progress" was held at the Branch Museum of Design in Richmond in 2022–2023. Another solo exhibition titled "Characters: Type in Action" was held at The Museum of Design Atlanta (MODA) in 2024–2025.
