= Brooke, Virginia =

Unincorporated community in Virginia, US

Coordinates: 38°23′15″N 77°22′47″W

Brooke is an unincorporated community in Stafford County, Virginia, United States.

Brooke is the site of the Andrew Chapel United Methodist Church and Cemetery, and a Virginia Railway Express commuter rail station. Near the VRE station is the Stafford Civil War Park, that was established in April 2013. Along the shores of the Potomac River's Aquia Creek is the Crow's Nest Natural Area Preserve and the Aquia Landing Park. The ZIP Code for Brooke is 22430.

The nearby Potomac Creek, 44ST2 was listed on the National Register of Historic Places in 1973.
