= Brooke station =

Virginia Railway Express station in Stafford, Virginia

Brooke
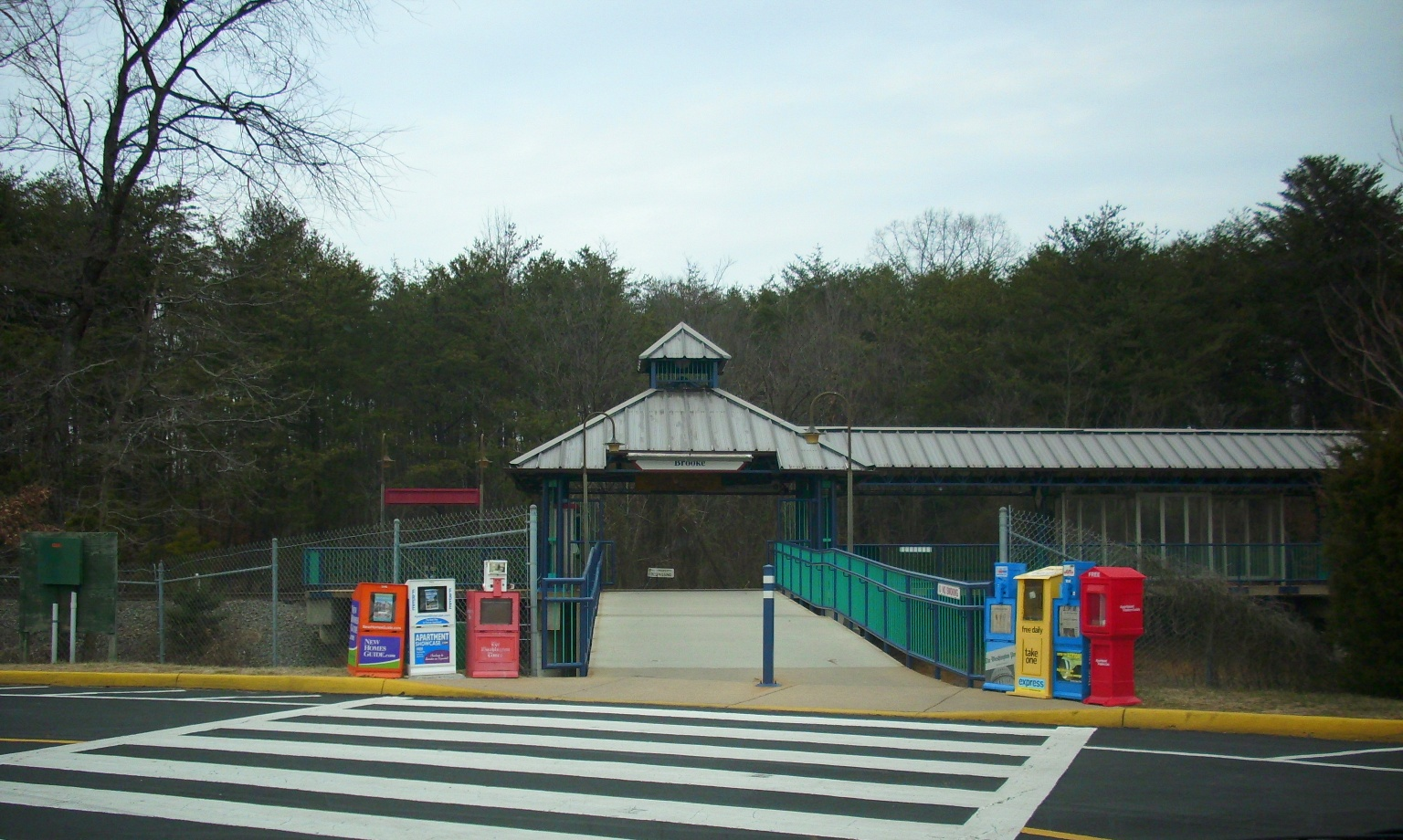
- Brooke station in January 2009

General information
- Location: 1721 Brooke Road; Brooke, Virginia; United States
- Coordinates: 38°23′14″N 77°22′54″W
- Owner: Virginia Railway Express
- Line: RF&P Subdivision (CSXT)
- Platforms: 1 side platform
- Tracks: 2

Construction
- Parking: 499 spaces
- Accessible: Yes

Other information
- Station code: BKV
- Fare zone: 8

History
- Opened: 1992

Services
Preceding station	Virginia Railway Express	Following station
Leeland Road toward Spotsylvania	Fredericksburg Line	Quantico toward Union Station
Former services
Preceding station	Richmond, Fredericksburg and Potomac Railroad	Following station
Fredericksburg toward Richmond: Broad Street or Main Street	Main Line	Arkendale toward Washington, D.C.
Location

Brooke station is a Virginia Railway Express station located at 1721 Brooke Road in Brooke near Stafford, Virginia. Free parking is available and located on a hill leading from the road. The station serves the Fredericksburg Line and shares the right-of-way with Amtrak's Northeast Regional, Silver Meteor, Silver Star, Auto Train, Palmetto, and Carolinian trains; however, no Amtrak trains stop here.
