= Chatham Heights, Virginia =

- Unincorporated community
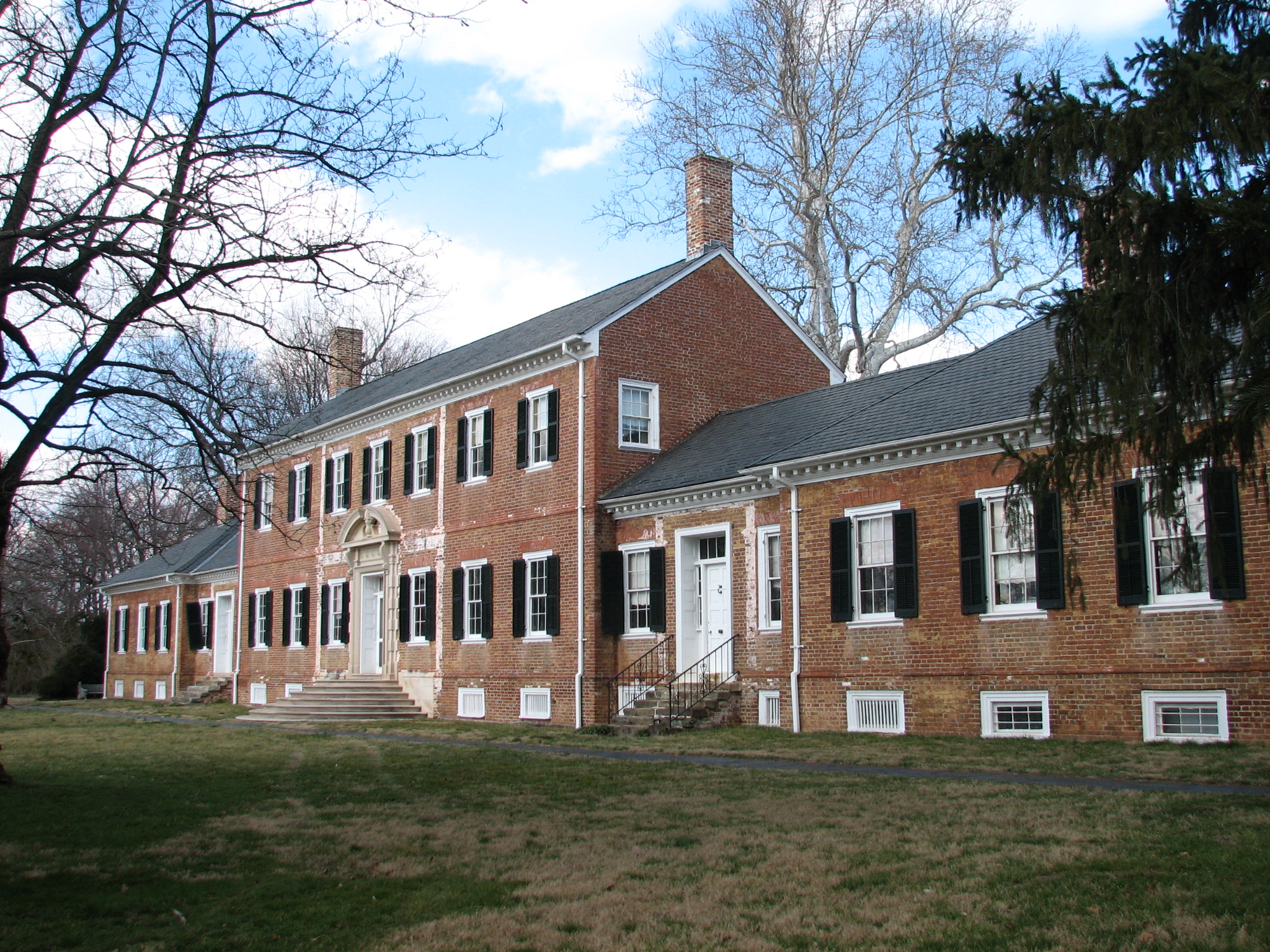
- Chatham Manor

- Location within Virginia Location within the United States
- Country: United States
- State: Virginia
- County: Stafford
- Elevation: 89 ft (27 m)
- Time zone: UTC−5 (Eastern (EST))
  - Summer (DST): UTC−4 (EDT)
- Area code: 540
- GNIS feature ID: 1494872

Chatham Heights is an unincorporated community in Stafford County, in the U.S. state of Virginia.

== Geography ==
Chatham Heights is located 89 ft (27 m) above sea level along the Rappahannock River, east of the city of Fredericksburg and southeast of the census-designated place of Falmouth.

== Transportation ==
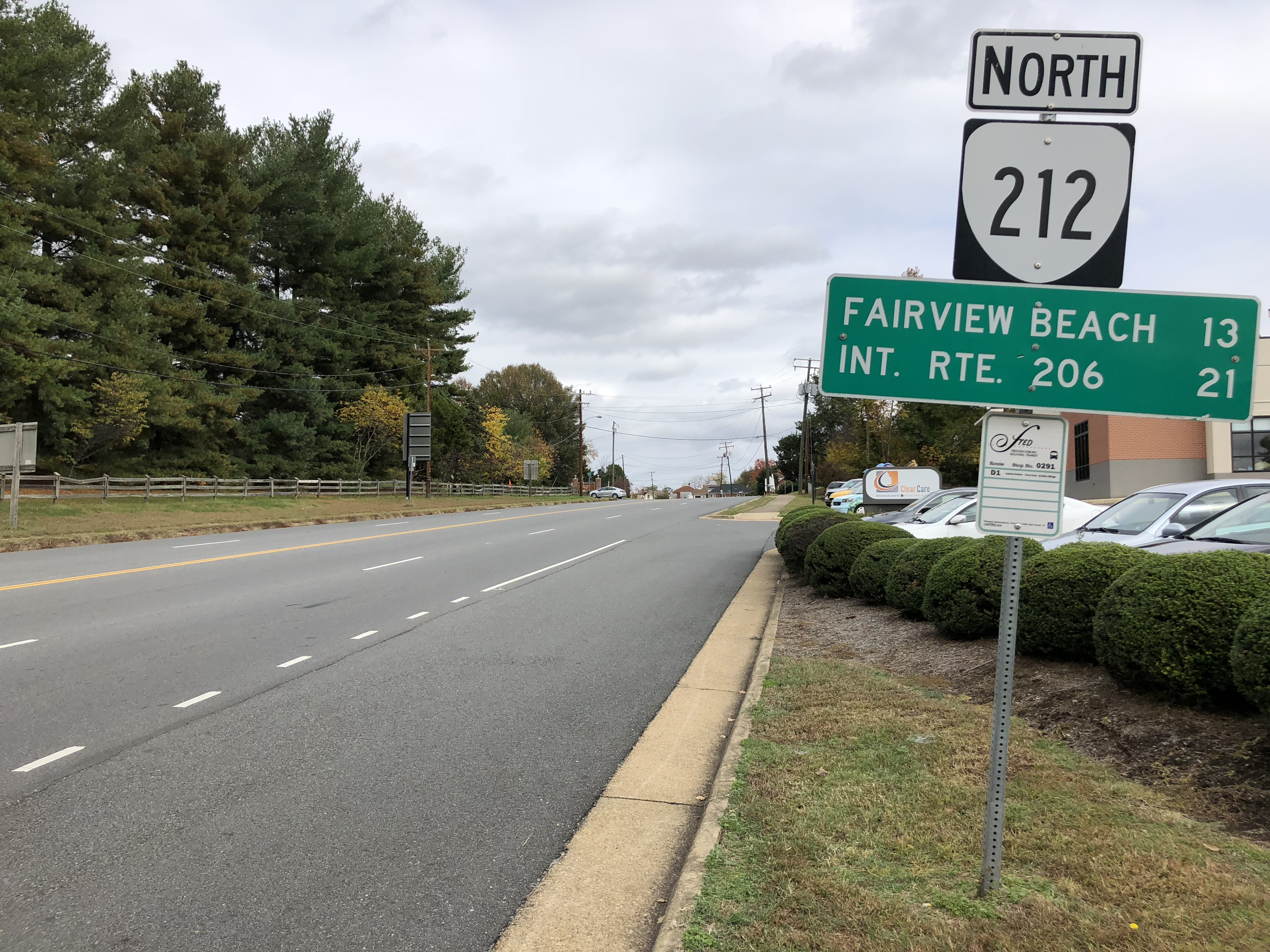
Virginia State Route 212 (Chatham Heights Road)

Chatham Heights is bisected by Virginia State Route 212 (Chatham Heights Road), which passes north–south through the community. The community also served by Virginia State Route 218 (which connects the community to U.S. Route 1) in the north and Virginia Route 3 Business in the south.

Fredericksburg Regional Transit provides its FRED bus service in the community. The RF&P Subdivision passes east of the community, and Fredericksburg station across the Rappahannock River provides access to Amtrak and Virginia Railway Express services.
