= Piscataway-Conoy Tribe of Maryland =

State-recognized tribe and non-profit organization based in Maryland

The Official Piscataway Conoy Tribe of Maryland Inc.
- Type: 501(c)(3) organization
- Tax ID no.: 46-2190498
- Headquarters: Bryans Road, Maryland
- Location: United States
- Official language: English

The Piscataway-Conoy Tribe of Maryland is a Native American tribe recognized by the state of Maryland. They identify as descendants of the Piscataway people. It is one of two state-recognized Piscataway tribes in Maryland, along with the Piscataway Indian Nation and Tayac Territory. Neither is a federally recognized tribe.

== History ==
Prior to European contact, the Piscataway tribe was a part of a confederacy of tribes occupying the areas between the Chesapeake Bay and the Potomac River watershed. The tribe's traditional territory included present-day Charles, Prince George's, St. Mary's, and Baltimore counties, as well as the foothills of the Appalachians. The Piscataway were some of the first Native Americans to make contact with European settlers. Colonial expansion led to a 1666 treaty between tribal leadership and Lord Baltimore, resulting in the establishment of a reservation called the Piscataway Manor. During this time many Piscataway people converted to Catholicism. To escape persecution by settler society, some of the Piscataway migrated to settlements along the Susquehanna River into Virginia and Pennsylvania, where the Haudenosaunee gave them the name 'Conoy'.

== 20th–21st centuries ==
In 1995, the Piscataway Conoy Tribe began petitioning for formal state recognition as a tribe. The Piscataway Conoy tribe, along with the Piscataway Indian Nation, were recognized by the Governor of Maryland Martin O'Malley on January 9, 2012. The Executive Order granted Maryland Indian status but did not affect rights to land or gaming rights. As part of the negotiation for state recognition, the Piscataway Conoy tribe renounced any plans to open casinos. In 2021, St. Mary's College of Maryland launched an initiative to acknowledge the land on which the College sits as the ancestral home of the Yacocomico and Piscataway Peoples. In November 2021, the University of Maryland announced the name of its new dining hall would be Yahentamitsi in honor of the state’s Piscataway Conoy Tribe.

=== Notable members ===
- Caleb Williams, NFL quarterback

== See also ==
- Alabama Cajans
  - MOWA Band of Choctaw Indians
- Brandywine people
- Brass Ankles
  - Wassamasaw Tribe of Varnertown Indians
- Delaware Moors
  - Lenape Indian Tribe of Delaware
  - Nanticoke Indian Association
  - Nanticoke Lenni-Lenape Tribal Nation
- Dominickers
- Lumbee
  - Lumbee Tribe of North Carolina
- Melungeon
  - Carmel Melungeons
- Powhatan Renape Nation
- Ramapough Mountain Indians
- Redbones
