= Hard Bargain Farm =

- U.S. National Register of Historic Places
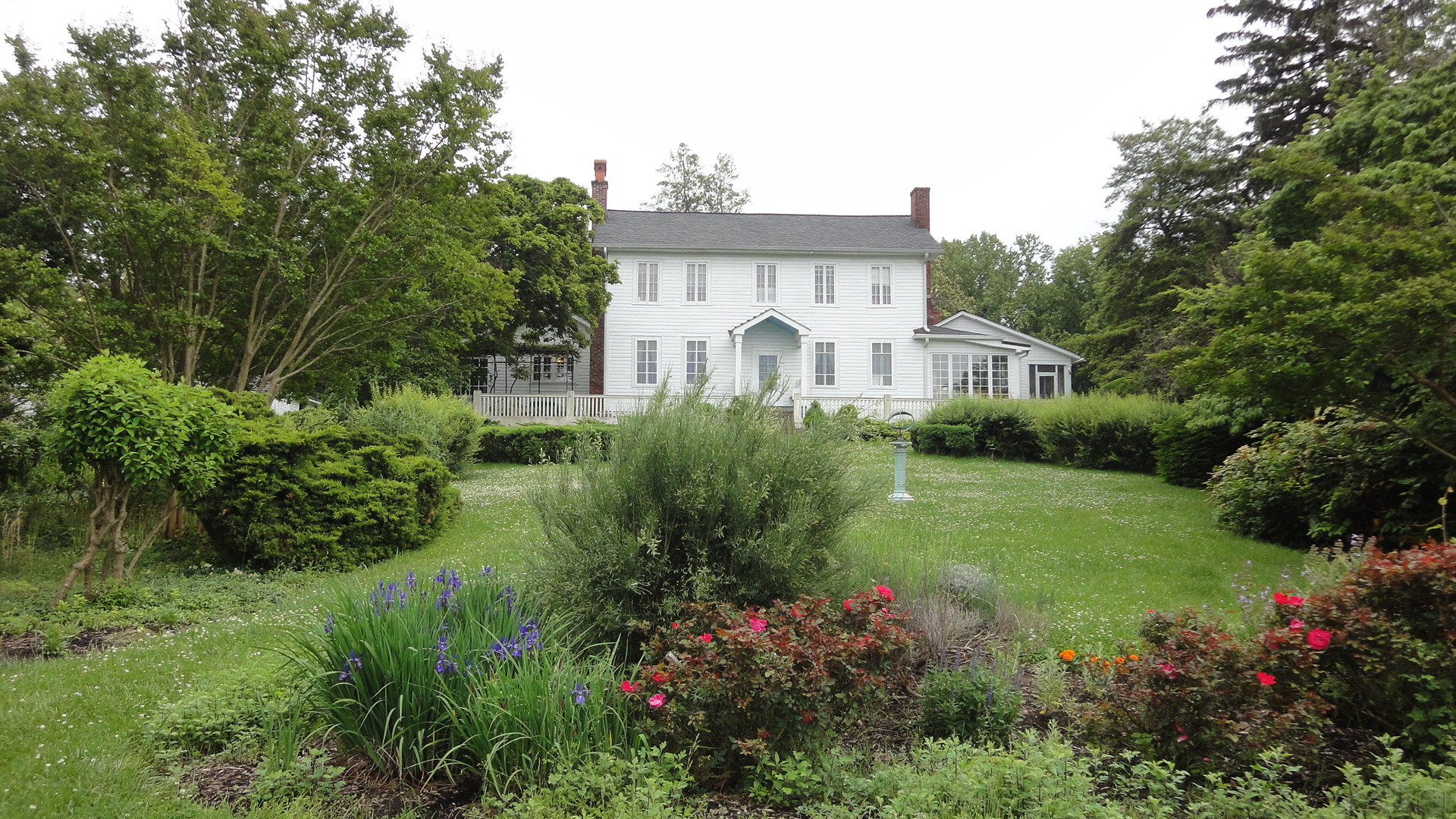
- House and garden at Hard Bargain Farm, May 2012

- Location within Maryland Location within the United States
- Location: 2001 Bryan Point Road, Accokeek, Maryland
- Coordinates: 38°41′21″N 77°2′41″W
- Built: 1922
- Architect: Alice Ferguson
- NRHP reference No.: 14000839
- Added to NRHP: October 8, 2014

Hard Bargain Farm is the former country estate and working farm of Alice and Henry G. Ferguson. It is located at 2001 Bryan Point Road in Accokeek, Maryland, overlooking the Potomac River. The property, now a smaller portion of the 330 acres (130 ha) they purchased, was developed by them into a "country garden". Alice Ferguson, an artist, produced a significant body of her work here, and oversaw both the operations of the farm they established, and studied the prehistoric archaeological remains found on the property. (The Accokeek Creek Site, now in Piscataway Park on land donated by the Fergusons, was first studied by her.) The Fergusons established the Ferguson Foundation in 1954 to manage the property. The foundation operates the property as an educational center focused on land stewardship and historical farming practices in the region. The property includes a heavy timber frame tobacco barn originally constructed between about 1830 and 1850, and rebuilt in the post-American Civil War era. Popular events include the annual Pinot on the Potomac fundraiser, and the annual Potomac River litter cleanups.

Hard Bargain Farm was listed on the National Register of Historic Places in 2014.

== See also ==
- National Register of Historic Places listings in Prince George's County, Maryland
