= Potomac Creek, 44ST2 =

Archaeological site in Virginia, United States

- Potomac Creek Site
- U.S. National Register of Historic Places
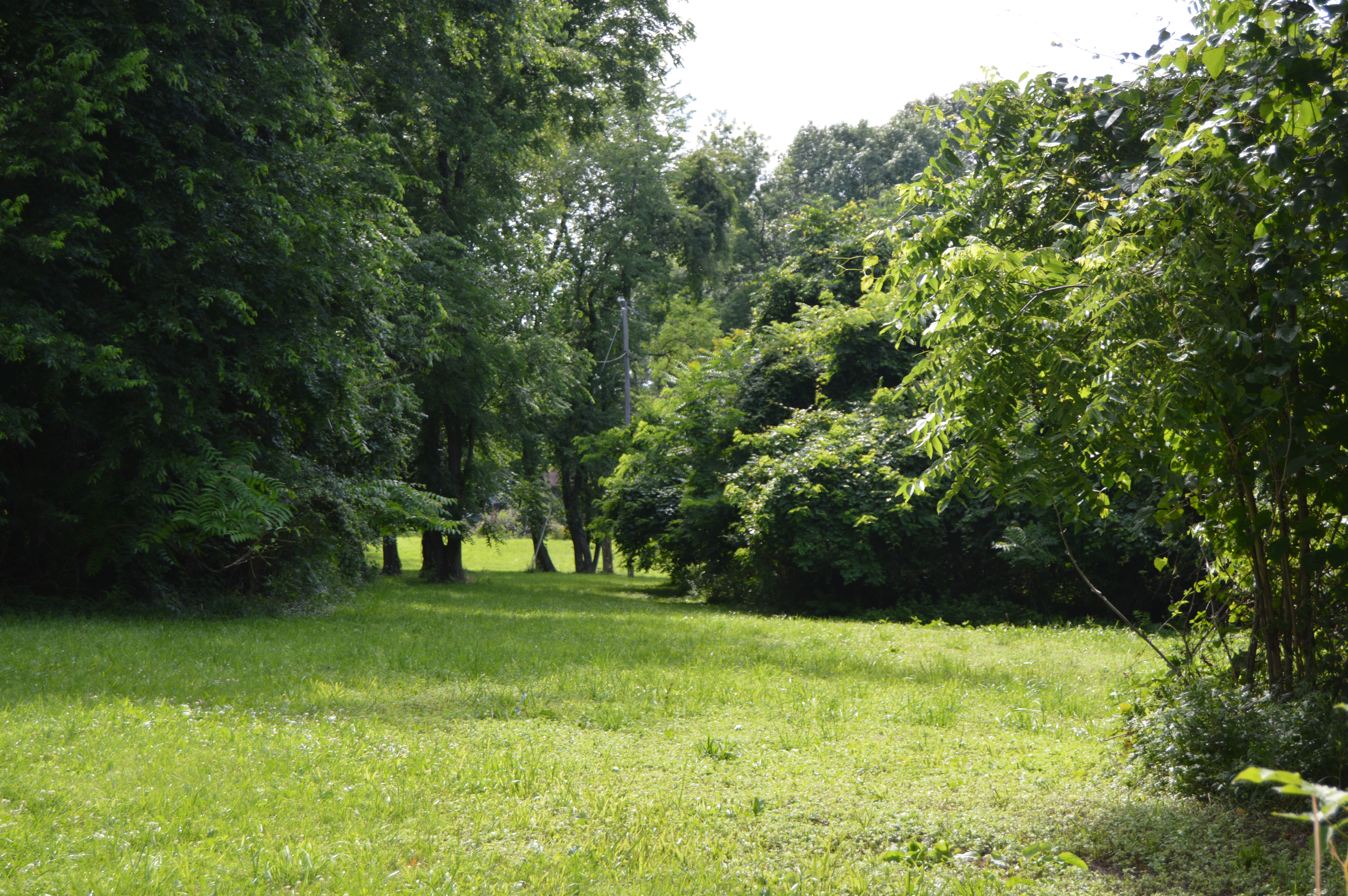
- Site overview

- Location within Northern Virginia Location within Virginia Location within the United States
- Nearest city: Brooke, Virginia
- Area: 0 acres (0 ha)
- NRHP reference No.: 69000281
- Added to NRHP: December 3, 1969

Potomac Creek, or 44ST2, is a late Native American village located on the Potomac River in Stafford County, Virginia. It is from the Woodland Period and dates from 1300 to 1550. There is another Potomac Creek site, 44ST1 or Indian Point, which was occupied by the Patawomeck during the historic period and is where Captain John Smith visited. This site no longer exists, as it eroded away into the river. Site 44ST2 has five ossuaries, one individual burial, and one multiple burial. Other names for the site are Potowemeke and Patawomeke. The defining features include distinctive ceramics, ossuary burials, and palisade villages.

== Site Description ==
Occupation at Potomac Creek can be split into three stages entitled "Uncomfortable Immigrants", "A Flourishing Tidewater Culture", and "Maturity and Change" and describe the cultural transformation that occurred. These people were anxious to defend their cultural distinctiveness and their territory from neighbors and built a compact, well-fortified village.

=== Stage One ===
The site's original occupation is radiocarbon dated to around 1300 AD. From architectural remains it is seen that the village was fortified by a wall and also a ditch or moat indicating protection was a concern for these people. The earliest part of the village appears to be the outmost palisade wall that goes around the entire perimeter. There are multiple bastions on this outside wall. Evidence shows there were multiple palisade walls. These are believed to have occurred in sets to form a more imposing barrier and to create complex entryways. The outside diameter of the village was about 85 meters and had interior of about 5,675 m². The estimated maximum number that could comfortably reside within the full interior is roughly 250-300 persons.

=== Stage Two ===
This stage of the village began in AD 1400 and lasted until ca. 1560. The size of the enclosed area decreased during this time. The size of the enclosed space was 74 meters in diameter, with an overall interior space of 4,300 m². It seems that the site did not serve as a residence for many people any longer but had a specific purpose. The lack of bastions and ditch reinforcement probably signals a relaxation of defensive concerns. Ossuary 2 is southeast of the structure in the village and could date to this stage. A building in the center of the complex is believed to be the principal structure at this time. Ossuaries 3 and 5 are adjacent to this structure and are also interpreted as part of this period of use.

=== Stage Three ===
This stage, dating from AD 1560 to 1650, involves the abandonment of site 44ST2 and the beginning of 44ST1. The use of 44ST2 was no longer for general or specialized habitation but for ossuary burial. Ossuaries 1 and 4 date from this time. The cultural material found at 44ST1 was similar to what was found at 44ST2, just with a greater concentration of European trade items.

=== Multiple Burial ===
This burial was found on December 1, 1935 in a corn field on the site of Indian Village at Potomac Creek. The pit was rounded and the remains found were 2 to 2 ½ feet deep with ten skeletons. All of the skeletons were found within a five-foot square but were buried separately, at different times. There were many beads everywhere that were mostly small shell disks and some red, blue, and green glass. This burial contained both adults and children. The large amount of European artifacts indicates that the burial date was either in the last part of the town's occupancy or after its abandonment.

=== Individual Burial ===
On May 16, 1937 bones were found in a test pit about 110 feet from the second ossuary. The bones were not fully exposed until September 9. It was thought to be another ossuary but turned out to be one human skeleton, a young adult male. The skeleton was incomplete and some parts had been burned. Part of a dog skeleton was found in the burial. There is no description of these bones, making them seem unimportant. Judge Graham, the archaeologist working there at the time, thought this grave was not significant and did not do much analysis on the skeletons found inside it.

=== Ossuary 1 ===
The first ossuary was found on March 21, 1936 and was discovered because of bones that were seen around a groundhog hole. This site was 100 feet northeast of the multiple burial. Archaeologists believe there were 181 skeletons in this ossuary and work continued at this site for over a year, until April 1937. It was oval shaped, 37 ½ feet long, fifteen feet across, and five feet deep. A characteristic specific to this ossuary was its segmentation; the groups of skeletons were separated by layers of dirt. Men, women, and children of a variety of ages were found. The skeletons found were not all laid out flat, there were secondary burials, which are bundles of disarticulated bones. Burnt bones were also found in three different points. One skull was filled with soft yellow sand, which is not common to the area, meaning it was filled by hand or formerly buried. There was a large quantity of European objects, like copper and glass. Other European objects found were a pair of scissors, two hand-wrought iron nails, a piece of scrap iron, and three pieces of glazed tile. Shell beads were the most common native artifact. The beads were mostly associated with the skeletons of children. There were also pipes, shell gorgets, and potsherds.

=== Ossuary 2 ===
This part of the site was discovered on November 28, 1936. It was roughly oval and had dimensions of 38 feet long, eleven feet wide, and four feet deep. The estimated amount of skeletons was 287. These bones were in better condition than the ones in the first ossuary and were of both sexes and all ages. The bones were closely and continuously intermingled, making them harder to remove. Two distinctive traits of this ossuary are that it did not have any European origin artifacts and only three copper items were found. These copper pieces were proved through testing to be of native origin. This means that it was pure metal, not enhanced by anything like iron, lead, or tin. There was an abundance of shell beads that were native manufactured. Beads were more commonly found with children's skeletons. There were also large beads spread on the floor of the burial. It is thought that these beads might have been scattered there before the burial. Other artifacts found were potsherds, clay pipes (a few whole), quartz arrowheads, scrapers, pieces of hematite, and broken animal, bird, and fish bones.

=== Ossuary 3 ===
This ossuary was found on May 17, 1937; the day after the individual burial was discovered. It contained 67 skeletons and was about 77 feet from the second ossuary. The bodies found were male and female and consisted of all age groups. The excavation for it was finished by September 17. The shape was egg-shaped and the dimensions were 18 feet long, 11 feet wide, and three and a half feet deep. The bodies were not piled on top of one another but laid side by side. No European artifacts were found in this ossuary, as in Ossuary 2. A difference from Ossuary 2 is that there were few native made artifacts present, beyond low amounts of small shell beads, some bone awls, parts of worked deer antlers, broken animal bones, and broken pottery sherds.

=== Ossuary 4 ===
The size of this ossuary was 23 feet long, 13 feet wide, and three feet deep. An estimated 41 skeletons were in this ossuary and the bones were poorly preserved. There were no European objects and few that were Indian made. The artifacts found were eight sherds, a small piece of undecorated pipestem, and a baked clay ball. There were no burnt bones noted. None of these bones were kept to do further study on.

=== Ossuary 5 ===
On July 12, 1939 excavation started on this ossuary and ended July 24 of the same year. The depth from the base of the topsoil was about three feet. In the other ossuaries and burials the bones had been taken out from a side of a vertical cut, in this ossuary the archaeologist (T. Dale Stewart) worked down and exposed the upper surfaces before removing them. This permitted a better observation of the arrangement of skeletons. All the skeletons were laid in no particular direction. An unusual thing about this ossuary is that some of the skeletons had their lower legs bent unnaturally forward at the knee. There were 135 skeletons, 63 adult and 72 children. The archaeologist determined 34 of the adults to be male, 27 to be female, and two he was unsure of. Shell beads were the most common artifact. In one skull a lot of different kinds of beads were found and this is evidence of secondary burial. There was more evidence of secondary burial because of burnt bones. An unusual artifact was a three-foot piece of pine heartwood. This was on top of the bones on the north side. It is thought that the wood was used to carry the bodies to the pit and then put in afterwards. The wood could also be a type of burial structure or something ceremonial. The discovery of mud dauber nests with some of the skeletons supports the interpretation that these were secondary burials. Mud daubers do not build their nests underground showing that the remains were left above ground while they decomposed and were then buried.

== Artifacts ==
=== Ceramics ===
There are two main types of ceramics associated with this site, Potomac Creek Cord-impressed and Potomac Creek Sand-tempered. A smoothed variety of the Cord-impressed is named Potomac Creek Plain. These three types of ceramic are what the dishes and containers were made of by the people of 44ST2. Other ceramic artifacts consist of ladles/spoons, beads, worked potsherds, and human effigy figurines. Many of the beads came from several of the ossuaries but also just in general context around the site. Three pottery human effigy figurine heads were found, two with distinct facial features. A similar ceramic head has been found at the Kiser site in Virginia.

=== Tobacco Pipes ===
The collection of tobacco pipes included 15 complete clay pipes, 161 fragmentary pipes, two steatite pipes, and a bowl of another. The coloring of the clay pipes is from tan through dark brown to grayish black. Most of the pipes had a polish on them that can still be seen, despite weathering damage. This polish would completely obscure the paste texture of the pipe. The most common decoration on these pipes was one that resembled rouletting and was probably made by a small stamp. There are many sites in the surrounding area that have pipes very similar to the ones found at Potomac Creek. Port Tobacco, Maryland, Moyaone, Pamunkey Reservation, and Keyser Farm Site all have similar to identical pipes as Potomac Creek.

=== Lithics ===
Stone artifacts were found in both excavation and surface context. A total of 191 projectile points were found with another 25 that were broken or unclassifiable. The points are assigned to cultural periods from the Early Archaic to the Late Woodland. The majority of the stone tools were made from quartz or quartzite, which would have been obtained locally. Some points were made from rhyolite, chert, of Harper's Ferry quartzite. These types of materials would have been gathered elsewhere and brought back.

== Theories of Where the People Came From ==
1) Archaeologists vigorously debate the geographical origins of this culture. Some argue that it was an intrusive culture that came from the north; others for a strong Eastern Shore influence; others that the movement was mostly from the Piedmont to the inner coastal plain; and others that it was a largely in situ development.

2) It is thought that the ancestors of Potomac Creek, and other native complexes similar to it, came from southeastern New York, northeastern Pennsylvania, and northwestern New Jersey.

== What Was Learned ==
1) The appearance of fortified and planned villages around 1300 and later implies a growth of settlement patterns stimulated by population growth, changing political conditions, and economic strategies. Eight radiocarbon dates on carbonized wood were taken from different features and have established that the site was occupied between AD 1300 and 1550. The latest dates tell that this particular village was not inhabited during the post-contact period, and that the neighboring village site (44ST1) had replaced it by then.

2) The fortified nature of this village indicates that it was a principal place of residence. It is distinguished from ordinary settlements by the fortifications.

3) The Potomac Creek site (44ST2) is situated on a relatively high, defensible bluff above the creek of the same name. Located in Stafford County, Virginia, on the south shore of the Potomac River, "Potowomeke" was an important ceremonial place for centuries. The site was likely first occupied by Owasco immigrants ca. 1300 AD and was abandoned ca. 1550 AD, prior to European contact. The site has been a focus of archaeological interest since the 1930s.

4) The site derives particular significance from the presence of multiple palisade lines erected at different times during the site's approximately 250 year occupation. The site and the people who built and lived there are considered by some archaeologists as intrusive, migrants from the Piedmont who were pushed into the inner Coastal Plain by still more migrants from further west. The Potomac Creek site offers an important opportunity to examine Native life in the Potomac valley on the eve of European contact.

5) Although the precise function of the site has not been conclusively established, the presence of palisades and trenches are indicative of a place of importance for the inhabitants. At the very least, it is distinguished from ordinary settlements by the fortifications. The fortified nature of this village indicates that it was the principal place of residence for the local weroance or leader.

6) The physical geography of the site at the confluence of navigable waterways made it a conducive location for trading. Potter (1993) suggests that the Potomac were agents of trade for the area and that sites like this one were also pivotal "centers" in the regulation of goods.

7) As such, the site might well have contained one or more storehouses for keeping trade material. Extensive stone artifacts indicate a hearth of stone tool crafting. The discovery of arrowheads and stone implements indicate it may have served as a production center. The large number of ceramic fragments and pottery pieces as well as faunal/floral remains found at the site may support the idea that this site housed storehouses and served as a trading post during periods of its occupation.

8) Other physical evidence suggests that the site might have served a "special" purpose more than it did a principal settlement for a significant segment of the local population. This evidence is the relatively small size of the enclosed area and the general lack of clear house patterns. The discovery of clay pipe fragments at the site further suggests the special significance of the site, as tobacco use was often communal and privileged activity that supports the idea that the site held some ceremonial significance.

== See also ==
- Patawomeck

== Selected publications ==
- MacCord, Howard (1966) Miniature Human Effigy Heads in Virginia, Part I. Quarterly Bulletin of the Archaeological Society of Virginia, 20(3).
- MacCord, Howard (1992) The Potomac Indians: A Brief Culture History. Quarterly Bulletin of the Archeological Society of Virginia 47(2):71 B84
- Potter, Stephen R. Commoners, Tribute, and Chiefs: the Development of Algonquian Culture in the Potomac Valley. Charlottesville: University of Virginia, 1993.
- Rice, James D. Nature and History in the Potomac Country: From Hunter-Gatherers to the Age of Jefferson. Baltimore: Johns Hopkins University Press, 2009.
- Schmitt, Karl (1965) Patawomeke: An Historic Algonkian Site, Quarterly Bulletin of the Archeological Society of Virginia 20:1 B56.
- Stewart, Thomas Dale. Archeological Exploration of Patawomeke the Indian Town Site (44St2), Ancestral to the One (44St1) Visited in 1608 by Captain John Smith. Washington: Smithsonian Institution, 1992.
