= Bellevue (Accokeek, Maryland) =

Historic house in Maryland

- U.S. National Register of Historic Places
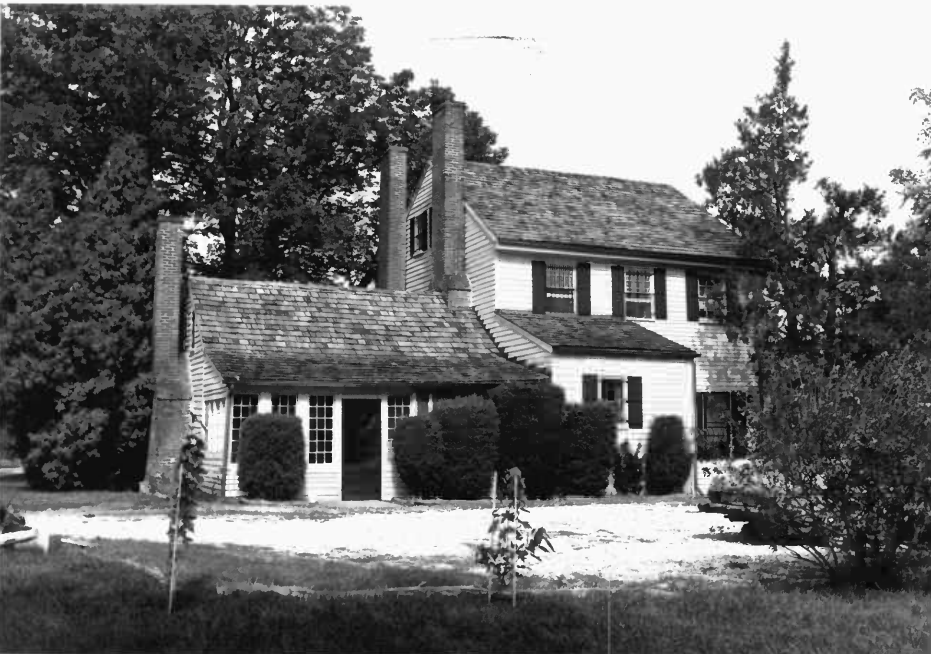

- Location within Maryland Location within the United States
- Location: 315 Farmhouse Road (formerly 200 Manning Road East), Accokeek, Maryland
- Coordinates: 38°39′41″N 77°0′5″W
- Built: 1840
- NRHP reference No.: 86001738
- Added to NRHP: August 21, 1986

Bellevue is a historic plantation house located at 200 Manning Road East, in Accokeek, Prince George's County, Maryland, United States. This Greek Revival style home was constructed in about 1840. It is one of only three surviving examples in Prince George's County of the once-popular Tidewater house style, typical of successful small plantations of that period. Bellevue is in excellent condition, and retains its freestanding chimneys with brick pent, as well as a roughly contemporary kitchen wing. The house stands on a five-acre, partially wooded lot which exemplifies its original plantation setting.

Bellevue was listed on the National Register of Historic Places in 1986.
