= Dominickers =

Biracial ethnic group from Holmes County, Florida

- Teacher and Dominicker students at Mt. Zion School, c. 1905-1910.

Total population
- 1950 (census): 60

Regions with significant populations
- United States Florida; Near Ponce de Leon in Holmes County, within the Florida Panhandle.

Languages
- Southern American English

Religion
- Christianity (Protestantism)

Related ethnic groups
- African-Americans, Alabama Cajans, Beaver Creek Indians, Brandywine people, Brass Ankles, Carmelites, Chestnut Ridge people, Free Black people, Lumbee, Pee Dee Lumbee, Melungeons, Redbones

The Dominickers were a small biracial ethnic group located within the Florida Panhandle, centered near the town of Ponce de Leon in Holmes County, Florida. Members of the group descended from a single interracial marriage during the Antebellum period, and were of generationally mixed African American and European American ancestry. The group became well known locally, to the extent that Dominicker and Dominickers became regional terms for people of mixed race. During the 20th century, academics classified them among 200 presumed "racial isolates" along groups such as the Redbones and Melungeons.

== Etymology ==
The term "Dominickers" first originated as a pejorative. According to local accounts, the name derives from a divorce case in which a local man described his estranged wife as "black and white, like an old Dominicker chicken." Over time, both "Dominicker" and "Dominickers" evolved into generalized racial terms within the region in reference to all people of mixed African and European ancestry.

The Redbones of Southwest Louisiana, who the Dominickers were mapped as residing nearby to, were sometimes called Dominics.

== History ==
The Dominickers were mixed-race descendants of the widow of a pre-Civil War plantation owner and one of her Black slaves, named Thomas. (Note: Thomas was also the name of the plantation owner. Thomas the slave was named after him, in accordance with a common practice wherein a slave took the name of their master.) She married him during the first years of the Civil War, and they later had five children together. Said children married both Black and white spouses, and their descendants rose in number over time. They populated the backwoods and swamps, typically in poverty, having large families and small farms. They became populous enough to establish their own identity by the 1920s.

The first known mention in print of the Dominickers was in a 1939 American Guide series on Florida. Author Cathy Salustri states the descriptions of Dominickers in the guide may be insensitive to some readers, noting it described them as "treacherous" and "vindictive". Researcher Calvin L. Beale noted sixty existed in 1950 Holmes County, who were only marked as white on the census. Similarly, there was no category for a mixed-race person recognized by the Florida Department of Health and Rehabilitative Services, thus social workers had to designate Dominicker children as either Black or white. (Note: Interracial marriage was illegal in Florida at the time.) They chose based on the race of their mother, and the racial makeup of the neighborhood of their parents.

Dominickers and other nearby population isolates, 1950.

Dominickers were not accepted as social equals by the white community, but they kept themselves apart from the main Black community as well. They formed a small middle layer of Holmes County society separate from both whites and Black people.

Before integration, their children were required to attend a one-room, twenty student segregated school (as required by Florida's Jim Crow laws). They were not provided with busing, and thus had to walk several miles to school. A Dominicker graveyard adjoined the school. Academic Ralph D. Howell suggested they looked Spanish or Cuban, noting some claimed Spanish origin, but stated some appeared to be Black. This variation of appearance was noted to be possible even within one family.

After desegregation, locals had varied opinions on if most Dominickers had assimilated into the main populations. Dental researcher Hamilton B.G. Robinson states the Dominickers, Redbones, and Brass Ankles should be of interest to researchers of human genetics, similarly to the Brandywine people. (Note: The Brandywine possess high phenotypic frequencies of Dentinogenesis imperfecta and Tyrosinase positive albinism, which Robinson attributes to the founder effect.)

== See also ==
- African-American family structure
- African Americans in Florida
- Ascribed status
- Ashworth family
- Alabama Cajans
- Black Dutch (genealogy)
- Brandywine people
- Brass Ankles
- Carmelites
- Chavis family
- Chestnut Ridge people
- Delaware Moors
- Endogamy
- Free Black
- Gibson family (Virginia)
- History of slavery in Florida
- Local history
- Louisiana Redbones
- Lumbee
- Melungeons
- Microhistory
- One-place study
- People's history
- Powhatan Renape Nation
- Ramapough Mountain People
