= Accokeek Creek Site =

- U.S. National Register of Historic Places
- U.S. National Historic Landmark
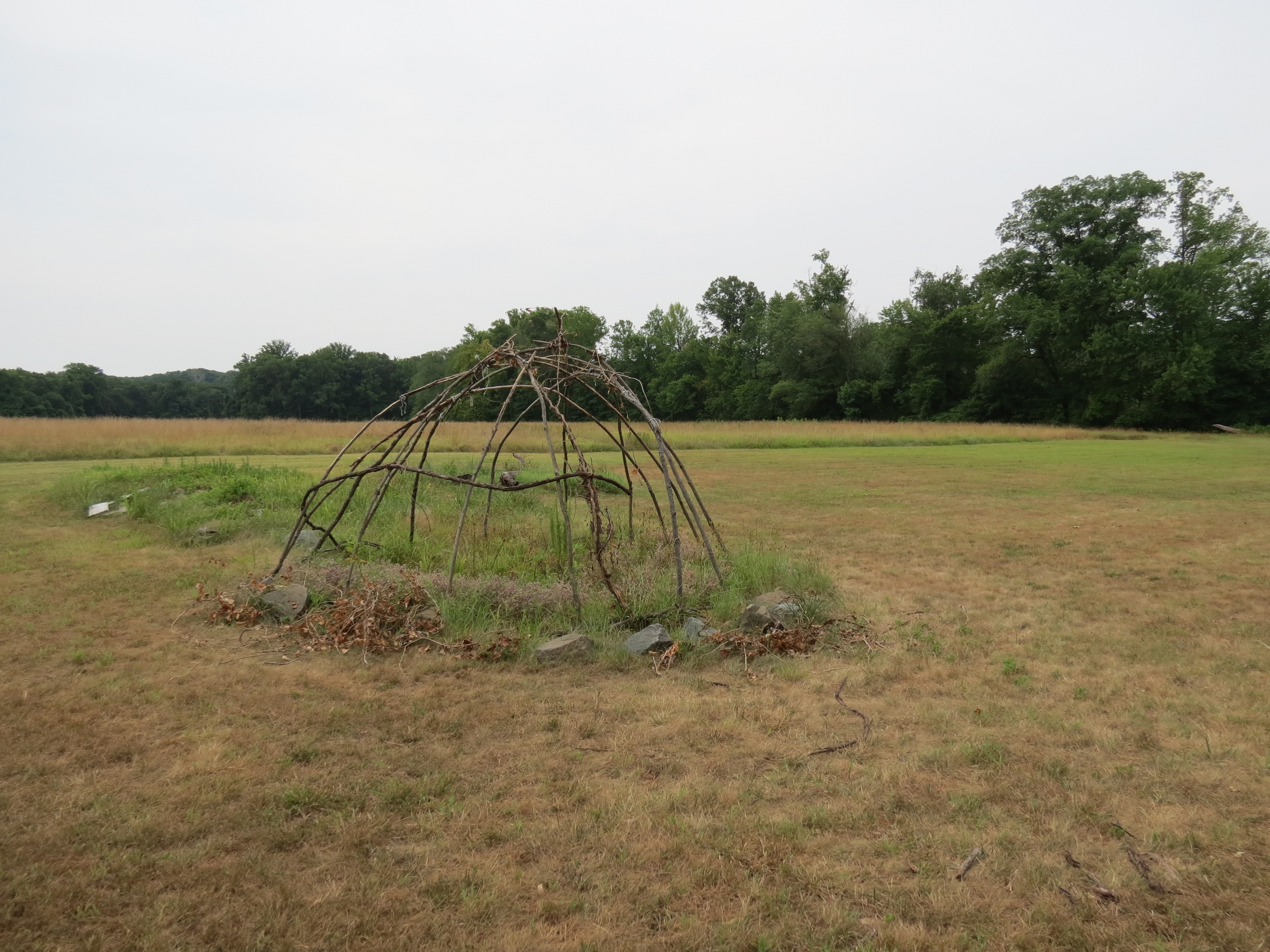

- Location within Maryland Location within the United States
- Nearest city: Accokeek, Maryland
- Coordinates: 38°41′45.7″N 77°03′06.6″W
- NRHP reference No.: 66000909

Significant dates
- Added to NRHP: October 15, 1966
- Designated NHL: July 19, 1964

Accokeek Creek Site, also known as Moyaone, is an archaeological site in Prince George's County, Maryland, located along the Potomac River across from Mount Vernon in today's Piscataway Park, which was inhabited intermittently since 2000 BC. Accokeek Creek Site was declared a National Historic Landmark in 1964.

== Description ==
The National Park Service describes the site as "remarkable for its variety and concentration of human occupation sites. Accokeek included a palisaded village that was occupied from ca. A.D. 1300 to ca. 1630. The site has been used by archeologists to define a culture-history sequence in prehistoric archaeology for the Mid-Atlantic region." The site dates from the Late Archaic Period, ca. 3,000 BC, to the historic period. During the Middle Woodland Period, ca. AD 800, small horticultural villages were established.

The village called Moyaone appeared during the late-16th and early-17th centuries. Moyaone, also named the Accokeek Creek site, is the sister site of Potomac Creek, 44ST2 and it is thought that they were settled around the same time. This village had many palisade lines and faced the Potomac. The formations of this site and Potomac Creek are similar in that the outermost system of the village is the only one to include an interior ditch or borrow pits. There are no bastions found at the Moyaone village. Its maximum population has been estimated to be between 300 and 320, while its size having been 6,100 m^{2}. Archaeology has indicated numerous building periods which leads to believing these people had a long occupation at the site. Four ossuaries were found near the village and hold the remains of over 1,000 people. The village was abandoned before Contact (clarification needed). At the north end of the area near the Piscataway Creek there was a rectangular fort that was occupied by the Susquehannocks in 1674-75.

== Ceramics ==
Moyaone ceramics are a Late Woodland ware and date from ca. 1300 to 1650 AD. They are found throughout the Western Shore Coastal Plain of Maryland. The ceramics are characterized by fine grained sand and mica temper, soft texture, compact paste, and smoothed interior and exterior surfaces. The paste is made of a fine-grained clay and has a texture that is soft, smooth, and compact. The temper is made from a fine-grained sand that has mica in it, which gives off a slight glitter appearance.

There are three defined types named Moyaone Plain, Moyaone Cord-Impressed, and Moyaone Incised. Moyaone Plain is undecorated. The Cord-Impressed is a simple ceramic and decoration is limited to the rim and lip. Decorations include stamped, rolled onto the vessel, or a cord that is horizontal, vertical, or diagonal to the rim. The Incised decoration is limited to the lip, rim, and upper body area. The decoration used on this type of ceramic consists of incised lines that are made with a sharp tool or a wide, dull tool.

== Significance ==
The site was excavated by Alice L.L. Ferguson in the 1930s and 40s, with the obtained material subsequently analyzed by Robert L. Stephenson in the 1950s. The site served as a basis for understanding the ceramic chronology that appears in the Middle Atlantic region. The chronology that was made was the Early Woodland Marcey Creek/Accokeek/Popes Creek, Middle Woodland Mockley, Late Woodland Potomac Creek continuum. The Moyaone village represents the largest and last-occupied Piscataway village before the arrival of Europeans.

Piscataway leader Turkey Tayac "supported the creation of Piscataway Park [at the site], on one condition: that he could be buried there, and that his people could always visit freely, for cultural and spiritual purposes." Because there was no record of this verbal agreement and handshake, he was not buried at Moyaone until 1979, a year after his death, when Congress passed legislation permitting his burial in a national park area.

== See also ==
- Piscataway Park
- Potomac Creek, 44ST2
- Henry G. Ferguson
- Moyaone Reserve
- List of National Historic Landmarks in Maryland
- National Register of Historic Places listings in Prince George's County, Maryland
- Piscataway people

== Selected publications ==
- The Accokeek Creek Site, A Middle Atlantic Seaboard Culture Sequence. Robert L. Stephenson and Alice L. L. Ferguson, with sections by Henry G. Ferguson. (Anthropological Papers No. 20, Museum of Anthropology, University of Michigan) Ann Arbor, Michigan, 1963.
- Barse, William P. A Trail Formulation of Vessel Assemblages in Selected Accokeek, Popes Creek, and Mockley Ware Collections. 1990.
- Stephenson, Robert L. Prehistoric People of Accokeek Creek. 1959.
