= Accokeek, Maryland =

- Census-designated place
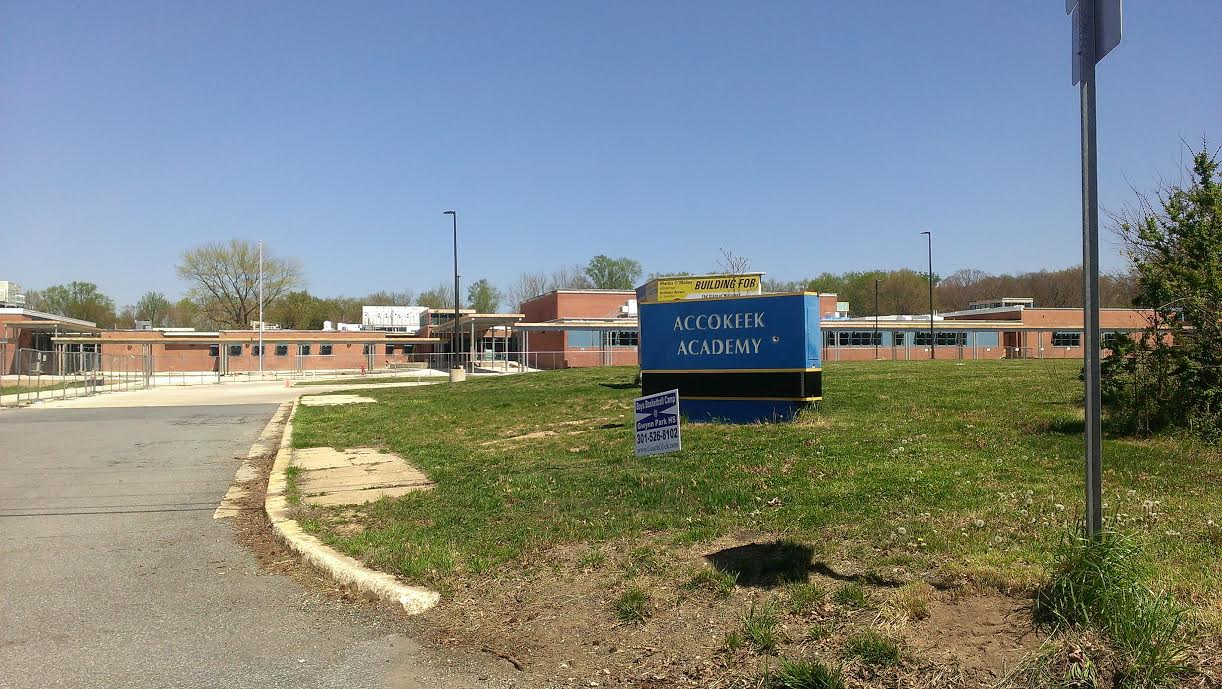
- Accokeek Academy school at 14400 Berry Road in Accokeek, MD

- Location in Prince George's County

- Location in the United States
- Coordinates: 38°40′35″N 77°00′01″W
- Country: United States
- State: Maryland
- County: Prince George's
- First settled: c. 1200
- Founded: 1608
- Designated CDP: 1990

Government
  - Type: Unincorporated, county administrated

Area
  - Total: 28.79 sq mi (74.57 km^{2})
  - Land: 27.42 sq mi (71.03 km^{2})
  - Water: 1.37 sq mi (3.54 km^{2})
- Elevation: 194 ft (59 m)

Population (2020)
  - Total: 13,927
  - Rank: 118th
  - Density: 507.8/sq mi (196.06/km^{2})
- Time zone: UTC-5 (Eastern (EST))
  - Summer (DST): UTC-4 (EDT)
- ZIP code: 20607
- Area code: 301, 240
- FIPS code: 24-00250
- GNIS feature ID: 596993

Accokeek (/ˈækəkiːk/), "at the edge of the hill" in Algonquin, is a census-designated place (CDP) located in Prince George's County, Maryland, United States. The CDP is located on the Potomac River, borders Charles County and is approximately 17 miles from Washington. It is a part of the Washington metropolitan area. The population of the CDP, as of the 2020 United States census was 13,927.

While the area around Accokeek was inhabited by Native Americans since approximately 2,000 BCE, John Smith was the first European to visit the area in 1608. In 1990, the United States Census Bureau officially made Accokeek a CDP.

== History ==
The area around Accokeek had been occupied since around 2000 BC; however, the first permanent village was established in c. 1200 AD by the Piscataway tribe. Captain John Smith was the first European to see the Accokeek area. In 1608, he sailed the Potomac River and found the Moyaone village. At the time of the discovery, Moyaone was the seat of government for the Piscataway Tribe. The village of Moyaone disbanded and the population migrated to other tribes before other Europeans settled the area.

In the mid-17th century, settlers were purchasing large plots of land for farming. The Native Americans were upset that the settlers were wearing-out the land due to farming various crops, which led to multiple battles between the two. Between 1675 and 1682, the Native Americans were forced from the area as a result of losing.

In 1861, Accokeek was still rural, and agriculture was the main economic factor for the place. Tobacco was the main crop planted. During the American Civil War (1861–1865), Accokeek sympathized with the Confederacy. According to the 1860 Census, the area around Accokeek had a slave population of 1,600 (52.6%). There were multiple Confederate spies in the area, including Thomas Harbin who opened a hotel in the area and had plans to kidnap then-President Abraham Lincoln.

Henry and Alice Ferguson settled in Accokeek when they purchased Hard Bargain Farm overlooking the Potomac River in 1922 as a vacation retreat. Between 1935 and 1939 Alice Ferguson initiated archaeological excavations. A fort from the Susquehannock people, which was demolished in 1675, was found. In 1957, US Senator Frances P. Bolton founded the Accokeek Foundation. The Foundation was used to purchase 200 acres (81 ha) of land in Piscataway Park to help preserve the area. Much of the community west of Route 210 is designated the Moyaone Reserve and contains mid-century, individually-designed homes on minimum 5-acre wooded lots. Community educational attractions include Hard Bargain Farm (Ferguson Foundation) and the National Colonial Farm (National Park Service), which are listed below under "Parks and Recreation." Both these sites have numerous special events, including an annual Oktoberfest, and a "theater in the woods". In 1960, the Washington Suburban Sanitary Commission (WSSC) wanted to build a water treatment plant in Mockley Point, which was Accokeek shoreline. Since it would disrupt the view of Mount Vernon and Fort Washington Park, various people and organizations protested against it. In 1961, a law was signed by President John F. Kennedy in order to designate 133 acres (54 ha) around Mockley Point as a national landmark. Both the Accokeek Foundation and the Alice Ferguson Foundation donated another 505 acres (204 ha) to the landmark. As a result, WSSC was not allowed to build the plant there; however, a plant was built in the 1960s in the surrounding area.

In 1990, Accokeek officially became a CDP when the US Census Bureau defined the place's boundaries. In 2008, eight people were killed and 9 more were injured in Accokeek on Indian Head Highway in an illegal street race.

== Geography ==
Accokeek is located in the Southern United States, in Southern Maryland, and approximately 17 miles (27 km) from Washington, D.C. To the north, Accokeek borders the CDPs of Fort Washington and Clinton; to the east, it borders the CDP of Brandywine; to the south, it borders the CDPs of Bryans Road, Bensville, and Waldorf, all of which are located in Charles County; and to the west, it borders the Potomac River, which flows into the Chesapeake Bay.

According to the United States Census Bureau, the place has a total area of 28.803 square miles (74.60 km^{2}), of which 27.436 square miles (71.06 km^{2}) is land and 1.367 square miles (3.54 km^{2}) is water. Accokeek has an average elevation of 194 feet (59 m).

=== Climate ===
According to the Köppen climate classification system, Accokeek is considered to have a humid subtropical climate (Cfa). This means Accokeek's average temperature of the warmest month is above 72 °F (22 °C), the average temperature of the coldest month is below between 27 and 64 °F (−3 and 18 °C), and rain is equally spread out through the year.

There is more precipitation in the area during the months of May and July (4.1 inch; 104 mm) than in any other month; Accokeek currently has an annual precipitation of 39 inches (1,009 mm) each year. July is the hottest month, on average; the hottest recorded temperature occurred in July 1954 and September 1983. January is the coldest month, and the lowest recorded temperature was recorded in January 1950.

Climate data for Accokeek, MD
Month	Jan	Feb	Mar	Apr	May	Jun	Jul	Aug	Sep	Oct	Nov	Dec	Year
Record high °F (°C)	79 (26)	81 (27)	91 (33)	95 (35)	96 (36)	100 (38)	103 (39)	102 (39)	103 (39)	96 (36)	86 (30)	77 (25)	103 (39)
Mean daily maximum °F (°C)	44 (7)	49 (9)	58 (14)	68 (20)	75 (24)	81 (27)	85 (29)	83 (28)	78 (26)	68 (20)	59 (15)	48 (9)	66 (19)
Mean daily minimum °F (°C)	26 (−3)	28 (−2)	35 (2)	43 (6)	53 (12)	62 (17)	67 (19)	65 (18)	59 (15)	47 (8)	38 (3)	30 (−1)	46 (8)
Record low °F (°C)	−8 (−22)	−2 (−19)	1 (−17)	20 (−7)	29 (−2)	39 (4)	46 (8)	45 (7)	31 (−1)	19 (−7)	9 (−13)	1 (−17)	−8 (−22)
Average precipitation inches (mm)	3.4 (86)	3.0 (76)	4.0 (100)	3.1 (79)	4.1 (100)	3.8 (97)	4.1 (100)	4.6 (120)	4.3 (110)	3.4 (86)	3.2 (81)	3.2 (81)	44.2 (1,116)
Source: The Weather Channel

== Demographics ==
Historical population
Census	Pop.	Note	%±
1980	3,894		—
1990	4,477		15.0%
2000	7,349		64.2%
2010	10,573		43.9%
2020	13,927		31.7%
U.S. Decennial Census; 2010 2020

=== Racial and ethnic composition ===
Accokeek CDP, Maryland – Racial and ethnic composition Note: the US Census treats Hispanic/Latino as an ethnic category. This table excludes Latinos from the racial categories and assigns them to a separate category. Hispanics/Latinos may be of any race.
Race / Ethnicity (NH = Non-Hispanic)	Pop 2000	Pop 2010	Pop 2020	% 2000	% 2010	% 2020
White alone (NH)	3,112	2,488	1,996	42.35%	23.53%	14.33%
Black or African American alone (NH)	3,467	6,706	9,345	47.18%	63.43%	67.10%
Native American or Alaska Native alone (NH)	33	44	51	0.45%	0.42%	0.37%
Asian alone (NH)	381	579	652	5.18%	5.48%	4.68%
Native Hawaiian or Pacific Islander alone (NH)	2	3	9	0.03%	0.03%	0.06%
Other race alone (NH)	10	6	95	0.14%	0.06%	0.68%
Mixed race or Multiracial (NH)	172	250	664	2.34%	2.36%	4.77%
Hispanic or Latino (any race)	172	497	1,115	2.34%	4.70%	8.01%
Total	7,349	10,573	13,927	100.00%	100.00%	100.00%

=== 2020 census ===
As of the 2020 census, Accokeek had a population of 13,927. The median age was 42.5 years. 21.4% of residents were under the age of 18 and 14.2% of residents were 65 years of age or older. For every 100 females there were 92.6 males, and for every 100 females age 18 and over there were 90.2 males age 18 and over.

83.6% of residents lived in urban areas, while 16.4% lived in rural areas.

There were 4,662 households in Accokeek, of which 34.7% had children under the age of 18 living in them. Of all households, 58.3% were married-couple households, 14.0% were households with a male householder and no spouse or partner present, and 23.1% were households with a female householder and no spouse or partner present. About 17.7% of all households were made up of individuals and 5.8% had someone living alone who was 65 years of age or older.

There were 4,813 housing units, of which 3.1% were vacant. The homeowner vacancy rate was 1.1% and the rental vacancy rate was 5.8%.

=== 2010 census ===
As of the 2010 census, there were 10,573 people, 3,601 households, and 2,835 families residing in the city. The population density was 385.5 inhabitants per square mile. There were 3,816 housing units at an average density of 139.1 per square mile. Accokeek is a part of the Washington Metropolitan Area, in which Accokeek contains approximately 0.19% of the MSA's population.

There were 3,601 households, of which 34.4% had children under the age of 18 living with them, 62.8% were married couples living together, 11.4% had a female householder with no husband present, 4.5% had a male householder with no wife present, and 21.3% were non-families. 16.8% of all households were made up of individuals, and 19.9% had someone living alone who was 65 years of age or older. The average household size was 2.94, and the average family size was 3.29.

The median age of the city was 41.2 years. 24.3% of residents were under the age of 18; 7.6% were between the age of 18 and 24; 25.5% were from 25 to 44; 33.5% were from 45 to 64; and 9.2% were 65 years of age or older. The gender makeup of the city was 49.2% males and 50.8% female. The racial makeup of the city was 64.4% African American, 24.9% White, 0.02% Native American, 5.5% Asian, 1.9% other races, and 2.8% from two or more races. Hispanic or Latino of any race were 4.7% of the population. As of 2013, 92.8% (9,690) of Accokeek residents spoke English at home as a primary language, while 3.2% (335) spoke Spanish and 2.4% (253) spoke Tagalog. In total, 7.1% (750) of Accokeek's population age five and older spoke another language other than English.

== Economy ==
According to the 2014 American Community Survey 5-Year Estimates, Accokeek has a median household income of $126,000, which is 2.35-times the United States' average of 53,482 and 1.69-times the State of Maryland's average of $74,149. The top industry is public administration (26.9%), followed by professional, scientific, and management, and administrative and waste management services (20.2%). Agriculture, forestry, fishing and hunting, and mining (0.2%) is the smallest industry. The unemployment rate of Accokeek was estimated to be 6.7%.

Italian arms company Beretta opened a factory in Accokeek in 1978. It won a federal contract to produce M9 pistols for the military in 1985. As of 2007, the company employed approximately 220 people, making it the largest employer in Accokeek. In 2013, as a response to Maryland's Firearm Safety Act, Beretta closed the factory and moved operations to Gallatin, Tennessee, in 2016.

== Parks and recreation ==
The following sites located at Accokeek are included on the National Register of Historic Places:

	Name on the Register	Image	Date listed	Location	Description
1	Accokeek Creek Site	Accokeek Creek Site	October 15, 1966 (#66000909)	3400 Bryan Point Rd, Accokeek, MD 20607; 38°41′46″N 77°03′07″W	Site of a palisaded village that was occupied from ca. A.D. 1300 to ca. 1630.
2	Bellevue	Bellevue	August 21, 1986 (#86001738)	200 Manning Rd E 38°39′42″N 77°00′11″W	Greek Revival style home constructed about 1840.
3	Hard Bargain Farm	Hard Bargain Farm	October 8, 2014 (#14000839)	2001 Bryan Point Road; 38°41′21″N 77°02′41″W	Former country estate and working farm of Alice and Henry Ferguson
4	Moyaone Reserve	Moyaone Reserve	October 7, 2020 (#100005659)	Roughly bounded by Bryan Point Rd., Piscataway Park, Overlook Dr./Old Landing Rd., and Farmington Rd. West; 38°41′27″N 77°01′25″W	Community with a history of conservation and modernist architecture.
5	Piscataway Park	Piscataway Park	October 15, 1966 (#66000144)	East of Potomac River, south of Piscataway Creek, in Prince George's and Charles Counties; 38°40′43″N 77°05′34″W	Location of Marshall Hall and the National Colonial Farm.

== Government ==
Prince George's County Police Department District 5 Station in Clinton CDP and District 7 Station in Fort Washington CDP serve the community.

The U.S. Postal Service operates the Accokeek Post Office.

== Education ==
According to the US Census' American Community Survey, 2.59% of the population from 25 to 64 years has less than a high school diploma, 26.17% have a high school diploma, 30.32% have some college of associate degree, and 40.90% have a bachelor's degree or higher.

=== Primary and secondary schools ===
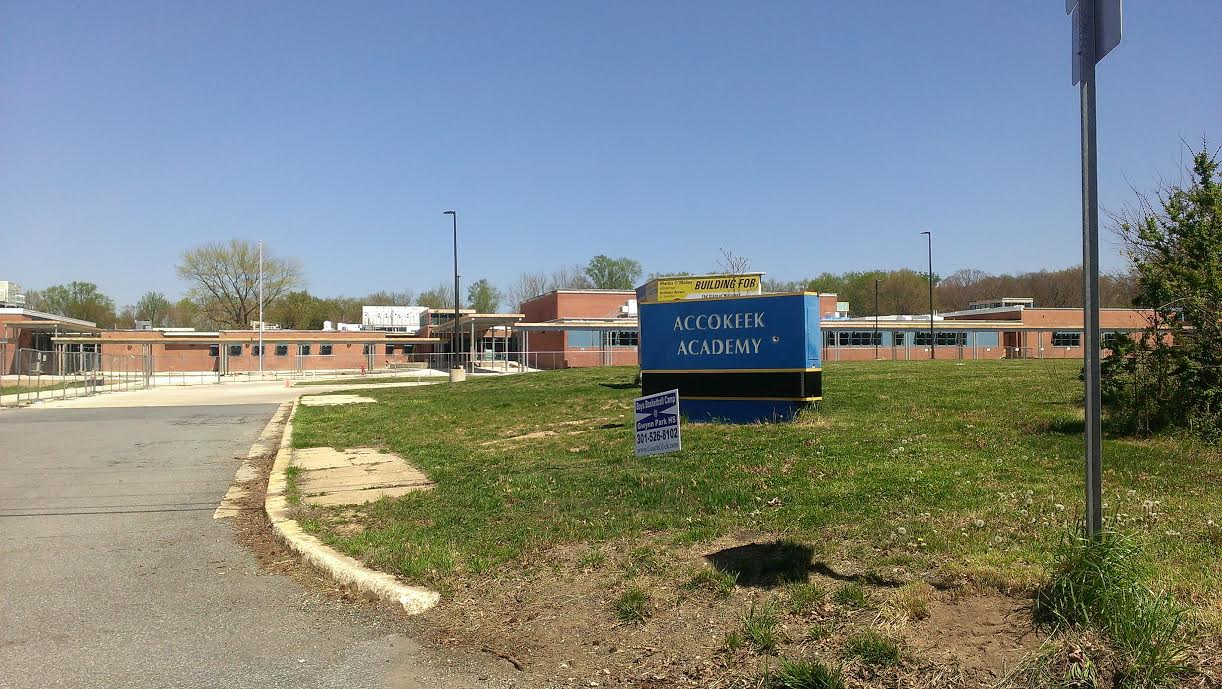
Accokeek Academy

Accokeek is under the Prince George's County Public Schools district.

It has one public school, Accokeek Academy, which serves all of the CDP for elementary and middle school. It was formed in 2009 by the merger of Henry G. Ferguson Elementary School, built in 1963, and Eugene Burroughs Middle School, built in 1966. The newly merged school retained separate elementary and middle school campuses. In 2010 the school had a total of 1,178 students, with 553 at the elementary campus and 625 at the middle school campus. In 2011 the elementary school population had increased to 570. In a period after 2011 the fifth grade was moved to the middle school complex for two reasons: The first was so Burroughs middle school could have a higher occupancy rate, giving it eligibility for renovation funds from the State of Maryland. The second was to alleviate overcrowding in the original elementary building, which had a capacity of about 410 students; the middle school building had a capacity of 805 students.

Even though initially some parents advocated for having a single combined PK-8 building, the district instead chose to rebuild the elementary building; a study from 2008 had described the elementary building as having one of the poorest states of repair in the PGCPS system. The school planned to construct a more than 3,000-square-foot (280 m^{2}), two-story facility. After the scheduled completion of the new elementary building in August 2013, the district planned to temporarily house the middle school students there while the middle school building is renovated, and in 2014 put the students in their respective permanent buildings. In addition PGCPS planned to establish a walkway between the two buildings. The State of Maryland was to spend over $7 million while PGCPS was to spend fewer than $19 million, so the total cost was over $26 million.

All of the CDP is zoned to Gwynn Park High School, located in Brandywine CDP. There is also a private school, Accokeek College Preparatory School, the secondary school campus of The Beddow Schools.

From 1950 to 1964, during the era of legally-required racial segregation of schools, black students from Accokeek attended Fairmont Heights High School, then near Fairmount Heights.

=== Public libraries ===
Prince George's County Memorial Library System operates the Accokeek Library Branch.

== Transportation ==
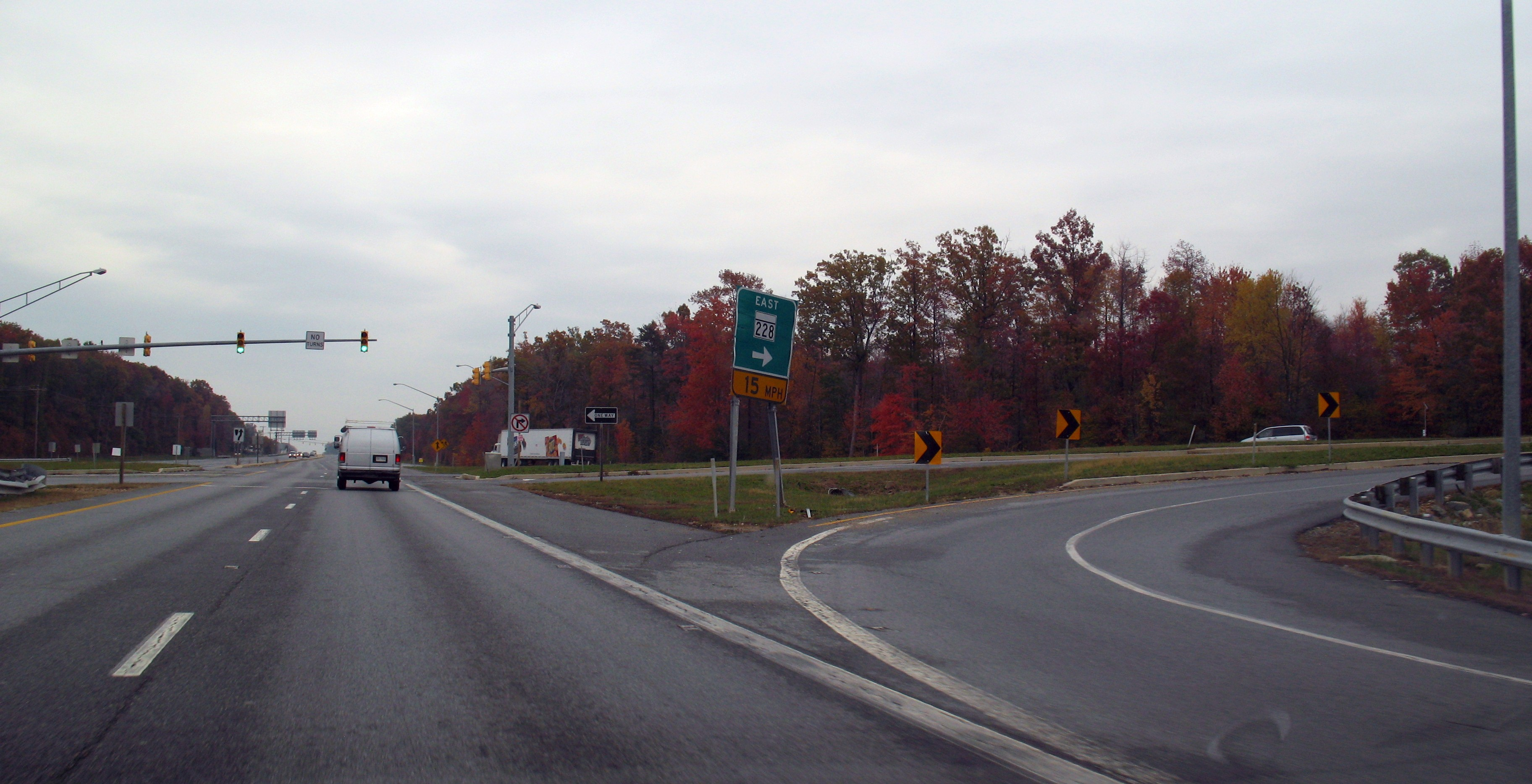
A picture from a vehicle located on MD 210, with an exit to MD 228 located on the right

The State of Maryland's MTA Maryland operates two express commuter buses, routes 640 and 650, which operate from Waldorf or La Plata, stopping in Accokeek en route to Washington, D.C. There are currently no Interstate Highways in Accokeek; however there are four state highways:

- MD 210, Indian Head Highway
- MD 228, Berry Road
- MD 229, Bensville Road
- MD 373, Accokeek Road

== Notable people ==
- Jarrett Hurd, boxer, former WBA, IBF & IBO light middleweight world champion.
- Link Wray, American rock and roll guitarist, songwriter, and vocalist
- Henry G. Ferguson, USGS geologist who worked in the Great Basin
- Kimberly Klacik, Republican Congressional nominee, non-profit founder, and politician
- Tré Seals, type designer and typographer
- Joe Hickerson, folk singer and folk music academic (worked at the Library of Congress)
