= Powhatan Renape Nation =

State-recognized tribe in New Jersey

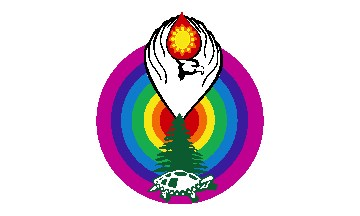
- Powhatan Renape Nation flag
- Nickname: Rankokus Indian Reservation
- Named after: Powhatan people, Renape people, Rancocas, New Jersey
- Formation: 1974
- Founder: Roy Johnson
- Founded at: Rancocas, New Jersey
- Headquarters: Westampton, New Jersey, United States
- Official language: English

The Powhatan Renape Nation is a state-recognized tribe in New Jersey. It is not federally recognized as a Native American tribe. Members are concentrated in South Jersey and the Philadelphia metropolitan area.

The organization's founder and chief was Roy Crazy Horse, also known as Nemattanew or Roy Johnson. He obtained the land for the Rankokus Indian Reservation in 1974, which later became part of the Rancocas State Park.

== State-recognition ==
The Powhatan Renape Nation was granted state recognition in New Jersey in 1980. On March 18, 2019, the state recognized was reaffirmed.

The Powhatan Renape Nation has a "State Indian reservation" in Rancocas, New Jersey. Established in 1982, the State of New Jersey negotiated an agreement with the Powhatan Renape Nation to take over 350 acres of state land, which the state now recognizes as the Rankokus Indian Reservation.

The federally recognized Delaware Nation regards the Powhatan Renape Nation as a fraudulent organization, as they have stated that they "do not acknowledge or work with any non-federally recognized groups that claim Lenape identity or nationhood, which includes “state recognized” groups as we do not agree with state recognition."

The federally recognized Delaware Tribe of Indians has issued a resolution which "denounces fabricated Delaware groups and commits to exposing and assisting state and federal authorities in eradicating any group which attempts or claims to operate as a government of the Delaware people". The resolution refers to Lenape heritage groups and state-recognized tribes in Delaware, New Jersey, New York and Pennsylvania as CPAINs.

== Petition for federal recognition ==
On April 12, 1996, the Powhatan Renape Nation, then based in Rancocas, New Jersey, filed a petition for federal acknowledgment of existence of an Indian tribe with the U.S. Bureau of Indian Affairs. However, they did not complete their petition or gain federal recognition.

== Membership ==
In 1983, the Powhatan Renape Nation had between 400 and 500 members.

== See also ==
- Brandywine people
  - Piscataway Indian Nation and Tayac Territory
  - Piscataway-Conoy Tribe of Maryland
- Delaware Moors
  - Lenape Indian Tribe of Delaware
  - Nanticoke Indian Association
  - Nanticoke Lenni-Lenape Tribal Nation
- Lenape Nation of Pennsylvania
- Lumbee
  - Lumbee Tribe of North Carolina
- Ramapough Mountain Indians
- State-recognized tribes in the United States
