= Piscataway Park =

Park in Maryland

- IUCN category V (protected landscape/seascape)
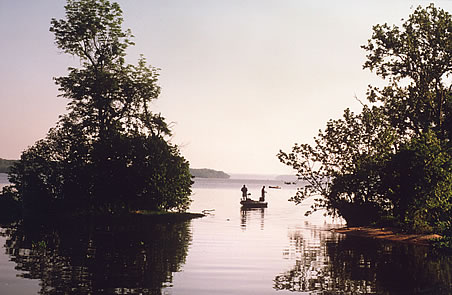
- View of the Potomac River at Piscataway Park

- Location within Maryland Location within the United States
- Location: Prince George's County, Maryland, USA
- Nearest city: Accokeek, MD
- Coordinates: 38°40′43″N 77°05′34″W
- Established: October 4, 1961
- Visitors: 275,070 (in 2025)
- Governing body: National Park Service
- Website: Piscataway Park
- Piscataway Park
- U.S. National Register of Historic Places
- Nearest city: Accokeek, Maryland
- Area: 4,216.5 acres (1,706.4 ha)
- NRHP reference No.: 66000144
- Added to NRHP: October 15, 1966

Piscataway Park is a National Park Service–protected area located 20 miles (32 km) southwest of downtown Washington, D.C. in and around Accokeek, Maryland. It protects the National Colonial Farm, Marshall Hall, and the Accokeek Creek Site. The park is located across the Potomac River from George Washington's Mount Vernon estate.

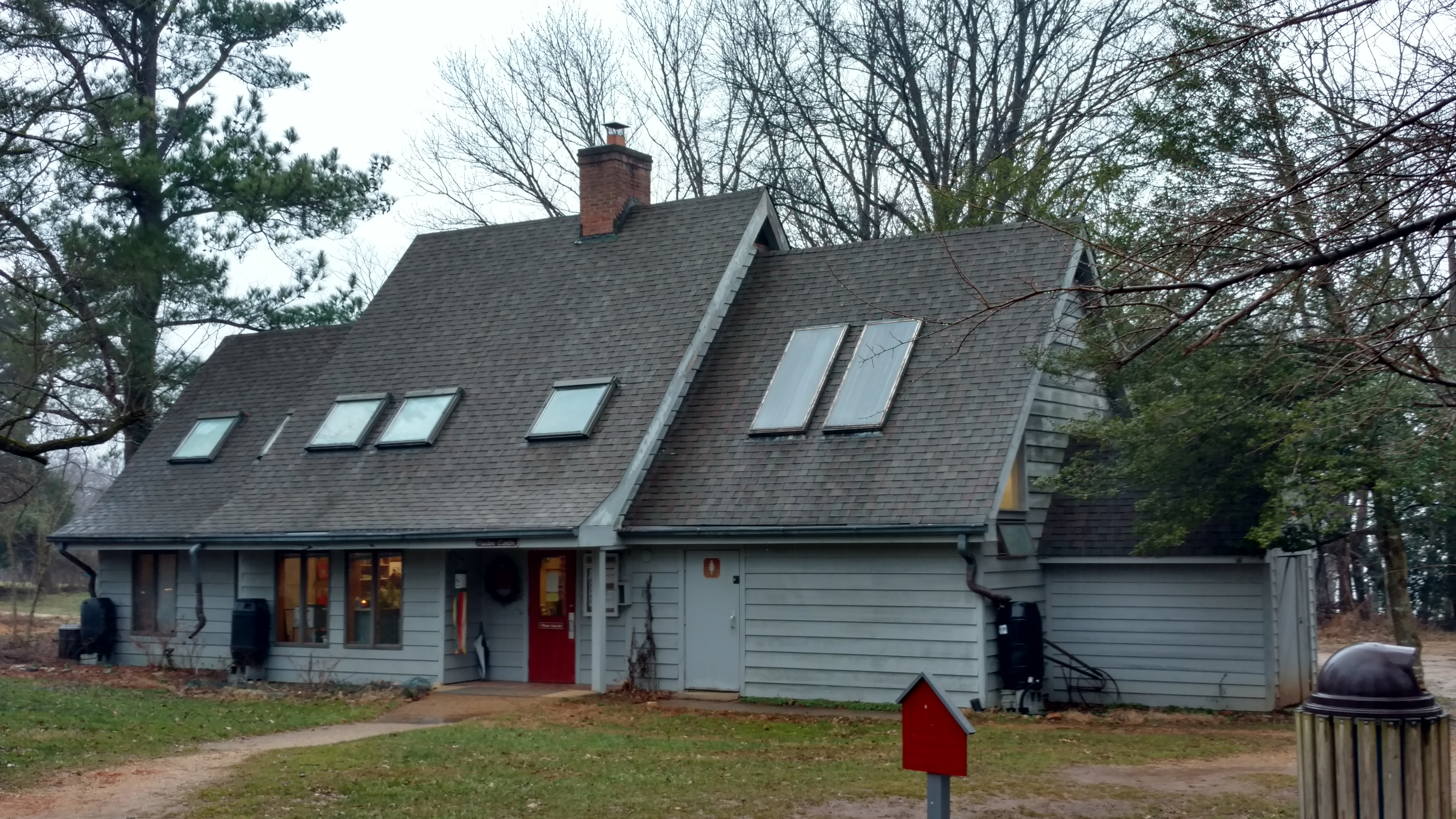
Piscataway Park/National Colonial Farm Visitor Center

Piscataway Park is named after Piscataway Creek, itself named for a Native American tribe. The park is home to bald eagles, beavers, osprey, and other wildlife and encompasses areas of wetland, meadow and woodland. It is administered jointly by the Accokeek Foundation, which has a cooperative agreement with the National Park Service to steward about 200 acres of the park, and the National Park Service and is managed by National Capital Parks-East.

== History ==
Henry and Alice Ferguson bought more than 100 acres (0.40 km^{2}) of land in the area in 1928. It includes the area of Moyaone, a Native American Piscataway village. The Fergusons bought more property and encouraged friends to settle nearby, where they could protect the environment. After Alice's death in 1951, Ferguson created the Alice Ferguson Foundation, which administered the land. The foundation made arrangements to donate property to the National Park Service for parkland, a transaction completed in the 1960s. This both protected the environment, as well as the historic viewshed as seen from the Mount Vernon mansion, keeping the parkland as it was in George Washington's day, and preventing modern development along the shore of the river.

== Historic shad hatchery ==
In 1898, the federal government established a shad hatchery at Bryan Point, two miles south of Washington, D.C. in modern-day Piscataway Park. In 1918, the Evening Star reported that the hatchery released 78,000,000 shad eggs into the river during the 1917 fiscal year. The goal of the hatchery was to preserve the shad populations because shad fishing was an important part of the region's economy.

== Marshall Hall amusement park ==
Piscataway Park includes the Marshall Hall amusement park, which was closed in 1980 due to financial issues. The outlawing of slot machine gambling and racism may have played a role in the demise of the park. While the park was segregated in the early part of its existence, this changed after the Civil Rights Movement in the 1960s. Additionally, its last jousting tournament was held in 1964.

== Plants and wildlife ==
The park, because it encompasses woodlands, wetlands, meadows, and cultivated spaces, is home to a wide variety of plant and animal life. Many of these plants and animals have significant historic and cultural importance to the Piscataway people. On the portion of the park stewarded by the Accokeek Foundation, numerous trails offer access to these native plants and the animals that rely on them.

== Hiking trails ==
Piscataway Park has several hiking trails open to the public. Its Pumpkin Ash trail is one such trail. The trail traverses forest, scrub-shrub wetland, and takes visitors to shoreline on the Potomac River. The forest ecosystem on the trail includes pawpaw trees, Tulip Poplar, and American Holly. The wetland, which is tidal, consists of dead Pumpkin Ash trees, Black Willow, Dogwoods, American Sycamore, and Spicebush.

Blackberry Trail is another hiking trail open to the public. Blackberry trail connects Pumpkin Ash trail to the Visitor Parking Lot on one side and the Accokeek Connector Trail on another. Like Pumpkin Ash trail, Blackberry has pawpaw, tulip poplar, and American Holly. It also boasts eastern red cedar, an evergreen conifer. The trail has spring ephemerals like mayapple.

Riverview Trail connects the Pumpkin Ash trail to Persimmon Trail on the other end of the park. It takes visitors along the Potomac, though most of the view is obscured by a riparian forest buffer. The trail includes species such as black walnut, pawpaw, hackberry, swamp white oak, and American Persimmon.

== Historic structures in the park ==
On the side of the park stewarded by the Accokeek Foundation, two historic structures are open to the public. One is Laurel Branch, originally constructed in Waldorf, Maryland. It was disassembled, moved to Piscataway Park, and reassembled for the purpose of creating an accurate replica of a colonial farm.

The other structure is a replica of a tobacco barn, also not original to the site. It was created from the remaining good wood from two decaying tobacco barns in Anne Arundel County.

== Liberty tree ==
In 2026, a "liberty tree" was planted in Piscataway Park. Liberty trees are trees which were alive at the time of the Revolutionary War. Maryland's liberty tree was a tulip poplar from St. John's College in Annapolis. Before it was destroyed by a hurricane in 1999, scions—direct descendants of the original liberty tree—were taken. One such scion was planted in Piscataway Park, preserving the direct DNA of the original liberty tree in Annapolis.
