= Ramapough Mountain Indians =

Indigenous tribe recognized by New Jersey

- Ramapough Lunaape Nation Inc.
- Named after: Ramapo Mountains, Lenape people
- Formation: 1980, incorporated
- Type: nonprofit, state-recognized tribe
- Tax ID no.: EIN 22-2226221
- Location: Mahwah, New Jersey, United States
- Members: 5,000 (1992)
- Official language: English
- Executive Director: Vince Morgan
- Key people: Vincent Mann
- Revenue: $217,243 (2024)
- Expenses: $203,864 (2024)
- Staff: 0
- Website: ramapomunsee.net

The Ramapough Mountain Indians (also spelled Ramapo), also known as the Ramapough Lenape Nation, Ramapough Lunaape Munsee Delaware Nation, or Ramapo Mountain people, are a New Jersey state-recognized tribe based in Mahwah. They have approximately 5,000 members living in and around the Ramapo Mountains of Bergen and Passaic counties in northern New Jersey and Rockland County in southern New York, about 25 miles (40 km) from New York City.

The Ramapough Lenape Indian Nation claims a line of descent from the Lenape, whose regional bands included the Hackensack, Tappan, Rumachenanck, Munsee, and Ramapo people. They have historically been alleged to have Tuscarora, African, Romani, Hessian, and Dutch ancestries. The Ramapough membership are working to learn the Munsee language.

They were recognized in 1980 by the state of New Jersey as the Ramapough Lenape Nation but are not recognized federally or by the state of New York. Their claim of descent is contested by the Bureau of Indian Affairs, who rejected their petition for federal recognition. It is also contested by some scholars, who write they instead descend from free Black landowners in New Netherland.

== Governance ==
The Ramapough Mountain Indians organized in 1978. That year, they filed a petition with the federal Bureau of Indian Affairs of intent to gain federal recognition as a tribe. They have a chief and council form of government.

=== Nonprofit organization ===
The Ramapough Mountain Indians, or the Ramapough Lunaape (Note: Scholar Renate Bartl writes there is no documented evidence for the spelling "Lunaape" for "Lenape", and suggests the tribe created the term.) Nation Inc., incorporated as a 501(c)(3) nonprofit organization in 1980.

=== Government ===
The Ramapough are organized into clans for self-government: the Wolf, the Turtle, and the Deer, related to their three main settlements of Mahwah and Ringwood, New Jersey, and Hillburn, New York.

As of 2023, their executive director is Vince Morgan. Vincent Mann is the current chief. He created the Three Sisters Farm, and has spoken at universities on the effects of toxic waste dumping, and advocated against dumping by Ford at the Ringwood site.

The tribe has required members to be descended directly from an identified Ramapough parent listed in tribal records. Applicants must provide certified birth certificates and documentation of at least three generations to a listed ancestor.

== Recognition status ==
=== Recognition in New Jersey ===
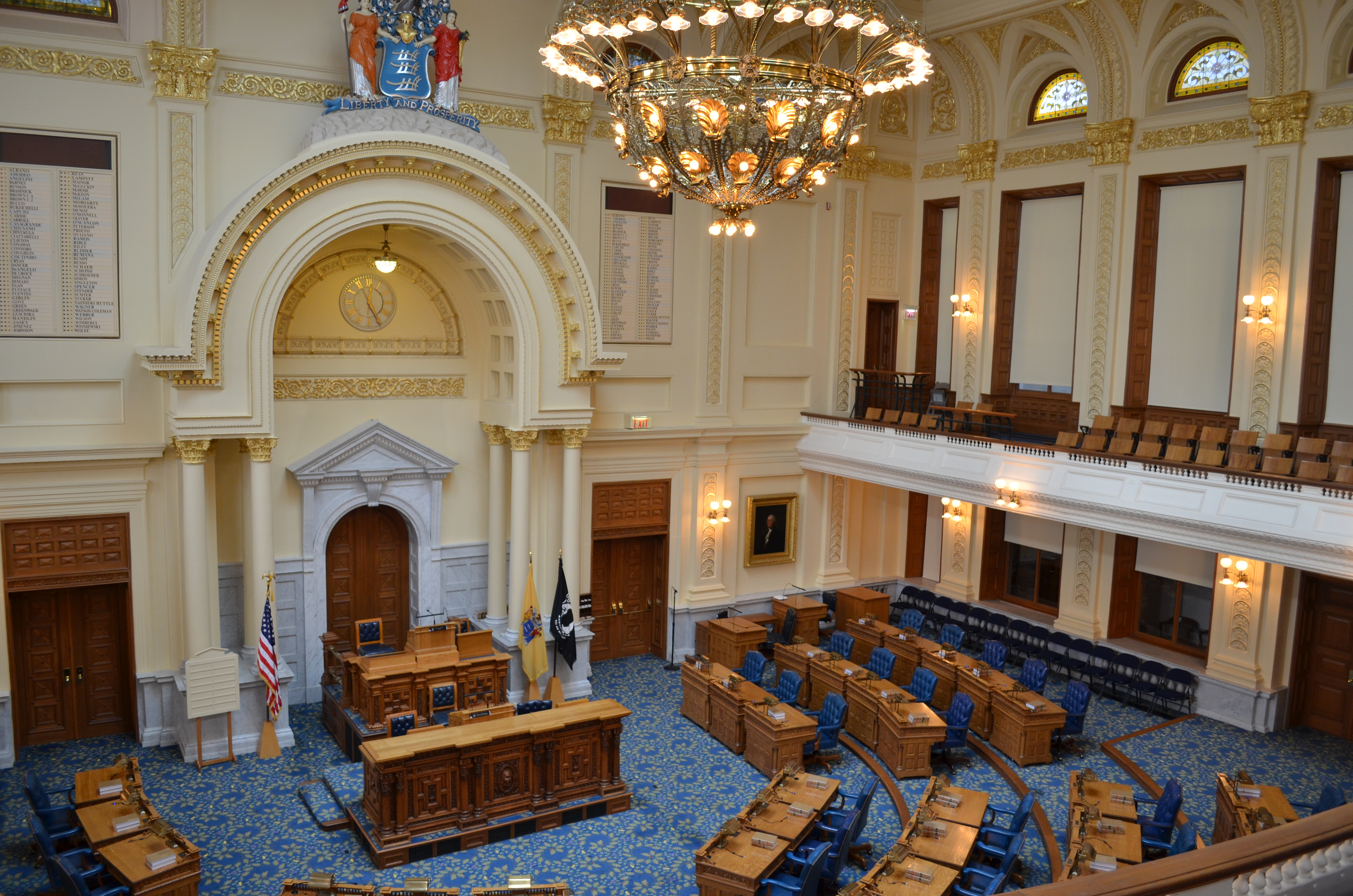
The New Jersey Assembly debated the historicity of the Ramapough.

The Ramapough and two other tribes were recognized as Indian tribes in 1980 by the state of New Jersey by Resolution 3031. The New Jersey citation stated:

Be it resolved by the General Assembly of the State of New Jersey (the Senate concurring): 1. That the Ramapough Mountain People of the Ramapough Mountains of Bergen and Passaic counties, descendants of the Iroquois and Algonquin nations, are hereby designated by the State of New Jersey as the Ramapough Indians.

The tribe asked its New Jersey Assembly member, W. Cary Edwards, to seek state recognition. After several months of research, Edwards and Assemblyman Kern introduced Assembly Concurrent Resolution No. 3031 (ACR3031) on May 21, 1979. It passed the Assembly and was passed by the Senate on January 7, 1980.

Edwards said later that debate in the assembly related to a book written by historian David Cohen; he noted that he and other endorsers of recognition had to demonstrate the historical basis of the Ramapough. At the time, the state had not developed its own criteria or regulations related to tribal recognition. The state resolution also requested federal recognition of the Ramapough but is non-binding in that regard. The state of New Jersey has also recognized the Nanticoke Lenni-Lenape, who it says share Lenape ancestry with the Ramapough.

==== Commission on Native American Affairs ====
Because of increased issues related to Native Americans, the state of New Jersey created the Commission on Native American Affairs by P.L.1134, c. 295, and it was signed into law on December 22, 1995, by Governor Christine Todd Whitman.

==== Withdrawal and reinstatement of recognition (2012 – 2019) ====
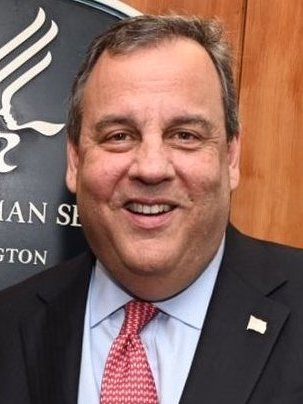
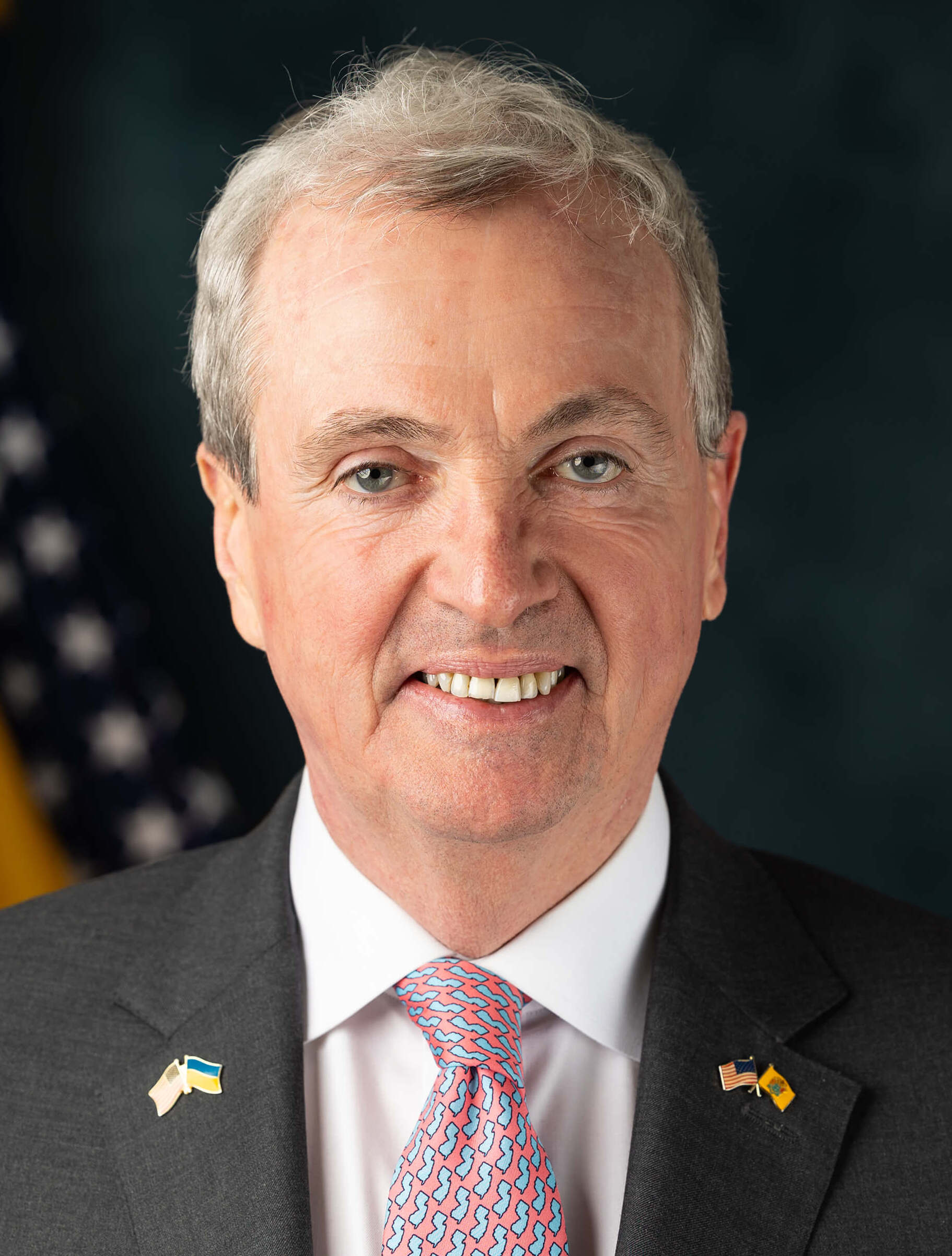
Chris Christie withdrew recognition of the tribe in 2012. They were re-recognized by Phil Murphy in 2019.

In 2012 during the governorship of Chris Christie, Christie said the state of New Jersey had no recognized tribes in a filing to the federal government. The Ramapough said they required state recognition to obtain healthcare, education, and career training grants, as well as the right to sell their crafts as Native American-made. They also said that Christie had permitted state bureaucrats to deny their status when communicating with agencies at state and federal levels.

Their recognition was restored during the governorship of Phil Murphy, after recognition was restored to the Nanticoke Lenni-Lenape. When affirming their recognition, Attorney General Gurbir Grewal said the tribes had agreed that state recognition did not grand them the right to open casinos.

=== Attempts for recognition in New York ===
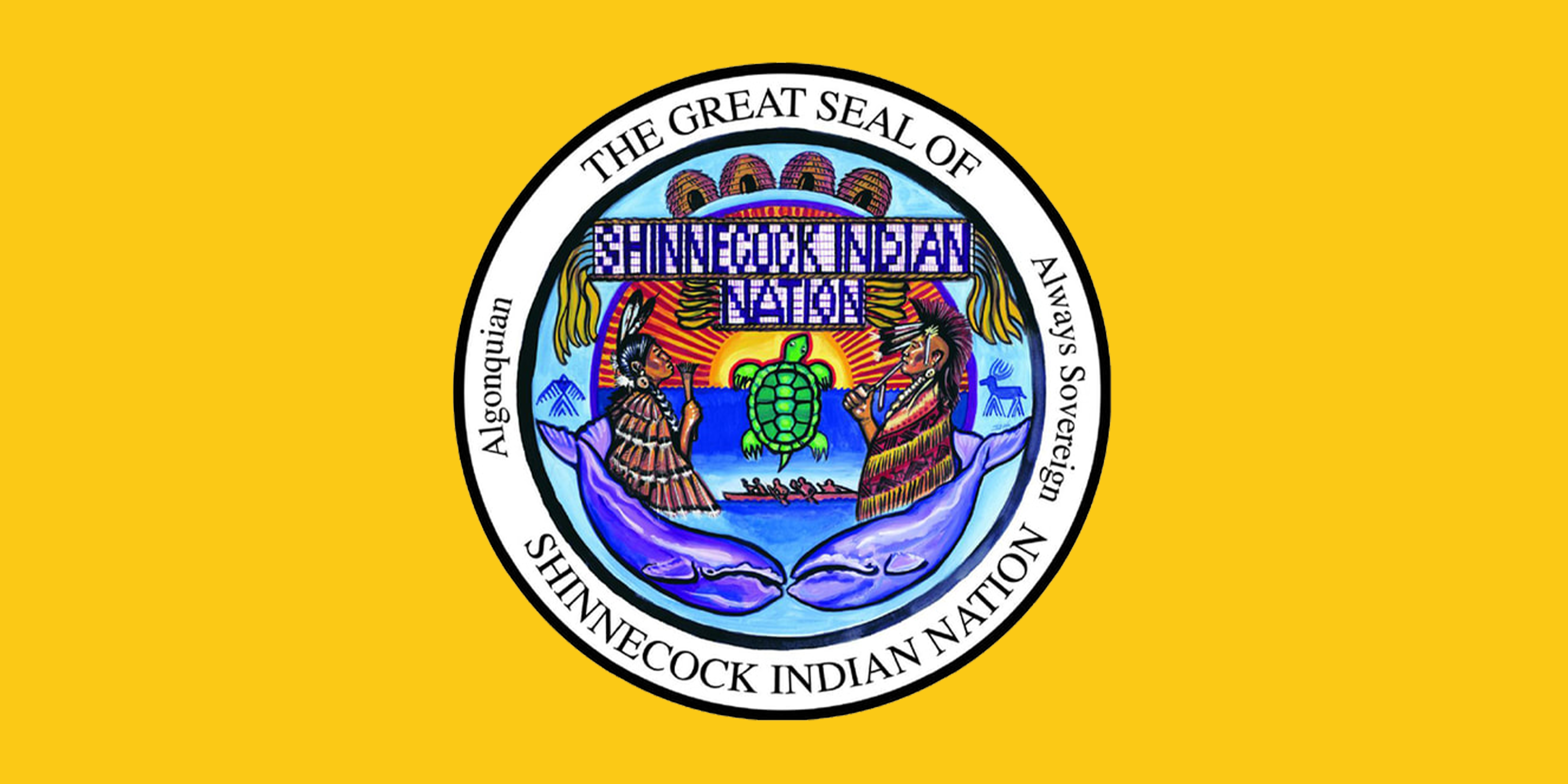
The Shinnecock are recognized in New York, but the Ramapough are unrecognized in the state.

The Ramapough Indians claim to have been recognized by the state of New York by Legislative Resolution 86 in 1979. According to Alexa Koenig and Jonathan Stein, who have reviewed state recognition processes, New York uses a hybrid recognition process based on historic relationships with tribes.

The New York State Gaming Commission states that New York only enters into relationships with federally recognized tribes as policy. However, it says it has relationships with the Shinnecock and Poospatuck (state recognized) due to their historic relationships with the state. They say that the Ramapough have been unsuccessful in achieving state-recognition. (Note: Scholar Renate Bartl writes that requirements for state-recognition in New York are more restrictive and stringent than those in New Jersey, which she says has lax criteria for recognition.) In 2009, the New York legislature had a bill pending to recognize the Ramapough people as Native Americans.

As of 2021, they are not recognized in New York.

=== Petition for federal recognition ===
In August 1978, the Ramapough Mountain Indians (RMI) filed a letter of intent to petition for federal recognition as a tribe. They did not submit a documented petition until April 23, 1990. On June 15, 1990, the Bureau of Indian Affairs (BIA) responded with a letter outlining the deficiencies in the petition. During the process, it repeatedly offered to have representatives meet with the tribe to review topics of research, specifically court records and land deeds, for the period between 1750 and 1820, in which records are scarce. The RMI submitted a partial response on January 28, 1991. A fully revised petition was determined to be ready for active consideration on March 5, 1992. The petition had active consideration status on July 14, 1992.

In December 1993, the BIA issued its proposed finding, rejecting the tribe's petition. The finding said the documented petition did not satisfy all the regulatory criteria, and identified areas of weakness. The BIA granted the tribe an opportunity to respond, including extensions requested by the tribe.

==== Final Determination against Federal Acknowledgment of the Ramapough Mountain Indians, Inc. ====
Full document for the Final Determination.

The Final Determination against Federal Acknowledgment of the Ramapough Mountain Indians, Inc. was issued by the Bureau of Indian Affairs in December 1995. It concluded that the Ramapough Mountain Indians had failed to meet three of seven criteria for recognition; namely, that it did not provide adequate proof of descent from a historical tribe, nor of genealogical, social, and political continuity since 1950. The latter two issues were of concern since 1950, when the Office of Federal Acknowledgment felt that the tribe had not demonstrated a distinct Indian culture different from its neighbors. They concluded:

In conclusion, the origins and parentage of the earliest genealogically proven ancestors of the petitioner are not known. The petitioner has not demonstrated that their earliest documented ancestors were members of a historical North American Indian tribe, nor has the petitioner documented that their earliest proven progenitors descended from any known historical tribe of North American Indians. Without documentation, the BIA cannot make an assumption, on the basis of late 19th-century and early 20th-century ascriptions, that these unknown RMI ancestors were members of a historical North American Indian tribe. The petitioner has not presented acceptable evidence that the RMI descend from a historical Indian tribe, or from tribes that amalgamated and functioned as a single unit, either as individuals or as a group.

This Final Determination survived an internal BIA appeal in 1997, and a federal court appeal in 2001.

==== D.C. Court of Appeals judgement ====
The Ramapough Mountain Indians appealed the BIA's decision. In November 2001, the Ramapough presented their case to the D.C. Court of Appeals. The Court upheld the judgement, stating that they could not conclude the Secretary had made an arbitrary judgement or error on the Ramapough by requiring documentation, as the regulations require documentation of tribal descent.

=== Oversight hearing before the Subcommittee on Native American Affairs ===
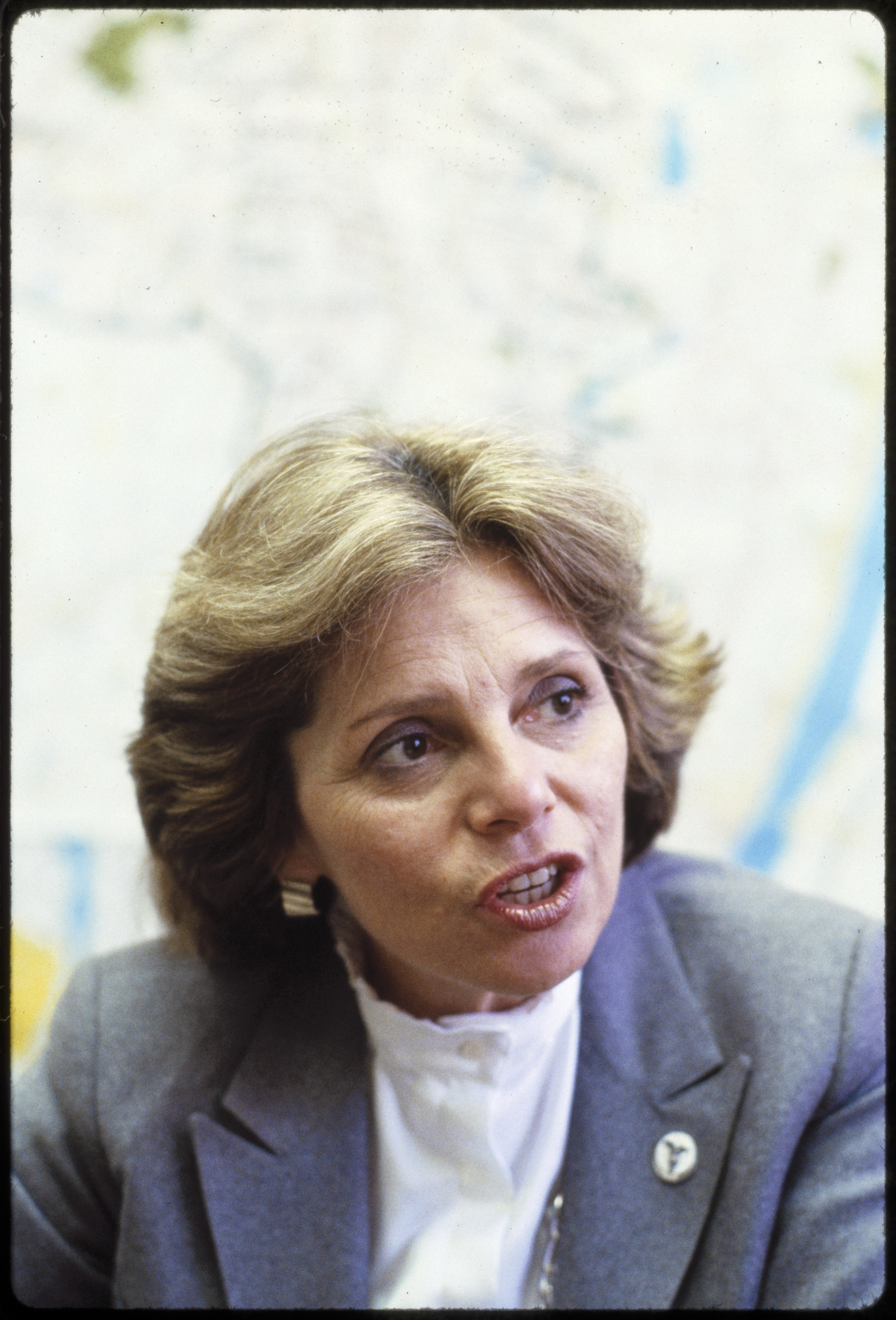
Congresswoman Marge Roukema testified against the Ramapough.

U.S. Representative Marge Roukema testified to the U.S. Senate Subcommittee on Native American Affairs on October 5, 1993, about the Ramapough Lenape Indian efforts to gain recognition. She said that, since tribal representatives had approached her during the 1980s seeking a private federal bill for recognition, their "sole interest" appeared to be to establish casino gambling in Bergen County, and that they did not contact her regarding housing or education.

Roukema testified that the Ramapough had contracted a Robert Frank to finance their bid for recognition in return for 49% of their future gaming profits. She also testified that Frank had recently resigned from his previous firm due to criminal allegations related to Native American gaming in California.

Referencing a report from the New Jersey Law Journal, she said Frank had a long-standing relationship with Anthony Accetturo of the Lucchese crime family. She said she was worried that federal acknowledgement of the Ramapough would bring organized crime along with Native American gaming to northern New Jersey.

=== External commentary ===
In April 1993, Donald Trump (then a casino owner) and two Bergen County United States Representatives said that "the Ramapo would bring in Indian gaming associated with organized crime".

Roger D. Joslyn, a certified genealogist and one of the consultants to the tribe in their petition, wrote he had traced Ramapough members to people in the 18th century. He said that tribal members were descended from the historical Munsee tribe.

==== After rejection ====
John "Bud" Shapard was the former chief of the Bureau of Research at the BIA from 1978 to 1987, when the regulations were written. Asked to examine the Ramapough's case after the BIA declined their petition, in 1999 he said, "It's pretty clear they've got an Indian community as strong as some that have been recognized. There's no question about that."

Alexa Koenig and Jonathan Stein wrote an article published in 2007 in which they reviewed the process of federal and state recognition, and factors affecting both. They wrote that the political environment slowed recognition of tribes due to fears of casino establishments, and that this was sometimes financed by competing Native American casinos. They said this prevented non-casino benefits, such as federal grants and immunities from being conferred to tribes. They also wrote that states had initiated their own processes of recognition of tribes and were building new relationships with them.

Scholar Jeroen Dewulf writes that research pointing to the Ramapough descending from free Black people in New Netherland led to difficulties in their recognition process.

== History and scholarship ==
=== Historic Ramapo ===
In 1986 archeologist Herbert C. Kraft said that some Ramapough lived in the mountains by the mid- to late seventeenth century and theorized they were joined by remnants of the Esopus and possibly Wappinger bands after wars with the Dutch. He later stated in the 1990s that he had limited knowledge on the Ramapough. The Lenape language in this area was Munsee.

Wynant Van Gelder, the first European landowner in what became Sloatsburg in Rockland County, New York, was noted as having bought land from the Ramapough in 1738.

Archaeologist Edward J. Lenik wrote in his book about the Ramapough Mountain Indians that the archaeological record indicated a continuous presence of Native bands in the northern Highlands province in the 18th century, and historical accounts from the 19th-20th centuries had accounts of Natives in the highlands. He proposed all residents of the Ramapo Mountains had Native American progenitors, rather than just the Ramapough Mountain Indians.

=== Settlers in the Tappan Patent ===
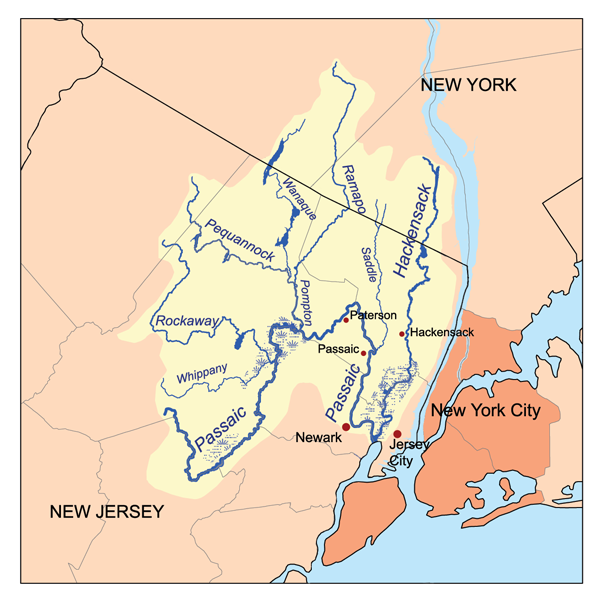
The Hackensack and Ramapo rivers. The Office of Federal Acknowledgement documented the ancestors of the Ramapough having lived in the Ramapo River valley before they migrated into the mountains.

After selling their land on areas like Collect Pond, free Black people migrated with Dutch settlers as they left New York City to rural areas of New York and New Jersey. The historian David Cohen found that early settlers in the Hackensack Valley included free Black people residing on the outskirts of New York City. Among these was Augustine Van Donck, who bought land in the Tappan Patent in 1687. (Note: The surname Van Dunk is common among the Ramapough.) As slave codes restricted the movement of free Black people across the New York-New Jersey border, Cohen suggests that some of these early landowners relocated west into the mountains. He writes that he traced the families of the Ramapo Mountain people back to these landowners, and that three of their families were original signatories to the Tappan Patent.

==== Discussion and analysis ====
Cohen wrote in 1974 that, as the federal censuses of 1790–1830 were missing for this area, it prevented "establishing positively the exact relationship between many of these colored families in the mountains, and the earlier colored families of the Hackensack River Valley". He says that the documentation is clear in one case, when John Van Donk migrated from Orange County in 1800 to Pompton Township in 1830, near the Ringwood iron mines.

The Office of Federal Acknowledgment acknowledges an established Afro-Dutch history of the Ramapough Van Dunk family. They write that in the early 1800s the ancestors of the Ramapo were well-documented living in the Ramapo river valley among settlers, as well as to the east in Bergen County, in addition to residing in Rockland County towns. They record the families in the valley moving into the mountains by 1850. In addition, they observed the other families migrating into the valley, then the mountains only after 1850.

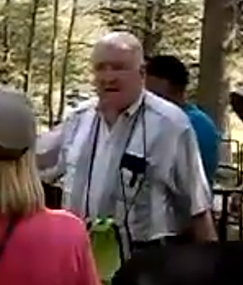
Lenik writes the Ramapough descend from the Munsee.

Edward J. Lenik, a self-taught private archaeologist, disagrees with Cohen's findings about African-European ancestry.

He says, "While the Ramapough's origins are controversial, most historians and anthropologists agree that they (Ramapough) are the descendants from local Munsee-speaking Lenape (Delaware) Indians who fled to the mountains in the late seventeenth century to escape Dutch and English settlers. It is a well known fact that displacement of Indian tribes followed European Incursions in the region which resulted in the forced movement and resettlement of Indian peoples."

Cohen said one or more marriages with Native Americans were possible, but argued there was no evidence of such, as they were not recorded in church records. He labelled them as being initially Afro-Dutch, attending Dutch Reformed church, having Dutch surnames, and speaking a Black variety of Jersey Dutch. In the Ramapo Mountains, Cohen writes they shifted to an Appalachian identity.

=== Ramapo Mountain People ===
The Ramapough Mountain Indians originate from the Ramapough Mountain people, an ethnic group historically residing in the Ramapo Mountains. Not all Ramapo Mountain people identify as Lenape or Native American, and not all of them went on to become members of the Ramapough Mountain Indians. Some do not claim any Native ancestry.

==== Pejorative labels ====
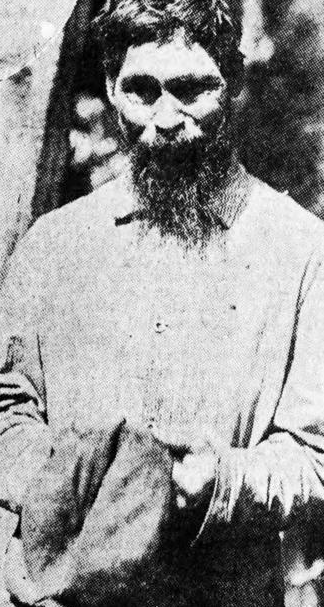
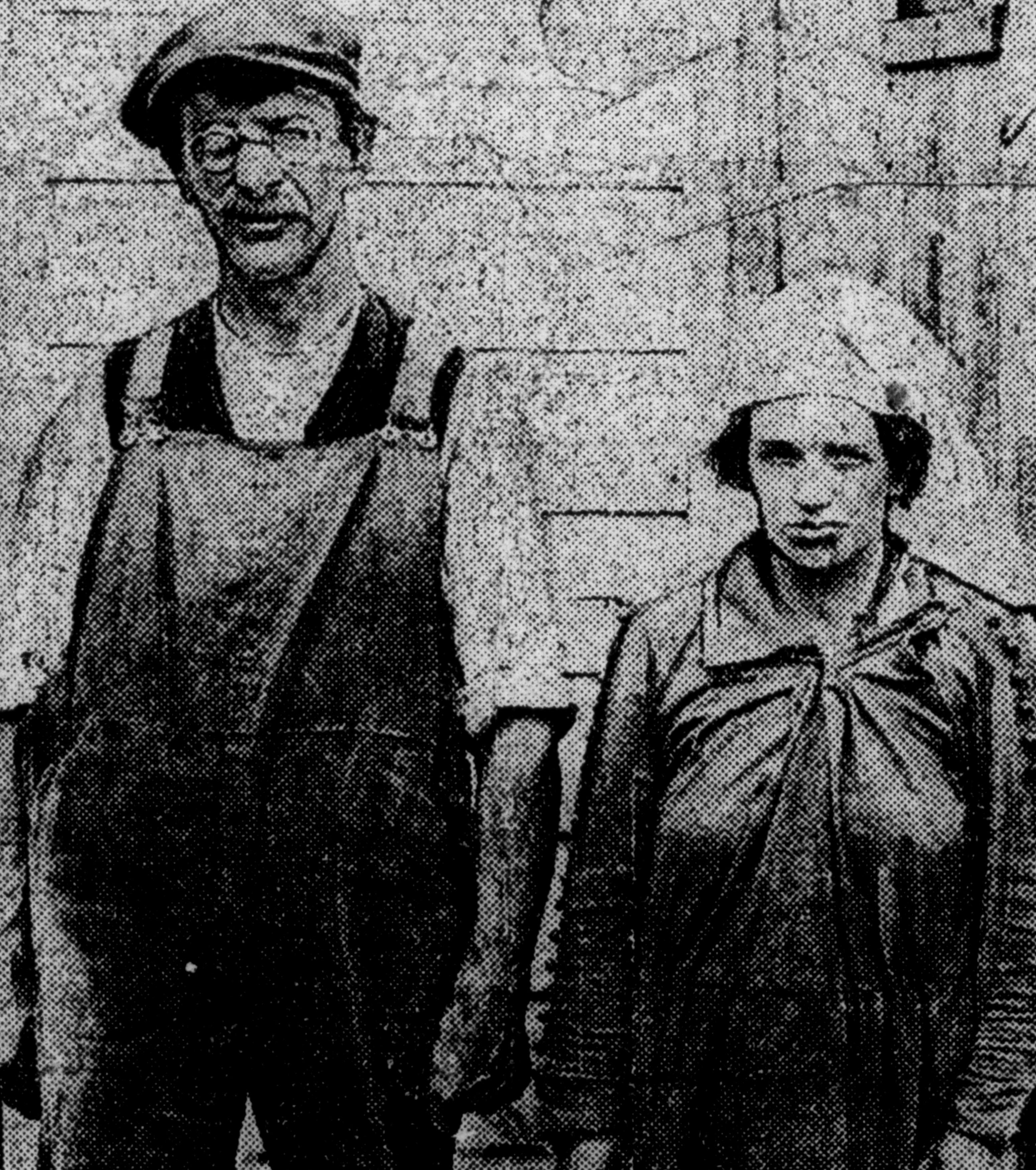
People labelled "Jackson White" in the early 20th century. On the left is a mixed-race man, and on the right is a white family. Cohen writes that the exonym applied to the Ramapo Mountain people, but also unrelated white families living near Ladentown.

The Ramapo Mountain people were often referred to historically as the Jackson Whites, a term that they regard as being derogatory. In 1880, The Bergen Democrat was the first newspaper to print the term Jackson Whites. A 1911 article noted it was used as a title of contempt. The etymology of the name is uncertain with sources stating the name was either from the Jackson White heirloom potato or a distortion of Jacks and Whites, referring to their multiracial ancestry. Another historical pejorative was "Buckos", which is of unknown origins. Not all families labelled as "Jackson Whites" were Ramapo Mountain people.

==== Early anthropological reports ====
During the twentieth century, anthropologists classified historically isolated and endogamous mixed-race groups as racial isolates or "mixed bloods". In 1936, newspaper editor John C. Storms published the booklet "The Origin of the Jackson-Whites of the Ramapo Mountains", where he espoused various theories of origin of the group. The New Jersey historian David S. Cohen said these theories were oral traditions which had emerged between 1870-1920. The earliest reference he found dated to 1872.

Partly because of the people's multiracial ancestry, some assumed they were descendants of runaway or freed slaves ("Jacks" in slang) and Caucasians. Over time, the latter were believed to have included Dutch slaves and Hessian soldiers. The people supposedly fled to frontier areas of the mountains after the end of the Revolutionary War. Thousands of escaped slaves had gone to British-occupied New York City on the promise of freedom, and some left the city for more isolated areas to escape capture after the war. There is no documentation of slaves, freed or runaway, nor of Hessian soldiers' marrying into the tribe. The group rejects these legends as pejorative.

Cohen wrote that legends of origin given for the "Jackson Whites" were untrue, and his statements were then repeated by local news outlets. He said locals were happy with his refutations.

==== Identification as Ramapo Mountain People ====
Ramapo Mountain People
The Mountain People
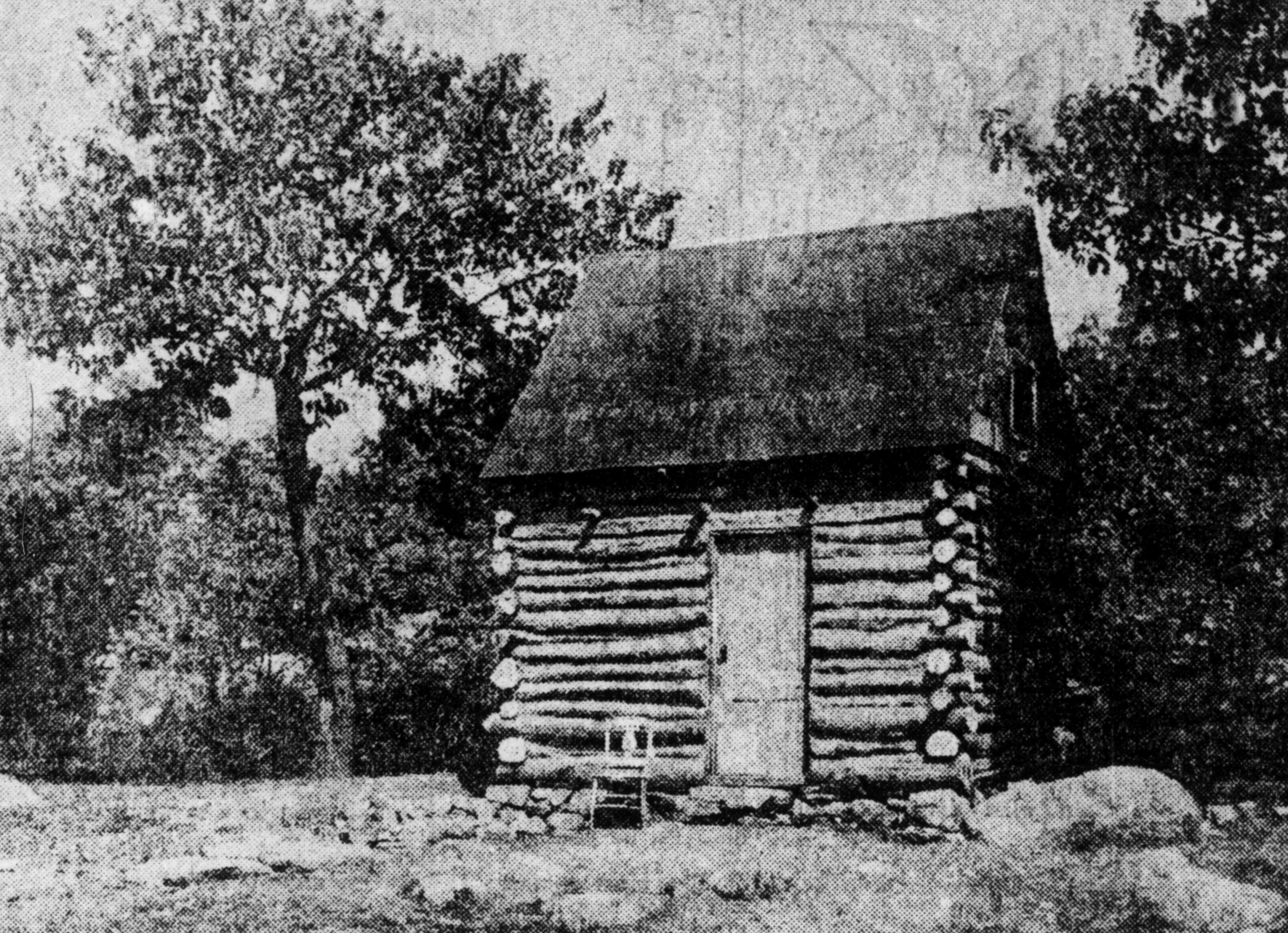
- Log cabin of a member of the DeGroat family.

Total population
- 1913 (est.): 2,611
- 1950 (census): 1,280
- 1974 (est.): 1,500

Regions with significant populations
- New Jersey, New York

Languages
- English, formerly Jersey Dutch

Religion
- Pentecostal, Presbyterian, Episcopal, African Methodist Episcopal, and Dutch Reformed (ancestrally) (Note: David Cohen writes the ancestors of the Ramapo Mountain people were affiliated with Dutch Reformed churches.)

Related ethnic groups
- Melungeons, Lumbee, Wesorts, Redbones, Delaware Moors, Brass Ankles
- Not all Ramapo Mountain people are members of the Ramapough Mountain Indians.

David Cohen used the term Ramapo Mountain People for the mixed-race group previously described as "Jackson Whites", but not for the unrelated white families. He writes that some of the group's ancestors were multiracial, free Afro-Dutch pioneers who had migrated from lower Manhattan to the frontier and become landowners in the Tappan Patent during the seventeenth century.

Scholars Fuchs, Dewulf, and Cohen said that their migration to the Ramapo Mountains was due to laws in New Jersey restricting free Black people. This included the right to move across county lines without a pass. Cohen wrote that since the New York-New Jersey Border divided the Tappan Patent, the free Black people living there faced specific difficulties.

==== Culture ====
Kraft wrote that a report on the Ramapo by linguist John Dyneley Prince demonstrated they spoke a Black variant of Jersey Dutch. Cohen said this variant was called "nexer dauts", and was not a pidgin or creole language like the Dutch creoles of the Caribbean, citing runaway slave ads describing slaves speaking fluent Dutch.

Prince's report recorded a charm to cure rheumatism from the Ramapo William De Freece in Jersey Dutch. It spoke of seven trees standing on something unknown. (Note: The charm was as follows: Altait an zomer - Stat de zuve borne; - Aske’n aike an al de lang vorbai - Kan nit rolle. Wat er opstat? This translates as: [Always in summer - Stand the seven trees; - Ash and oak and all along past - They cannot proceed. What are they standing on?]) Prince expressed the charm was grammatically incorrect. Cohen writes that the charm is a riddle, such that the trees represent stars, which is why they were not standing on anything. He says this could represent a Bakongo Cosmogram, and that historian Robert Farris Thompson had found a version of one with seven stars in Brazil. (Note: Cohen writes Thompson obtained the cosmogram from Macumba priests, and that it depicted six stars surrounding the Star of David.)

The Ramapo Mountain People maintained an Appalachian cultural identity. Ethnomusicologist Charles H. Kaufman recorded them to perform fiddle music. Some songs they played were "The Fisher’s Hornpipe", "The Irish Washerwoman", and "Buck and Wing". They also practiced buck-and-wing dancing. In the 1960s, they enjoyed country and western music.

=== Tribal formation ===
Locations of the three Ramapough communities. Passaic County is highlighted.

The Deer, Fox, and Turtle clans of the tribe were formed in 1978, representing the Ramapo communities of Mahwah, Hillburn, and Ringwood. Kraft wrote that they modelled them after the three known Lenape clans, Wolf, Turkey, and Turtle. The State of New Jersey stated they were of Algonquian and Iroquoian descent in 1980 when it recognized them. Cohen says this broadened their initial legends of Tuscarora ancestry to include Lenape descent. The word Ramapough is the old Dutch spelling of Ramapo.

Renate Bartl writes that the Ramapough initially identified with Tuscarora descent, but had switched to a Lenape identity by the time they were recognized by New Jersey. She said they added a Wappinger identity before petitioning for federal recognition, and have now adopted a Munsee identity.

Bartl writes they adopted their Munsee identity after Cohen revealed their descent from Afro-Dutch in New Amsterdam, as the Munsee inhabited New Amsterdam at the time of Dutch colonization. Herbert C. Kraft wrote their increasing identity as Munsee-Delaware was in response to public awareness that the Munsee had once resided in the Ramapo Mountains.

The Ramapough received classes under the Title IV American Indian Education Program after their recognition in 1980. Kraft taught classes to Ramapo children from 1981–1983, where he disseminated information from his fieldwork with Lenape in Oklahoma. He wrote a storytelling tradition he personally taught a Ramapo student was later cited by Lenik as a cultural survival from their past, using the same student as an informant.

=== Modern discussion of origins ===
With increasing interest and research in Native American history, a symposium was held during 1984 on the Lenape. James Revey (Lone Bear), then chairman of the New Jersey Indian Office, said that "Mountain Indians" were descendants of Lenape who had retreated into the mountains of western and northeastern New Jersey and southwestern New York during the colonial era. Other scholars, such as Herbert C. Kraft, have documented that some Munsee-speaking Lenape relocated into the Ramapo Mountains to escape colonial encroachment. Kraft wrote that observers base Native ancestry in the Ramapough on a possibility, rather than documented evidence.

In 1988, scholar Lawrence Fuchs gave the Ramapough as an example of self-designated change in order to improve status. He wrote that Cohen found that they descended from free Black pioneers, but they instead chose to identify as Indian and incorporate as a tribe. He said school officials were sympathetic as they brought funds to the Mahwah school district for teaching for teaching a Native American curriculum.

==== 21st century analysis ====
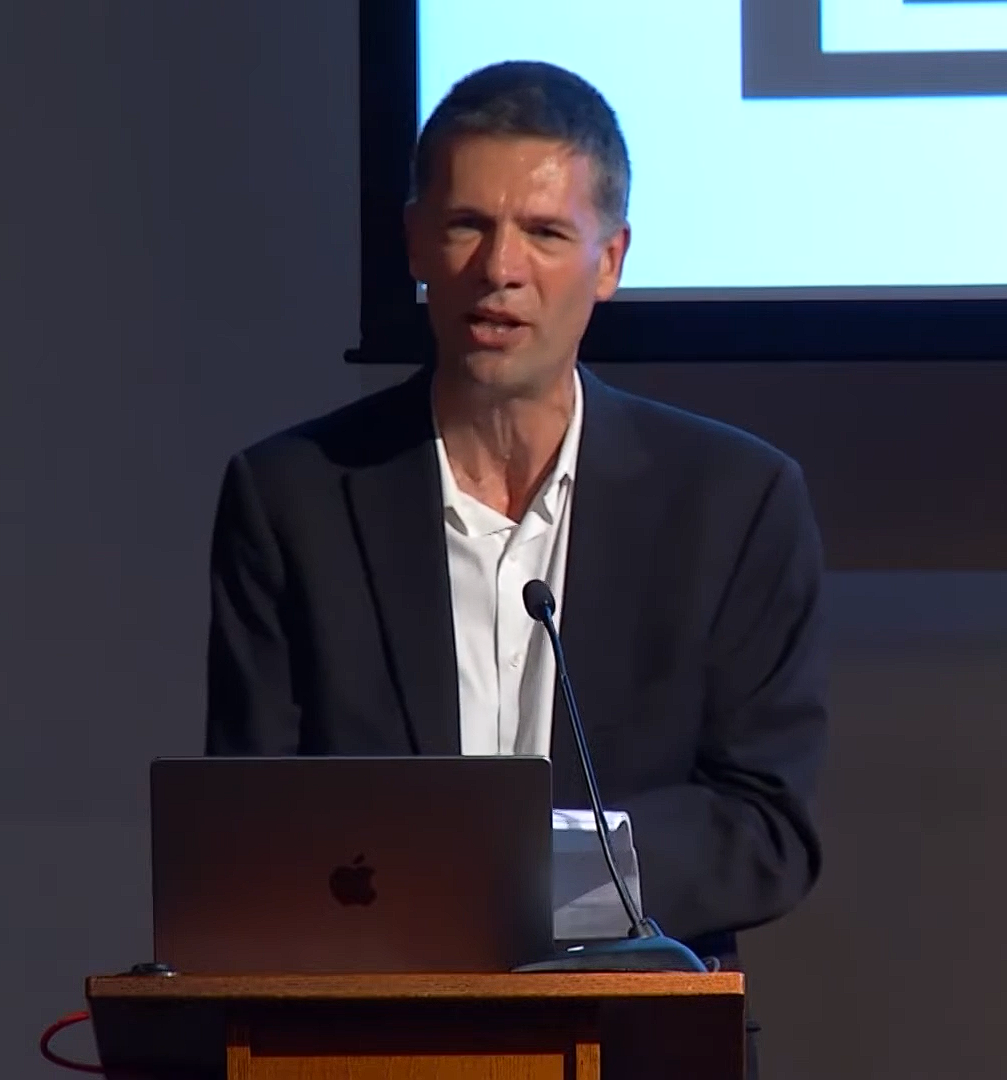
In 2026, scholar Jeroen Dewulf wrote that the Ramapough Mountain people were proven to originate from the free Black community of New Netherland.

Kraft wrote, as did Cohen, that the ancestors of the Ramapough Mountain Indians have the same surnames as 1670s free African-Americans from the Hackensack valley, but that there is a genealogical gap from 1790–1830 which prevented exact individual family lines from being constructed. Historian Andrea Mosterman says Cohen's book on the Ramapo is some of the earlier work on African-Americans in New Netherland, which she says was previously neglected.

Cohen writes that the documentation is clear in one case, when John Van Donk migrated from Orange County in 1800 to Pompton Township in 1830, near the Ringwood iron mines. Kraft wrote that Cohen was able to document the emigration of one Ramapough ancestor from the Hackensack valley, and that the Hackensack landowners were selling their lands at the same time as people with the same names began settling in the Ramapo Mountains. Researcher Paul Heinegg writes that one of the fourteen free African-American families studied by writer Henry B. Hoff has descendants in the Ramapo Mountain people.

Catalano and Planche, legal counsel for the Ramapough Mountain Indians, said that Cohen lacked genealogical credentials, and claimed the BIA found his genealogical work lacking. The historian Evan T. Pritchard wrote that the Ramapough, who he calls the "Mountaineer Munsee", did not disappear from the Ramapo Mountains like the Haverstraw. He says that whites refer to them as Dutch, Black, Tuscarora (Note: The Ramapough Lenape nation claims Tuscarora ancestry.), Roma, and Hessian in origin, but they are instead of local origin. He lists Hillburn, Johnsontown, Furmanville, Sherwoodville, Bulsontown, Willowgrove, Sandyfields, Hillburn, Stagg Hill, Ringwood, and Ladentown as Ramapough Lenape settlements.

Scholar Renate Bartl says the Ramapough Mountain Indians are an example of a multi-ethnic group claiming Native American identity, with a created ethnohistory, rather than a multi-ethnic Native American nation. She says their tribal identity was adopted after checking historical sources and maps to see which tribes lived in their area.

Scholar Jeroen Dewulf writes that Cohen was able to prove the Ramapough Mountain people originated from the free Black community in New Netherland. He said this was met with hostility as they did not live in the same progressive environment as Cohen, where the stereotyping of Black people was less prominent. He says another reason for their reaction was his conclusion that no Native ancestry was in the group, as this undermined attempts by some residents at obtaining recognition as a tribe.

==== Statements by tribes ====
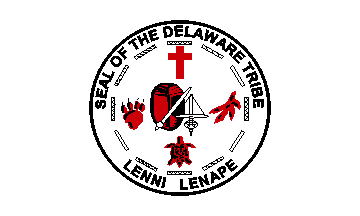
Flag and seal of the Delaware Tribe of Indians.

The federally recognized Delaware Nation regards the Ramapough Mountain Indians as a fraudulent organization, as they have stated that they "do not acknowledge or work with any non-federally recognized groups that claim Lenape identity or nationhood, which includes “state recognized” groups as we do not agree with state recognition." In a 2023 report, the Delaware Nation referred to the Ramapough Mountain Indians as a CPAIN (Corporation Posing as an Indigenous Nation).

The federally recognized Delaware Tribe of Indians has issued a resolution which "denounces fabricated Delaware groups and commits to exposing and assisting state and federal authorities in eradicating any group which attempts or claims to operate as a government of the Delaware people". The resolution refers to Lenape heritage groups and state-recognized tribes in Delaware, New Jersey, New York and Pennsylvania as CPAINs.

== Recent events ==
Some Ramapough Mountain Indians currently live in Rockland County, especially in Hillburn, New York. In 1995, New Jersey established a Commission on American Indian Affairs (then termed the Commission on Native American Affairs) with two seats each for the recognized tribes of the Ramapough Mountain Indians, the Nanticoke Lenni-Lenape, and the Powhatan Renape (the latter two groups are located in southern New Jersey). In addition, two seats were reserved for Inter-Tribal Members, persons who belonged to other tribes but lived in New Jersey. The commission has been placed in the Department of State.

=== Fatal shooting of Emil Mann ===
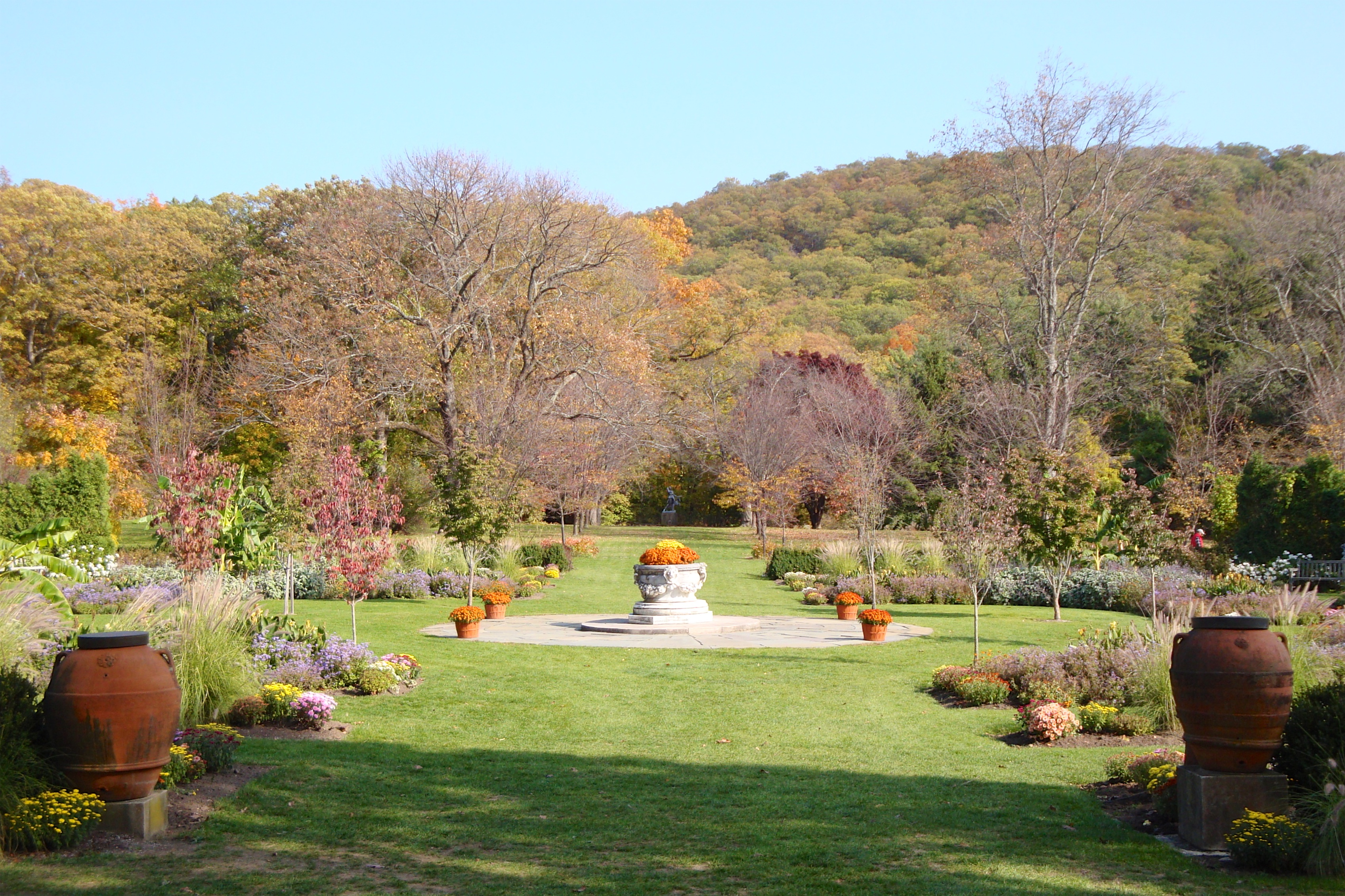
Ramapough member Emil Mann was killed by police in Ringwood State Park.

During the spring of 2006, Emil Mann, a Ramapough Lenape man, was killed by gunshots from a New Jersey State Parks Police ranger in a confrontation with people on all-terrain vehicles in Ringwood State Park. His family filed a civil suit against the state.

Governor Jon Corzine's staff met with the Ramapough Lenape and other Native Americans in the state to identify problem areas and improve relations. The state investigated the shooting, and a grand jury indicted one of the rangers.

=== State initiatives ===
During August 2006, Governor Corzine formed the New Jersey Committee on Native American Community Affairs to investigate issues of civil rights, education, employment, fair housing, environmental protection, health care, infrastructure, and equal opportunity confronting members of New Jersey's three State-recognized tribes and other New Jersey residents of Native American descent.

State and federal officials have worked with the tribes on other issues related to their people. In preparation for the 2010 census, state and federal officials consulted with the recognized tribes on means to get accurate counts of their people. The Census Bureau has created local partnerships. It recognizes State Designated Tribal Statistical Areas, which are established by state consultation with local tribes to identify significant areas of American Indian populations outside reservations (these had not been examined during the twentieth century). In New Jersey, these are identified as Passaic and Bergen counties for the Ramapough Mountain Tribe and Cumberland County for the Nanticoke Lenni-Lenape.

=== Environmental concerns ===
==== Toxic dumping by the Ford Motor Company (Mann v. Ford) ====
Members of the community have participated in litigation (Mann v. Ford) against the Ford Motor Company regarding poisoning from a former toxic waste landfill. Portions of this site were used during the 1970s as sites for affordable housing where many Ramapough people lived.

During the 1980s, the Environmental Protection Agency designated the Ringwood Mines landfill site as a Superfund site for cleanup. Ford had operated an automobile assembly plant in Mahwah, and its contractors dumped industrial paints and other hazardous wastes in a landfill owned by the company in an area where many Ramapough Mountain Indians live. The EPA identified further remediation three more times as additional sludge sites were found. Following further investigation, the EPA returned the community to the Superfund list, the only site to be so treated.

During late winter 2006, some 600 Ramapough Lenape Indians filed a mass tort suit (Mann v. Ford) against the "Ford Motor Company and its contractors, as well as the borough of Ringwood, for the dumping of toxic waste." They were represented by Vicki Gilliam of The Cochran Group, Robert F. Kennedy, Jr.'s law firm. The suit was filed about the time of publication of Toxic Legacy, a five-part investigative series by The Record, which had found lead and antimony levels in excess of 100 times the safety limit near some Ramapough residences.

The paint sludge has been linked to contamination of food and water sources with lead and benzene. The contamination has been linked to nosebleeds, leukemia, and other ailments among the community. EPA confirmed the area was still contaminated with industrial and hazardous waste after four cleanups and placed the site back on the Superfund priority list. From 2006 to 2011, the EPA has directed the removal of an additional 47,000 tonnes (104,000,000 lb) of contaminated earth and sludge from the site, more than five times what was cleaned up in the first efforts.

The HBO documentary Mann v. Ford (2011) examines the lawsuit. During the 2008–2010 automotive industry crisis, at a time when it appeared that Ford might be in danger of going bankrupt, the Ramapough feared that the company might not be around much longer. Ford used this to their advantage in settlement negotiations. The tribe accepted a settlement in September 2009 of $11 million from Ford and its contractors, plus $1.5 million from the town of Ringwood, for an average payout of $8,000 per Ramapough resident after attorney fees.

==== Pipeline protests and opposition ====
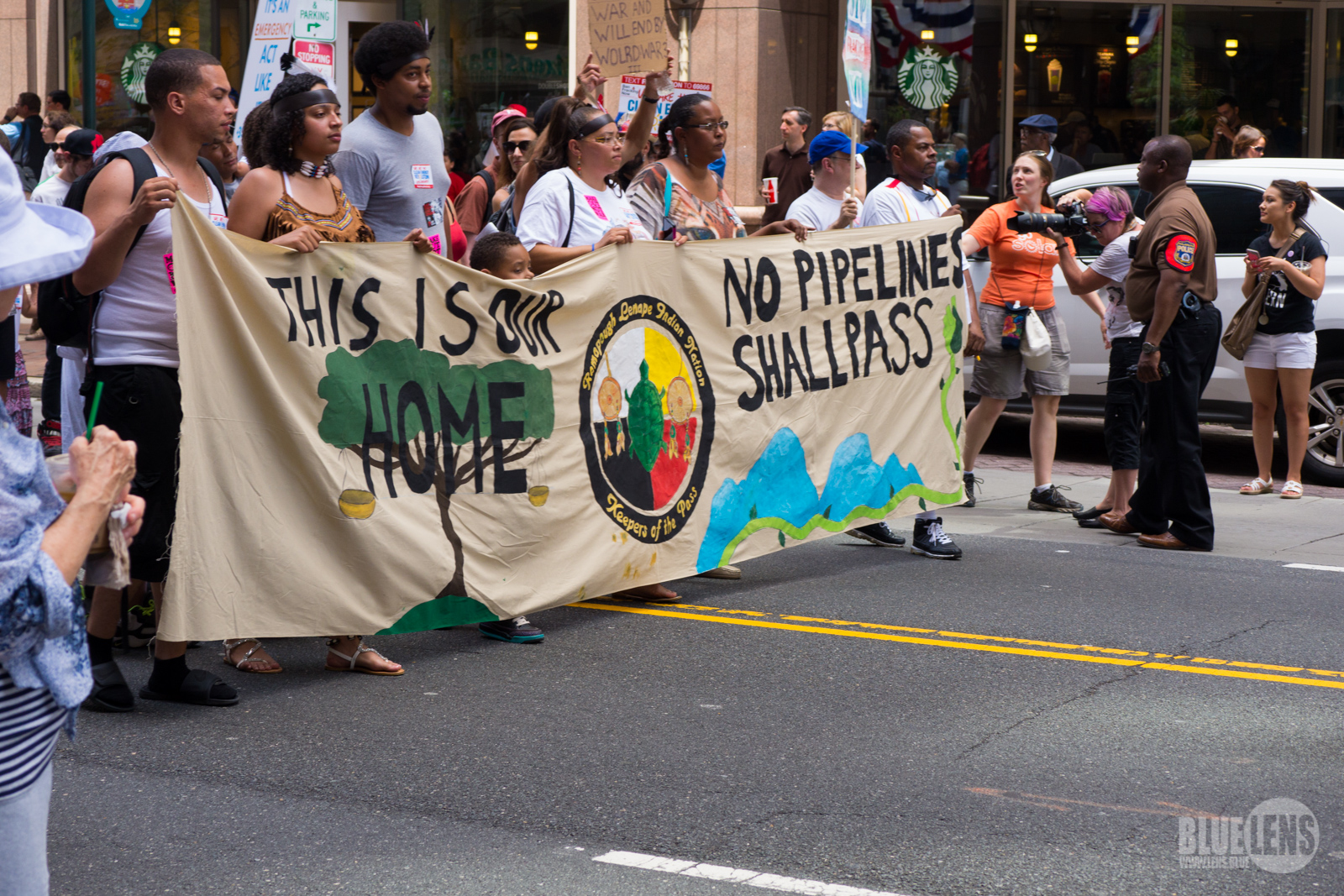
Ramapough Lenape Nation marching at a 2016 Dakota Access Pipeline protests in Philadelphia.

Between 2016 and 2017, the tribe fought against the Pilgrim Pipeline. Pilgrim Pipelines Holdings, LLC, planned to run a dual pipeline through the tribe's land that would carry refined products like gasoline, diesel, kerosene, aviation fuel, and home heating oil north, and Bakken formation crude oil south, between Albany, New York, and the Bayway Refinery on the Chemical Coast in Linden, New Jersey.

The line would also pass through the Ramapo Mountains and Ramapo Pass. In solidarity with Standing Rock, tribal members founded the Split Rock Sweetwater protest encampment in Mahwah, New Jersey, in 2016 near the New York border to protest the Pilgrim Pipeline. Plans for the pipeline were eventually abandoned, with Pilgrim Pipelines Holdings' website defunct as of 2021.

=== Leadership disputes ===
Two former chiefs of the Ramapough Mountain Indians have been ousted from the tribe, Anthony Jay Van Dunk and Dwaine Perry.

==== Barring of Anthony Jay Van Dunk ====
While he was chief in 2017, Dwaine Perry said former chief Jay Van Dunk had been banished from the tribe after a vote. Perry had previously been voted in as chief instead of Van Dunk. Perry criticized Van Dunk's handling of the tribe's finances, referring to him as a "confidence man".

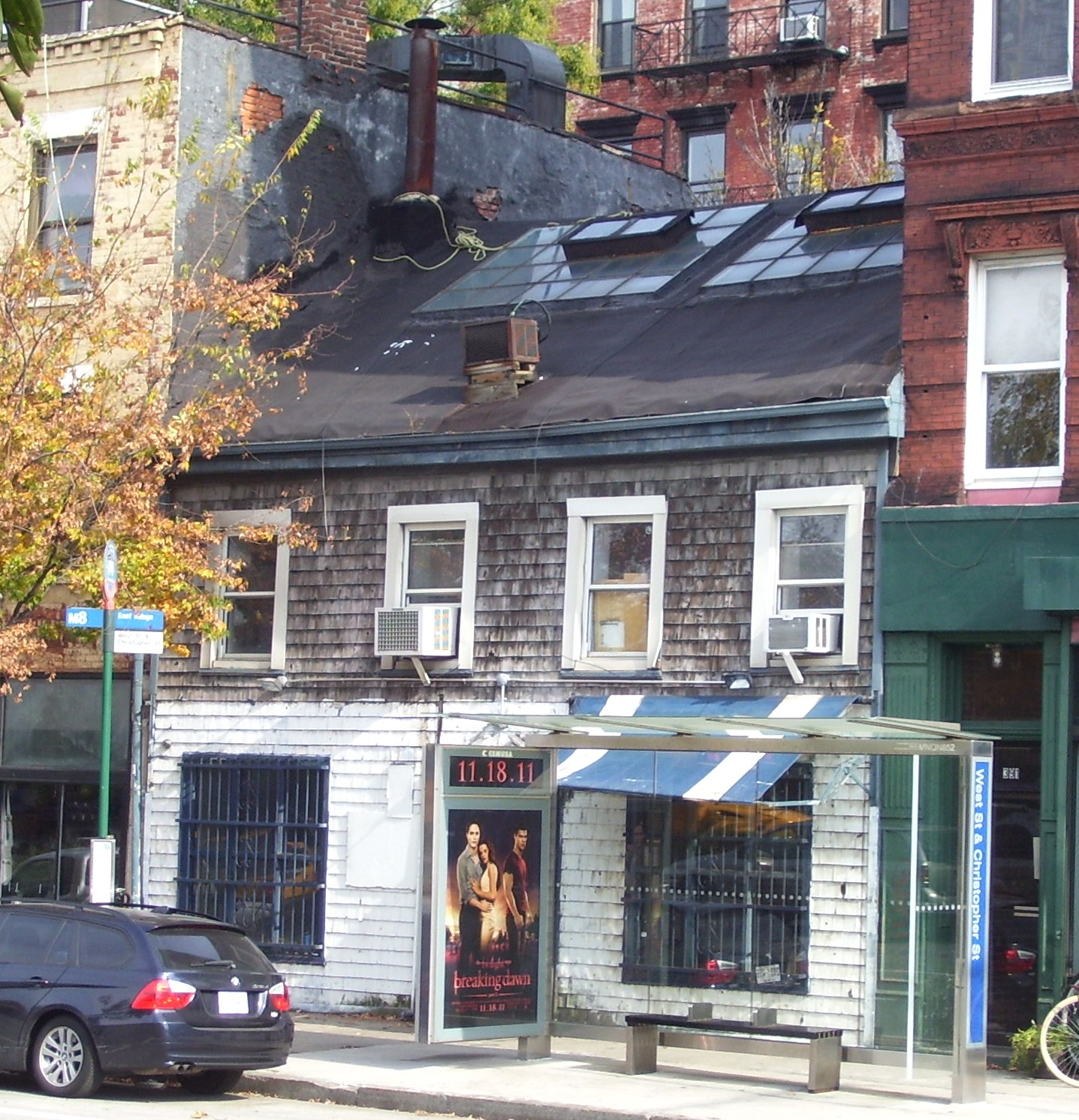
The 6 Weehawken Street building from the south. Bourgeois later reneged on his offer.

After millionaire Jean-Louis Bourgeois expressed his intent to donate the 6 Weehawken Street building to Van Dunk for a prayer center, Perry requested it be given to the tribe instead as an embassy. He received no response. Van Dunk referred to his being barred from the tribe as a political vendetta by Perry. Bourgeois said he considered Anthony to be the chief.

==== Ousting of Dwaine Perry ====
In 2025, former chief Dwaine Perry said he was ousted by rival members in an illegal takeover. He was arrested on July 22, 2025 at the Ramapough tribal headquarters under charge of criminal trespass. He claimed this occurred due to rival members falsely informing police he was not allowed on tribal property.

Perry filed a lawsuit against rival members. His attorney Lydia Cotz stated the suit was for defamation, and that she believed he would be reinstated. The suit alleged members, some possibly unenrolled, were permitted to vote him out as chief and voted in Vincent Mann, which occurred while he was not present. The suit sought to reinstate Perry and others to their previous positions, award damages to Perry, and prevent tribal members from controlling the official nonprofit.

The case was dismissed in 2026. A lawyer for the tribe says the court decided the dispute should be solved through the tribal process itself, not courts. Cotz says her firm is appealing the judgement, and that the defamation case is not dismissed, and still in the discovery phase.

== Representation in media ==
=== Movies ===
- Mann v. Ford (2011) is a documentary about the lawsuit filed by the Ramapough Lenape Indian Nation against Ford. Directed by Maro Chermayeff and Mica Fink, it features Paul Mann of the Ramapough and Vicki Gilliam of The Cochran Firm, which represented the tribe. It portrays the five years of the Ramapough pursuing the suit and how they reached a settlement with the company.
- American Native (2013) is a documentary that details the Ramapough Lenape Nation's efforts to gain federal recognition as a Native American nation and the difficulties it has encountered due to loss of lands and records and alleged racism.
- The movie Out of the Furnace (2013) is a fictional drama dealing partly with communities living in the Ramapough Mountains, featuring Christian Bale, Woody Harrelson, and Willem Dafoe. Tribal leaders and town officials from Mahwah urged a boycott of the movie due to negative depictions of the Ramapough Lenape Nation, which was termed a hate crime. Relativity Media responded that the movie "is not based on any one person or group" and is "entirely fictional". Nine members of the group, eight of whom have the surname DeGroat, which is given to the movie's antagonist, filed suit against the makers and other involved parties. They claimed that Out of the Furnace portrays a gang of criminals living in the Ramapo Mountains who are "lawless, drug-addicted, impoverished and violent". On May 16, 2014, U.S. District Court Judge William Walls, in Newark, New Jersey, dismissed the lawsuit, saying that the movie did not refer directly to any of the plaintiffs.
- The Way of the Ramapough (2022), a 30-minute documentary by Elliott Ruga, produced by the New Jersey Highlands Coalition, based on an interview with Turtle Clan Chief Vincent Mann discussing tribal history from first contact through contemporary times and the effects of colonialism. The documentary includes the dispossession of Native lands and the resulting diaspora, massacres, rejection of native identity, the attempt at federal recognition, and the ongoing federal and state failures to address the toxic contamination by the Ford Motor Company.

=== Television ===
- The Red Road (2014) is a six-part HBO/SundanceTV made for television miniseries.

== See also ==
- Carmel Melungeons – Mixed-race ethnicity in Kentucky and Ohio from the antebellum era
- Black Dutch (genealogy) – Polyphyletic ethnonym in the United States
- Delaware Moors – American ethnic group
- Haliwa-Saponi Indian Tribe – State-recognized tribe in North Carolina, United States
- Lenape Nation of Pennsylvania – Cultural organization in Pennsylvania
- Lenape Indian Tribe of Delaware – State-recognized tribe and non-profit organization in Delaware
- Lumbee – Mixed-race ethnic group in North Carolina
- Melungeon – Mixed-race group from the South Central Appalachian region of the United States
- Monacan Indian Nation – Native American tribe in Virginia, U.S.
- Nanticoke Indian Association – State-recognized tribe and non-profit organization in Delaware, US
- Person County Indians – State-recognized tribe in North Carolina, United States
- Piscataway-Conoy Tribe of Maryland – State-recognized tribe and non-profit organization based in Maryland
- Piscataway Indian Nation and Tayac Territory – State-recognized tribe in Maryland, US
- Brandywine people – Mixed-race group of people in southern Maryland
- Powhatan Renape Nation – State-recognized tribe in New Jersey

== Sources ==
- Penford, Saxby Voulaer., "Romantic Suffern: The History of Suffern, New York, from the Earliest Times to the Incorporation of the Village in 1896", Tallman, N.Y., 1955, (1st Edition), Chapter 6 Ramapo Mountain Folk
- Bartl, Renate (2021). American Tri-Racials: African-Native Contact, Multi-Ethnic Native American Nations, and the Ethnogenesis of Tri-Racial Groups in North America (PDF) (PhD thesis). Munich: Ludwig-Maximilians-Universität München. doi:10.5282/edoc.26874 – via Electronic Theses of LMU Munich.
- Cohen, David Stephen (1974). The Ramapo Mountain People. New Brunswick, New Jersey: Rutgers University Press. ISBN 0-8135-0768-5 – via Internet Archive.
- Deer, Ada E., ed. (December 1993). Proposed Finding - Ramapough Mountain Indians, Inc (PDF). Office of Federal Acknowledgement (Report). Washington D.C.: United States Department of the Interior.
- Deer, Ada E., ed. (14 January 1996). Final Determination against Federal Acknowledgment of the Ramapough Mountain Indians, Inc (PDF). Office of Federal Acknowledgement (Report). Washington D.C.: United States Department of the Interior.
- Deer, Ada E., ed. (1998). Reconsidered Final Determination Declining to Acknowledge that Ramapough Mountain Indians, Inc. Exists as an Indian Tribe (PDF). Office of Federal Acknowledgement (Report). Washington D.C.: United States Department of the Interior.
- Henige, David (1984). "Origin Traditions of American Racial Isolates: A Case of Something Borrowed". Appalachian Journal. 11 (3). Chapel Hill, North Carolina: University of North Carolina Press: 201–213.
- Kraft, Herbert C. (2001). The Lenape-Delaware Indian Heritage: 10,000 B.C. - A.D. 2000. Lenape Books. ISBN 9780935137033.
- Cohen, David Stephen (1995). Folk Legacies Revisited. New Brunswick, New Jersey: Rutgers University Press. ISBN 0-8135-2139-4.
- Heinegg, Paul (October 2004). "Freedom in the Archives: Free African Americans in Colonial America". Commonplace: The Journal of Early American Life. 5 (1).
- Koenig, Alexa; Stein, Jonathan (2008). "Federalism and the State Recognition of Native American Tribes: A Survey of State-Recognized Tribes and State Recognition Processes Across the United States". Santa Clara Law Review. 48 (1). Santa Clara, California: Santa Clara University School of Law: 79–154. doi:10.2139/ssrn.968495.
- Subcommittee on Native American Affairs (1993). Implementation of Indian Gaming Regulatory Act: Oversight Hearing Before the Subcommittee on Native American Affairs of the Committee on Natural Resources of the House of Representatives, One Hundred Third Congress, First Session, on Implementation of Public Law 100-497, the Indian Gaming Regulatory Act of 1988, and Related Law Enforcement Issues. Washington, D.C.: U.S. Government Publishing Office. ISBN 0160414458. OCLC 1046638229 – via Internet Archive.
- Collins, Daniel (1972). "The Racially-Mixed People of the Ramapos: Undoing the Jackson White Legends". American Anthropologist. 74 (5): 1276–1285. ISSN 0002-7294.
