= Green Post =

The Green Post (German: "Die Grüne Post") was a German newspaper from the Ullstein publishing house. Operations began on 10 April 1927, and the paper enjoyed a quick rise in popularity in all social classes, reaching a circulation of over one million during its first year.

== Publishing history ==
The Green Post, "the Sunday newspaper for town and country", was originally conceived for the rural population. Its founder and initial editor-in-chief was a future travel writer and journalist Richard Katz. Its editor was Ehm Welk, who would be later known for his work Die Heiden von Kummerow.

The weekly paper appealed to all members of a family with a mix of articles on politics, economics, nature, serialized novels, puzzles, photographs, illustrated stories, and a children's supplement,[2] quickly became very popular across all social classes and reached circulations of over one million copies.

Since the liberal-leaning and economically successful Ullstein publishing house had always been a disruptive factor from the perspective of anti-Semites such as Theodor Fritsch and the Nazi Party, the pressure on the publishing house increased after Hitler's rise to power. The lead article in the Green Post of April 29, 1934, titled "Mr. Reich Minister, a word, please!", criticized Nazi press censorship under Propaganda Minister Joseph Goebbels. Goebbels responded by imposing a temporary ban on its publication, which ultimately led to the Ullstein family selling the company later that same year to prevent impending bankruptcy through further boycott measures. Welk was also dismissed and imprisoned for a time in the Oranienburg concentration camp until public protest saw him released on the condition that he be banned from his profession.

The newspaper finally ceased publication in 1944.

== Other activities ==
In 1932, the newspaper published plans for the Grüne Post airplane (named like the paper but without the article), leading to more than a hundred of these trainer gliders being constructed by hobbyists.
