= Richard Katz =

Richard Katz may refer to:

- Richard Katz (writer) (1888–1968), German journalist, travel writer, and essayist
- Richard Katz (politician), politician in the California State Assembly
- Richard H. Katz (born 1942), American bridge player
- Dick Katz (Richard Aaron Katz), American jazz pianist, arranger and record producer
