= Grüne Post =

German single-seat glider, 1932

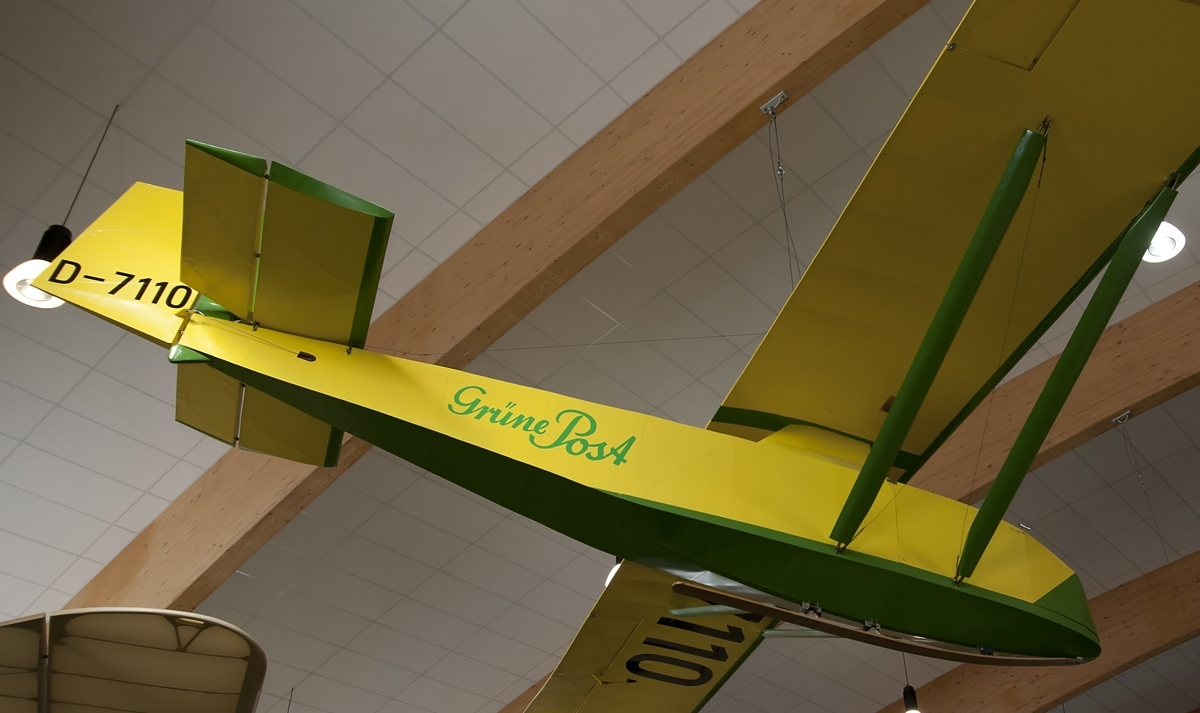
- Replica in German Gliding Museum

General information
- Type: Secondary trainer glider
- National origin: Germany
- Manufacturer: Amateur groups
- Designer: Alexander Lippisch

History
- First flight: 1932-3

The Grüne Post was a secondary trainer glider designed by Alexander Lippisch at the request of a German newspaper, the Grüne Post (English: Green Post), who distributed plans. Many were built by amateur groups.

== Design and development ==
In 1932 the Grüne Post, a popular German Sunday newspaper, approached Alexander Lippisch, a successful glider designer, for plans of a club glider that they would make available to their one million readers. The resulting simple single seat aircraft, named after the paper, was broadly similar to his earlier Prüfling design of six years earlier. The performance of the two types was also similar.

The Grüne Post had a constant chord, unswept wooden wing built around two spars and fabric covered except at the leading edge, which was plywood skinned. Its tips were slightly angled outwards behind the leading edge, where the tips of the broad ailerons were cropped. It was supported over the fuselage on a short chord, thin, enclosed pylon, its leading edge vertical under the forward wing and sloping down to the upper fuselage under the trailing edge of the wing. The forward half of the fuselage was built on a 610 mm (24.0 in) wide V-section platform, Zögling-style but with sloping side covering, onto which the controls and the single seat, with its back on the wing pylon, were mounted. The short nose section containing the cockpit opening could be removed for access or display. From each side of the platform a pair of streamlined, parallel lift struts braced the wing at about mid-span. Behind it the fuselage had a simple rectangular section structure.

The Grüne Post had a near rectangular horizontal tail of constant chord and slightly angled tips. A straight tapered, narrow fin was placed far enough aft that the rudder hinge line was almost beyond the elevator trailing edge; the rudder was also straight tapered, square tipped and reached down to the keel. The Grüne Post landed on a rubber sprung skid on the bottom of the fuselage platform, assisted by a small tail skid.

The first flight was in 1932 or 1933. Many Grüne Posts were amateur built from the plans available from the newspaper. The plans spread widely: two Grüne Posts were built in Hungary and one in Latvia. There is a replica in the German Gliding Museum on the Wasserkuppe but no originals in European museums.

== Specifications ==
Data from Sailplanes 1920-1945

General characteristics

- Capacity: One
- Length: 5.84 m (19 ft 2 in)
- Wingspan: 10.00 m (32 ft 10 in)
- Wing area: 13.5 m^{2} (145 sq ft)
- Aspect ratio: 7.4
- Empty weight: 110 kg (243 lb)
- Gross weight: 200 kg (441 lb)

Performance

- Wing loading: 14.8 kg/m^{2} (3.0 lb/sq ft)
