= Ringwood Mines landfill site =

Former iron mining site in the borough of Ringwood, New Jersey

Ringwood Mines
- Superfund site
- Location within Passaic County, New Jersey Location within New Jersey
- Location: Bourough of Ringwood, Passaic, New Jersey; 41.1427°N 74.2692°W

Information
- CERCLIS ID: NJD980529739
- Contaminants: Dioxane, aluminum, antimony, arsenic, barium, benzene,
- Responsible parties: Ford Motor Company

Progress
- Proposed: December 30, 1982
- Listed: September 8, 1983 (1st listing); September 27, 2006 (2nd listing)
- Construction completed: September 15, 1993 (1st listing)
- Deleted: November 2, 1994 (1st listing)

The Ringwood Mines landfill site is a 500 acres (200 ha) former iron mining site located in the borough of Ringwood, New Jersey. From 1967 to 1980, the Ford Motor Company dumped hazardous waste on this land, which negatively affected the health and properties of Ramapough Mountain Indians. This led to Mann V. Ford, a 1997 lawsuit between Ramapough Lenape Tribe's lawsuit of the Ford Motor Company.

Used in the late 1960s and early 1970s by the large Ford Motor Company plant in nearby Mahwah, New Jersey for disposal of waste, it was identified by the Environmental Protection Agency (EPA) for its Superfund priority list in 1984 for cleanup of hazardous wastes. EPA deleted the site from the Superfund list in 1994 but subsequently relisted the site several times due to failed environmental remediation. Portions of the landfill site were repurposed as land used for affordable housing for the Ramapough people in the 1970s, even though the land was contaminated. The plant closed in 1980.

EPA found additional pockets of paint sludge in 1995, 1998 and in 2004; it directed Ford to do additional cleanup.

In 2005, the Bergen Record did a five-part investigative series, Toxic Legacy, on the site and found extensive contamination in the nearby residential community. EPA confirmed the area was contaminated with industrial and hazardous waste and placed the site back on the Superfund priority list in 2006. It is part of the watershed for 2.5 million people in New Jersey.

Part of the 500 acres (200 ha) site extends into Ringwood State Park, as Ford had donated five acres of the former Peters Mine Pit site to the state, which absorbed it into the park.

By 2011, an additional 47,000 tonnes (104,000,000 lb) of contaminated earth has been removed from the site, five times as much as had been removed under the earlier cleanup in the 1980s and 1990s.

== History ==
Historically the Ringwood Mines area had been used for iron extraction, and the isolated mountain area includes abandoned mineshafts and pits, landfills and open waste dumps. During the late 1960s and early 1970s, the site was used by the Ford Motor Company for the disposal of paint sludge and other waste generated at its Mahwah Assembly plant, at that time the largest auto assembly plant in the United States. By the time of the plant's closure in 1980, "millions of gallons" of paint sludge, estimated as enough to fill two of the three tubes of the Lincoln Tunnel, had been dumped in the area. Ford's own records show that during the period 1967-1971 alone, 11,350 tonnes (25,020,000 lb) of paint sludge from Mahwah was dumped at Ringwood. As environmental laws had not yet been passed, Ford claims that the dumping was legal. Between 1955 - when the plant opened - and 1970, the disposal of industrial waste was "essentially unregulated" as a state law against contamination of streams was unenforced.

In the 1970s, Ford donated the five acres of the Peters Mine Pit area to the state, which made it part of what is now Ringwood State Park. After 1976 and passage of the National Environmental Policy Act (NEPA), when the corporate disposal of hazardous wastes became more tightly regulated by federal law, the American Mafia conducted illegal dumping at Ringwood. Vincent "the Chin" Gigante of the Genovese crime family reportedly threatened to execute a rival to secure the "rights" to dispose of Ford's paint sludge in the area. The involvement of organized crime dated back to at least 1965, as Joseph "Joey Surprise" Feola was executed by Louis "Fat Lou" LaRasso - on the orders of the Gambino crime family - for "stealing" the Ford waste contract. Contractors dumped waste anywhere they could.

In 1975, American poet and journalist Jan Barry among the reporters at The Record who investigated the Ford Motor Company's pollution. This began the "battle of the Ramapough Indians in a bid to secure a healthier future for their children in the face of alleged atrocities committed by the Ford Corporation and the EPA".

In 2005 the Bergen Record completed an eight-month investigation, published as a five-part series, Toxic Legacy, on the Ringwood site. It found extensive contamination in the community. EPA confirmed the area was still contaminated with industrial and hazardous waste, after four cleanups, and placed the site back on the Superfund priority list. Part of the site extends into Ringwood State Park. From 2006 to 2011, the EPA has directed the removal of an additional 47,000 tonnes (104,000,000 lb) of contaminated earth and sludge from the site, more than five times what was cleaned up in the first efforts.

In 2011, Ford proposed taking back the Peters Mine Pit site, but this has been opposed by environmentalists, concerned that the pit may be packed with contaminants. More than 65,000 citizens signed an online petition in opposition to the proposal, and the state Department of Environment and Parks said it never considered returning the site to Ford. The work continues on cleanup.

Environmentalists are concerned about contaminants getting into groundwater supplies and threatening a watershed that serves 2.5 million residents, a quarter of the state's population. Numerous people have been more directly affected, as Ringwood has historically been a center of population for the Ramapough Mountain Indians, whose children used to play with the bright paints and debris of the landfill. Their ancestors used to work in the iron mines.

During the years of dumping, some of the men would scavenge the debris, seeking copper and other valuable metals for sale. Industrial waste was pushed into pits and mineshafts; paint sludge hardens and appears as slabs near streams. Levels of lead and antimony have been found in paint sludge near residences to be one hundred times safety levels. Numerous families have been affected by high rates of cancer and adverse health effects from contamination near their residences and in the groundwater. In 2006, some 600 Ramapough filed a mass tort suit, Mann v. Ford, against Ford Motor Company for the dumping. During the 2008–2010 automotive industry crisis, at a time when it appeared that Ford might be in danger of going bankrupt, the Ramapough feared that the company might be gone and Ford acted on those fears, and in September 2009 the tribe accepted a settlement of $11 million from Ford and its contractors, plus $1.5 million from the town of Ringwood, for an average payout of $8,000 per Ramapough resident after attorney fees.

== Representation in other media ==
- The Ramapough suit against Ford has been covered in Mann v. Ford, a documentary produced by HBO. Directed by Maro Chermayeff and Micah Fink, it features Wayne Mann of the Ramapough and Vicki Gilliam of The Cochran Firm, which represented the tribe. It also features reporter Jan Barry, who helped break the story at The Record. It covers five years in which the tribe pursued the case, as well as arguing before Congress for relief and financial compensation. The plaintiffs have settled with the company.
- Toxic Legacy by The Record newspaper, a 5-part documentary available online at toxiclegacy.northjersey.com
- The SundanceTV series The Red Road is a fictionalized account of a police officer and incorporates many elements of the situation into the story, such as the paint sludge and the Ramapo Lenape Nation.
