= Ehm Welk =

German writer and journalist

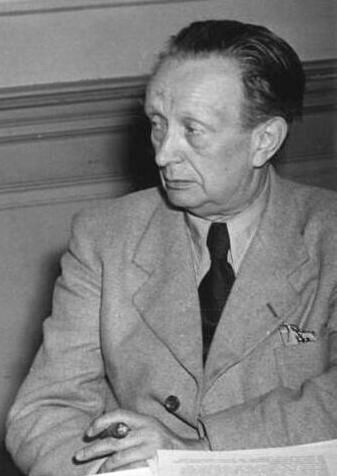
Welk in 1952

Emil "Ehm" Welk (August 29, 1884 – December 19, 1966) was a German journalist, writer, professor and founder of Volkshochschulen (adult education centres). He became known for his work Die Heiden von Kummerow (The Heathens of Kummerow) and used Thomas Trimm as a pseudonym.

== Life ==
Welk was born as the son of a farmer in Biesenbrow (now part of Angermünde), Brandenburg. After frequenting the village school, the 16-year-old moved away from home, completed a commercial education, worked on the sea and as a journalist for several papers, e.g. in Brunswick for the Braunschweiger Allgemeiner Anzeiger, whose editor-in-chief he was from 1910 on to 1919. Afterwards, he worked for the Braunschweiger Morgenzeitung.

During these times, Welk experienced the German Revolution in Brunswick. His experiences later built the background for the novel Im Morgennebel, that describes true Brunswick events and people of these times in a not much encrypted way. This novel's manuscript, that employed Welk for a long time, was already finished in 1940 but not published until 1953 in East Germany

In 1922 Welk traveled to the United States and Latin America. One year later, he went back to Weimar Germany and worked as a writer and journalist, mainly in Berlin and neighbourhood. Two revolutionary dramas, Gewitter über Gotland (1926) and Kreuzabnahme (1927), caused scandals and had to be taken out of the theatres' repertoires – despite their popular success.

In 1934, one year after Hitler's Machtergreifung, Welk, under the pseudonym Thomas Trimm, wrote an open letter in the Grüne Post titled Auf ein Wort, Herr Minister, in which he criticised Nazi press censorship under Propaganda Minister Joseph Goebbels. The writer was then arrested and imprisoned in KZ Oranienburg for a short while. After his discharge (that was mainly due to protests by foreign journalists), he was banned from his profession.

In 1935, Welk settled in the Spreewald with his wife Agathe Lindner, who was also a writer; she is known for her novel Juliane Wied and was together with Welk from 1924 until his death. Despite the ban, Welk began writing again, but only wrote – seemingly – "unpolitical books". In this era, his successful novels Die Heiden von Kummerow (1937), Die Lebensuhr des Gottlieb Grambauer (1938), and Die Gerechten von Kummerow (1943) were born. These novels described life in northern Germany's villages in a humorous way. It is supposed today that the character Martin Grambauer wears autobiographical traces of his author, while Gottlieb Grambauer is a tribute to the author's father.

After 1945, Welk ceased his literary work for a few years. He stayed in East Germany and founded six Volkshochschulen (adult education centres) in Mecklenburg. In 1946, he became director of a Volkshochschule in Schwerin.

In 1950, Welk moved to Bad Doberan and began with writing again. He received several awards of the GDR (e.g. the Nationalpreis in 1954), and became an honorary citizen of the towns Bad Doberan and Angermünde. At the University of Greifswald, he became an honorary doctor in 1956 and professor of the philosophy faculty in 1964.

Welk died in 1966 in Bad Doberan.

== Censorship ==
Before World War II, Welk was often compared with the "hunger priest" Wilhelm Raabe and with Gustav Freytag. In the GDR Die Heiden von Kummerow and Die Gerechten von Kummerow were his most popular works; they were seen as a German pendant to Guareschi's narrations about Don Camillo and Peppone. The film Die Heiden von Kummerow und ihre lustigen Streiche was, in 1967, one of the rare co-productions of the GDR and West Germany. DEFA made another movie of the book in 1982. The rest of Welk's works were republished by the GDR after his death, but some of them were modified deeply. It is not clear whether Welk wanted to remove Nazi-adopted text or censored himself because of being influenced by upcoming new dictatorship or GDR editors made modifications. Compared to the first edition of Die Heiden von Kummerow, for instance, later releases were anti-military in nature. Several words ("König" instead of "General", "hottentotisch" instead of "polnisch") were changed, as were contents and motives. Christian and biblical elements were replaced by belief in revolution and class conflict. For instance, Krischan's humbleness when he is banished from the village is not Christian anymore, but self-accusing: he accuses himself of not having supported the revolt of the seamen.

== Selected works ==
- Gewitter über Gotland (drama, 1927)
- Kreuzabnahme (drama, 1927)
- Michael Knobbe oder Das Loch im Gesicht (comedy, 1931)
- Die schwarze Sonne (biography of Emin Pascha, 1933)
- Die Heiden von Kummerow (novel about a youth spent in a village, 1937)
- Die Lebensuhr des Gottlieb Grambauer (historic novel: „Ein Jahrhundert preußisch-deutscher Geschichte von einem fernen Dorfwinkel aus beobachtet" (according to the foreword), 1938)
- Der hohe Befehl (historic novel about World War I and German POWs in Russia, 1939)
- Die wundersame Freundschaft (about people and animals, 1940)
- Die Gerechten von Kummerow (novel – sequel to Die Heiden von Kummerow, 1943)
- Die stillen Gefährten (about living with animals, 1943)
- Der Nachtmann – Geschichte einer Fahrt zwischen hüben und drüben (1949)
- Mein Land, das ferne leuchtet (novel, 1952)
- Im Morgennebel (novel about November Revolution in Brunswick, 1953)
- Kein Hüsung (movie script, 1954)
- Mutafo (grotesque seamen’s stories, 1955)
- Der Hammer will gehandhabt sein (narrations, 1958)
- Der wackere Kühnemann aus Puttelfingen (satirical novel, 1959)

== Literature and films about him ==
- Ingeborg Gerlach: Ehm Welk: „Im Morgennebel“. Entstehung und Rezeption des Romans. In: Braunschweigisches Jahrbuch, volume 75, Brunswick 1994
- Konrad Reich: Ehm Welk – Stationen eines Lebens. Rostock: Hinstorff, 1976
- Matthias Friske: Kummerow im Bruch hinterm Berge.
- Christian Lehmann: "Im Bruch hinterm Berge – Ehm Welk und Biesenbrow", Dokumentary film, DEFA, 1978
