= The Red Road (TV series) =

American TV series

- Promotional Poster
- Genre: Drama
- Created by: Aaron Guzikowski
- Starring: Martin Henderson; Jason Momoa; Julianne Nicholson; Tamara Tunie; Kiowa Gordon; Allie Gonino; Annalise Basso; Tom Sizemore
- Composer: Daniel Licht
- Country of origin: United States
- Original language: English
- No. of seasons: 2
- No. of episodes: 12

Production
- Executive producers: Aaron Guzikowski; Bridget Carpenter; Sarah Condon
- Producer: James Bigwood
- Production locations: Cartersville, Georgia
- Cinematography: Ivan Strasburg
- Editor: Kristina Boden
- Running time: 42–45 minutes
- Production companies: Fair Harbor Productions; Shady Cat Productions

Original release
- Network: SundanceTV
- Release: February 27, 2014 – May 7, 2015

The Red Road is an American drama television series that aired on SundanceTV from February 27, 2014, to May 7, 2015. This was SundanceTV's second fully owned scripted original series; the first was Rectify. The Red Road was canceled after its second season, as confirmed by Jason Momoa, who played Phillip Kopus in the series. The show's plot is based on the plight of the Ramapough Lenape Nation at the Ringwood Mines landfill site in New Jersey, where toxic wastes from the nearby Mahwah Ford plant were dumped.

== Plot ==
Police Officer Harold Jensen is the main protagonist. He is trying to keep his family together after a cover-up involving his mentally unstable wife, a recovering alcoholic who self-medicates her undiagnosed schizophrenia with alcohol. Jensen comes into conflict with Phillip Kopus, a member of the Ramapough Mountain people. His state-recognized tribe lives in the Ramapo Mountains in a border area of New York and New Jersey in the fictitious small town of Walpole, New Jersey, northwest of New York City.

== Production ==
The working title for the series was originally The Descendants. Production for both seasons was in Atlanta, Georgia, in 2013 and 2014.

== Cast ==
=== Main cast ===
- Martin Henderson as Harold Jensen
- Jason Momoa as Phillip Kopus
- Julianne Nicholson as Jean Jensen
- Allie Gonino as Rachel Jensen
- Tamara Tunie as Marie Van Der Veen
- Kiowa Gordon as Junior Van Der Veen
- Annalise Basso as Kate Jensen

=== Recurring cast ===
- Gary Farmer as Mac
- Tom Sizemore as Jack Kopus
- Lisa Bonet as Sky Van Der Veen
- Zahn McClarnon as Mike Parker
- Antoni Corone as Captain Warren
- Brooke Montalvo as Paige
- Keith Flippen as Dr. Beilke
- Mike Farrell as David Rogers
- Irene Ziegler as Sylvia Rogers
- Nick Gomez as Frank Morgan
- Doris Morgado as Iana Morgan
- Logan Siu as Paul Morgan
- Wes Studi as Chief Levi Gall
- Arturo Fonts as Robby
- Sabina Akhmedova as Fayina
- Dwayne Boyd as Bernard Roald
- Boo Arnold as Attorney Irv Nesbitt
- Anthony Reynolds as Brennan
- Ryan Nesset as Officer K. Felix
- Tammy Arnold as Officer Spector
- Jeff Matthew Glover as Officer Baker
- Nickola Shreli as Duke
- Ben Winchell as Brad
- Ian Gregg as Leo
- Victor Gage as Lenape Hunter
- Manuel Rodriguez as Ramapo Native American

== Episodes ==
=== Series overview ===
Season	Episodes	Originally released	
Season	Episodes	First released	Last released
1	6	February 27, 2014	April 3, 2014
2	6	April 2, 2015	May 7, 2015

=== Season 1 (2014) ===
No. overall	No. in season	Title	Directed by	Written by	Original release date	U.S. viewers (millions)
1	1	"Arise My Love, Shake Off This Dream"	James Gray	Aaron Guzikowski	February 27, 2014	0.342
White police officer Harold Jensen investigates an NYU student who has gone missing in the woods in the Ramapo Mountains, near the Lenape Native American settlement. Since the white and Native communities historically have not gotten along, the locals keep quiet about the disappearance, so the case stalls. Meanwhile, a dangerous member of the tribe, Phillip Kopus, returns from prison to set up an illegal prescription drug operation. He recruits his friend Mike, an outcast tribe member and visits his estranged mother Marie, who has recently been diagnosed with cancer. Harold tries to keep the peace in his home with his beloved but mentally unstable wife Jean. Though they dated as teenagers, Jean now despises Kopus because she believes he deliberately failed to prevent her brother Brian’s drowning when they were in high school. She is a recovering alcoholic who struggles with their teenage daughter, Rachel, who is dating a Lenape boy named Junior, who is Kopus' half brother. The young couple visit with Kopus, and ask if they can stay in his cabin over night. When Rachel doesn't come home that night, Jean has a nervous breakdown and drives up to the mountains to search for her daughter, but she soon becomes involved in a hit and run accident that nearly kills a Lenape youth and impacts the whole town.
2	2	"The Wolf and the Dog"	J. Michael Muro	Aaron Guzikowski	March 6, 2014	0.288
Believing Jean actually ran over the Lenape boy, Harold covers up the truth when he fixes the damage to his wife’s vehicle, but Jean wants to make a statement. Seeing Harold’s despair over the accident, Kopus seizes the opportunity to blackmail the officer to look the other way as his illicit drug business starts up. Meanwhile, Jean and her lawyer pay a visit to the police station to go over her version of the story but she is clearly delusional and mixes up the current case to her brother’s death long ago. After spending some time at her parents' house to rest, Jean starts hearing the voice of Rachel as a little girl, beckoning her for help. When she tries to jump out a window, Harold checks his wife into a psychiatric hospital. Harold also faces the father of the hospitalized Lenape boy at his home, while Kopus has a run-in with a man from his past.
3	3	"The Woman Who Fell from the Sky"	J. Michael Muro	Bridget Carpenter	March 13, 2014	0.169*
Kopus and Mike let Junior in on their drug operation when all three break into a nursing home for more supplies. The Lenape chief and a former tribe member-turned-NYC-lawyer Sky Van Der Veen lead protestors who gather outside the police station to seek justice for the hit and run victim. Meanwhile, Jean's emotional turmoil worsens when she confesses to her doctor about hearing voices in her head since her pregnancy with Rachel, prompting Harold to move their daughters to his in-laws' home. While there, Rachel discovers a suitcase full of cassette tapes in a closet that has voice recordings by her late uncle Brian. While the search for the missing NYU college student continues, the case turns when Harold presses one of Kopus' drug buddies for information.
4	4	"The Bad Weapons"	Lodge Kerrigan	Zack Whedon	March 20, 2014	0.202
The Lenape chief calls in a favor to tip off the DEA, who raid a squatter's house in the mountains for drugs, causing Harold to get caught between his law enforcement duties and his truce with Kopus. Meanwhile, Jean is diagnosed as schizophrenic, which leads to a major change in her outlook on life. Though Harold refuses to believe the diagnosis, Jean is somewhat relieved to finally know what she is up against, and hopes that she may improve with proper medication. Feeling he is keeping the wrong company, Rachel breaks up with Junior, who falls deeper into the drug trade, while she continues to listen to her uncle's tapes. Junior tries to help Marie by giving her stolen pills for her cancer, but the medication quickly runs out. A pair of NYPD detectives pay a visit to Harold's home to personally ask him some pressing questions about the college student case. After another supply run, Mike reveals to Kopus that his father Jack was the one who sent him to jail by setting him up, leading Kopus to kill Mike for concealing the betrayal and informing on him to Harold.
5	5	"The Great Snake Battle"	Lodge Kerrigan	Aaron Guzikowski	March 27, 2014	0.152
After learning new information about his father, Kopus heads to Brooklyn armed with a gun to confront him. Harold uses a crude map Kopus gave him to find where the college student's body is located. Captain Warren questions Harold as to how he knew to check 3 miles outside of the search radius, but Harold deflects this by reminding Warren that it was by the same lake where Jean's brother was killed. To cover up Mike's murder, Kopus tells Junior he got freaked out by the DEA's raid and left town. A settlement is reached with the parents of the little boy hit by Jean, much against the Lenape Chief's wishes. When Jack Kopus' fingerprints are found on the murder weapon, the NYPD detectives get a warrant to arrest him and the results are disastrous. The truce is off when Harold tells Kopus he received an anonymous tip where his drugs are stored. Jean makes a bold choice after her father tells her she is responsible for the hit and run.
6	6	"Snaring of the Sun"	Terry McDonough	Aaron Guzikowski	April 3, 2014	0.107
Harold discovers the gut-wrenching truth about Jean's brother's death when he listens to Brian's tape that he made right before he died. Wanting to make everything right with his wife, he then lets Jean listen to the recording. Later, Jean pays Kopus a surprise visit at his motel and their powerful mutual attraction is reignited. Walking together into the woods, Jean declares her love for her husband, but she can't resist a passionate embrace with her former lover. Kopus tells her he wasn't responsible for Brian's death and Jean tells him that she finally knows this is true. Still angry that she had him run out of town, Kopus refuses to believe that Jean has only learned of his innocence that day. He storms off and leaves her alone in the woods, causing her to have a mental breakdown by a lake. In a daze, Jean walks into the lake and is nearly drowned, but Harold has been searching for her and pulls her out of the water in time. Junior learns Rachel is back to her old life and hanging out with the popular kids in school. After his drugs got raided in the cave, Kopus finds himself in imminent, life-threatening danger both from his father, who comes to Marie’s house armed with a shotgun, and Albanian gangsters, his drug backers who track him down while in the back of Harold's police vehicle.

=== Season 2 (2015) ===
No. overall	No. in season	Title	Directed by	Written by	Original release date	U.S. viewers (millions)
7	1	"Gifts"	Randall Einhorn	Aaron Guzikowski	April 2, 2015	0.191
After the shoot-out with the Albanians, Kopus and Harold must answer for their actions to the authorities. One goes back in prison and the other is promoted to lieutenant. A year later, Kopus is released from jail and returns home on parole with an ankle monitor and there are new conflicts about a Native American casino being built on sacred land. Meanwhile, Harold must deal with Walpole locals who are angry about the Lenape tribe receiving federal recognition, and later he has to investigate a murder that was committed up on the mountain. Also, Jean is still struggling to put her life back together and tries to silence the voices in her head with the aid of clozapine.
8	2	"Graves"	Randall Einhorn	Patricia Breen	April 9, 2015	0.160
Even though the Lenape now have their own tribe police force, a tribal posse is assembled and comes after Kopus, who is suspected killed of Chief Mac. The tribal posse beats Kopus and covers him in tar. Meanwhile, Harold tries to protect Junior during a fellow officer's harsh interrogation – however, this puts his good-standing for the new captain position at the police department in jeopardy. Also, Jean meets a medicine woman at the funeral who tells her of an alternative treatment for her schizophrenia. Later, she is called over to take care of Captain Warren after his wife succumbs to cancer and learns his real plan to join her in death.
9	3	"Intruders"	Jeremy Webb	Aaron Guzikowski	April 16, 2015	0.204
Life resumes after Captain Warren's suicide when he killed his sick wife. Jean's parents want her and Harold to move out of Walpole, but they want to stay in town considering all the recent turmoil. Meanwhile, Marie, now the interim chief, meets with the Tribal Council to discuss the casino issue, which Sky is strongly against. Later, two masked men break into Marie's home demanding the money Kopus took from Mac's body. This forces Harold and Frank Morgan of the tribal police to partner up to hunt down the intruders who are fleeing the mountain. Also, the mysterious blue sludge that causes cancer to the Lenape is back.
10	4	"A Cure"	Jeremy Webb	Patricia Breen	April 23, 2015	0.165
After the events of the masked men shooting, Harold thinks his career is over, but when meeting with the mayor, he learns the gun found on the man he shot is an exact match used to kill Mac, and is made captain. When he reads a cryptic note from Capt. Warren, he decides to investigate the cancerous blue sludge situation. He learns from Jack Kopus, who is in prison that the blue sludge is paint from an auto plant, who paid the cops to look the other way so they could pump 60,000 tons into the iron mine shafts on the entire mountain. Meanwhile, Marie agrees to Chief Levi building a casino on Lenape land and argues with Junior over it. Kopus tries to prove his innocence to Junior, but Mike's girlfriend finds him guilty of murdering Mike. Also, Rachel starts hearing voices and takes Jean's medicine, which has negative effects.
11	5	"The Hatching"	Randall Einhorn	Aaron Guzikowski	April 30, 2015	0.165
Still upset over Rachel's traumatic episode, Jean disposes of her anti-psychotic pills. Meanwhile, Harold makes an unexpected discovery when he uncovers toxic paint leaking from a cemented-over mine shaft entrance. Jean sees a vision of a bird's nest with dead hatchlings covered in sludge and remembers a man delivering it in a box to her father as a child. She then informs Harold that David may be involved. Since he can't leave the state while on parole, Kopus tells Harold that Junior went with Levi to his house in Connecticut to kill him after finding out his father is responsible for Mac's death. But, he breaks it in order to rescue Junior, who after failing his task, fled to the woods.
12	6	"Shadow Walker"	Randall Einhorn	Aaron Guzikowski	May 7, 2015	0.183
After searching the woods, Harold and Kopus locate Junior on the run from his father's murderous tribe. Kopus is able to distract them, allowing everyone to escape, but this puts a target on their backs. Meanwhile, in Walpole, Jean confronts her father about his archaic treatment of her brother's condition and holds a plastic bag over his head for a few seconds like he did with Brian. David has a heart attack and Rachel has to clean up her mother's mess as Jean is not in the right mind. Also, Harold learns in his absence, the town and the tribe are blaming each other for the toxic sludge. Later, even though Kopus is able to evade Levi's ambush by killing him and several of his men, he fails to protect Marie and Junior in another attack, leaving them seriously wounded in their home.

== Reception ==
The Red Road has received mostly favorable reviews. Review aggregator site Metacritic has given the season a "generally favorable" score of 66 out of 100, based on 25 critics. On another review aggregator site, Rotten Tomatoes, it holds a 65% rating with an average rating of 6.9 out of 10, based on 26 reviews. The consensus reads, "The Red Road suffers from uneven writing, but its talented cast and creepy story hint at undeveloped promise."

== Graphic novel ==
In 2015, Sundance released The Red Road 1990: A Graphic Novel to be read online.

== See also ==
- The red road (definition)
- Out of the Furnace
