= Office of Federal Acknowledgment =

Agency overview
- Type: United States federal agency
- Jurisdiction: Federal government of the United States
- Headquarters: Main Interior Building 1849 C Street, NW Washington, DC 20240
- Agency executive: Nikki Bass, Director of the Office of Federal Acknowledgment
- Parent agency: Bureau of Indian Affairs
- Website: www.bia.gov/as-ia/ofa

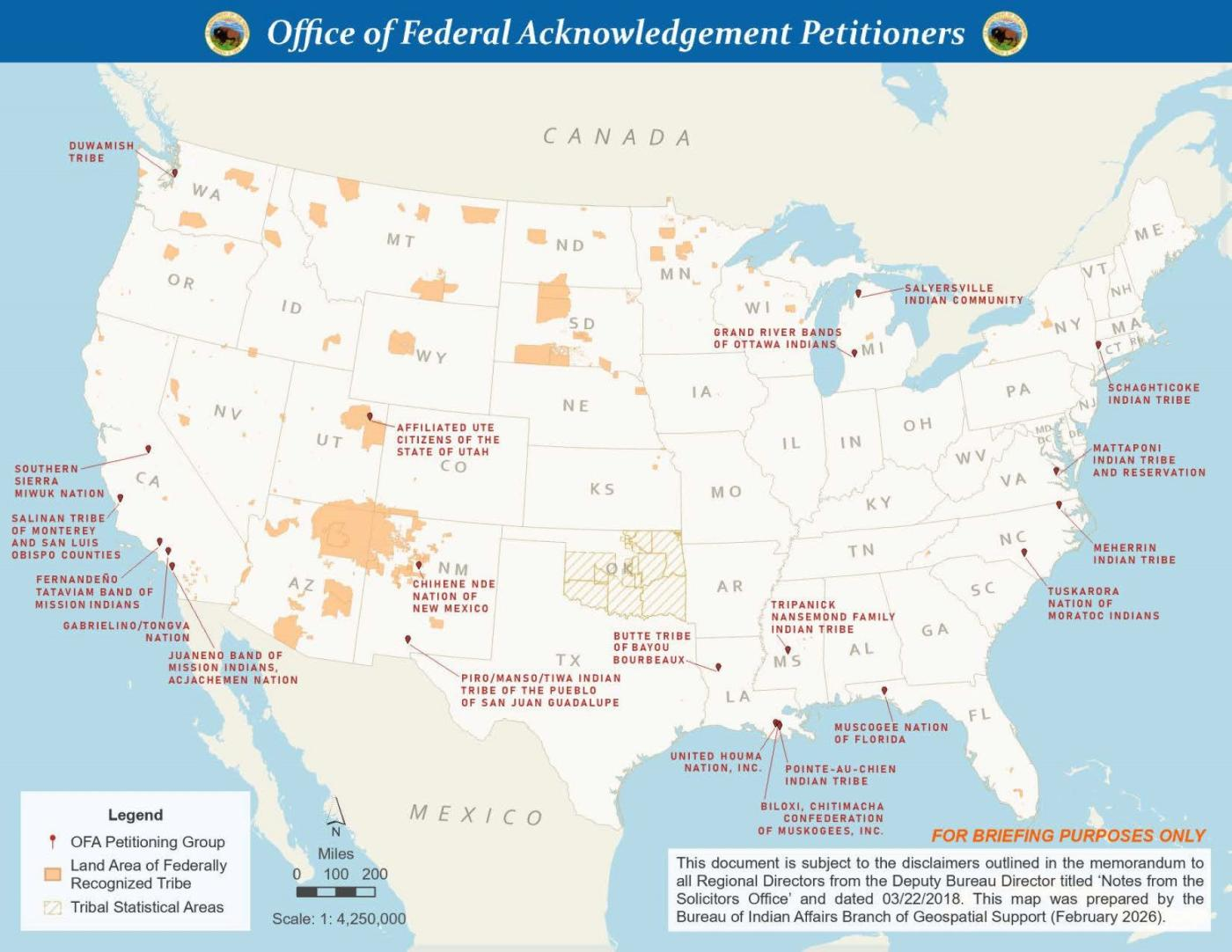
Petitioners for Federal Recognition to the Office of Federal Acknowledgment.

The Office of Federal Acknowledgment (OFA) is an office within the Office of the Assistant Secretary for Indian Affairs of the Bureau of Indian Affairs, responsible for the acknowledgment process for groups that are petitioning to be federally recognized by the US government as American Indian tribes.

== About ==
The Office of Federal Acknowledgment was established in 1978.

The two primary ways for groups who self-identify as Native American tribes or who are state-recognized tribes to become acknowledged as federally recognized tribes is either through submitting an OFA petition or through the passage of congressional legislation. The majority of the 575 federally recognized tribes did not require approval by OFA or Congress. Around two dozen tribes have been recognized through Congress, while 18 have been recognized through an OFA petition. As of 2025, 19 OFA petitions were pending.

== Completed petitions ==
Some tribes acknowledged by OFA include the Cowlitz Indian Tribe, the Death Valley Timbi-Sha Shoshone Band of California, the Grand Traverse Band of Ottawa and Chippewa Indians, the Jamestown S'Klallam Tribe of Washington, the Jena Band of Choctaw Indians, the Mashpee Wampanoag Tribe, the Match-e-be-nash-she-wish Band of Pottawatomi Indians of Michigan, the Mohegan Tribe, the Narragansett Indian Tribe, the Pamunkey Indian Tribe, the Poarch Band of Creeks, the Samish Tribe of Indians, the San Juan Southern Paiute Tribe, the Shinnecock Indian Nation, the Snoqualmie Indian Tribe, the Tunica-Biloxi Indian Tribe, and the Wampanoag Tribe of Gay Head.

Some self-identifying or state-recognized tribes denied by OFA include the Brothertown Indians of Wisconsin, the Georgia Tribe of Eastern Cherokee, the Juaneño Band of Mission Indians, the Muwekma Ohlone Tribe, the Nipmuc Nation, the Ramapough Mountain Indians, Inc., the Steilacoom Tribe of Indians, the St. Francis/Sokoki Band of Abenakis of Vermont, and the Webster/Dudley Band of Chaubunagungamaug Nipmuck Indians.

== See also ==
- Federally recognized tribe
  - List of federally recognized tribes by state
  - List of federally recognized tribes in the contiguous United States
