= The Heathens of Kummerow =

1967 film

- Directed by: Werner Jacobs
- Written by: Kurt Hahne; Eberhard Keindorff; Johanna Sibeliu
- Based on: The Heathens of Kummerow by Ehm Welk
- Produced by: Kurt Hahne; Walter Koppel
- Starring: Paul Dahlke; Ralf Wolter; Fritz Tillmann
- Cinematography: Günter Haubold
- Edited by: Monika Schindler
- Music by: Rolf Alexander Wilhelm
- Production companies: DEFA; Neue Deutsche Filmgesellschaft; Neue Real Film W. Koppel
- Distributed by: Constantin Film
- Release date: 21 December 1967
- Running time: 94 minutes
- Countries: East Germany; West Germany
- Language: German

The Heathens of Kummerow (German: Die Heiden von Kummerow und ihre lustigen Streiche, lit. 'The Heathens of Kummerow and Their Funny Pranks') is a 1967 East German-West German family comedy film directed by Werner Jacobs and starring Paul Dahlke, Ralf Wolter and Fritz Tillmann. It is an adaptation of the novel of the same name, written by Ehm Welk and published in 1937.

The film's sets were designed by the art directors Senta Ochs and Alfred Tolle. Location shooting took place around Rügen.

== Plot ==
It is the era before World War I and short before Easter in the village of Kummerow in Pomerania, and a group of boys revive a custom of "heathen baptism". It is said that the villagers had resisted Christianization by remaining in the water during the baptism, which lived on as a traditional contest where boys will stand in the cold water, and the one who endures the longest is crowned "heathen king". This practice is not appreciated by the local pastor, although when the pastor and the illegally employed cowherd Krischan get into trouble with the miller Düker, the boys' talent for playing pranks comes in handy.

== Cast ==
- Paul Dahlke as Pastor Breithaupt
- Ralf Wolter as Krischan
- Fritz Tillmann as Müller Düker
- Rainer Penkert as Grambauer
- Theo Lingen as Sanftleben
- Günther Jerschke as Niemeier
- Wolfgang Jansen as Josef
- Jochen Sehrndt as Christian Wendland
- Hans Klering as Nachtwächter Bärensprung
- Horst Kube as Bauer Trebbin
- Irene Korb as Hermine Breithaupt
- Tatjana Iwanow as Frau Düker
- Angela Brunner as Luise Bärensprung
- Erika Müller-Fürstenau as Frau Grambauer
- Karin Heidemann as Ulrike Breithaupt
- Wolfgang Hinz as Hermann
- Jörg Resler as Martin Grambauer
- Gerald Schraml as Johannes
- Hans Bosenius as Kantor Kannegiesser
- Günter Drescher as Bauer Fiebelkorn
- Nico Turoff as Wirt Krüger
- Albert Zahn as Otto Kienbaum

== Production ==
The film is based on the 1937 novel The Heathens of Kummerow by Ehm Welk. The book was the third best selling novel written in Nazi Germany, and along with other novels by the apolitical humourist Welk, it became a modern classic in East Germany. The film adaptation was the first film co-produced by East and West Germany.
