= Jeroen Dewulf =

Belgian academic

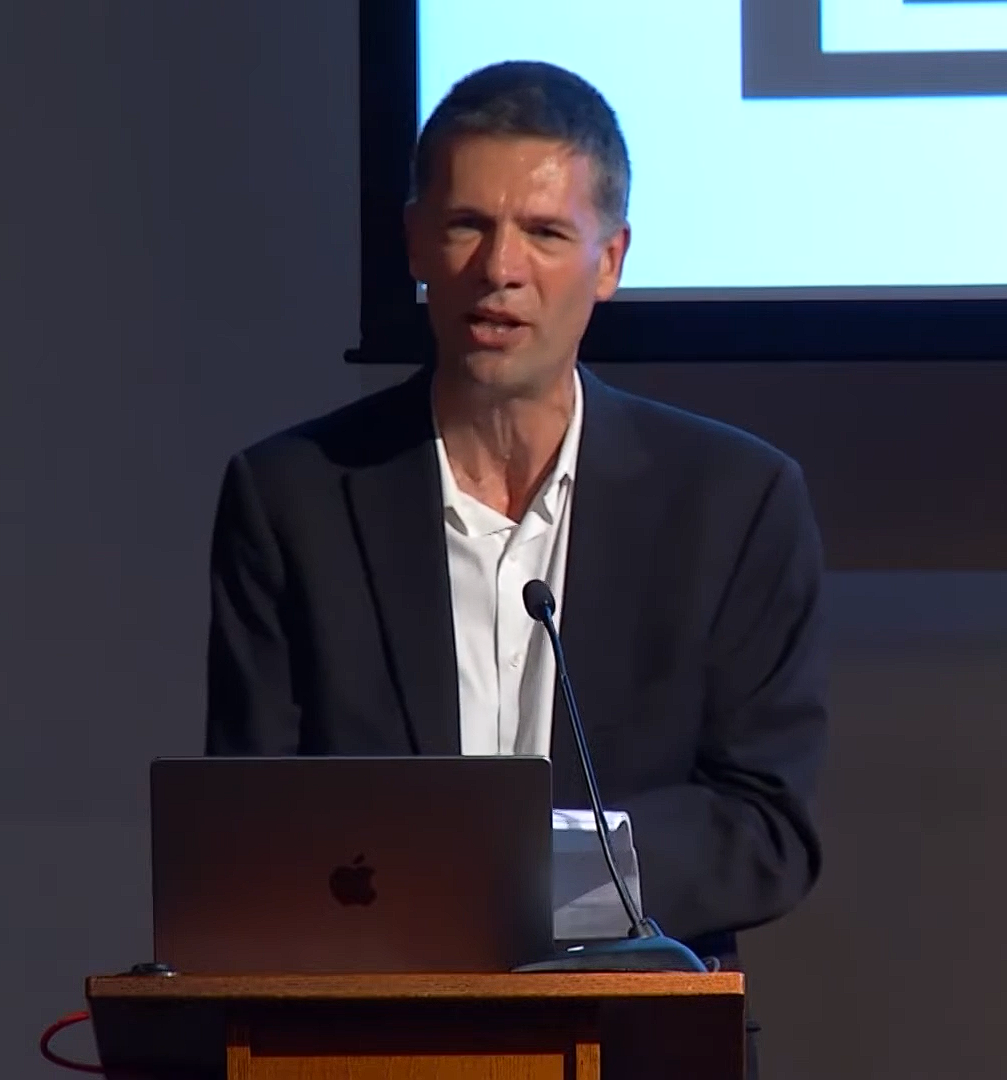
- At the 2023 talk "Transmitting Anne Frank to Gen Z"
- Born: 1972 (age 53–54); Nieuwpoort, Belgium
- Education: Ghent University; University of Porto; the University of Bern
- Occupation: Academic
- Employer: University of California, Berkeley

Jeroen Dewulf (born 1972) is a Belgian scholar specializing in Folklore Studies, Dutch culture, the Dutch language, German Studies, slavery and African-American culture, Caribbean Studies, and Latin American Studies. He is a professor at the University of California, Berkeley.

== Biography ==
Dewulf was born in 1972 in Nieuwpoort, Belgium. He was educated at Ghent University, University of Porto and the University of Bern. Since 2007, he has been teaching in the Folkore Program and the German department at the University of California, Berkeley. From 2014 until 2024, he was the director of Institute of European Studies at University of California, Berkeley.

== Works ==
Dewulf works mainly on slavery and African-American culture in Dutch Brazil, New Netherland and New York City, most notably the legacy of Pinkster and Sojourner Truth in his book The Pinkster King and the King of Kongo: The Forgotten History of America's Dutch-Owned Slaves (2017), and in Louisiana, most notably the origins of the Mardi Gras Indians in his book From the Kingdom of Kongo to Congo Square: Kongo Dances and the Origins of the Mardi Gras Indians (2017). His book Afro-Atlantic Catholics: America's First Black Christians (2022) presents a new perspective on the history of Black Christianity. His research on the Caribbean led to new theories on the origins of the Calinda and Junkanoo. In 2021, he also presented a new theory on the origins of a festive tradition in Brazil, known as cucumbi.

Dewulf also studies Dutch colonial and postcolonial literature from the Dutch East Indies and the Caribbean, including authors such as Tjalie Robinson, Albert Helman (Lou Lichtveld) and Tip Marugg. Together with Olf Praamstra and Michiel van Kempen, he edited the book Shifting the Compass (2013); with Luc Renders, he published an anthology of Flemish literature on the Congo (2020). He is also a specialist in the works of the Swiss author Hugo Loetscher and is the testamentary executor of his archival papers at the Swiss National Library. In Hugo Loetscher und die Portugiesischsprachige Welt (1999), he studied Loetscher's work about Portugal, Brazil and the relics of the former commercial empire of the Portuguese in Asia and Oceania. In 2005, he published In alle Richtungen gehen. Reden und Aufsätze über Hugo Loetscher in cooperation with Rosmarie Zeller and in 2016, he edited a book with travel reports from Loetscher about Brazil entitled Das Entdecken erfinden. In Brasilien mit Brüchen (2007), he also focused on other Swiss writers in Brazil, including Johann Jakob von Tschudi, Louis Agassiz, Blaise Cendrars, and Richard Katz.

In 2004, he published Gramática da língua neerlandesa, the first grammar book of the Dutch language written in Portuguese. In 2010, he wrote Spirit of Resistance, a book on clandestine literature by the Dutch resistance in the Second World War, using the Dutch clandestine book collection at the Bancroft Library. From 2014 until 2025, he was the director of Institute of European Studies at University of California, Berkeley. He currently serves as the faculty academic director for Berkeley's Study Abroad Program.

In 2014, he was distinguished with the Hendricks Award of the New Netherland Institute for his research on New Netherland and the first slave community on Manhattan. In 2015, he was awarded the Louisiana History President's Memorial Award and both in 2015 and 1016, he received the Clague and Carol Van Slyke Prize. His book on the Mardi Gras Indians won the 2018 Independent Publisher Book Awards Southeast Non-Fiction Gold Medal. His 2022 book on the history of Black Christianity was awarded the 2023 John Gilmary Shea Prize by the American Catholic Historical Association.

== Books ==
- Hugo Loetscher und die 'Portugiesischsprachige Welt' (Bern: Peter Lang Verlag, 1999).
- Gramática da Língua Neerlandesa (São Paulo: Humanitas, 2004)
- (with Rosmarie Zeller) In alle Richtungen gehen. Reden und Aufsätze über Hugo Loetscher (Zürich: Diogenes Verlag, 2005)
- Brasilien mit Brüchen. Schweizer unter dem Kreuz des Südens (Zürich: Verlag der Neuen Zürcher Zeitung, 2007)
- Spirit of Resistance: Dutch Clandestine Literature during the Nazi Occupation (Rochester, NY: Camden House, 2010)
- (with Olf Praamstra and Michiel van Kempen) Shifting the Compass: Pluricontinental Connections in Dutch Colonial and Postcolonial Literature (Newcastle: Cambridge Scholars Publishing, 2013)
- (editor) Hugo Loetscher: Das Entdecken erfinden (Zürich: Diogenes Verlag, 2016)
- The Pinkster King and the King of Kongo: The Forgotten History of America's Dutch-Owned Slaves (Jackson: University of Mississippi Press, 2017)
- From the Kingdom of Kongo to Congo Square: Kongo Dances and the Origins of the Mardi Gras Indians (Lafayette: University of Louisiana at Lafayette Press, 2017)
- Grijs slavernijverleden? Over zwarte milities en redimoesoegedrag (Amsterdam: Amsterdam University Press, 2018)
- The Congo in Flemish Literature: An Anthology of Flemish Prose on the Congo, 1870s - 1990s (Leuven: Leuven University Press, 2020)
- Afro-Atlantic Catholics: America's First Black Christians (Notre Dame: Notre Dame University Press, 2022)
