= Richard Katz (writer) =

German writer

- Plate from Ein Bummel um die Welt
- Born: November 21, 1888; Prague, Austria-Hungary
- Died: November 8, 1968 (aged 79); Muralto, Tessin
- Occupations: Writer and journalist
- Writing career
- Genre: Travel literature

Richard Katz (November 21, 1888 – November 8, 1968), was a German journalist, travel writer, and essayist from Bohemia. While writing both grandiose and humble prose, his style is consistently imbued with a sense of humor, humility and love for all things living.

== Early years ==
Richard Katz was born on November 21, 1888, in Prague, Austria-Hungary (now Czech Republic). His family was an ethnic minority of Sudeten Germans living in the Sudetenland.

After graduation, Katz studied law at The German University in Prague. During his studies, he wrote for a variety of newspapers and magazines. Upon graduation, he began work with the now defunct Vossische Zeitung newspaper in their Prague office. During this placement, he spent a year in East Asia working as a traveling reporter.

== Career in journalism ==
After the First World War, Katz moved to Leipzig and in 1924 he became director of the Leipzig Publishing Company, a position he held for two years. In the years between 1928 and 1930, he was a clerk for the Ullstein publishing house in Berlin. While working in this position, Katz founded the Green Post, a periodical which very quickly reached a circulation of over one million. The financial success allowed Katz to establish himself as an independent writer, giving him the freedom to travel the world while writing of his experiences.

== Travel and publication ==
During the period between 1925 and his death, Katz published nearly thirty-five volumes, mostly personally written journalistic travel books. In the late twenties, his five-book series Die Weite Weite Welt (The Wide, Wide World) emerged, including Ein Bummel um die Welt, Funkelnder Ferner Osten, Heitere Tage mit braunen Menschen, Schnapps Kokain und Lamas, Ernte (name translations below). His other areas of interests were animals – specifically dogs – and gardening. Some of his most refreshing works center around the personalities of dogs, and the methods one must employ to be a successful gardener.

In 1933, Katz emigrated to Switzerland. In 1941, he moved to Brazil obtaining citizenship there. In 1956 he returned to Switzerland where he died in 1968 living above Locarno.

== Selected works ==
=== Works translated into English ===
- Ein Bummel um die Welt (Loafing Around the Globe)
- Funkelnder Ferner Osten (Rays From the East)
- Einsames Leben (Solitary Life)

=== Untranslated German travel books ===
- Heitere Tage mit braunen Menschen (Pleasant Days with Brown Peoples)
- Zickzack durch Südamerika (Zig-Zagging Through South America)
- Ernte (Harvest)
- Die Weltreise in der Johannisnacht (The voyage round the world in the Johannisnacht)
- Mein Inselbuch – erste Erlebnisse in Brasilien (My Island Book – first experiences in Brazil)
- Seltsame Fahrten in Brasilien (Strange travels in Brazil)
- Reisefieber (Travel Fever)
- Begegnungen in Rio (Meetings in Rio)
- Auf dem Amazones (On the Amazon)
- Per Hills schwerster Fall – Ein ernsthafter Kriminalroman (Per Hill's hardest case – a serious detective story)
- Allerhand aus fernem Land (A Great Deal from a Far Off Country)
- Wandernde Welt (Wandering World)
- Gruss aus der Hängematte (Greetings from the Hammock)

=== Stories regarding domestic matters ===
- Kleinode der Natur (Nature's Jewels)
- Nur Tiere. Vier Geschichten (Four Stories on Animals)
- Von Hund zu Hund (From Dog to Dog)
- Übern Gartenhag (On Gardening)
- Steckenpferde (Hobbies)

=== Political work ===
- Drei Gesichter Luzifers. Lärm, Maschinen, Geschäft (The Three Faces of Lucifer: Noise, Machines, Business)

=== Autobiographical works ===
- Leid in der Stadt (Lost in the City)
- Einsames Leben (Solitary Life)

== Literature ==
- Jeroen Dewulf: Brasilien mit Brüchen. Schweizer unter dem Kreuz des Südens, Zürich: NZZ Verlag 2007. ISBN 978-3-03823-349-7
