= Herbert C. Kraft =

American archaeologist

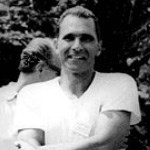
Herbert C. Kraft in the field, c. 1960's.

Herbert Clemens Kraft (1927–2000) was an archaeologist from New Jersey, specializing in prehistory. He wrote numerous books about archaeology in New Jersey, the Lenape and the Paleo-indians of New Jersey, as well as over 170 articles in his career.

== Biography ==
Kraft was born in Elizabeth, New Jersey in 1927. He graduated from Seton Hall University in 1950 and finished his graduate work at Seton Hall in 1961 and at Hunter College in 1969, with degrees in history and anthropology respectively. Kraft later became a professor of anthropology at Seton Hall. He participated in numerous excavations, keeping meticulous notes with details on each site. Those notes were instrumental in documenting and cataloguing the collections Herbert Kraft cultivated while a faculty member at Seton Hall University and comprise the university's museum collection which Kraft named "The Seton Hall University Museum of Anthropology and Archaeology" which includes over 26,000 objects. The museum collection includes objects produced from archaeological digs on Leni Lenape lands in New Jersey, New York, Pennsylvania and northern Delaware. Other Native American cultures are also represented in the collection including; the Aleut peoples of the Aleutian Islands of Alaska and Russia as well as Navajo, Hopi, Pima and Paiute artifacts. Included in the collection is a large display of pottery from the American Southwest and a large collection of moccasins as well as figurines, tobacco pipes, musical instruments and weapons. Other objects in the collections include a smaller amount of Chinese, Japanese, West African, Greco-Roman and Byzantine artifacts. Kraft died of cancer on October 31, 2000 at the age of 73.

In the 1950”s Kraft served as a 6th grade teacher in PS 12 – Elmora Grammar School in Elizabeth, NJ. He would often bring historical items and artifacts from his personal collection for students to see and touch. He had numerous extracted pages of the Guttenberg Bible and artifacts from around the world that he would bring to class.

Kraft was well-known in his field and served as president of the New Jersey Archeological Society in the 1980's, as well as director of Seton Hall University's Archeological Research Center in South Orange, New Jersey. In addition to Kraft's duties as a professor, director of a museum and membership in various organizations, he also found time to curate exhibitions and programs at Waterloo Foundation for the Arts in Andover, New Jersey. Kraft often worked with his son, John T. Kraft, an anthropologist and archeologist.

== Bibliography ==
- Teshoas and Elongated Pebble Tools (1966)
- The First Petroglyph Found in New Jersey (1967)
- The Religion of the Delaware Indians (1968)
- Miller Field Site, Warren County (1970)
- The Plenge Site: A Paleo-Indian Occupation Site in New Jersey (1973)
- A Delaware Indian Symposium (1974)
- The Archaeology of the Tocks Island Area (1975)
- The Rosenkrans Site, an Adena-related Mortuary Complex in the Upper Delaware Valley (1976)
- Paleoindians in New Jersey (1977)
- The Minisink Site: An Investigation into a Late Prehistoric and Early Historic Contact Site in Sussex County (1977)
- The Minisink Site: A Reevaluation of a Late Prehistoric and Early Historic Contact Site in Sussex County (1978)
- Delaware Indians Reminiscences (1978)
- The Historic Minisink Settlements: An Investigation into a Prehistoric and Early Historic Site in Sussex County (1981)
- The Lenape: Archaeology, History, and Ethnography (1986)
- The Lenape Indians of New Jersey (1987)
- The Archaeology and Ethnohistory of the Lower Hudson Valley and Neighboring Regions (1991)
- The Lenape or Delaware Indians: The Original People of New Jersey (1996)
- "Mammoth Frauds in Archaeology" Published in Bulletin of the Archaeological Society of New Jersey No. 51 (1996)
- The Dutch, the Indians, and the Quest for Copper: Pahaquarry and the Old Mine Road (1996)
- The Lenape-Delaware Indian Heritage: 10,000 BC to 2000 AD (2001)
