= Carrier Air Wing Six =

US Navy unit

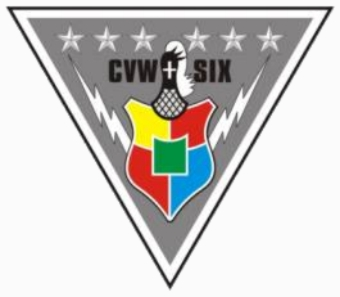
- CVW-6 Insignia
- Active: 1 January 1943 – 1 April 1993
- Country: United States
- Branch: United States Navy
- Type: Carrier air wing
- Engagements: World War II; Vietnam War; Yom Kippur War; Operation Nickel Grass; Operation Urgent Fury; Iran–Iraq War; Operation Earnest Will; Operation Provide Comfort
- Decorations: Navy Unit Commendation (1968); Armed Forces Expeditionary Medal (3)

Carrier Air Wing Six (CVW-6) was a United States Navy aircraft carrier air wing whose operational history spans from the middle of World War II to the end of the Cold War. Established in 1943 as Carrier Air Group Seventeen (CVG-17), it would be re-designated several times during its establishment, including Carrier Air Group Six (CVG-6) as the second unit to be so designated. The first Carrier Air Group Six served for just over two years during World War II, but drew on the history of the Enterprise Air Group established in 1938 and active in the early battles of the Pacific War, being disestablished after the first year of the conflict. During its time in USS Enterprise (CV-6), it was the Navy's only carrier-based air group to carry out three complete tours of duty during World War II.

== History ==
Carrier Air Wing 6 was established on 1 January 1943 as Carrier Air Group 17 (CVG-17).

=== Carrier Air Group 17 (CVG-17) and (CVBG-17) (1943–1946) ===
The Air Group served throughout WWII as CVG-17. After the war, on 22 January 1946 the group was redesignated CVBG-17, the "B" indicating it was configured to be assigned to one of the new Midway class aircraft carriers.

=== Battle Carrier Air Group 5 (1946–1948) ===
On 15 November 1946 the Navy instituted a new Carrier Air Group designation scheme and all air groups assigned to the smaller WWII Essex class carriers were designated CVAG and all configured for the larger Midway class carriers were designated CVBG. The three CVBGs were numbered from 1 through 5 with CVBG-17 becoming CVBG-5. CVBG-5 participated in the shakedown cruises for Essex-class fleet carrier USS Valley Forge (CV-45) and the Midway-class battle aircraft carrier (Note: "Battle aircraft carrier" was used to refer to the new 'big' carriers that came out after the Essex class carriers.) USS Coral Sea (CVB-43).

==== Deployments ====
The Battle Carrier Air Group 5 deployments, 1946–1948
Table 3 denotes the deployments of CVBG-5.

Aircraft carrier	Deployment duration	Operational area	Operating force
USS Valley Forge (CV-45)	24 January 1947 – 18 March 1947	South Atlantic	Shakedown cruise
USS Coral Sea (CVB-43)	19 January 1948 – 5 April 1948	South Atlantic	Shakedown cruise

=== Carrier Air Group 6 (1948–1963) ===
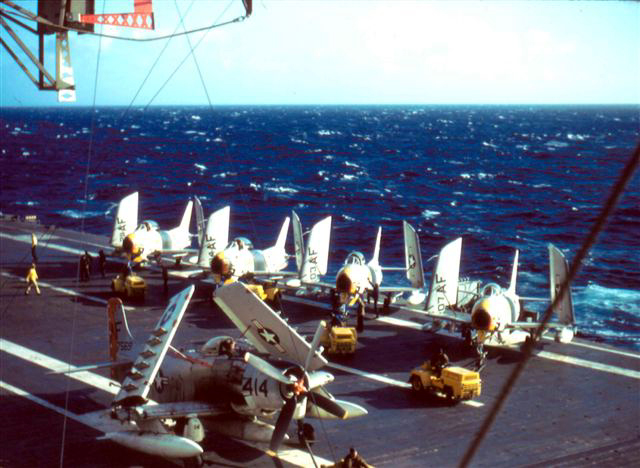
NATO Operation Strikeback (1957)

On 1 September 1948 the Navy again changed the Carrier Air Group designation scheme redesigning all CVAGs and CVBGs to CVGs and CVBG-5 became Carrier Air Group Six (CVG-6) (it was the second use of the CVG-6 designation, the first air group designated CVG-6 was a WWII air group which existed from March 1943 to October 1945). CVG-6 participated in three major NATO naval exercises, 1952's Operation Grand Slam, 1952's Operation Mainbrace and 1957's Operation Strikeback (pictured). as well as making ten deployments to the Mediterranean Sea (see Table 4 below). VF-33 joined CVG-6 aboard Midway in 1954.

The group flew on board the Navy's first nuclear-powered aircraft carrier, the recently commissioned USS Enterprise (CVAN-65), on 22 June 1962. CVG-6 participated with the USS Forrestal (CVA-59) in LantFlex 2–62, a nuclear strike exercise from 6–12 July, providing eight "pre-planned" strikes and six call strikes while operating off the Virginia capes, against targets ranging from the Tidewater area to central Florida. The air group also participated in RipTide III from 3–5 August, which involved long-range simulated nuclear strikes against targets off the Portuguese and Spanish coasts, including 14 strikes and nine call strikes, all opposed.

The group embarked on board the Enterprise during its first deployment to the Mediterranean, passing the Rock of Gibraltar on 16 August 1962. CVG-6 participated in Lafayette II, 7 September, which involved 14 scheduled conventional strikes coordinated with aircraft from USS Forrestal (CVA-59) against multiple targets in southern France, with opposition provided by French air force and naval aircraft. The air group was involved in Indian Summer from 7–8 September, comprising three long-range, simulated nuclear strikes, with fighter escort by F-4Bs from VF-102, against Spanish targets defended by USAF and Spanish commands assigned to NATO. Carrier Air Group Six also provided air support during FallEx/High Heels II from 6–20 September as well as Fall Trap from 23–27 September, which was a NATO amphibious exercise. Enterprise arrived back at Norfolk Naval Station on 11 October 1962.

Carrier Air Group Six subsequently participated in the naval operations during the Cuban Missile Crisis of 1962 as part of Task Force 135, a two-carrier strike force consisting of CAG-6's home carrier, the Enterprise, and the supercarrier USS Independence (CVA-62), operating south of the Windward Passage, between Cuba and the island of Hispaniola and southward, in the vicinity of latitude 18°N, longitude 74°30'W. CAG-6 was augmented with ten additional A4D-4N Skyhawks of Attack Squadron 34 (VA-34) during the night of 26/27 October 1962. For its participation in the Cuban Missile Crisis, Carrier Air Group Six received the Armed Forces Expeditionary Medal.

==== Deployments ====
The deployments of CVG-6 are listed below.

Aircraft carrier	Deployment duration	Operational area	Operating force
USS Franklin D. Roosevelt (CVB-42)	27 October 1949 – 23 November 1949	North Atlantic	U.S. Second Task Fleet
USS Franklin D. Roosevelt (CVB-42)	10 January 1951 – 18 May 1951	Mediterranean	U.S. Sixth Fleet
USS Midway (CVB-41)	9 January 1952 – 5 May 1952	Mediterranean	U.S. Sixth Fleet
USS Midway (CVB-41)	25 February 1952 – 16 March 1952	Operation Grand Slam	CINCAFSOUTH
USS Midway (CVB-41)	26 August 1952 – 8 October 1952	Operation Mainbrace	SACLANT
USS Midway (CVA-41)	1 December 1952 – 19 May 1953	Mediterranean	U.S. Sixth Fleet
USS Midway (CVA-41)	9 January 1954 – 4 August 1954	Mediterranean	U.S. Sixth Fleet
USS Lake Champlain (CVA-39)	9 October 1955 – 3 April 1956	Mediterranean	U.S. Sixth Fleet
USS Intrepid (CVA-11)	3 September 1957 – 22 October 1957	Operation Strikeback	SACLANT
USS Intrepid (CVA-11)	13 February 1959 – 20 August 1959	Mediterranean	U.S. Sixth Fleet
USS Intrepid (CVA-11)	4 August 1960 – 17 February 1961	Mediterranean	U.S. Sixth Fleet
USS Intrepid (CVA-11)	3 August 1961 – 1 March 1962	Mediterranean	U.S. Sixth Fleet
USS Enterprise (CVAN-65)	3 August 1962 – 11 October 1962	Mediterranean	U.S. Sixth Fleet
USS Enterprise (CVAN-65)	19 October 1962 – 6 December 1962	Caribbean	Task Force 135
USS Enterprise (CVAN-65)	6 February 1963 – 4 September 1963	Mediterranean	U.S. Sixth Fleet

==== Air group composition ====
===== Operation Grand Slam (1952) =====
Carrier Air Group Six embarked on USS Midway (CVB-41) during NATO Operation Grand Slam:

- Fighter Squadron 61 (VF-61)
- Fighter Squadron 41 (VF-41)
- Fighter Squadron 21 (VF-21)
- Attack Squadron 25 (VA-25)
- Marine Fighter Squadron 225 (VMF-225): Vought F4U-4 Corsair
- Fleet Composite Squadron 12 (VC-12) Detachment 41
- Fleet Composite Squadron 33 (VC-33) Detachment 41
- Fleet Composite Squadron 62 (VC-62) Detachment 41
- Utility Helicopter Squadron 2 (HU-2) Detachment 41

===== Operation Mainbrace (1952) =====
Carrier Air Group Six embarked on USS Midway (CVB-41) during NATO Operation Mainbrace:

- Fighter Squadron 61 (VF-61)
- Fighter Squadron 42 (VF-42)
- Fighter Squadron 41 (VF-41)
- Fighter Squadron 21 (VF-21)
- Attack Squadron 25 (VA-25)
- Fleet Composite Squadron 8 (VC-8)
- Fleet Composite Squadron 12 (VC-12) Detachment 41
- Fleet Composite Squadron 33 (VC-33) Detachment 41
- Fleet Composite Squadron 62 (VC-62) Detachment 41
- Utility Helicopter Squadron 2 (HU-2) Detachment 41

===== Operation Strikeback (1957) =====
Carrier Air Group Six embarked on USS Intrepid (CVA-11) during NATO Operation Strikeback:

- Fighter Squadron 71 (VF-71)
- Fighter Squadron 33 (VF-33)
- Attack Squadron 66 (VA-66)
- Attack Squadron 25 (VA-25)
- Heavy Attack Squadron 11 (VAH-11)
- All-Weather Attack Squadron 33 (VA(AW)-33) Detachment 33
- Light Photographic Squadron 62 (VFP-62) Detachment 33
- Airborne Early Warning Squadron 12 (VAW-12) Detachment 33
- Utility Helicopter Squadron 2 (HU-2) Detachment 33

===== Cuban Missile Crisis (1962) =====
Carrier Air Group Six embarked on USS Enterprise (CVAN-65) during the Cuban Missile Crisis:

- Fighter Squadron 102 (VF-102)
- Fighter Squadron 33 (VF-33)
- Attack Squadron 76 (VA-76)
- Attack Squadron 66 (VA-66)
- Attack Squadron 65 (VA-65)
- Marine Fighter Attack Squadron 225 (VMA-225)
- Heavy Attack Squadron 7 (VAH-7)
- Airborne Early Warning Squadron 12 (VAW-12) Detachment 65
- Light Photographic Squadron 62 (VFP-62) Detachment 65
- Utility Helicopter Squadron 2 (HU-2) Detachment 65

=== Carrier Air Wing 6 (1963–1993) ===
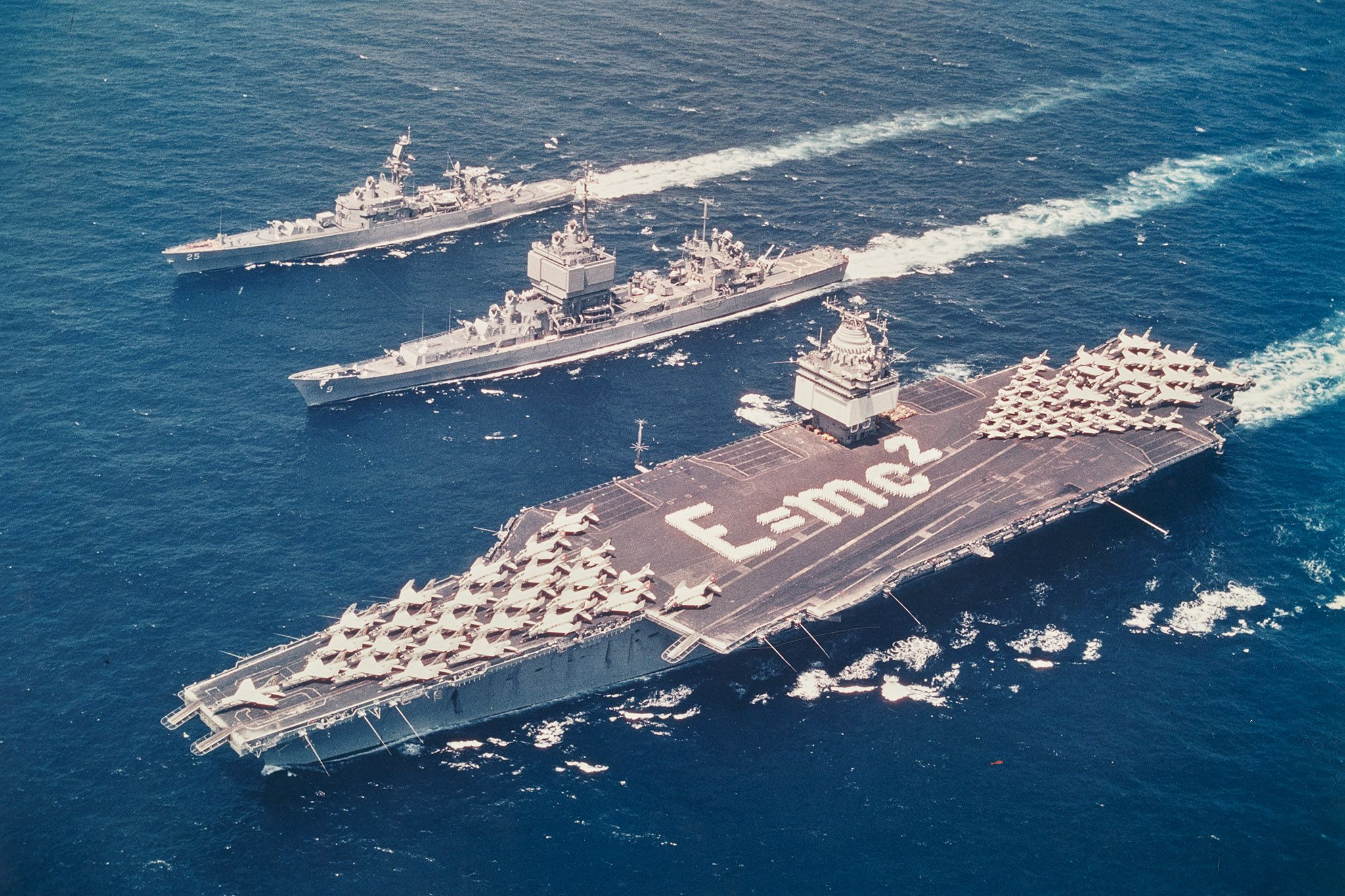
Operation Sea Orbit (1964)

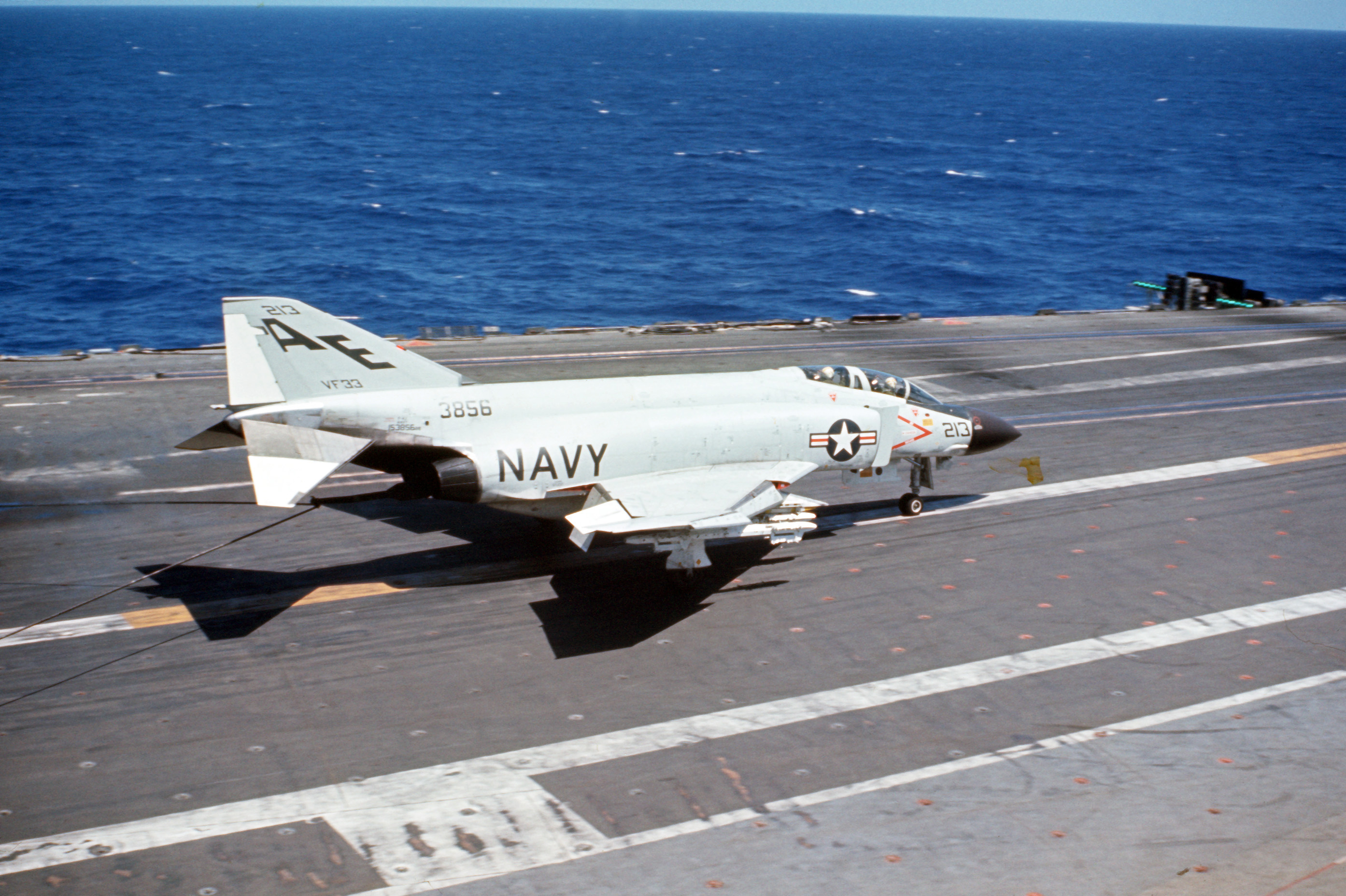
VF-33 – Vietnam (1968)

On 20 December 1963 all Carrier Air Groups were redesignated Carrier Air Wings and Carrier Air Group Six became Carrier Air Wing Six (CVW-6). The air wing participated in Operation Sea Orbit, the first around-the-world voyage made by nuclear-powered surface ships, in 1964 (pictured).

CVW-6 embarked on the new supercarrier USS America (CVA-66) for its 1965 shakedown cruise, and during that ship's second deployment to the Mediterranean Sea, CVW-6 was operating with the U.S. Sixth Fleet when the Six-Day War broke out between Israel and its Arab neighbors on 5 June 1967. America's escorting destroyers detected an unknown submarine contact on 7 June, and a Sikorsky SH-3A Sea King from Helicopter Antisubmarine Squadron (HS-9) assisted in tracking this contact. CVW-6 aircraft provided air cover for the stricken USS Liberty (AGTR-5), which had been attacked by Israeli military forces, and it also dispatched two helicopters to evacuate the seriously injured to the America.

Carrier Air Wing Six made its first combat deployment in 1968 upon the America. During this deployment, CVW-6 spent a total of 112 days at Yankee Station off the coast of Vietnam, attacking roads, waterways, trucks, bridges, as well as lighters, barges, and other logistical support watercraft. They also attacked petroleum storage areas, truck parks, and cave storage areas to impede the flow of men and war materials to the south during the Tet Offensive. On 10 July 1968, Lt. Roy Cash Jr. (pilot) and Lt. (j.g.) Joseph E. Kain Jr. (radar intercept officer), flying in an F-4J Phantom from Fighter Squadron 33 (VF-33), downed a MiG-21 about 17 miles (27 km) northwest of Vinh, North Vietnam. This was the first MiG "kill" in the Vietnam War for CVW-6. America and Carrier Air Wing Six were awarded the Navy Unit Commendation for this deployment.

CVW-6 then left the America for another carrier, the USS Franklin D. Roosevelt (CVA-42). This carrier, along with USS Independence (CV-62) and USS Guadalcanal (LPH-7), stood by to execute the possible evacuation of foreign civilians during the Yom Kippur War in October 1973. CVW-6 provided air cover during the 1983 invasion of Grenada (Operation Urgent Fury) while embarked on board the USS Independence (CV-62). During that ship's subsequent deployment to the Mediterranean Sea, CVW-6 conducted air strikes against Syrian positions that were attacking U.S. Marine positions in Lebanon. Carrier Air Group Six received the Armed Forces Expeditionary Medal for Operation Urgent Fury.

Beginning in 1986, Carrier Air Wing Six embarked on board the USS Forrestal (CV-59). It participated in a joint U.S.-Egyptian training exercise (Operation Sea Wind) and Display Determination '86, which featured low-level coordinated strikes and air combat maneuvering training over Turkey. CVW-6 subsequently participated in Ocean Safari '87, a six-week cruise in the North Atlantic which was highlighted by operations with NATO forces posing as aggressors lurking in Norwegian fjords. A year later, the air wing participated in Ocean Venture '88 in the Atlantic, the Gulf of Mexico, and the Caribbean, and then provided air support for Operation Earnest Will.

During its final overseas deployment, CVW-6 participated in three multi-lateral exercises (Harmonie Sud Est, Iles D'Or, and Display Determination '91), and also provided air support for Operation Provide Comfort. Carrier Air Group Six received the Armed Forces Expeditionary Medal for Provide Comfort. (see Table 5 below).

==== Deployments ====
The deployments of CVW-6 are listed below.

Aircraft carrier	Deployment duration	Operational area	Operating force
USS Enterprise (CVAN-65)	8 February 1964 – 31 July 1964	Mediterranean	U.S. Sixth Fleet
USS Enterprise (CVAN-65)	31 July 1964 – 3 October 1964	Operation Sea Orbit	Task Force One
USS America (CVA-66)	1 May 1965 – 1 July 1965	South Atlantic/Caribbean	Shakedown cruise
USS America (CVA-66)	29 November 1965 – 10 July 1966	Mediterranean	U.S. Sixth Fleet
USS America (CVA-66)	10 January 1967 – 20 September 1967	Mediterranean	U.S. Sixth Fleet
USS America (CVA-66)	10 April 1968 – 16 December 1968	Yankee Station	Task Force 77
USS Franklin D. Roosevelt (CVA-42)	2 January 1970 – 27 July 1970	Mediterranean	U.S. Sixth Fleet
USS Franklin D. Roosevelt (CVA-42)	29 January 1971 – 18 July 1971	Mediterranean	U.S. Sixth Fleet
USS Franklin D. Roosevelt (CVA-42)	15 February 1972 – 11 December 1972	Mediterranean	U.S. Sixth Fleet
USS Franklin D. Roosevelt (CVA-42)	14 September 1973 – 17 March 1974	Mediterranean/Operation Nickel Grass	U.S. Sixth Fleet
USS Franklin D. Roosevelt (CV-42)	3 January 1975 – 16 July 1975	Mediterranean	U.S. Sixth Fleet
USS America (CV-66)	15 April 1976 – 25 October 1976	Mediterranean	U.S. Sixth Fleet
USS America (CV-66)	10 June 1977 – 19 July 1977	South Atlantic	Task Group 20.4
USS America (CV-66)	25 September 1977 – 25 April 1978	Mediterranean	U.S. Sixth Fleet
USS Independence (CV-62)	28 June 1979 – 14 December 1979	Mediterranean	U.S. Sixth Fleet
USS Independence (CV-62)	19 November 1980 – 10 June 1981	Mediterranean/Indian Ocean	COMUSNAVEUR
USS Independence (CV-62)	7 June 1982 – 21 December 1982	Mediterranean	U.S. Sixth Fleet
USS Independence (CV-62)	25 October 1983 – 2 November 1983	Operation Urgent Fury	U.S. Second Fleet
USS Independence (CV-62)	18 October 1983 – 11 April 1984	Mediterranean	U.S. Sixth Fleet
USS Independence (CV-62)	16 October 1984 – 19 February 1985	Mediterranean/Indian Ocean	COMUSNAVEUR
USS Forrestal (CV-59)	4 June 1986 – 10 November 1986	Mediterranean	U.S. Sixth Fleet
USS Forrestal (CV-59)	28 August 1987 – 8 October 1987	Ocean Safari '87	SACLANT
USS Forrestal (CV-59)	25 April 1988 – 7 October 1988	Mediterranean/Indian Ocean	NAVCENT
USS Forrestal (CV-59)	4 November 1989 – 12 April 1990	Mediterranean	U.S. Sixth Fleet
USS Forrestal (CV-59)	30 May 1991 – 21 December 1991	Operation Provide Comfort	NAVCENT

==== Air wing composition ====
===== Operation Sea Orbit (1964) =====
Carrier Air Wing Six embarked on USS Enterprise (CVAN-65) during Operation Sea Orbit:

- Fighter Squadron 102 (VF-102)
- Fighter Squadron 33 (VF-33)
- Attack Squadron 76 (VA-76)
- Attack Squadron 66 (VA-66)
- Attack Squadron 65 (VA-65)
- Attack Squadron 64 (VA-64)
- Heavy Attack Squadron 7 (VAH-7)
- Airborne Early Warning Squadron 33 (VAW-33) Detachment 65
- Airborne Early Warning Squadron 12 (VAW-12) Detachment 65
- Light Photographic Squadron 62 (VFP-62) Detachment 65
- Utility Helicopter Squadron 2 (HU-2) Detachment 65

===== Six-Day War (1967) =====
Carrier Air Wing Six embarked on USS America (CVA-66) during the Six-Day War:

- Fighter Squadron 102 (VF-102)
- Fighter Squadron 33 (VF-33)
- Attack Squadron 66 (VA-66)
- Attack Squadron 64 (VA-64)
- Attack Squadron 36 (VA-36)
- Reconnaissance Attack Squadron 5 (RVAH-5)
- Heavy Attack Squadron 10 (VAH-10 ) Detachment 66
- Carrier Airborne Early Warning Squadron 122 (VAW-122) Detachment 66
- Carrier Airborne Early Warning Squadron 33 (VAW-33) Detachment 66
- Carrier Airborne Early Warning Squadron 12 (VAW-12) Detachment 66
- Helicopter Anti-submarine Squadron 9 (HS-9) Detachment 66
- Helicopter Combat Support Squadron 2 (HC-2) Detachment 66

===== Vietnam War (1968) =====
Carrier Air Wing Six embarked on USS America (CVA-66) during the Vietnam War:

- Fighter Squadron 102 (VF-102)
- Fighter Squadron 33 (VF-33)
- Attack Squadron 76 (VA-76)
- Attack Squadron 66 (VA-66)
- Attack Squadron 64 (VA-64)
- Heavy Attack Squadron 7 (VAH-7)
- Airborne Early Warning Squadron 33 (VAW-33) Detachment 66
- Airborne Early Warning Squadron 12 (VAW-12) Detachment 66
- Light Photographic Squadron 62 (VFP-62) Detachment 66
- Utility Helicopter Squadron 2 (HU-2) Detachment 66

===== Yom Kippur War (1973) =====
Carrier Air Wing Six embarked on USS Franklin D. Roosevelt (CVA-42) during the Yom Kippur War:

- Fighter Squadron 41 (VF-41)
- Attack Squadron 176 (VA-176)
- Attack Squadron 87 (VA-87)
- Attack Squadron 15 (VA-15)
- Photographic Reconnaissance Squadron 63 (VFP-63) Detachment 42
- Carrier Airborne Early Warning Squadron 121 (VAW-121)
- Helicopter Combat Support Squadron 2 (HC-2) Detachment 42

===== Operation Urgent Fury (1983) =====
Carrier Air Wing Six embarked on USS Independence (CV-62) during Operation Urgent Fury:

- Fighter Squadron 32 (VF-32)
- Fighter Squadron 14 (VF-14)
- Attack Squadron 176 (VA-176)
- Attack Squadron 87 (VA-87)
- Attack Squadron 15 (VA-15)
- Airborne Early Warning Squadron 122 (VAW-122)
- Tactical Electronic Warfare Squadron 131 (VAQ-131)
- Helicopter Anti-submarine Squadron 15 (HS-15)
- Air Anti-submarine Squadron 28 (VS-28)

===== Ocean Safari 1987 =====
Carrier Air Wing Six embarked on USS Forrestal (CV-59) during NATO exercise Ocean Safari 1987:

- Fighter Squadron 31 (VF-31)
- Fighter Squadron 11 (VF-11)
- Attack Squadron 176 (VA-176)
- Attack Squadron 105 (VA-105)
- Attack Squadron 37 (VA-37)
- Airborne Early Warning Squadron 122 (VAW-122)
- Tactical Electronic Warfare Squadron 132 (VAQ-132)
- Helicopter Anti-submarine Squadron 15 (HS-15)
- Air Anti-submarine Squadron 28 (VS-28)

===== Operation Earnest Will (1988) =====
Carrier Air Wing Six embarked on USS Forrestal (CV-59) during Operation Earnest Will:

- Fighter Squadron 31 (VF-31)
- Fighter Squadron 11 (VF-11)
- Attack Squadron 176 (VA-176)
- Attack Squadron 105 (VA-105)
- Attack Squadron 37 (VA-37)
- Airborne Early Warning Squadron 122 (VAW-122)
- Tactical Electronic Warfare Squadron 132 (VAQ-132)
- Helicopter Anti-submarine Squadron 15 (HS-15)
- Air Anti-submarine Squadron 28 (VS-28)

===== Operation Provide Comfort (1991) =====
Carrier Air Wing Six embarked on USS Forrestal (CV-59) during Operation Provide Comfort:

- Fighter Squadron 31 (VF-31)
- Fighter Squadron 11 (VF-11)
- Attack Squadron 176 (VA-176)
- Strike Fighter Squadron 137 (VFA-137)
- Strike Fighter Squadron 132 (VFA-132)
- Airborne Early Warning Squadron 122 (VAW-122)
- Tactical Electronic Warfare Squadron 133 (VAQ-133)
- Helicopter Anti-submarine Squadron 15 (HS-15)
- Air Anti-submarine Squadron 28 (VS-28)

=== Disestablishment ===
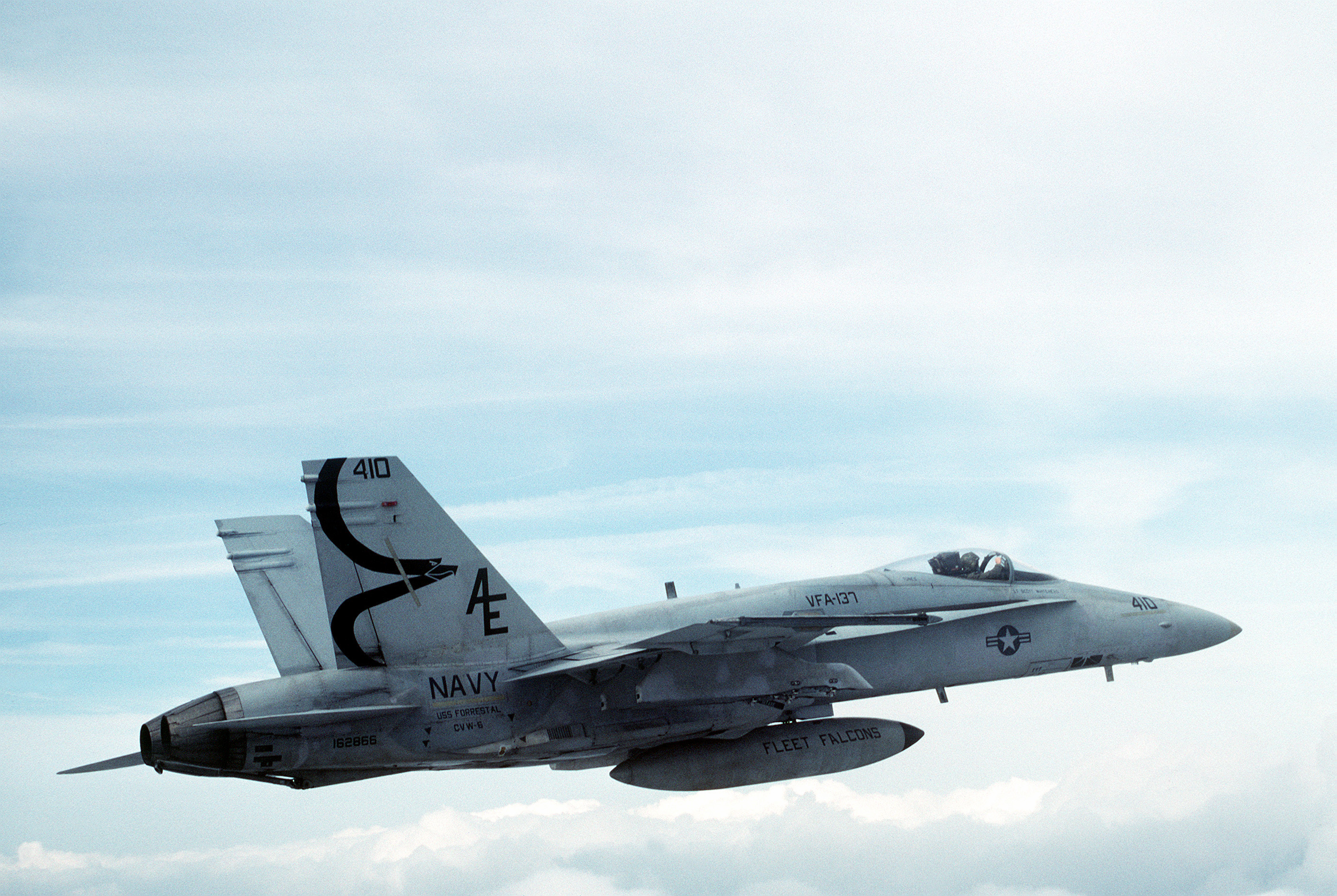
F/A-18A – VFA-137 (1991)

Carrier Air Wing Six shifted to USS Forrestal (CV-59) when USS Independence (CV-62) underwent its Service Life Extension Program (SLEP) overhaul at the Philadelphia Naval Shipyard in 1986. Following the completion of its SLEP, Independence sailed to its new home port at the Naval Air Station North Island with Carrier Air Wing 5. With the shifting of Forrestal to a naval aviation training role as AVT-59, plus post-Cold War budget cutbacks, Carrier Air Wing Six (CVW-6) was disestablished on 1 April 1993.

==== Final composition ====
Carrier Air Wing Six embarked in USS Forrestal (CV-59):

- Attack Squadron 176 (VA-176)
- Strike Fighter Squadron 137 (VFA-137)
- Strike Fighter Squadron 132 (VFA-132)
- Fighter Squadron 31 (VF-31)
- Fighter Squadron 11 (VF-11)
- Airborne Early Warning Squadron 122 (VAW-122)
- Tactical Electronic Warfare Squadron 133 (VAQ-133)
- Helicopter Anti-submarine Squadron 15 (HS-15)
- Air Anti-submarine Squadron 28 (VS-28)

== Awards and commendations ==

- Navy Unit Commendation (1968)

- Armed Forces Expeditionary Medal
  - Cuban Missile Crisis (1962)
  - Operation Urgent Fury (1983)
  - Operation Earnest Will (1988)

== Other groups associated with the CVG-6 designation ==
On 15 March 1943 the first Carrier Air Group to bear the designation Carrier Air Group SIX (CVG-6) was established. It served through the remainder of WWII and was disestablished on 29 October 1945, that air group replaced the Enterprise Air Group aboard USS Enterprise (CV-6). The Enterprise Air Group had been established on 1 July 1938 and disestablished on 1 September 1942. Due to the manner in which the United States Navy determines unit lineage, in which a unit's lineage begins at establishment and ends at disestablishment, the Enterprise Air Group, Carrier Air Group SIX, and Carrier Air Wing SIX are three separate and distinct units and do not share lineages.

== See also ==
- Edward "Butch" O'Hare

== Other sources ==
- Francillon, René (1988). Tonkin Gulf Yacht Club US Carrier Operations off Vietnam. Annapolis, Maryland: United States Naval Institute Press. ISBN 978-0-87021-696-1.
- —— (1978). US Navy Carrier Air Group: Pacific 1941-1945. Oxford: Osprey Publishing. ISBN 978-0-85045-291-4.
- Lundstrom, John B. (1976). The First South Pacific Campaign: Pacific Fleet Strategy, December 1941 – June 1942. Annapolis, Maryland: United States Naval Institute Press. ISBN 978-0-87021-185-0.
- —— (1976). The First Team: Pacific Naval Air Combat from Pearl Harbor to Midway. Annapolis, Maryland: United States Naval Institute Press. ISBN 978-0-87021-189-8.
- —— (1994). The First Team and the Guadalcanal Campaign Naval Fighter Combat from August to November 1942. Annapolis, Maryland: United States Naval Institute Press. ISBN 978-1-59114-472-4.
- Nichols, John B. (Cmdr., USN ret.) (1987). On Yankee Station; the Naval Air War Over Vietnam. Annapolis, Maryland: United States Naval Institute Press. ISBN 978-1-85310-008-6.
- Reynolds, Clark G. (2001). The Fast Carriers: The Forging of an Air Navy. Annapolis, Maryland: United States Naval Institute Press. ISBN 978-1-55750-998-7.
- Smith, Douglas V. (2006). Carrier Battles: Command Decision in Harm's Way. Annapolis, Maryland: United States Naval Institute Press. ISBN 978-1-59114-794-7.
- St. John, Philip A. (2004). USS Hancock CV/CVA-19: Fighting Hannah. Nashville, Tennessee: Turner Publishing Company. ISBN 978-1-56311-420-5.
- Stafford, Edward P. (1962). The Big E: The Story of the USS Enterprise. Annapolis, Maryland: United States Naval Institute Press. ISBN 978-1-55750-998-7.
- USS Wasp CV 18. Turner Publishing Company. 1999. ISBN 978-1-56311-404-5.
- Utz, Curtis A. (2005). Cordon of Steel: The US Navy And the Cuban Missile Crisis. Honolulu, Hawaii: University Press of the Pacific. ISBN 978-1-4102-2123-0.
- Wise, Harold Lee (2007). Inside the Danger Zone: The U.S. Military in the Persian Gulf, 1987–1988. Annapolis, Maryland: United States Naval Institute Press. ISBN 978-1-59114-970-5.
