= VA42 =

VA-42 or VA 42 may refer to:

- Attack Squadron 42, an aviation unit of the United States Navy
- Virginia State Route 42, a road in the Commonwealth of Virginia, USA
