= VA176 =

VA-176 has the following meanings:

- Attack Squadron 176 (U.S. Navy)
- State Route 176 (Virginia)
