= Max Leslie =

Naval aviator in the US Navy

Maxwell Franklin Leslie
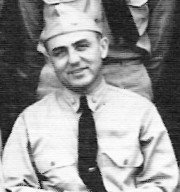
- Maxwell F. Leslie in April 1942
- Born: October 24, 1902; Seattle, Washington, U.S.
- Died: September 26, 1985 (aged 82); San Diego, California, U.S.
- Military career
- Allegiance: United States
- Branch: United States Navy
- Service years: 1926–1956
- Rank: Rear Admiral
- Commands: VB-3; Carrier Air Wing 3
- Conflicts: World War II: Doolittle Raid; Battle of Midway
- Awards: Navy Cross; Bronze Star Medal; Navy Commendation Ribbon

Maxwell Franklin Leslie (24 October 1902 – 26 September 1985) was a naval aviator in the United States Navy during World War II. He is credited with having played a major part in the Battle of Midway.

== Early life ==
Born in Seattle, Washington, on 24 October 1902, Leslie attended the University of Washington before entering the United States Naval Academy in 1922, graduating in 1926, the same class as Carlton Hutchins, Wade McClusky, Howard Gilmore, and Lofton R. Henderson.

== Naval career ==
Leslie was commissioned ensign in 1926, and received flight training at Naval Air Station Pensacola in 1929. He qualified as a naval aviator in 1930. When the United States entered World War II, he was executive officer of Bombing Squadron 3 (VB-3) aboard USS Saratoga. He flew with his squadron off USS Enterprise, while escorting USS Hornet on the Doolittle Raid.

=== Battle of Midway ===
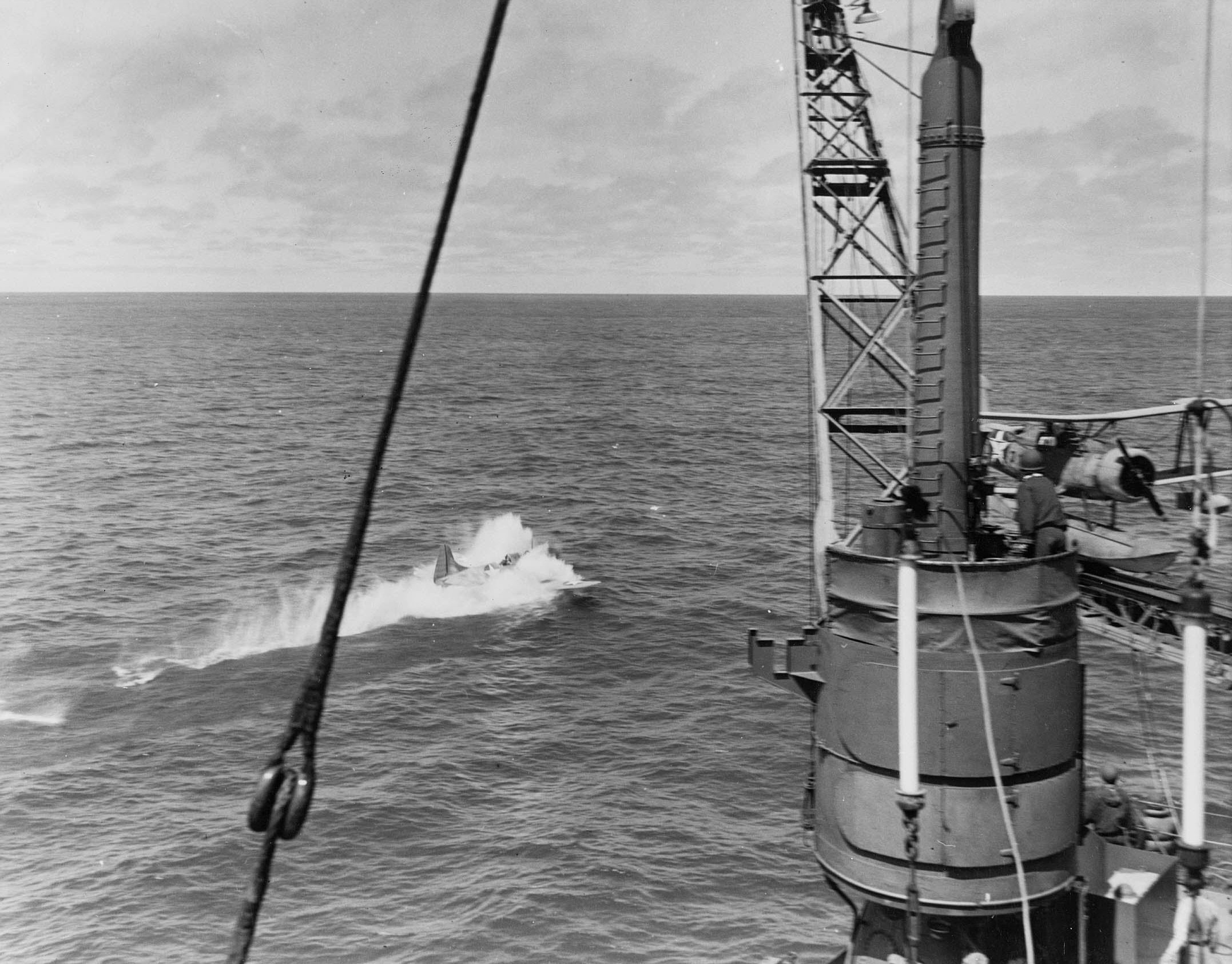
Lieutenant Commander Maxwell Leslie successfully ditching due to lack of fuel, 13:48, 4 Jun 1942

Leslie was in command of VB-3, operating from USS Yorktown during Midway. Following the Japanese destroyer Arashi that had been counterattacking USS Nautilus, Leslie and Lieutenant Commander Wade McClusky, from Enterprise, managed to arrive above the Japanese task force at the precise moment its combat air patrol had been drawn down to the deck to repel Yorktown's torpedo bombers, and at the moment of the First Air Fleet's maximum vulnerability. With the Japanese Zeros too low to be effective, the SBD Dauntlesses of McClusky's squadron of 20 dive bombers and Max Leslie's squadron of 17 dive bombers poured down through the miraculously open sky to unload their bombs on the Japanese carriers, their hangar decks cluttered with confused ranks of recovered and warming up aircraft, snaking fuel hoses, and stacks of munitions from the various rearmament operations. Leslie himself did not have a bomb as it was accidentally released via a faulty electrical arming switch. Nevertheless, he also dived with the rest of the SBDs, strafing carrier decks.

In just five minutes, Enterprise's Scouting Squadron Six and Bombing Squadron Six destroyed two Japanese fleet carriers. Kaga was abandoned at 1700 and sank at 1925. Akagi was abandoned just after Kaga went down, and was scuttled before dawn June 5. Attacking nearly simultaneously with McClusky's SBDs, Yorktown's VB-3, led by Leslie, inflicted heavy damage on Sōryū, and she also sank that evening. Leslie and his wingman Lieutenant Junior Grade P.A. Holmberg returned to Yorktown, but as Yorktown was under attack by Japanese planes and their fuel was exhausted, they ditched near the cruiser USS Astoria. Leslie, Holmberg, and their gunners were rescued by one of the cruiser's whaleboats.

A single carrier, Hiryū, which was ten miles to the north of the other three carriers, escaped damage the morning of June 4, but was sunk on June 5. For heroism at the battle, Leslie was awarded the Navy Cross.

Leslie continued to serve overseas during World War II:

from	to	rank	position	ship/station
May 1940	December 1941	LT/LCDR	XO Bombing Squadron 3	NAS North Island
December 1941	February 1942	LCDR	XO Bombing Squadron 3	USS Saratoga (CV-3)
February 1942	April 1942	LCDR	CO Bombing Squadron 3	NAS Kaneohe Bay
April 1942	June 1942	LCDR	CO Bombing Squadron 3	USS Yorktown (CV-5)
June 1942	November 1942	CDR	Commander, Enterprise Air Group	USS Enterprise (CV-6)
November 1942	January 1943	CDR	staff	NAS Jacksonville
January 1943	March 1943	CDR	CO	NAS Daytona Beach
March 1943	November 1943	CDR	CO	Naval Air Gunnery School, Hollywood, Florida
November 1943	April 1944	CDR	student	Army and Navy Staff College
April 1944	June 1944	CDR	instructor	Command and General Staff College
June 1944	August 1944	CAPT	Operations Officer	ComAirForWestCarolines
August 1944	December 1944	CAPT	Operations Officer, 2nd MAW	Naval Operating Base Espiritu Santo
December 1944	August 1945	CAPT	OIC Air Support Control	ComPhibForPac
August 1945	September 1945	CAPT	CO Air Support Control 8	ComPhibForPac

=== Later career and awards ===
Leslie spent the rest of his career after the war in various ships and shore stations and retired in 1956. In addition to the Navy Cross, he was presented the Bronze Star Medal with combat "V" and the Navy Commendation Ribbon, the Presidential Unit Citation to Enterprise, American Defense Service Medal, Fleet Clasp, American Campaign Medal, Asiatic-Pacific Campaign Medal, World War II Victory Medal and the National Defense Service Medal.

Leslie died in San Diego, California, on 26 September 1985.

== In popular culture ==
Leslie was depicted by Monte Markham in the 1976 film Midway.
