= C. Wade McClusky =

United States Navy admiral (1902–1976)

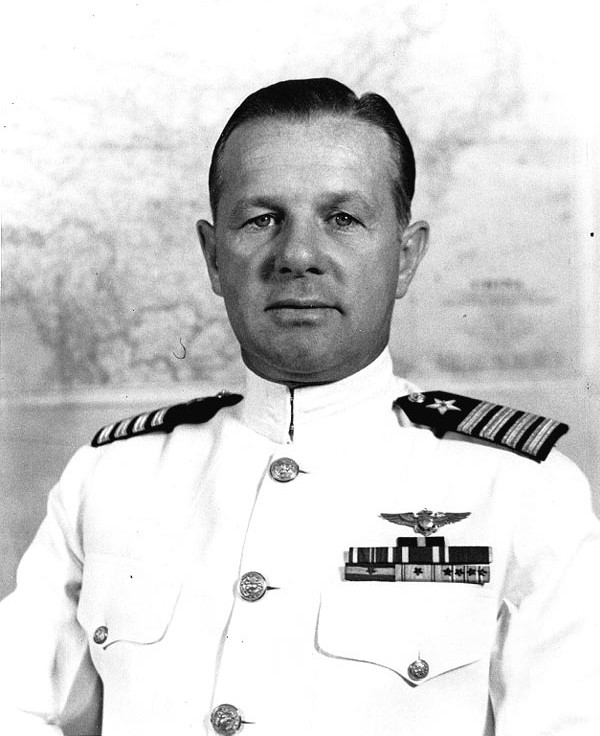
- McClusky in 1943–1944
- Born: Clarence Wade McClusky, Jr. June 1, 1902; Buffalo, New York, U.S.
- Died: June 27, 1976 (aged 74); Bethesda, Maryland, U.S.
- Burial place: United States Naval Academy Cemetery
- Military career
- Allegiance: United States
- Branch: United States Navy
- Service years: 1922–1956
- Rank: Rear admiral
- Nicknames: "Wade", "Mac"
- Commands: NAS Glenview; USS Corregidor (CVE-58); Enterprise Air Group 6 VF-6
- Conflicts: World War II: Battle of Midway; Korean War
- Awards: Navy Cross; Legion of Merit; Distinguished Flying Cross; Purple Heart; Air Medal

Rear Admiral Clarence Wade McClusky, Jr., (June 1, 1902 – June 27, 1976) was a United States Navy aviator during World War II and the early Cold War. He played a major part in the Battle of Midway; in the words of Admiral Chester Nimitz, McClusky's decision to continue the search for the enemy and his judgment as to where the enemy might be found, "decided the fate of our carrier task force and our forces at Midway".

== Early life ==
McClusky was born in Buffalo, New York. He was the second of five children to Clarence Wade McClusky Sr., an accountant, and Mary Anastasia Stears "May" McClusky. Both of his parents were born in Pennsylvania, but had spent their adulthoods in Buffalo. Wade Sr. was a Presbyterian of Scotch-Irish ancestry, while May was an Irish Catholic. Wade Sr. refused to raise the children in the Catholic faith, and forbade May from attending Catholic Mass.

McClusky disliked his first name Clarence, and always signed his name as "C. Wade McClusky". He attended South Park High School in Buffalo, where he was a clever and hard-working student. McClusky graduated in 1918 at the age of 16. As his family's financial situation was strained, he sought employment instead of applying to colleges. His first job involved cleaning the interiors of railroad tanker cars, and associated exposure to various chemicals. McClusky's son Philip recalled in 2015: "He told me once that it was a miserable job and as a result he was determined to go to college or the academy!"

Wade Sr. would die in an automobile crash on October 8, 1928, after which May returned to the Catholic Church. May persuaded one of McClusky's sisters to convert to Catholicism, but McClusky himself became an Episcopalian.

== Naval aviator and instructor ==
McClusky graduated from the United States Naval Academy in 1926—the same class as Max Leslie, Carlton Hutchins, Howard W. Gilmore, and Lofton R. Henderson—and became a Naval Aviator three years later. Over the next decade, he served in several air units, as well as on command staff, as an instructor at the Naval Academy and at shore facilities. In 1940, he was assigned to Fighting Squadron Six (VF-6), based on USS Enterprise, and assumed command of that squadron in April 1941.

== World War II ==
Lieutenant Commander McClusky became Enterprise's air group commander in April 1942.

During the Battle of Midway, while leading his air group's scout bombers on June 4, 1942, he made the critical tactical decision that led to the sinking of three of Japan's fleet carriers, Soryu, Kaga and Akagi.

When McClusky could not find the Japanese carriers where he expected them, and with his air group's fuel running dangerously low, he began a box search and on the second leg spotted the Arashi steaming north at flank speed. Arashi had stayed behind to attack the submarine USS Nautilus, which had been harassing the Japanese fleet. Surmising that Arashi must be following the main fleet, McClusky ordered a change in course in the same direction as Arashi. This led him directly to the enemy carriers.

McClusky gave the order to attack, which resulted in confusion, with both squadrons of 31 aircraft diving on the closest carrier, Kaga. Doctrine called for McClusky's forward squadron to attack the more distant carrier, Akagi, and the squadron behind his to attack Kaga. Two simultaneous carrier attacks would have made it harder for Japanese Zeros to respond. Lieutenant Richard Best, who commanded the other squadron and was considered to be its best pilot, noticed the error and pulled out with two wingmen to attack Akagi. Best scored a direct hit amidships and a wingman a near miss that disabled the rudder and rendered Akagi immobile. The other 28 dive bombers, some of which nearly collided with each other, scored at least four hits on Kaga, leaving it a burning wreck. As he pulled out of his dive, McClusky's plane was pounced on by two Zeros, which put 52 holes in his plane and a bullet through his shoulder. His gunner, ARM1C Walter Chocholousek, shot down one of the Zeros. His controls partially shot up, McClusky landed his plane on Enterprise.

The confused attack order was later explained as a radio error due to multiple people speaking at the same time. McClusky had been a fighter pilot before becoming Air Group Commander and was familiar with dive bombing doctrine, as was Best. McClusky's decision to lead his squadron against Kaga was in keeping with doctrine that allowed the on-scene commander to choose targets.

Within minutes, three of the four Japanese carriers had been turned into burning hulks. The Sōryū had been hit by Yorktown's dive bombers. The remaining carrier in the IJN's Midway task force, Hiryū, was damaged six hours later. The crippled carriers were sunk by torpedoes from Japanese escort ships to prevent their capture.

McClusky was awarded the Navy Cross for his actions.

Later in World War II, he commanded the escort carrier USS Corregidor.

== After the war ==
McClusky served in a variety of staff and shore positions in the later 1940s. During the Korean War, he was chief of staff to the commanders of the First and Seventh Fleets. He commanded Naval Air Station Glenview, Illinois, in 1952–53, and the Boston Group of the Atlantic Reserve Fleet in 1954–56. McClusky retired from active duty in July 1956 as a captain but was advanced on the retired list to rear admiral. U.S. Navy policy at the time allowed officers who earned a combat award for heroism (his Navy Cross) to advance one rank upon retirement but without the increase in pay. This policy was unofficially known as a tombstone promotion with the thought being the individual would have that rank inscribed on his tombstone. The policy ended 1 November 1959. McClusky's tombstone at the United States Naval Academy cemetery has his rank inscribed as rear admiral.

The Buffalo and Erie County Naval and Military Park commissioned a bronze sculpture of McClusky. It stands in the museum.

== Awards and honors ==
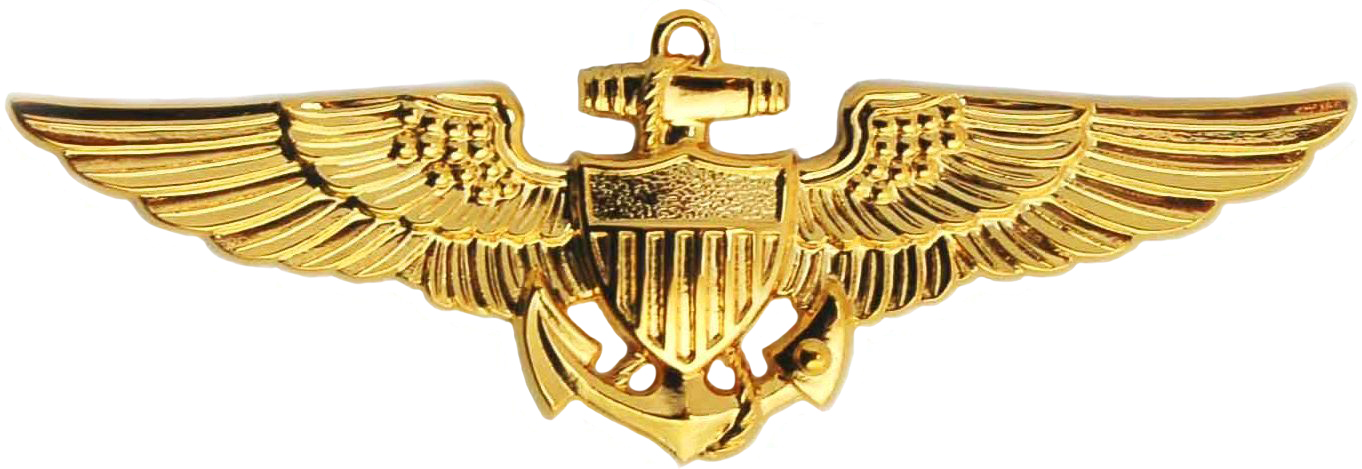

Naval Aviator Wings
Navy Cross		Legion of Merit
Distinguished Flying Cross	Purple Heart	Air Medal
Navy Commendation Medal	Navy and Marine Corps Presidential Unit Citation w/ 3/16" Bronze Star	China Service Medal
American Defense Service Medal w/ 3/16" Bronze Star	American Campaign Medal	Asiatic-Pacific Campaign Medal w/ 3/16" Silver and Bronze Stars
World War II Victory Medal	Navy Occupation Service Medal w/ 'Japan' clasp	National Defense Service Medal
Korean Service Medal	Republic of Korea Presidential Unit Citation	United Nations Korea Medal

=== Navy Cross citation ===

Lieutenant Commander Clarence Wade McClusky Jr.
U.S. Navy
Date Of Action: June 6, 1942

The President of the United States of America takes pleasure in presenting the Navy Cross to Lieutenant Commander Clarence Wade McClusky Jr., United States Navy, for extraordinary heroism in operations against the enemy while serving as Pilot of a carrier-based Navy Combat Plane and Air Group Commander of Enterprise Air Group, attached to the USS Enterprise (CV-6), during the Battle of Midway on 6 June 1942. On receipt of a report of an enemy Japanese invasion fleet in the area, Lieutenant Commander McClusky led his squadron of planes in a dogged and thorough search, continued until the objective was located, and attacked with boldness and determination four enemy carriers in complete disregard of heavy anti-aircraft fire and strong fighter opposition. Such severe damage was inflicted on the flight decks of the Japanese carriers that they were effectively put out of action. In this engagement, in which Lieutenant Commander McClusky suffered a shoulder wound from enemy shrapnel, his courage and inspiring leadership in the face of overwhelming opposition and great danger were in keeping with the highest traditions of the United States Naval Service.

=== Namesakes ===
USS McClusky (FFG-41) was named in his honor.

The Wade McClusky Award is given annually to the most outstanding attack squadron in the US Navy.

== Portrayal in media ==
- In the 1949 film Task Force, by Bruce Bennett.
- In the 1976 film Midway, by Christopher George.
- In the 1988 miniseries War and Remembrance, by Earl Hindman.
- In the 2019 film Midway, by Luke Evans.
