= Operation Sea Orbit =

Circumnavigation of the U.S. Navy's nuclear-powered TF1

- Part of the Cold War (1962–1979)
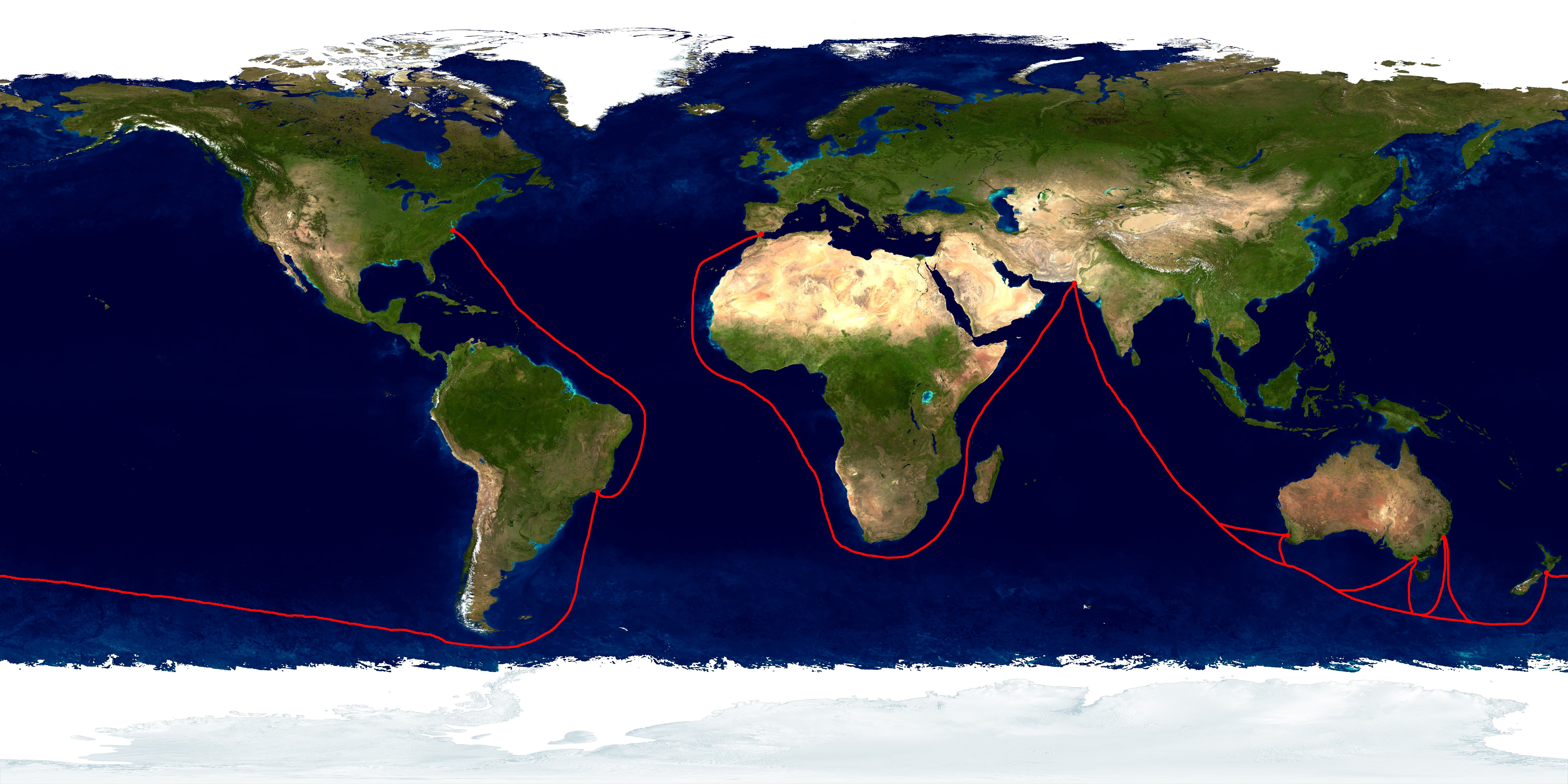
- Operation Sea Orbit route.
- Type: Naval surface warfare and naval air operations
- Location: World-wide
- Planned by: United States Navy
- Objective: First circumnavigation of the world by nuclear-powered surface warships
- Date: 31 July 1964 to 3 October 1964
- Executed by: Rear Admiral Bernard M. Strean, USN; Task Force One: • USS Enterprise (CVAN-65) • USS Long Beach (CGN-9) • USS Bainbridge (DLGN-25) • Carrier Air Wing Six (CVW-6)
- Outcome: Mission successfully accomplished.

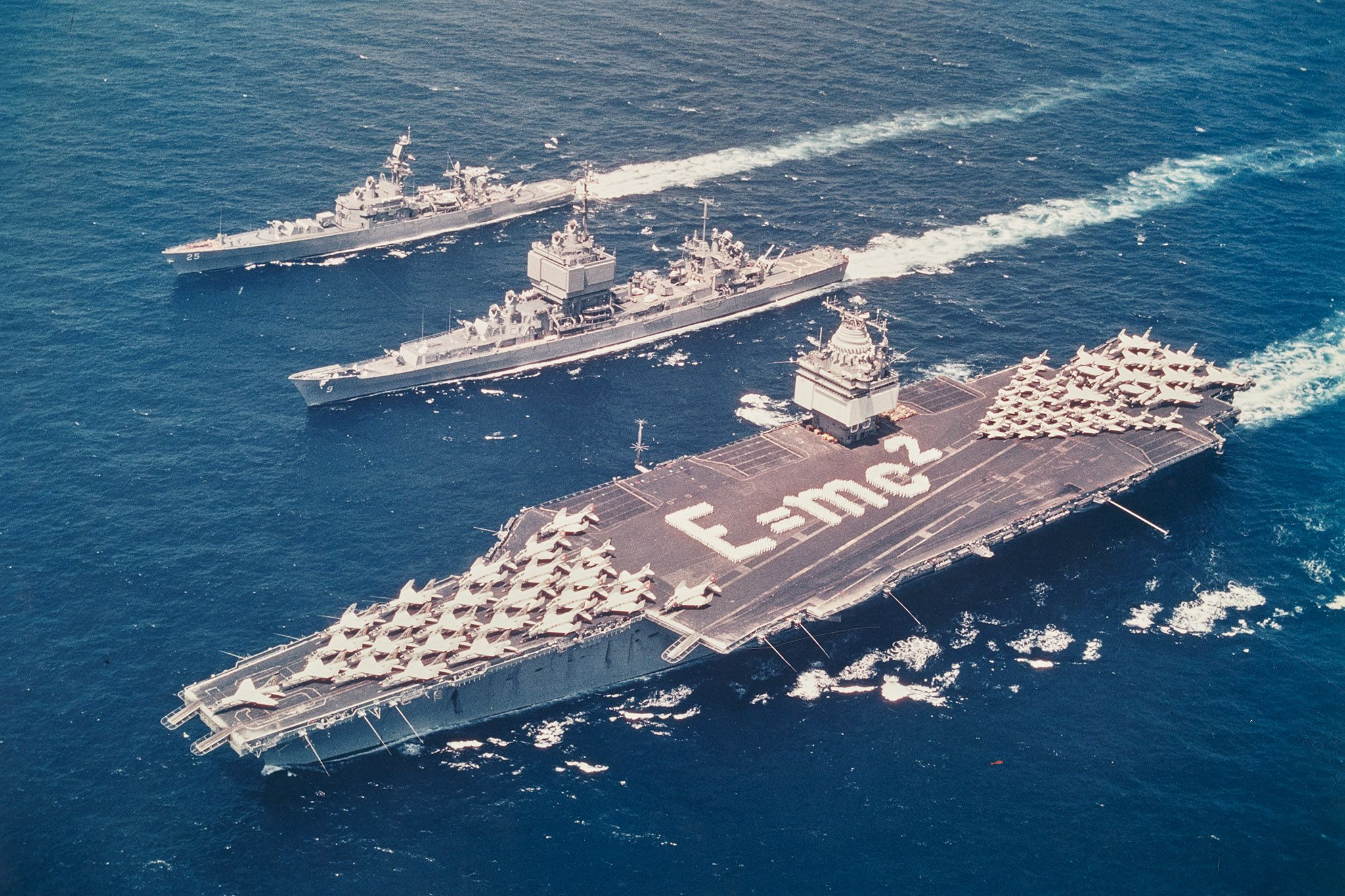
Enterprise, Long Beach, and Bainbridge underway in the Mediterranean

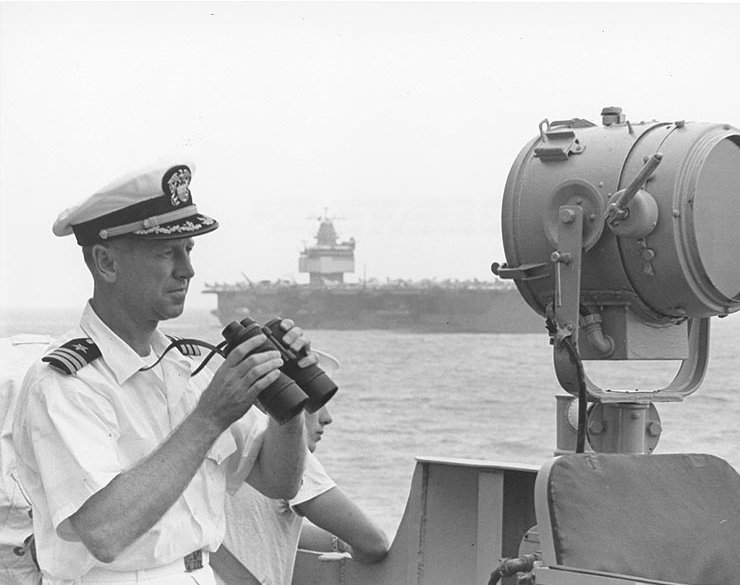
Commander William A. Spencer, the executive officer of the Bainbridge, scans the shoreline as Task Force One enters port at Karachi, Pakistan

Operation Sea Orbit was the 1964 circumnavigation of Task Force One of the United States Navy, consisting of the aircraft carrier USS Enterprise (CVAN-65) and her escorts, the cruisers USS Long Beach (CGN-9), and USS Bainbridge (DLGN-25). This all-nuclear-powered unit sailed 30,565 miles around the world for sixty-five days without refueling.

== Concept ==
Operation Sea Orbit was the idea of Vice Admiral John S. McCain, Jr., who saw the exercise – which demonstrated how nuclear-powered ships could operate unfettered by shore logistical ties – as a statement of American technical achievement similar to that of the coal-burning Great White Fleet in 1907–1909.

== Deployment ==
Long Beach and Bainbridge departed Norfolk on 28 April 1964, in company with the aircraft carrier Franklin D. Roosevelt for the Atlantic crossing to the Mediterranean, where the rendezvous with Enterprise was scheduled. Task Force 1 formed up at Bahia de Pollença, Mallorca on 13 May, before undertaking a series of exercises to test the efficiency of the all-nuclear formation working together.

Having been relieved by other vessels, TF1 departed on its trans-global cruise on 31 July 1964, with all three ships having taken aboard maximum provisions the day before to ensure there was no need for further underway replenishment en route. The task force initially sailed down the west coast of Africa, calling at Rabat, Dakar, Freetown, Monrovia and Abidjan, before crossing the equator. By 10 August, TF1 had reached the Cape of Good Hope, where it conducted exercises with a pair of South African Navy ships.

Following the South African visit, TF1 transited the Mozambique Channel into the Indian Ocean where the ships then called at Mombasa, before transiting the Indian Ocean to Pakistan, where they rendezvoused with three ships of the Pakistan Navy, before the entire force called at Karachi. However, due to the sea conditions it was determined to be too dangerous for either Enterprise or Long Beach to enter the port; instead, while Bainbridge came alongside, the two larger ships were forced to anchor several miles outside the harbour.

Upon departing from Karachi, TF1 transited along the west coast of India before turning towards Australia. While en route, in the area south of Indonesia, the force conducted an exercise with a Royal Navy carrier group led by HMS Victorious, before splitting to allow individual port calls at Fremantle (Bainbridge), Melbourne (Long Beach) and Sydney (Enterprise), before the three ships reformed for the transit to New Zealand, where both Bainbridge and Long Beach additionally called at Wellington.

TF1 crossed the South Pacific Ocean and rounded Cape Horn back into the Atlantic, with visits to Buenos Aires and Montevideo before the entire task force put in at Rio de Janeiro. Having departed Brazil, Bainbridge was detached on 30 September to return to Charleston, while Enterprise and Long Beach put in at Norfolk, all three arriving back on 3 October 1964.

Task Force One had spent 65 days deployed, with 57 of them at sea, and steamed 30,216 miles in total without replenishment. Rear Admiral Strean noted that the flexibility of operating a force of nuclear powered vessels meant that TF1 "could have been diverted to any other maritime area of the world without logistical considerations and could have been ready for immediate operations upon arrival".

=== Command ===
- Commander, Task Force One: Rear Admiral Bernard M. Strean (Commander Carrier Division 2)
  - USS Enterprise: Captain Frederick H. Michaelis
    - Carrier Air Wing Six: Commander T.L. Nielsen
  - USS Long Beach: Captain Frank H. Price, Jr.
  - USS Bainbridge: Captain Hal C. Castle

== Commemorations ==
Veterans of Operation Sea Orbit gathered on July 30, 2004, for a 40th anniversary reunion. In 2011, Operation Sea Orbit was included in the Technology for the Nuclear Age: Nuclear Propulsion display for the Cold War exhibit at the U.S. Navy Museum in Washington, DC.

== See also ==
- Operation Sandblast
- Great White Fleet
- Nuclear powered cruisers of the United States Navy
- 1966 Soviet submarine global circumnavigation
