= Carrier Air Group Six =

- Active: 15 March 1943 – 29 October 1945
- Country: United States
- Branch: United States Navy
- Type: Carrier air wing
- Engagements: World War II • Operation Galvanic • Operation Flintlock • Operation Hailstone • Operation Iceberg

The first Carrier Air Group to use the designation Carrier Air Group Six was established on 15 March 1943. It was constituted from the squadrons of the Enterprise Air Group which had been disestablished on 1 September 1942 and was initially assigned to USS Enterprise (CV-6). Due to the manner in which the United States Navy determines unit lineage, in which a unit's lineage begins at establishment and ends at disestablishment, the Enterprise Air Group and Carrier Air Group Six are two separate and distinct units and do not share a lineage.

== Operations during WWII ==
World War II operations by Carrier Air Group Six
Period	Aircraft carrier	Operations	Squadrons			
Period	Aircraft carrier	Operations	Fighter	Bomber	Torpedo	Scout
10 November 1943 – 9 December 1943	USS Enterprise (CV-6) (Task Force 50)	Battle of Tarawa	VF-6	VB-6	VT-6	
December 1943 – 22 March 1944	USS Intrepid (CV-11) (Task Force 58)	Gilbert and Marshall Islands campaign (Operation Flintlock), Operation Hailstone	VF-6; VF(N)-78	VB-6	VT-6	
9 March 1945 – 11 April 1945	USS Hancock (CV-19) (Task Force 58)	Battle of Okinawa (Operation Iceberg)				
13 June 1945 – 20 June 1945	USS Hancock (CV-19) (COMAIRPAC)	Wake Island				
1 July 1945 – 15 August 1945	USS Hancock (CV-19) (Task Force 38)	air raids on Japan				

While flying off Enterprise, the air group provided close air support to the amphibious landing on Makin Atoll from 19 to 21 November 1943. On the night of 26 November, carrier-based night fighters from Enterprise broke up a large group of land-based bombers attacking Task Group 50.2. After a heavy strike by aircraft of Task Force 50 against Kwajalein on 4 December, Enterprise returned to Pearl Harbor on 9 December.

Carrier Air Group Six then embarked on board the new Essex-class aircraft carrier USS Intrepid (CV-11) to provide air support for the amphibious landings on Kwajalein Atoll from 31 January to 3 February 1944. They also participated in a massive air strike against the Japanese naval base at Truk. The air group destroyed fifty-five enemy planes (twelve in the air and forty-two on the ground) as well as sinking five Japanese ships. Nine planes were lost, with nine pilots and four crewmen dead or missing.

On 9 March 1945, Carrier Air Group Six switched to the new Essex-class aircraft carrier USS Hancock (CV-19) and carried out air strikes against Kyūshū airfields, southwestern Honshu, and shipping in the Inland Sea of Japan on 18 March. From 23 to 27 March, they struck the Nansei-shoto islands. Their last strikes in March came on the 31st, when they hit Minami Daito Jima and Kyūshū.

Carrier Air Group Six subsequently provided air support for the U.S. invasion of Okinawa beginning on 1 April until a suicide plane hit the Hancock on 7 April. This forced the carrier off the battle line for repairs. Hancock and Air Group Six returned to action on 13 June and remained at sea until the end of World War II. Carrier Air Group Six was disestablished on 29 October 1945.

== Second carrier air group to be designated Carrier Air Group Six ==
On 1 September 1948 CVBG-5 (which had been established as CVG-17 during WWII) was redesignated Carrier Air Group Six (CVG-6). This air group was eventually redesignated Carrier Air Wing Six.
