= VAW-122 =

Carrier Airborne Early Warning Squadron 122
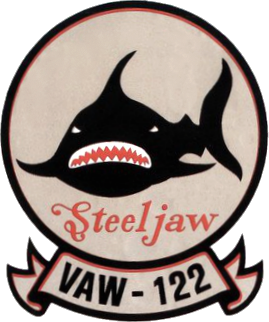
- VAW-122 Insignia
- Active: 1 April 1967 – 31 March 1996
- Country: United States
- Branch: United States Navy
- Type: Airborne Early Warning
- Part of: Carrier Air Wing 6
- Nicknames: "Steeljaws", "Hummer Gator"
- Engagements: USS Liberty incident Vietnam War; Operation Urgent Fury; Operation Provide Comfort

Carrier Airborne Early Warning Squadron 122 (VAW-122) was an aviation unit of the United States Navy in service from 1 April 1967 to 31 March 1996. Originally nicknamed the "Hummer Gators" and later as "Steeljaws" was a U.S. Atlantic Coast Carrier Airborne Early Warning Squadron stationed at NAS Norfolk. During its 30 years of existence, the squadron was deployed around the world and saw action from Vietnam to Desert Storm, conducting operations from the Arctic to the tropics.

== Squadron History ==
=== 1960s ===
Originally equipped with the E-2A Hawkeye, VAW-122 was first on the scene, establishing communications and directing fighter coverage for the USS Liberty in the Mediterranean in June 1967 after the intelligence-gathering ship was attacked by Israeli aircraft and torpedo boats. During a 1968 deployment on board the USS America off Vietnam, VAW-122 crews assisted a VF-33 F-4 Phantom crew in downing a North Vietnamese MiG-21 fighter as well as controlling interdiction strikes against North Vietnam.

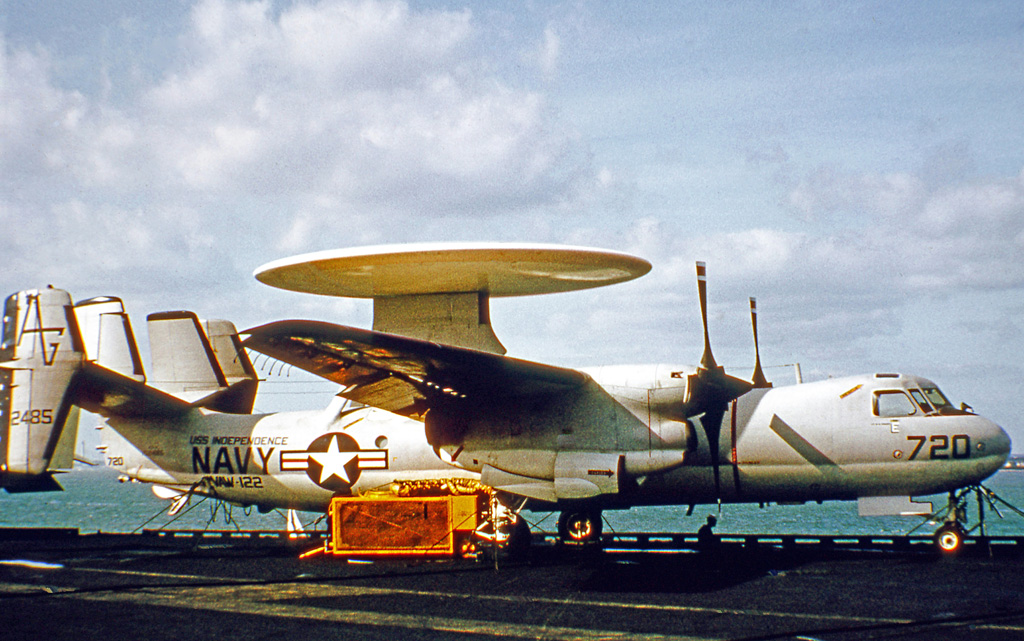
An E-2A Hawkeye of VAW-122 aboard Independence in September 1969.

=== 1970s ===
After a 1970 deployment to the Mediterranean during the Jordanian crisis with CVW-7 on board the USS Independence, VAW-122 upgraded to the somewhat more capable E-2B. The squadron's next two deployments to the Mediterranean returned its crews to international crises—the 1973 Yom Kippur War and the 1974 Cyprus Crisis.

In April 1975, VAW-122 upgraded to the definitive E-2C Hawkeye. In 1978, the squadron rejoined after a Pacific deployment embarked in USS Kitty Hawk with CVW-6 and over the next 13 years deployed to the Arabian Sea, Mediterranean, and North Atlantic on board the Independence and the USS Forrestal.

=== 1980s ===
In 1982 VAW 122 deployed on board USS Independence and provided support to operations in Beirut, Lebanon. During the 1983 deployment, VAW-122 supported combat operations in Grenada and Lebanon, then on its last combat carrier deployment in 1991, supported Operation Provide Comfort over Iraq during and subsequent to Operation Desert Storm. Throughout its operational lifetime, VAW-122 participated in numerous cold-war, North Atlantic, Mediterranean, African, Indian Ocean, Eastern European, and Middle Eastern operations, supported several NASA Space Shuttle launches, and devised a variety of original operational tactics and procedures including ABCCC missions.

=== 1990s ===
VAW-122 made its first major counter-narcotic deployment as a squadron to the Caribbean and Central America in 1990, previously it had been smaller detachments of shorter duration beginning in 1983 with Operation Thunderbolt. In 1992 became permanently assigned to the role of counter-narcotic. By 1996, the unit had completed eight deployments in the Caribbean and Eastern Pacific areas, conducting some missions deep over South or Central America, and far into the Pacific Ocean—and was credited with the seizure of more than 16 metric tons of illegal drugs.

VAW-122 was disestablished at NAS Norfolk on 31 March 1996. Its drug-interdiction mission and aircraft were assumed by VAW-77, stationed at NAS Atlanta.

== Deployments ==
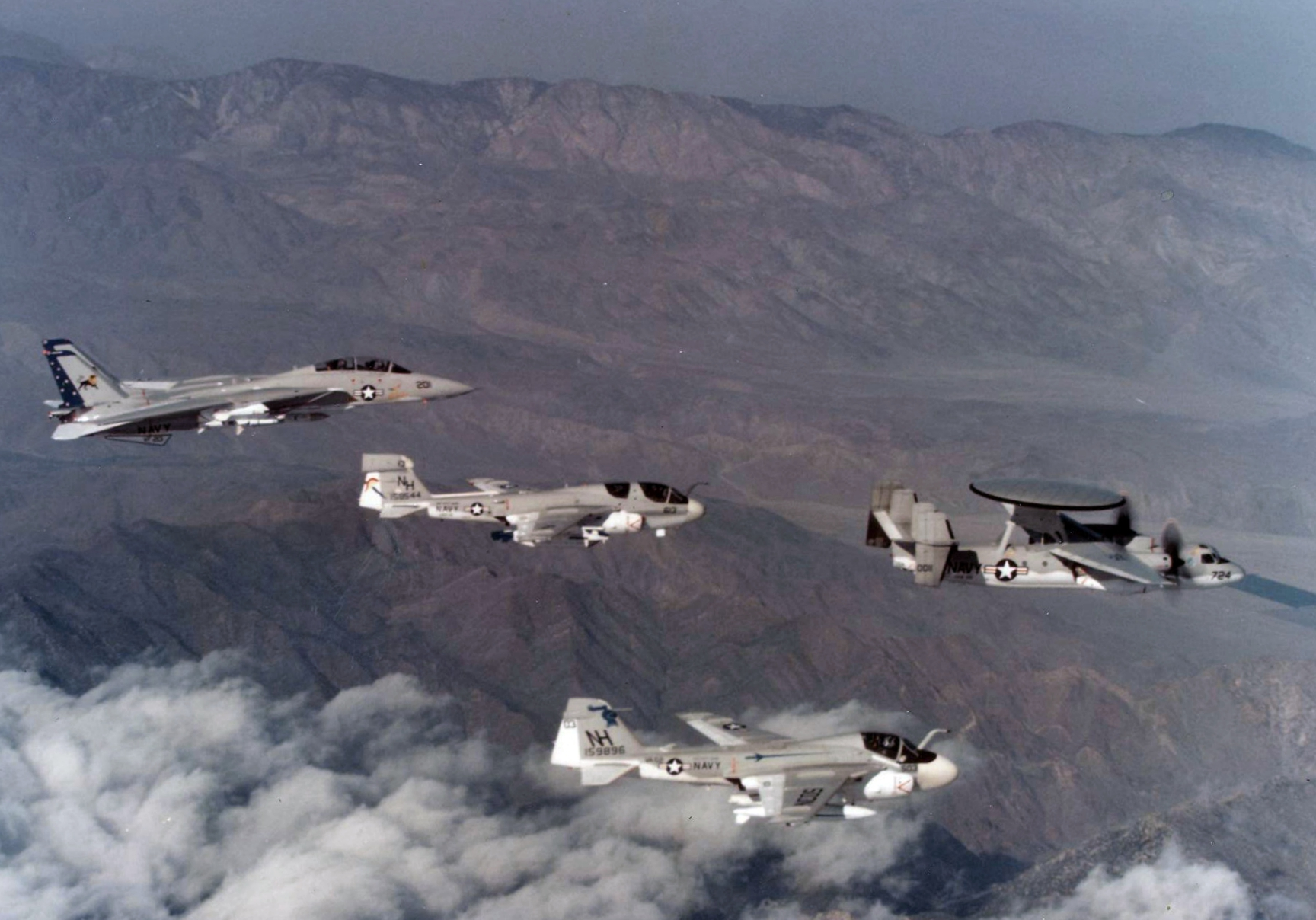
A VAW-122 E-2C Hawkeye with CVW-11 aircraft in 1977.

Deployments of the squadron

Group	Dates		Location
USS America	1 April 1967	20 September 1967	MED (Note: Commissioned while deployed)
USS America	10 April 1968	16 December 1968	Vietnam
USS Independence	8 July 1970	1 February 1971	MED
USS Independence	16 September 1971	15 March 1972	MED
USS Independence	21 June 1973	19 January 1974	MED
USS Independence	19 July 1974	31 January 1975	MED
USS Kitty Hawk	25 October 1977	May 1978	WESTPAC
USS Independence	24 June 1979	14 December 1979	MED
USS Independence	19 November 1980	10 June 1981	IO
USS Independence	7 June 1982	21 December 1982	MED
USS Independence	18 October 1983	11 April 1984	MED/N. ATLANTIC (Note: Includes Operation Urgent Fury (Grenada))
USS Independence	16 October 1984	19 February 1985	IO
USS Forrestal	2 June 1986	10 November 1986	MED
USS Forrestal	April 1988	September 1988	MED
USS Forrestal	4 November 1989	13 April 1990	MED
CTG 4.1 OPS	27 August 1990	25 October 1990	Panama
USS Forrestal	31 May 1991	21 December 1991	MED (Note: Includes Operation Provide Comfort (Iraq))
CJTF-4 OPS	11 November 1992	28 December 1992	Panama
CJTF-4 OPS	7 April 1993	14 May 1993	Panama
CJTF-4 OPS	19 August 1993	11 October 1993	GTMO
CJTF-4 OPS	3 March 1994	3 August 1994	GTMO/PR
DIRJIATFE OPS	14 November 1994	23 December 1994	NSRR, PR
DIRJIATFE OPS	9 May 1995	1 July 1995	NSRR, PR
SOUTHCOM OPS	10 October 1995	30 November 1995	CURACAO
DIRJIATFE OPS	1 December 1995	20 December 1995	NSRR, PR

== See also ==
- History of the United States Navy
- List of inactive United States Navy aircraft squadrons
- List of United States Navy aircraft squadrons
