= VA-42 (U.S. Navy) =

Attack Squadron 42
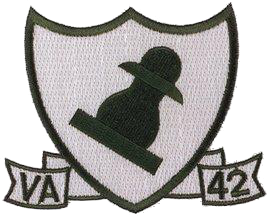
- VA-42 Insignia
- Active: 1 September 1950 – 30 September 1994
- Country: United States of America
- Branch: United States Navy
- Type: Attack
- Role: Close air support Air interdiction Fleet Replacement Squadron
- Garrison/HQ: NAS Oceana
- Nicknames: Green Pawns; Thunderbolts

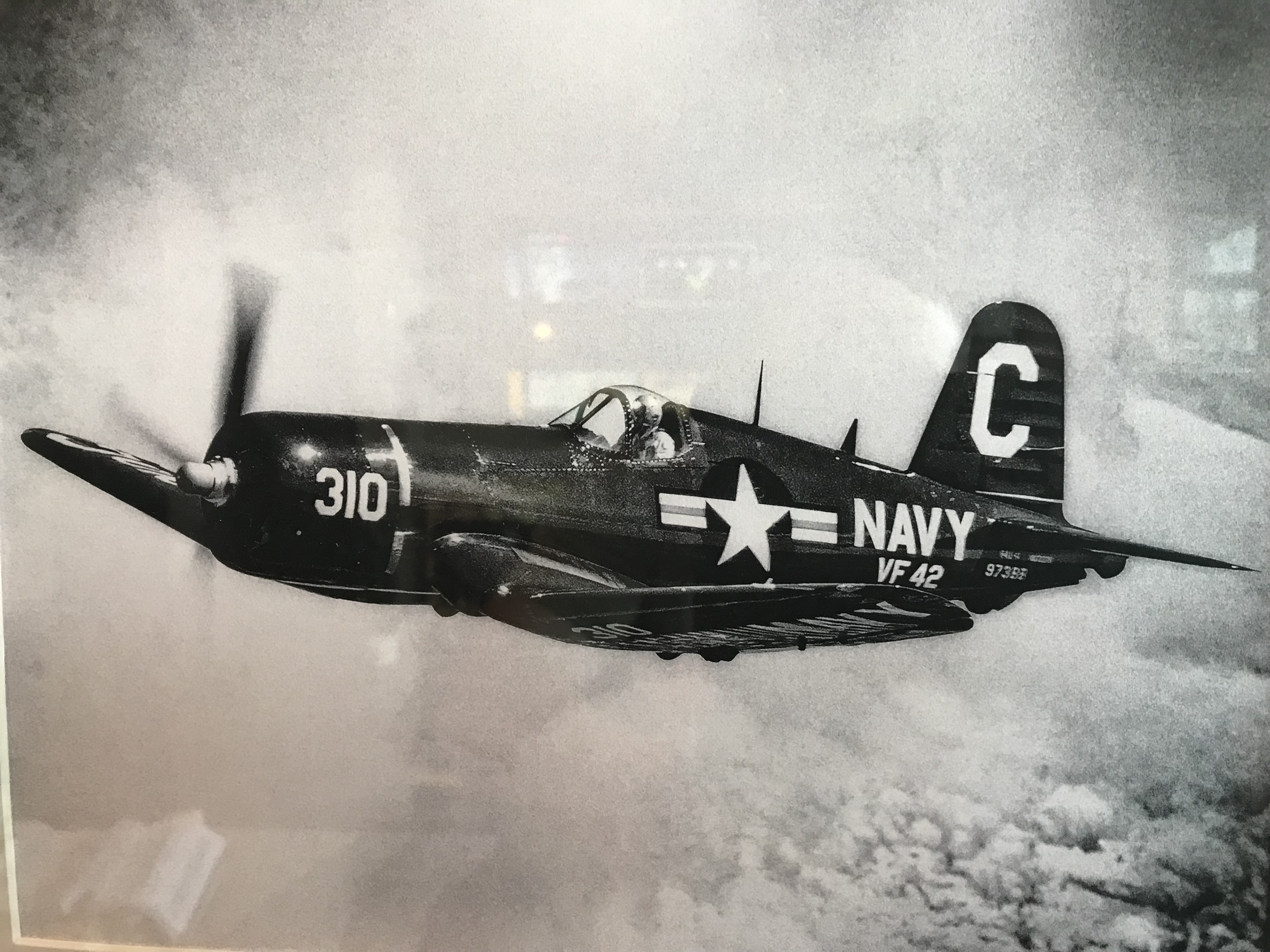
F4U Corsair of VF-42 circa 1950

Attack Squadron 42 (VA-42) was a United States Navy attack squadron based at Naval Air Station Oceana, Virginia. The squadron was established as Fighter Squadron 42 (VF-42) on 1 September 1950, redesignated as VA-42 on 1 November 1953 and disestablished on 30 September 1994.

== History ==
=== "Green Pawn" nickname ===
The insignia for VA-42, the "Green Pawn", was originally approved by the Chief of Naval Operations (CNO) for Bombing and Fighting Squadron 75 (VBF-75) on 28 October 1946. When VBF-75 was redesignated Fighting Squadron 4B (VF-4B) on 15 November 1946, the insignia was carried over for use by VF-4B. On 1 September 1948 VF-4B was redesignated Fighting Squadron 42 (VF-42). This squadron continued to use the Green Pawn insignia until it was disestablished on 8 June 1950. When a new Fighting Squadron 42 (VF-42) was established on 1 September 1950 they adopted the Green Pawn insignia that had been used by the former VF-42. In 1953 the insignia was carried over to VA-42 following its redesignation from VF-42.

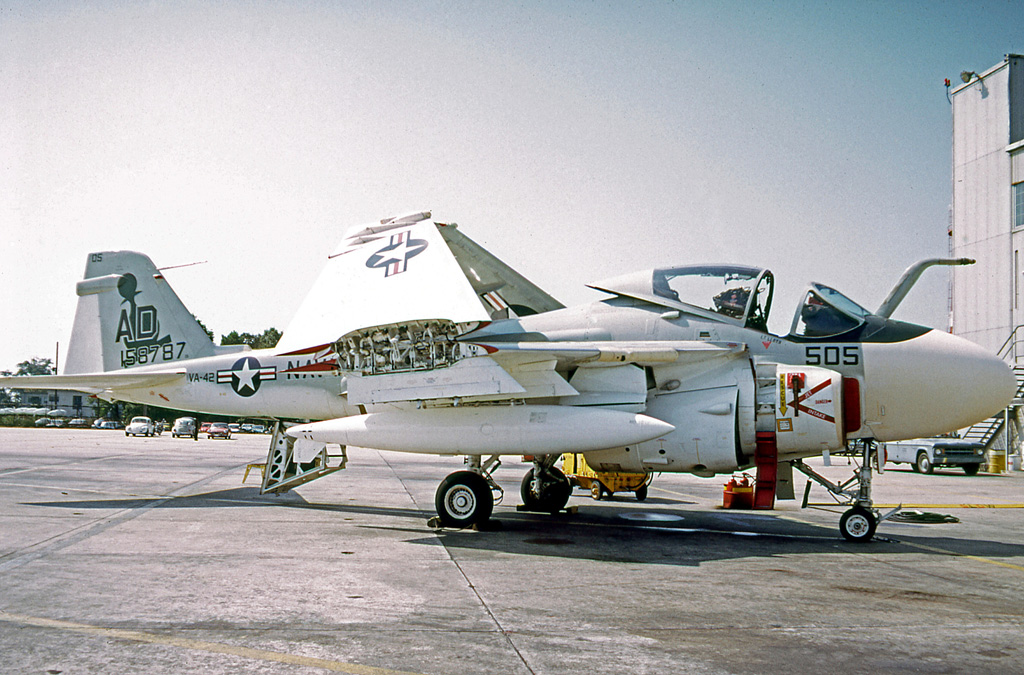
Grumman A-6E Intruder of VA-42 in 1973 wearing the Green Pawns symbol on its fin

The Green Pawn insignia is a simple, uncluttered and highly recognizable design. The symbol of the pawn was chosen because it has the most potential power of any piece on the chess board. The pawn is canted at a 45 degree angle inside a shield design. It is also said that the aircrews said they were called the Green Pawns for two reasons: it was the Fleet Replacement Squadron (responsible for training new aircrew and aircraft maintainers; thereby, they were green, or new); and their squadron was a pawn which could be pushed around by the fleet and the senior commands. Colors are as follows: green pawn; background of the shield is white outlined in green; and the scroll is white outlined in green with green lettering.

=== "Thunderbolts" nickname ===
In 1992 the name and insignia was changed to "Thunderbolts" from the then recently disestablished A-6 fleet squadron, VA-176. On the insignia was a dark blue background, a maced fist and lightning bolt held by the fist. The stars in the background, still were shown in the count of 1, 7, and 6 [these were separated by the parts of the insignia].

== Chronology of significant events ==
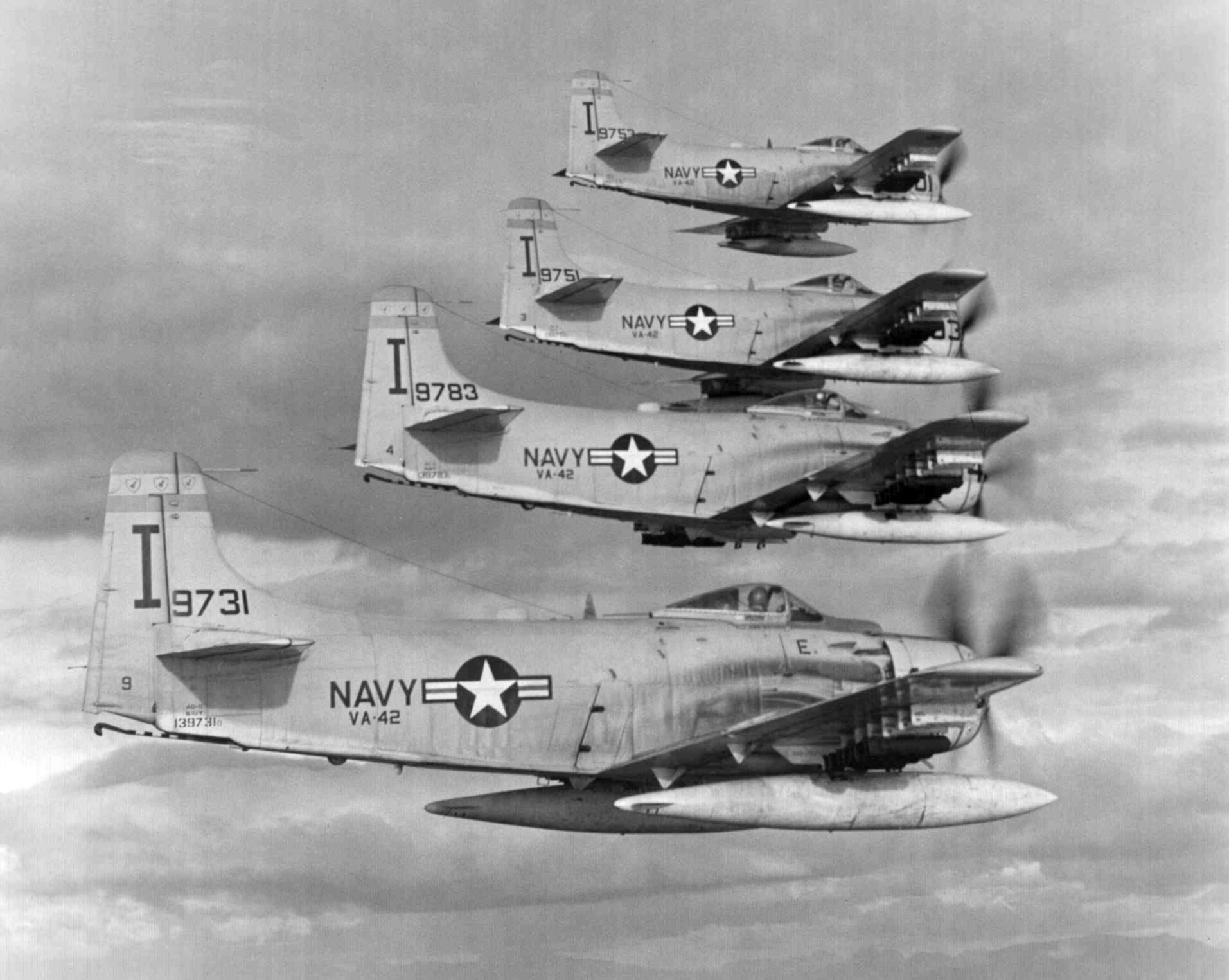
Four of VF-42's Skyraiders in 1955

- 20 October – 15 November 1951: During training operations in the Caribbean, the squadron operated aboard three different carriers. They departed from Norfolk, Virginia aboard USS Midway and then transferred to USS Wright while the ships were off the coast of Puerto Rico. A couple of days later the squadron was transferred to USS Cabot while operating at sea.
- January–April 1956: The squadron operated aboard the Navy's first super carrier, USS Forrestal, during her shakedown cruise.
- October 1956 The Squadron Flew from Oceana, VA to San Diego, CA to join the USS Bennington CVA-20 to test how fast a CAG could be re-positioned from the East Coast to the West Coast. The squadron was deployed aboard the Bennington for nine months. Visiting Hawaii, Japan, the Philippines, Australia and crossing the Equator at the International date line. Thus making the Crew and Air Group Golden Shellbacks. The ship returned to Hawaii then to San Diego, May 1957. The Squadron returned to Oceana Naval Air Station.
- 24 October 1958: The primary mission of VA-42 was changed to the training of fleet replacement pilots in the AD Skyraider. The training involved all-weather flight training, low-level navigation flights, simulated special (i.e., nuclear) weapons training flights, conventional weapons training flights, and day and night carrier qualifications.
- 19 February 1959: VA-42 graduated its first AD Skyraider replacement pilot.
- 9 March 1959: With the acquisition of the T-28B aircraft, VA-42's instrument instructors used this plane to conduct all-weather flight training for the light attack community.
- 10 November 1962: VA-42 pilots flew three A-1H Skyraiders from NAS Argentia, Newfoundland, to Naval Station Rota, Spain, via Lajes Field, Azores. The squadron claims this was the first trans-Atlantic flight conducted by A-1H Skyraiders.
- 1 February 1963: VA-42 became the first fleet squadron to receive the A-6A Intruder. The squadron also initiated the Fleet Introduction Program for the all-weather A-6A. VA-42's new mission was the training of A-6A Bombardier/Navigators, also known as B/N's, as well as its pilots. It was also responsible for conducting the A-6A Fleet Replacement Aviation Maintenance Program which trained maintenance personnel.
- 12 June 1963: VA-42 received the first A-6A (bureau number 149939) with a complete weapon system, thereby permitting the initiation of weapon system indoctrination flight training program for VA-42's instructor pilots and bombardier/navigators.
- 3 September 1963: Formal flight training in the A-6A fleet replacement program began with the convening of Class 1-63. This training was for VA-75 pilots and bombardier/navigators.
- 8 September 1963: The squadron's last A-1H Skyraider (bureau number 135324) was transferred. This brought to a close the training of A-1 replacement pilots by VA 42. VA-42 still maintained one A-1E and two T-28Bs for use in propeller instrument training.
- 14 October 1963: The squadron conducted the first fleet night arrested landings and catapult launchings with the A-6A aboard the USS Forrestal.
- 12 March 1964: The squadron's last T-28B was transferred, and the instrument training program for fleet A-1 pilots came to an end. Two days later, their last Skyraider, an A-1E, was transferred.

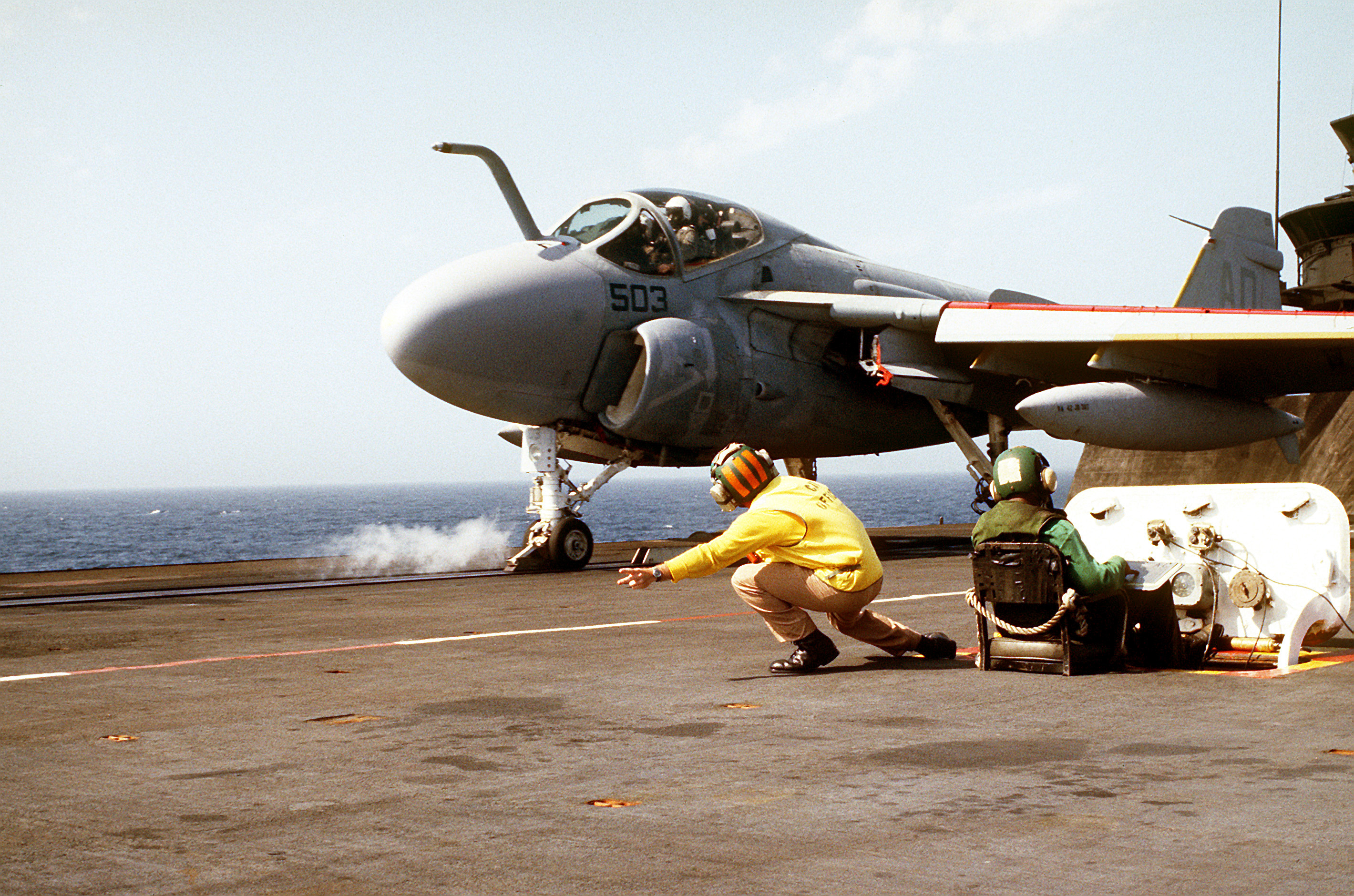
One of VA-42's A-6Es shortly before being launched from USS Lexington in 1984

- 13 March 1964: VA-75 became the first fully trained fleet A-6A squadron ready for deployment following successful completion of VA-42's fleet introduction program on the A-6A.
- 15 December 1964: VMA-242 became the first Marine Corps squadron to complete transition training in the A-6A and qualify for fleet deployment with the Intruder.
- 28 January 1968: With the acquisition of the TC-4C aircraft, VA-42 was able to provide more training on airborne radar operation for A-6A bombardier/navigators. The new aircraft was equipped with a complete A-6A cockpit console and weapon system, multiple bombardier/navigator stations, plus ECM equipment, and other radar operational capabilities.
- November 1968: VA-42's A-6A pilot training syllabus was modified to include lessons learned from the Intruder's employment in combat. The new tactics phase included air combat maneuvering and AIM-9 Sidewinder missile shoots, while conventional weapons training was made more realistic.
- 12 November 1969: With the acquisition of the updated Intruder, the A-6B, in June 1969, the squadron developed a new training syllabus for the A-6B Standard ARM aircraft and a detachment from VA-165 became the first to complete this course of instruction on 12 November 1969.
- 21 November 1969: The squadron assumed the duties of providing A-6 orientation training for Air Intelligence Officers reporting to fleet A-6 squadrons. Lieutenant(jg) Erickson became the first Air Intelligence Officer to complete the training on 21 November 1969.
- 1 October 1971: When COMMATWING ONE was established on 1 October, VA-42 was reassigned from COMFAIRNORFOLK to this command, and VA-42's Commanding Officer, CDR Andrassy, was also assigned as Commander of Medium Attack Wing One, making him dual-hatted.
- 5 January 1973: VA-42's Commanding Officer, CDR Zick, was relieved of his duties as COMMATWING ONE by CAPT Turk ending the dual-hatted role of the squadron's commanding officer.
- 1980: Lieutenant (jg) Beth Hubert was trained as an A-6 Intruder pilot by VA-42 and became the first woman naval aviator to qualify as an A-6 pilot.
- January 1982: VA-42 implemented a training program for the Harpoon missile system.
- June 1982: A VA-42 pilot became the first female naval aviator to make an arrested landing in an A-6 during carrier qualifications on USS Lexington.
- 19 October 1992: Name and insignia officially changed to "Thunderbolts" and old insignia of VA-176.
- 30 September 1994: officially disestablished.

== Assignments ==
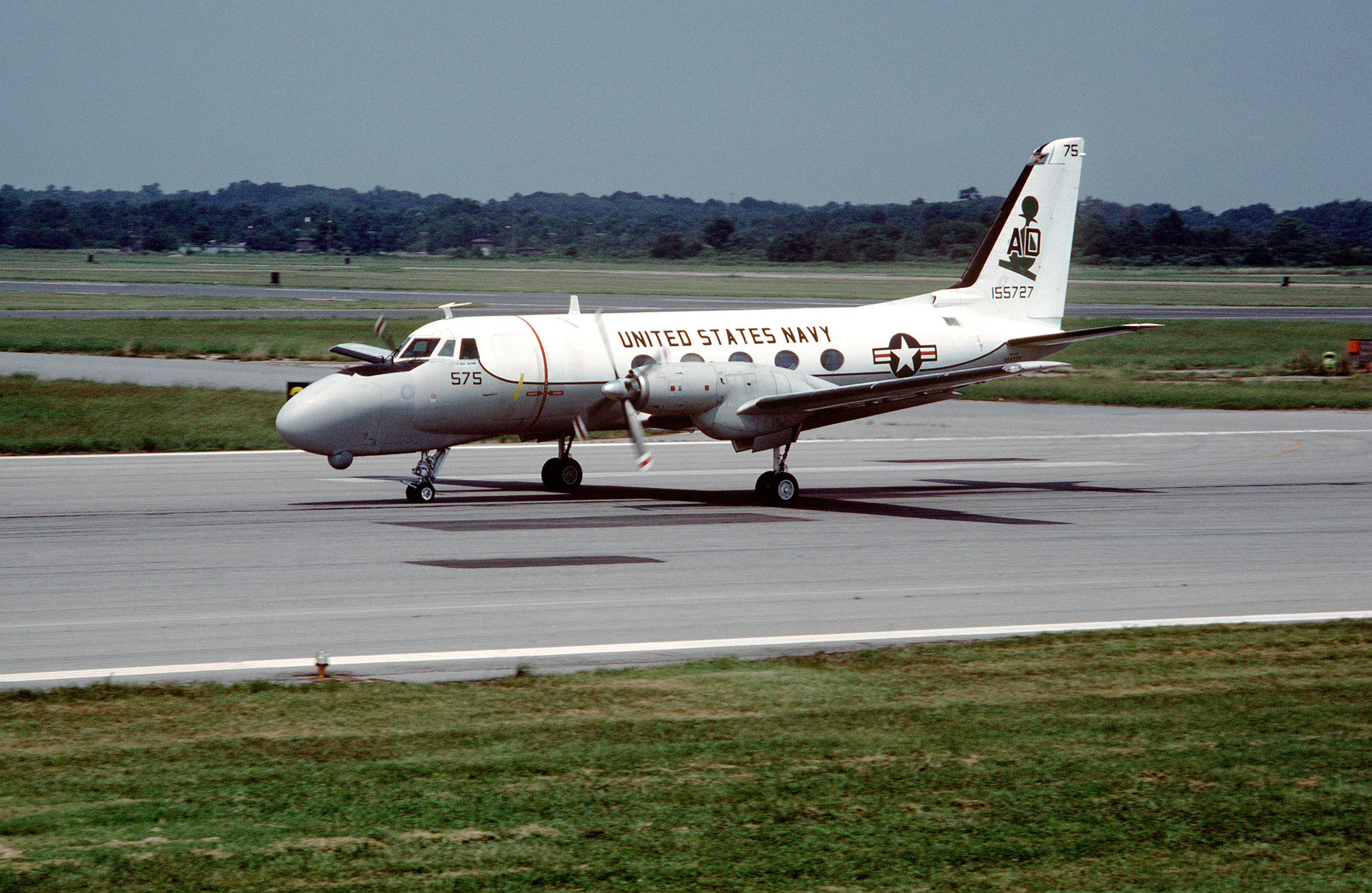
A VF-42 TC-4C Academe aircraft in 1989

Home ports

Location Assignment Date

- NAAS Oceana: 1 September 1950
- NAS Jacksonville: 19 September 1950
- NAAS Cecil Field: 9 June 1951
- NAAS Oceana (later NAS*) 27 August 1951 NAAS Oceana redesignated NAS Oceana on 1 April 1952.
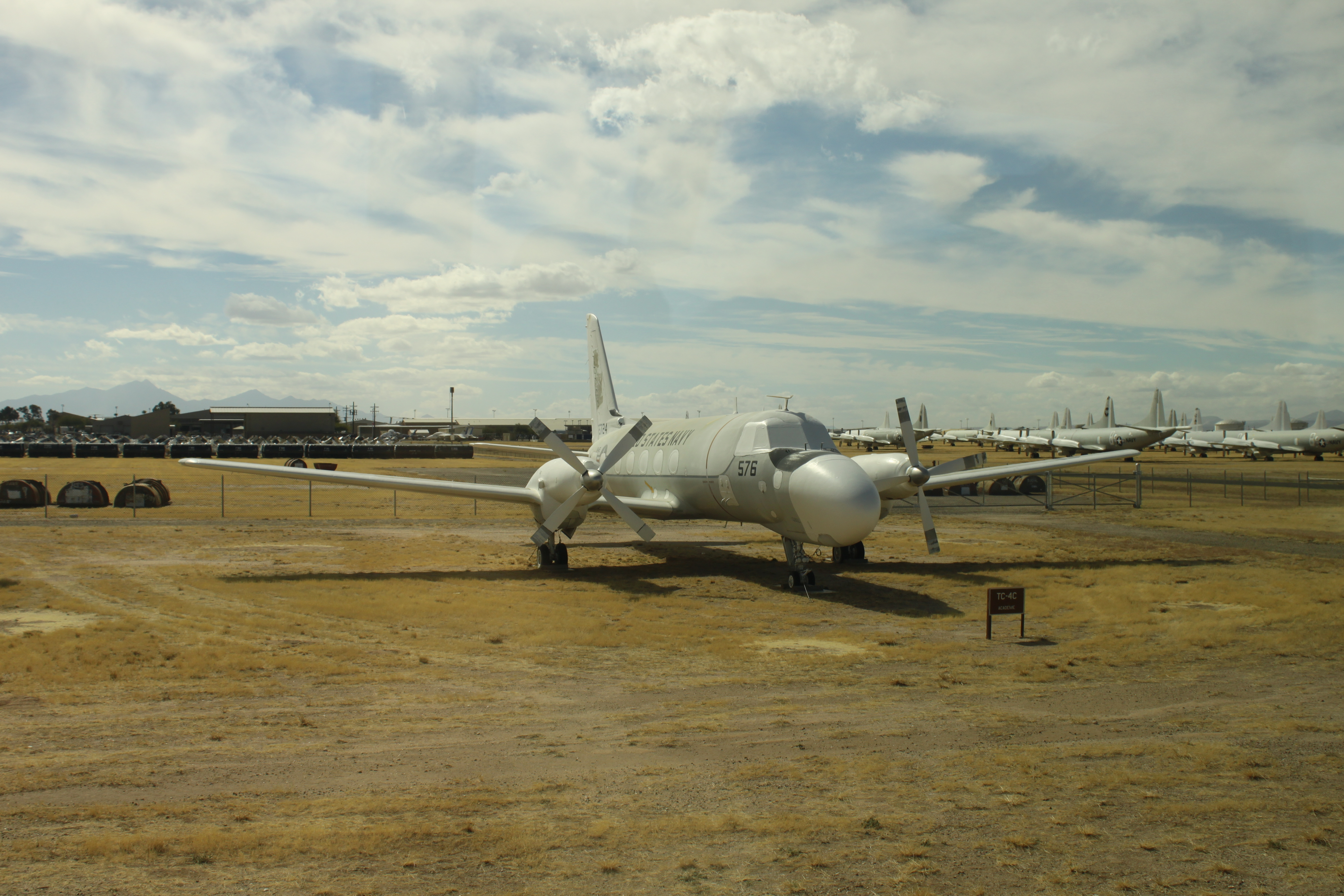
  TC-4C aircraft used by VA-42 at Davis-Monthan in 2018.

Aircraft

Type of Aircraft Date Type First Received

- F4U: 4 September 1950
- AD: 4 September 1953
- AD-4L: October 1953
- AD: 6 November 1953
- AD-4N: December 1953
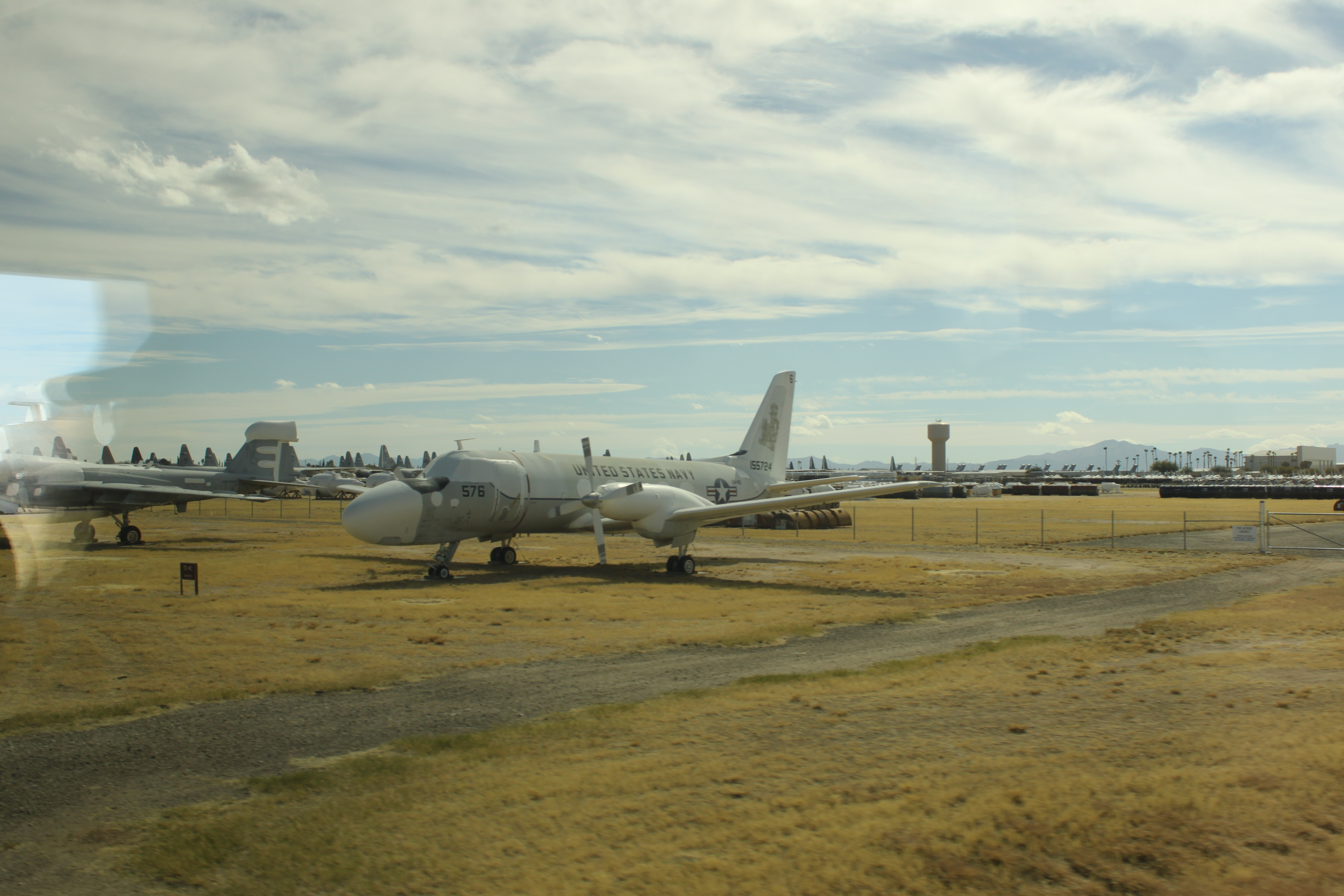
  TC-4C aircraft used by VA-42 at Davis-Monthan in 2018
- T-28B: 9 March 1959
- A-6A: 1 February 1963
- TC-4C: 28 January 1968
- A-6B: June 1969
- A-6C: 1971
- A-6E: 2 December 1971
- KA-6D: 1976

== Major overseas deployments ==
Depart Return Airwing Aircraft Area of Ops

- 6 March 1951 – 8 June 1951 AirDet CVL 48 F4U-4 Med
- 1 December 1952 – 19 May 1953 CVG-6 CVA 41 F4U-4 Med
- 30 November 1954 – 18 June 1955 ATG-181 CVA 15 AD-6 Med
- 12 October 1956 – 22 May 1957 ATG-181 CVA 20 AD-6 WestPac
- 9 June 1958 – 8 August 1958 ATG-181 CVA 11 AD-6 NorLant

== Air Wing assignments ==
Air Wing Tail Code Date

- CVG-6 C 1 September 1950
- ATG-181* I 24 July 1956
- CVG-8 AJ 14 August 1958
- RCVG-4† AD 24 October 1958
- COMFAIRNORFOLK‡ AD 1 May 1970
- COMMATWING ONE AD 1 October 1971
- VA-42 had operated as part of ATG-181 prior to July 1956.

However, ATG-181 was not assigned a tail code letter until 24 July 1956. Prior to July 1956 VA-42 still carried the tail code for CVG-6 even though it deployed as part of ATG-181. † RCVG-4 redesignated RCVW-4 on 20 December 1963. ‡ On 1 June 1970, RCVW-4 was disestablished. The AD tail code that had been allocated to RCVW-4 and its assigned squadrons continued to be used by the squadrons that had been in RCVW-4. VA-42 continued to use the AD tail code for its aircraft.

== Unit awards ==
MUC Meritorious Unit Commendation

Inclusive Dates Covering Award

- January 1979 – December 1981
- 1 October 1986 – 30 September 1988

== See also ==
- History of the United States Navy
- List of inactive United States Navy aircraft squadrons
- List of United States Navy aircraft squadrons
