= VA-176 (U.S. Navy) =

Attack Squadron 176
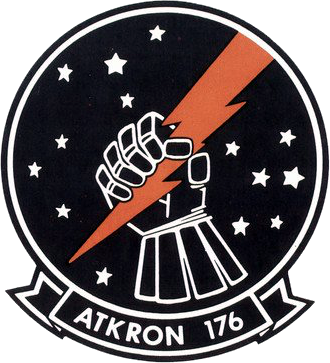
- VA-176 Insignia
- Active: 1 June 1955 – 30 October 1992
- Country: United States
- Branch: United States Navy
- Type: Attack
- Role: Close air support Air interdiction Aerial reconnaissance
- Part of: Inactive
- Garrison/HQ: Naval Air Station Oceana
- Nickname: "Thunderbolts"
- Engagements: Vietnam War; Operation Urgent Fury; Multinational Force in Lebanon; Operation Provide Comfort

Attack Squadron 176 (VA-176), known as the "Thunderbolts", was a United States Navy carrier-based medium attack squadron that saw combat service in the Vietnam War and later in 1983 in both Grenada and Lebanon.

== History ==
VA-176 was established on 4 June 1955 and equipped with the Douglas AD-6 Skyraider and assigned to the Atlantic Fleet. A year later the first deployment followed on board the aircraft carrier USS Randolph (CVA-15) to the Mediterranean Sea as part of Air Task Group 2 (ATG-2). In 1958, the squadron was assigned to Carrier Air Group 17 (CVG-17), but was not deployed as CVG-17 was disbanded. The next cruise in 1959/60 was aboard the USS Essex as part of CVG-10. In November and December 1960 VA-176 was assigned to Carrier Anti-submarine Air Group 52 (CVSG-52) aboard the USS Wasp. After this short deployment VA-176 returned to CVW-10 and made three deployments to the Mediterranean Sea with the USS Shangri-La between 1961 and 1965.

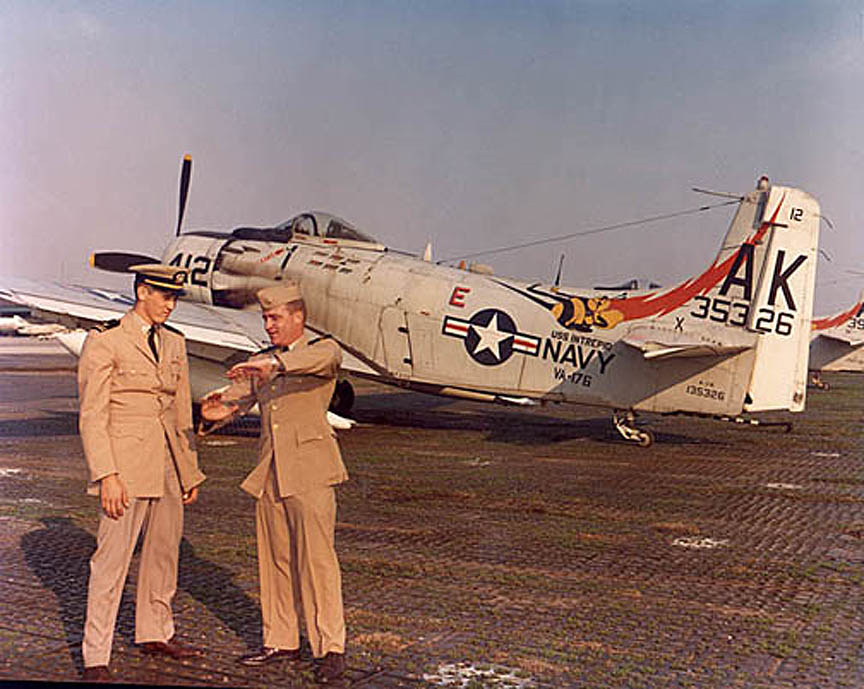
VA-176 A-1H in 1966 with "MiG-Killer" LTJG W. T. Patton

CVW-10 was shifted in 1966 to the USS Intrepid, which was used as an attack carrier for three deployments to Vietnam. During the 1966 deployment two members of the squadron became known by successfully engaging a Vietnam People's Air Force MiG-17, an unusual instance of propeller-driven aircraft defeating a jet-powered adversary.

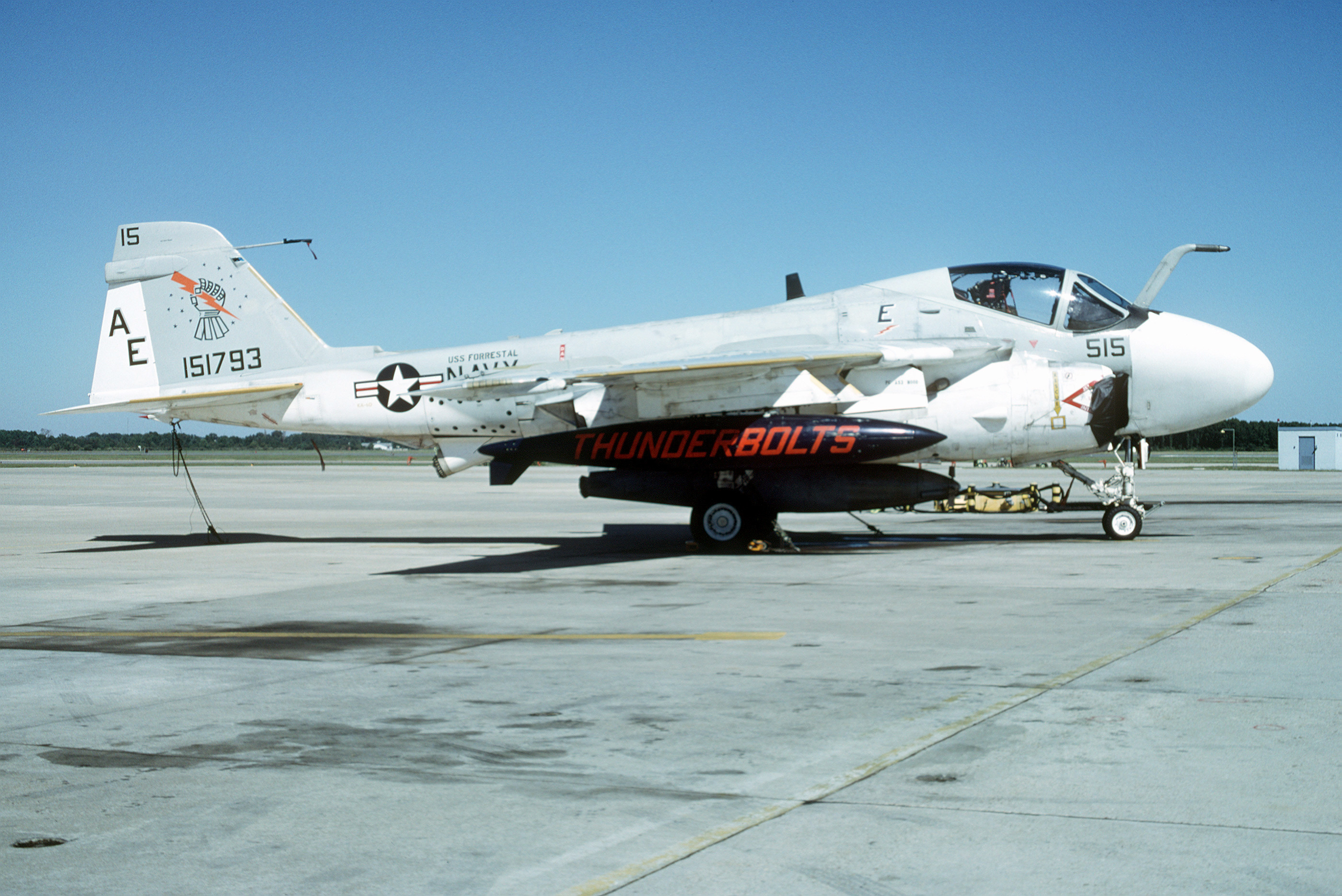
VA-176 KA-6D Intruder tanker aircraft

In 1967 VA-176 was back in the Mediterranean Sea aboard the USS Saratoga as part of CVW-3.

This was the last cruise with the Douglas A-1H Skyraider, as the squadron converted to the Grumman A-6A Intruder all-weather attack plane. From its first deployment with the Intruder in 1970 to the last in 1991, VA-176 was assigned to CVW-6. From 1970 to 1975, CVW-6 was assigned to the USS Franklin D. Roosevelt. The next three years were spent aboard the USS America. In 1979 the wing moved to the USS Independence, followed by the USS Forrestal from 1986 to 1991. Flying the Intruder, VA-176 made eighteen deployments to the Mediterranean Sea, three of which also led to the Indian Ocean. The squadron earned three consecutive Battle "E" awards, for the years 1988-1991. The squadron was decommissioned from active service on 30 October 1992.

== Aircraft ==
- Douglas AD-6 Skyraider (after 1962 A-1H) — 1955–1967
- Douglas A-4 Skyhawk
- Grumman A-6A Intruder — 1969–1975
- Grumman KA-6D Intruder — 1972–1992
- Grumman A-6C Intruder — 1973–1975
- Grumman A-6E Intruder — 1975–1992

== See also ==
- History of the United States Navy
- List of inactive United States Navy aircraft squadrons
- List of United States Navy aircraft squadrons
