= Enterprise Air Group =

- Active: 1 July 1938 – 1 September 1942
- Country: United States
- Branch: United States Navy
- Type: Carrier air wing
- Engagements: World War II; Attack on Pearl Harbor; Doolittle Raid; Battle of Midway; Battle of the Eastern Solomons
- Decorations: Presidential Unit Citation (1943)

The Enterprise Air Group was established on 1 July 1938, encompassing all squadrons embarked in USS Enterprise (CV-6). The group was divided into four squadrons, each with eighteen aircraft dedicated to a particular role. The squadrons were designated according to their role, and all were given the unit number six, derived from the hull number of the Enterprise. Bombing Six (VB-6) was equipped with Douglas SBD-2 Dauntless dive bombers, Fighting Six (VF-6) with Grumman F4F-3 Wildcat fighters, and Torpedo Six (VT-6) with Douglas TBD Devastator torpedo bombers. The fourth squadron, Scouting Six (VS-6) also had the SBD-2 Dauntless, but was more focused on the scout bomber role. This air group was embarked on board the Enterprise at the time of the attack on Pearl Harbor.

== World War II ==
World War II operations by Enterprise Air Group
| Period | Operations | Squadrons | | | |
| Period | Operations | Fighter | Bomber | Torpedo | Scout |
|---|---|---|---|---|---|
| 7 December 1941 – 10 March 1942 | Pearl Harbor, Marshall Islands, Wake Island, Marcus Island | VF-6 | VB-6 | VT-6 | VS-6 |
| 8 April 1942 – 26 April 1942 | Doolittle Raid | VF-6 | VB-6 | VT-6 | VS-6 |
| 30 April 1942 – 26 May 1942 | Efate Island | VF-6 | VB-6 | VT-6 | VS-6 |
| 28 May 1942 – 13 June 1942 | Battle of Midway | VF-6 | VB-6 | VT-6 | VS-6 |
| 15 July 1942 – 25 August 1942 | Guadalcanal campaign, Battle of the Eastern Solomons | VF-6 | VB-6 | VT-3 | VS-5 |

On 7 December 1941, eighteen SBD Dauntless scout bombers of squadrons VS-6 and VB-6 arrived over Pearl Harbor during the attack and, although surprised, immediately went into action in defense of the naval base. Scouting Six lost six planes during the attack, and Bombing Six lost one, killing eight airmen and wounding two others. Later that evening, six VF-6 Wildcats attempted to land at Ford Island, but five were accidentally shot down by friendly anti-aircraft fire, killing three pilots and wounding two others. Enterprise's air group carried out search missions to locate the Japanese carrier task force that attacked Pearl Harbor, but was unable to locate that force. Enterprise aircraft did sink a Japanese submarine on 10 December, but was unable to relieve the U.S. Marine garrison on Wake Island which fell to the Japanese.

The Enterprise's air group launched air strikes against Japanese shipping and military installations on Marshall and Gilbert island groups on 1 February 1942, followed by air raids on Wake Island on 24 February and Marcus Island on 4 March. Enterprise's air group provided air cover for the Task Force 16 which launched the Doolittle Raid from the carrier Hornet (CV-8) on 18 April. This mission prevented Enterprise and Hornet from participating in the Battle of Coral Sea which saw the Lexington (CV-2) sunk and the Yorktown (CV-5) heavily damaged.

=== Battle of Midway ===
The Battle of Midway was the climactic naval battle in 1942, with the Enterprise's air group sinking the Japanese carriers Kaga and Akagi and contributing to the sinking of Hiryū. Torpedo Six (VT-6) lost ten TBD-1, Bombing Six (VB-6) lost eleven SBD-3, Scouting Six (VS-6) lost nine SBD-3, and Fighting Six (VF-6) lost an F4F-4.

During the battle, then-Lieutenant Commander Wade McClusky, leading the Air Group, made a critical tactical decision that led to the sinking of two of Japan's fleet carriers, Kaga, and Akagi. When McClusky could not find the Japanese carriers where he expected them, and with his air group's fuel running dangerously low, he spotted the Japanese destroyer Arashi steaming north at flank speed. (The Arashi had stayed behind to attack the USS Nautilus, which had been harassing the Japanese fleet.) Taking the Arashi's heading led him directly to the enemy carriers. He then directed his dive-bombers into an attack which led to the destruction of both Kaga and Akagi. During this engagement, McClusky, who previously commanded a Fighter Squadron and had few hours on an SBD dive bomber, called "All planes attack!" after leading Scouting Six and Bombing Six to the Japanese Carrier Fleet without dividing up targets, resulting in the entirety of Scouting Six and two of the three divisions of Bombing Six diving on the Kaga. However, Lieutenant Dick Best of Bombing Six peeled off the third division and managed to score hits on Akagi, playing a crucial role in the battle.

=== Guadalcanal ===
The Enterprise Air Group participated in the initial stages of the Guadalcanal Campaign, flying sorties in support of the invasions of Tulagi and Guadalcanal and performing CAP and antisubmarine patrols for the amphibious shipping in the area. The Air Group fought in the Battle of the Eastern Solomons on 24 August 1942, which was a strategic and tactical victory that blunted the Japanese counteroffensive during Guadalcanal campaign. When the Enterprise was damaged during the battle, elements of the Air Group were transferred to Henderson Field at Guadalcanal, where they continued to fly as part of the Cactus Air Force in support of the invasion until their supply of aircraft was depleted.

== Disestablishment and legacy ==
After returning to Pearl Harbor, the Enterprise Air Group was disestablished on 1 September 1942. Enterprise embarked Air Group 10 for her next series of operations. The Navy had changed its air group designation scheme, assigning numbers rather the name of the ship to which the group was assigned. A new air group designated Carrier Air Group SIX was established months later, in March 1943 and assigned to Enterprise. Due to the manner in which the United States Navy determines unit lineage, in which a unit's lineage begins at establishment and ends at disestablishment, the Enterprise Air Group and Carrier Air Group SIX are two separate and distinct units and do not share a lineage.

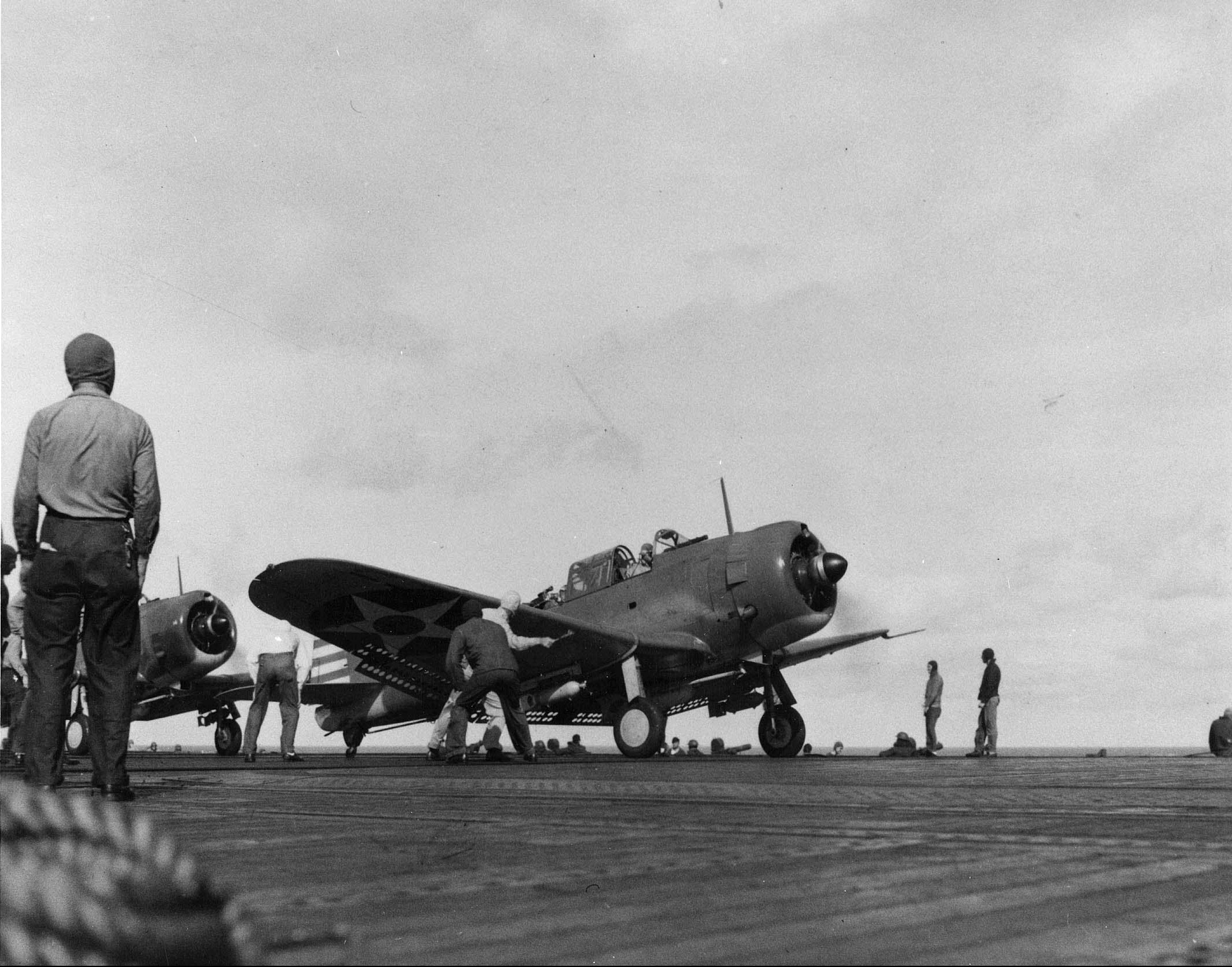
Marshall Islands Raid, February 1942

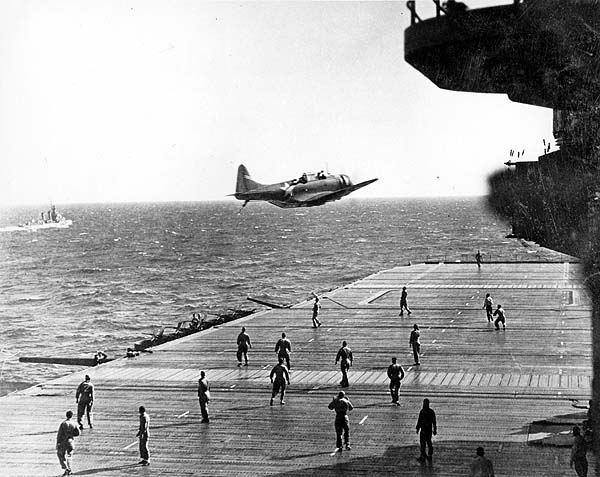
Doolittle Raid, May 1942

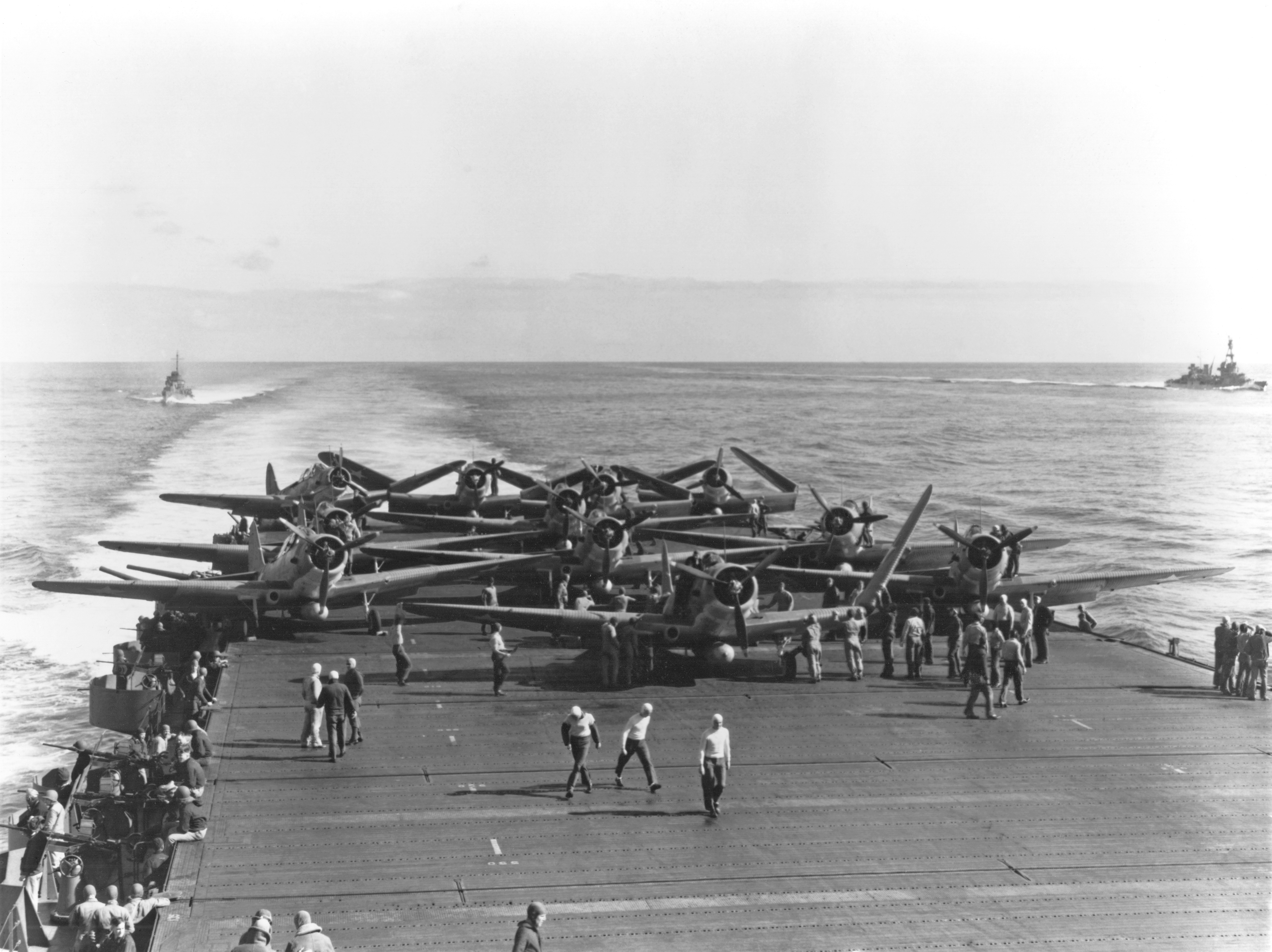
Battle of Midway, June 1942

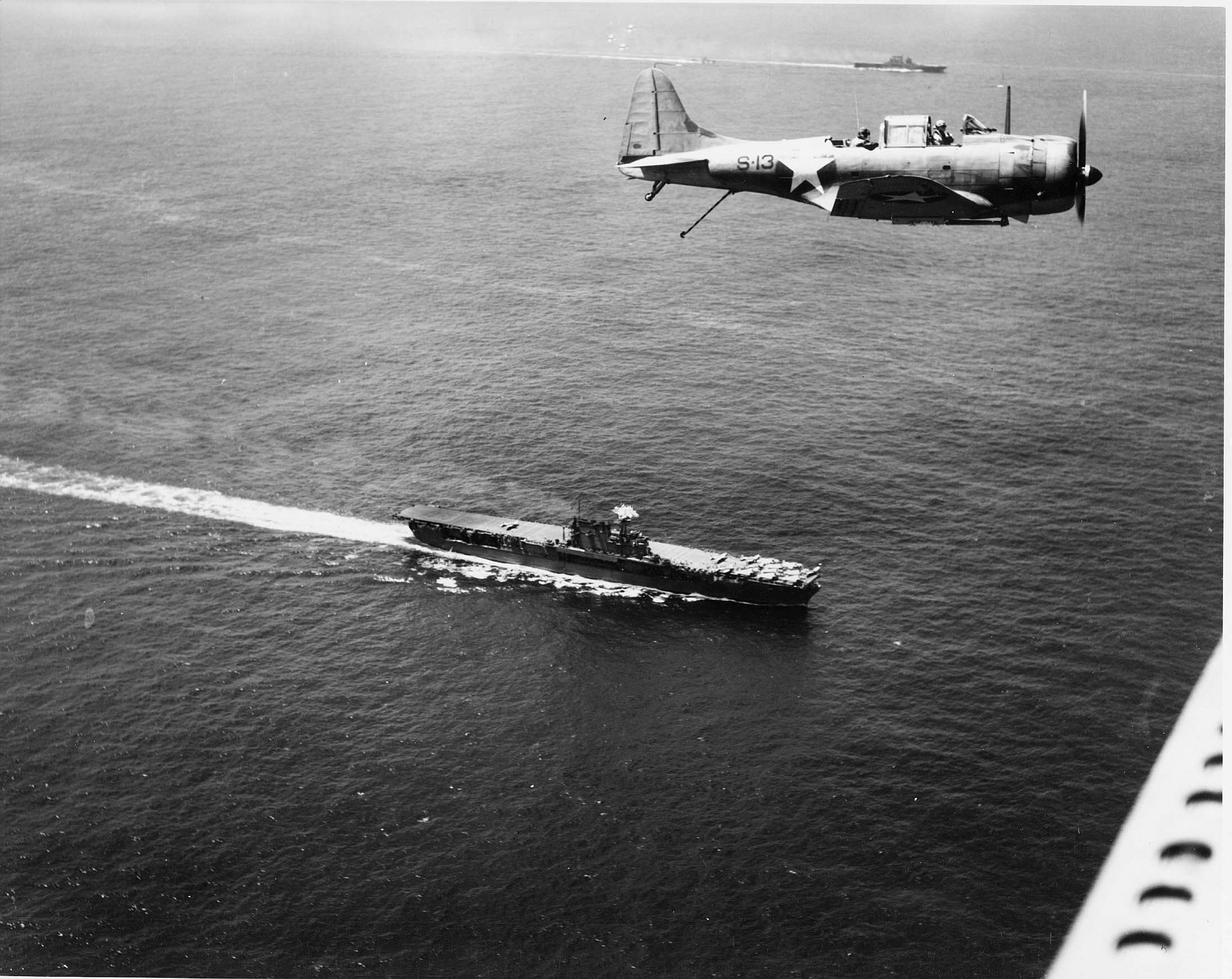
Off Guadalcanal, December 1942

== Awards and commendations ==
=== Presidential Unit Citation ===

For consistently outstanding performance and distinguished achievement during repeated action against enemy Japanese forces in the Pacific war area, 7 December 1941, to 15 November 1942. Participating in nearly every major carrier engagement in the first year of the war, the Enterprise and her air group, exclusive of far-flung destruction of hostile shore installations throughout the battle area, did sink or damage on her own a total of 35 Japanese vessels and shoot down a total of 185 Japanese aircraft. Her aggressive spirit and superb combat efficiency are fitting tribute to the officers and men who so gallantly established her as an ahead bulwark in the defense of the American nation.
