= Pocomoke (disambiguation) =

Pocomoke may refer to:

- The Pocomoke people, a historic Native American tribe
- Pocomoke City, Maryland, a town
- Pocomoke Indian Nation, a cultural heritage group and nonprofit based in Maryland
- Pocomoke River, a tributary of the Chesapeake Bay on the Eastern Shore of Maryland
- Pocomoke Sound, a bay of the Chesapeake Bay
- Pocomoke State Forest, Maryland
- USS Pocomoke, the name of three United States Navy ships
