= Indigenous peoples of Maryland =

Maryland Indigenous tribal areas prior to European arrival – red is Algonquian, green is Iroquoian, blue is Siouan.

The Indigenous peoples of Maryland are the tribes who historically and currently live in the land that is now the State of Maryland in the United States of America. These tribes belong to the Northeastern Woodlands, a cultural region.

Only 2% of the state's population self-reported as having Native American ancestry in the 2020 US census. Many of these individuals belong to Native American tribes and Indigenous peoples of the Americas whose territory is outside of Maryland.

Indigenous peoples have inhabited the area at least since c. 10,000 BC. In 1608, Captain John Smith first made contact with tribes in the Chesapeake Bay. European settlers first settled in Maryland in 1634, but as the century progressed, violence and hostility between Indigenous peoples and European settlers increased. Various treaties and reservations were established in 17th and 18th century, but many Native peoples left the area in the mid-to-late 18th century. Today, individual Native Americans live throughout the state, including a sizable Lumbee population in Baltimore.

Most of Maryland's historical Native American population consisted of Algonquian and Iroquoian speaking peoples, with a smaller Tutelo-speaking population emigrating to the area in the mid-18th century. Many of these peoples assimilated into settler society or moved to the Great Lakes region or Oklahoma as part of widespread Indian removal efforts in the 19th century.

Maryland has no federally recognized tribes, but the state recognizes three tribes: the Piscataway-Conoy Tribe of Maryland, the Piscataway Indian Nation and Tayac Territory, and the Accohannock Indian Tribe. A state commission on Indian Affairs serves eight unrecognized tribes. State agencies consult with federally recognized tribes with historic ties to Maryland, including several Iroquois tribes, two of the three Lenape tribes, and all three Shawnee tribes. Some Assateague people, Nanticoke, and Piscataway people moved north to Canada with the Haudenosaunee, where their descendants are citizens of the Six Nations of the Grand River First Nation. Some citizens of the Seneca–Cayuga Nation in Oklahoma are Susquehannock descendants. Lenape people are citizens of several federally recognized tribes in Oklahoma and Wisconsin, as well as several First Nations in Canada.

== History ==
=== Precontact ===
Paleo-Indians inhabited Maryland beginning in c. 10,000 BC as the Pleistocene ice sheet retreated, having come from other areas of North America to hunt.

Members of the Monongahela culture lived in the western portion of Maryland, constructing sites such as the Barton Village Site and Meyer Site. Evidence found at the Barton Village Site suggests that the area was occupied from c. AD 1000 to 1500.

=== 17th century ===
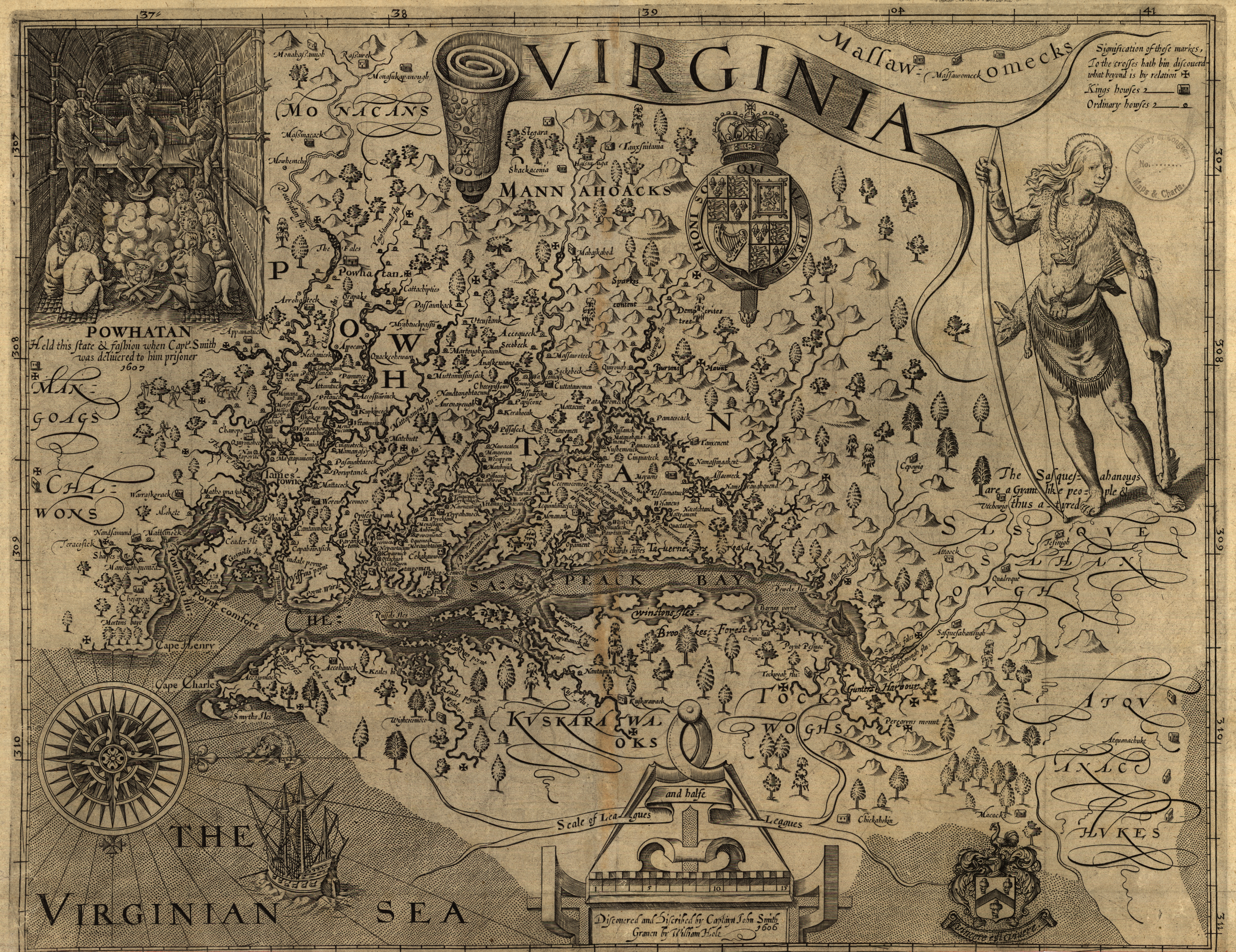
Map of the Chesapeake Bay by John Smith, 1612

Captain John Smith explored and mapped the Chesapeake Bay and its surrounding area from 1607 to 1609, interacting with several Native American groups along the way. On his 1607 voyage, Smith was captured near the Chickahominy River in Virginia and taken to Powhatan. While in captivity, he learned and recorded a significant amount about the lifestyle, language, and politics of the local Native Americans.

The first European settlers in Maryland founded the settlement of St. Mary's City after arriving at St. Clement's Island in 1634. This land was purchased by Leonard Calvert from the Yaocomico people, who inhabited the site prior to colonial arrival. This was a largely peaceful interaction, with the two groups sharing the settlement until the Yaocomico left at the end of the growing season.

In 1659, Colonel Edmund Scarborough led a series of unprovoked raids against the previously peaceful Assateague people. Referred to as the "Seaside War of 1659," this series of raids increased natives' hostility towards European settlers.

Several treaties were signed between Maryland Colony and various local Native American peoples after 1650, including the Assateagues, Nanticokes, and Susquehannocks. Various Native American reservations were also established during this period, including Askiminokonson.

=== 18th century ===
Treaties between settlers and Native Americans continued in the 18th century, with roughly 3,000 acres being set aside by the colony as Native American reservations.

In June 1744, the leaders of the Six Nations gave up all of their claims within the colony.

The Nanticoke tribe relinquished their land in June 1768, with the General Assembly's records stating that "they are desirous of totally leaving this Province and going to live with their Brethren who have incorporated themselves with the Six Nations."

=== 19th century ===
The Nanticoke tribe was recognized by Maryland in 1881 as a legal entity.

=== 20th century ===
In the mid-20th century, a community of about 7,000 Lumbee people from North Carolina moved to the Upper Fell's Point and Washington Hill neighborhoods in Baltimore. Members of the Lumbee community founded the Baltimore American Indian Center in 1968 as the American Indian Study Center to assist Native American residents in the area.

=== 21st century ===
In the 2010 census, about 20,000 Maryland residents, or 0.4% of the state, self-reported American Indian as their only race. More than 50,000 people in Maryland self-identified as being at least part American Indian, constituting 1.0% of the total state population. That number jumped by 119% to over 120,000 in the 2020 census, representing 2% of the total state population. This increase, following a nationwide trend, is attributed for many factors, including Hispanic and Latino Americans increasingly identifying as Indigenous, people with blood myths of Native identity now self-identifying as being Native (particularly Cherokee descent), grassroots community documentation work and decolonization efforts aimed at removing a stigma surrounding Indigenous family history. The largest Maryland Native American populations reported in the 2020 census were in Baltimore City and Anne Arundel, Baltimore, Montgomery, and Prince George's counties.

== Historical Indigenous peoples ==
Prior to European arrival and the subsequent removal of Indigenous people from the area, Native Americans occupied most of modern-day Maryland. Native American territorial boundaries were fluid during this period, with groups often sharing territory and moving regularly.

=== Choptank ===
The Choptank people lived in modern-day Talbot, Dorchester, and Caroline counties, including the town of Cambridge. They were the only Indigenous group granted a reservation by the Maryland colony, which they lived on until the land was sold to developers by the government in 1822.

=== Lenape ===
Some Lenape, or Delaware, people lived in modern-day Cecil County. Like many other Lenape, most of these residents were forced to Indian Territory by the 1850s.

=== Massawomeck ===
The Massawomeck's presence in Maryland was mostly within modern-day Allegany County and Garrett County. They conducted raids against the coastal nations and traded heavily with other Native peoples and Europeans. The group's fate is largely unknown, disappearing from historical record in 1635.

=== Matapeake ===
The Matapeake people lived on Kent Island and had contact with William Claiborne in 1631. Due to European encroachment on the island in the 17th and 18th centuries, many Matapeake left and assimilated into other Algonquian peoples.

=== Nanticoke ===
The Nanticoke people inhabited much of the Delmarva Peninsula, including modern-day Salisbury and Princess Anne. A member of the Powhatan Confederacy, the Nanticoke were named "Kuskarawaok" by John Smith in 1608. Most Nanticoke left Maryland by the 1750s, with others assimilating into European society in the area.

=== Susquehannock ===
The Susquehannock people were present in modern-day Allegany, Cecil, and Harford counties. After warring with Maryland colony from 1642 to 1652, the group signed a peace agreement that gave much of the land south of the mouth of the Susquehanna River to Maryland. This effectively ended the people's presence in Maryland.

=== Tuscarora ===
The Tuscarora people emigrated to Maryland after losing the Tuscarora War, in which they lost much of their land to North Carolinian settlers. Their presence was short-lived, with the people passing through Frederick County from 1719 to 1721. The group ultimately settled in the Great Lakes Region and became a member of the Haudenosaunee Confederacy.

=== Yesang ===
John Smith did not encounter any Siouan language-speaking tribes 1608 exploration. However, the Monacan, Saponi, and Tutelo peoples emigrated through Maryland during the mid-19th century. Some small bands of the Saponi and Tutelo were found in the area following this emigration. The Saponi band settled in Dorchester County, with both groups likely later assimilating into the local Nanticoke population.

== Tribal legal recognition ==
=== Federal recognition ===
There are no federally recognized tribes within Maryland. However, Section 106 of the National Historic Preservation Act of 1966 requires the State of Maryland to consult with federally recognized Native American tribes on all projects that could affect historic tribal lands or other properties with cultural or religious significance to Native nations.

Federally recognized tribes with historic ties to Maryland are:

- Haudenosaunee: Oneida Indian Nation, Onondaga Nation, Tuscarora Nation, Saint Regis Mohawk Tribe, Seneca–Cayuga Nation
- Lenape: Delaware Nation, Delaware Tribe of Indians
- Shawnee: Absentee-Shawnee Tribe of Oklahoma, Eastern Shawnee Tribe of Oklahoma, Shawnee Tribe

=== State recognition ===
Three tribes are state-recognized by the State of Maryland:

- Accohannock Indian Tribe
- Piscataway-Conoy Tribe of Maryland, includes the Piscataway Conoy Confederacy and Sub-Tribes as well as the Cedarville Band of Piscataway Indians
- Piscataway Indian Nation

== Self-identified organizations ==
Numerous organizations in Maryland are self-identified tribes and cultural heritage groups who often form nonprofit organizations. In addition to the three state-recognized tribes, the Maryland Commission on Indian Affairs also works with these organizations:

- Assateague Peoples Tribe
- Nause-Waiwash Band of Indians
- Notoweega Nation, Filed with the Maryland Indian Commission for state recognition 6/9/2021.
- Pocomoke Indian Nation
- Youghiogheny River Band of Shawnee Indians
