= Thomas Savage (Virginia interpreter) =

Early English colonist (1594–1633)

Ensign Thomas Savage
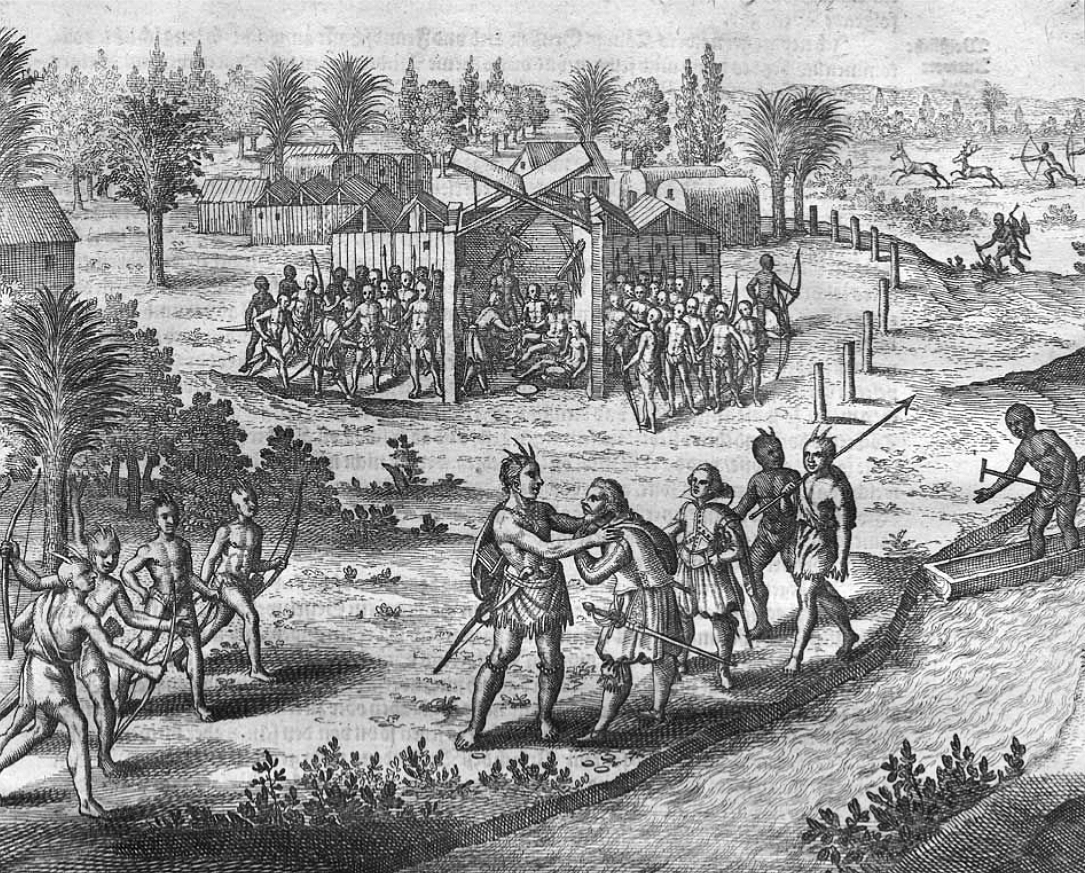
- Young Thomas Savage accompanying Ralph Hamor in a meeting with Powhatan, 1614
- Born: c. 1594; Cheshire, England
- Died: 1633 (aged 38–39); Accomac Shire, Virginia
- Other names: Thomas Salvage, Thomas Savadge, Thomas Newport
- Occupations: Adventurer, Powhatan interpreter, ancient planter

Thomas Savage (b. c. 1594 – d. 1633) was an English adventurer to the Virginia colony. At age thirteen he emigrated to the New World, and soon after lived with Powhatan (Native American leader) as a cultural emissary from 1608 to 1610. Savage became a Powhatan language interpreter for the English. Savage settled on the Eastern Shore of Virginia where he interacted with native leader Debedeavon. Thomas Savage was an ancient planter, married a tobacco bride, and had a son (John) that represented Northampton County, Virginia in the House of Burgesses.

== Young Virginia adventurer (1608–1610) ==
Thomas Savage (sometimes written as "Salvage" or "Savadge") was probably born in Cheshire, England, in 1594. Recorded as a "boy, labouror", Savage traveled with Captain Christopher Newport on the John and Francis with the First Supply mission to Jamestown, arriving with about 100 other settlers in early 1608. Newport treated Savage like a son, and told the natives that he was a kinsman.

In February 1608, to aid Powhatan-English relations, Savage was "gifted" to Powhatan in trade for young native page (servant) named Namontack (or "Namotacke"). Thomas Savage resided in Werowocomoco, while Namontack served as emissary abroad in England with Captain Newport. Namontack would attempt to return to Virginia on the fated Sea Venture supply mission, but would be killed in Bermuda (c. 1610).

Thomas Savage became fluent in the Virginia Algonquian dialect, observed the Powhatan culture, and kept the English informed as to the native relations. Savage interacted with Pocahontas, who was about the same age. In August 1609, Henry Spelman of Jamestown (aged fourteen) accompanied Thomas Savage to also be an emissary. Eventually, Samuel Collier (John Smith's page) also served as an emissary. As 1609 ended, native relations with the English had turned hostile. Councillor John Ratcliffe was tortured and killed by native women. Savage was sent back to Jamestown, possibly to prevent native military tactics from being overheard. During the winter of 1609 and 1610, the Starving Time reduced the English to only 60 settlers, but Thomas Savage survived.

== Life between 1614 and 1623 ==
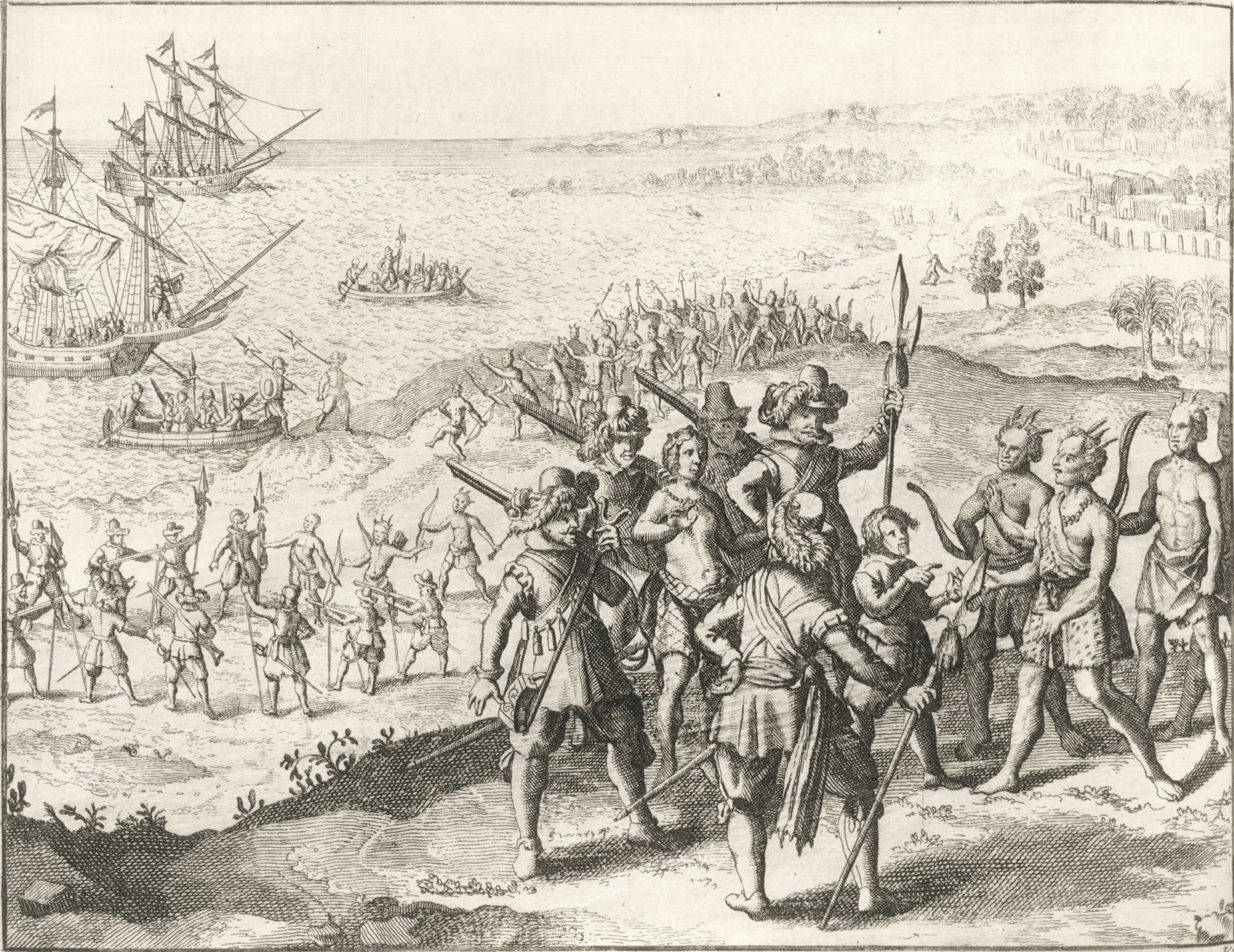
Thomas Dale, Ralph Hamor, and Thomas Savage ask for the hand of Powhatan's daughter, Pocahontas

In May 1614, Thomas Savage was sent with Ralph Hamor to setup an arranged marriage between Thomas Dale and Powhatan's youngest daughter, but the endeavor failed. By 1619, Savage lived at Martin's Brandon plantation. Likely during the on-and-off Anglo-Powhatan Wars, he was given a rank of Ensign.

In 1621, Ensign Savage (aged about 27 years) accompanied John Pory on trading expeditions to the Eastern Shore of Virginia. He developed a special relationship with Accomack and Occohannock people, notably leader Debedeavon. Around the same time period, Savage communicated with the Virginia Company of London that the French were trading fur with the natives in Chesapeake Bay, offering an opportunity to English enterprise. Debedeavon eventually gifted Savage 9,000 acres (36 km^{2}) of land on the Eastern Shore, called Savage's Neck. Debedeavon warned Savage of a plot to poison Englishmen by Opechancanough, which Savage reported to Royal Governor Francis Wyatt, but the warning was ignored. Beginning in March 1622, the Indian massacre of 1622 killed almost 350 non-native settlers.

== Life after 1623 ==
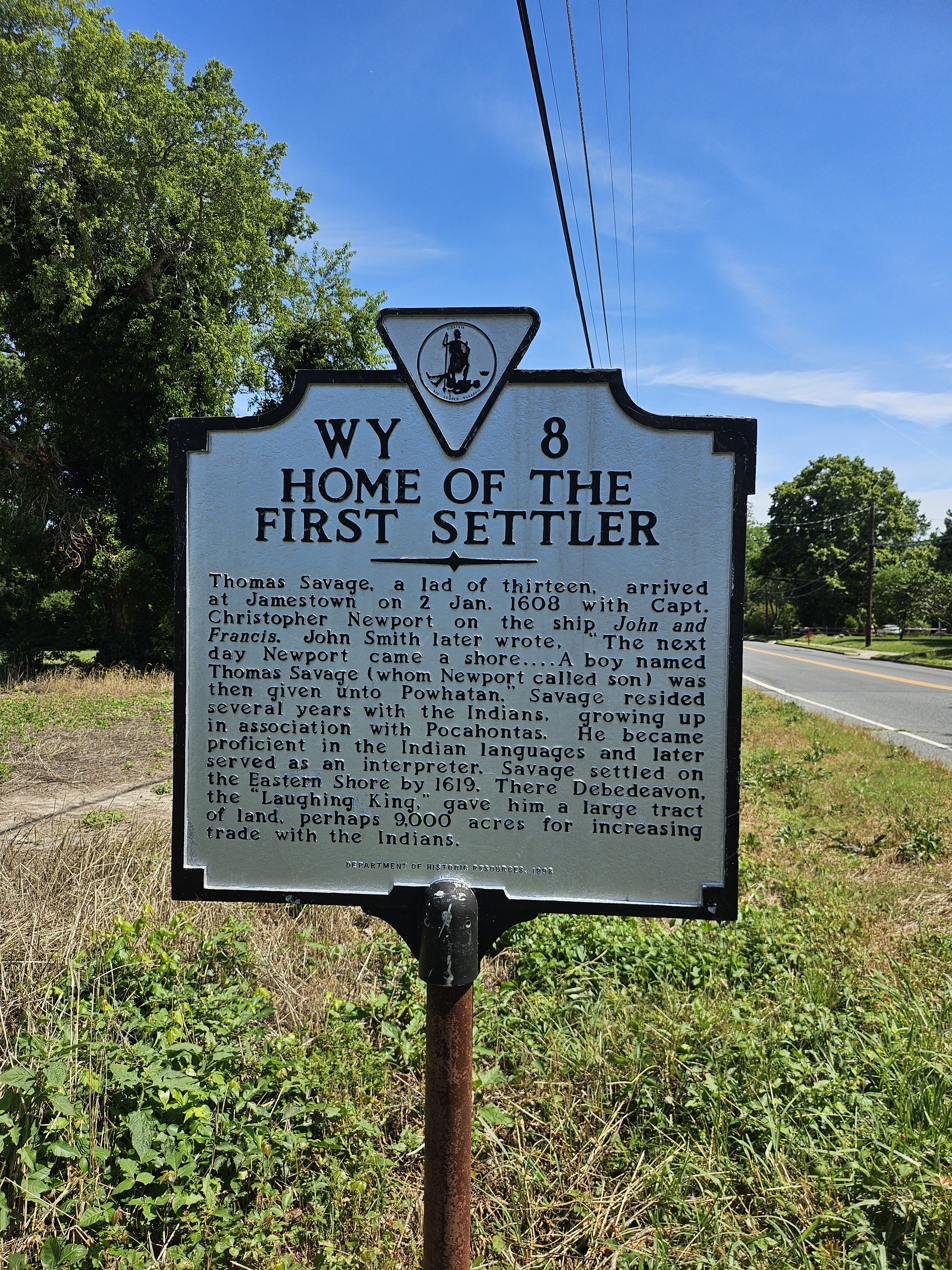
Historical marker in Eastville, Virginia

In c. 1623, Thomas Savage married Hannah (or Ann) "Tyng", who arrived on the Seaflower as a "tobacco bride". The couple had a son, John, around 1624. Thomas Savage became wealthy by trading, specifically fur trading. By early 1625, Savage was recorded as possessing a house, a barn, a boat, and two servants. In c. 1626, Thomas Savage (now an ancient planter) owned Savage's Choice, a 150 acres (0.61 km^{2}) plantation.

Around the same time period, Savage came in conflict with George Yeardley and associate Captain William Eppes, and was brought up on legal charges. By March 1625, Savage was forced into the government's service, by way of official interpreter of the Accomac Shire region. Savage continued to serve as an interpreter until his death in or before September, 1633. He was survived by his son (who inherited his land) and his wife. Hannah (Ann) remarried a planter named Daniel Cugley by 1638. A carpenter named Thomas Savadge [sic] (fl. 1632) also lived in Accomacke, but was not the same person.

== See also ==
- Savage Neck Dunes Natural Area Preserve
- Savage Town, Virginia and Savageville, Virginia
- Accomac Shire (became Northampton County, Virginia)
- Accomack County, Virginia
