= All Hallows Parish, Maryland =

All Hallows Parish, Maryland may refer to:

- All Hallows Parish, South River, Anne Arundel County, Maryland: All Hallows Church, South River
- All Hallows Parish, Snow Hill, Worcester County, Maryland: All Hallows Episcopal Church
