= USS Pocomoke =

USS Pocomoke is a name given to three ships of the United States Navy:

- USS Pocomoke (SP-265), a minesweeper and tug commissioned in 1917 and sold in 1922
- USS Pocomoke (SP-571), a patrol vessel in commission from 1917 to 1918
- USS Pocomoke (AV-9), a seaplane tender in commission from 1941 to 1946
