= Pocomoke people =

Historical Indigenous people in Maryland, U.S.

Pocomoke
Total population
- extinct as a tribe

Regions with significant populations
- Maryland

Languages
- Eastern Algonquian

Religion
- Indigenous religion

Related ethnic groups
- Nanticoke, Assateague

The Pocomoke people were an Indigenous people of the Northeastern Woodlands whose territory encompassed the rivers Pocomoke, Great Annemessex, Little Annemessex, and Manokin, the bays of Monie and Chincoteague, and the sounds of Pocomoke and Tangier in Maryland.

== History ==
When the United States government developed plans to sequester the Maryland tribes to reservations, most tribal chiefs chose to leave their indigenous lands and join tribes in New York and Pennsylvania. A portion of the Pocomoke people remained in the Eastern Shore region of Maryland which included the Annamessex, Manokin, Nassawattex and Acouintica peoples. Together, these tribes founded Askiminikansen Reservation (also known as Askiminokonson Indian Village) in approximately 1666 northwest of Snow Hill, Maryland. The town had the largest Native American concentration in Maryland in 1671. Later, the reservation accepted members of the Assateague, Chincoteague, and Nassawatox tribes.

The Askiminikansen Reservation was defunct around the second quarter of the 18th century. The reservation's dissolution was largely due to two factors. First, Maryland's colonial state government did not treat "Indian" as a racial classifier but, instead, as a cultural or political classifier. This meant that a member of the Askiminikansen Reservation must explicitly identify themselves as "Indian" to be legally counted amongst the members of the reservation and have treaty rights applied to their person. Otherwise, the individual would assume assimilation with Maryland's general public. Askiminikansen Reservation membership subsequently dwindled due to inaction. Second, the reservation's demise was accelerated by the encroachment of European American tobacco plantation owners who gradually seized Askiminikansen Reservation land. After the dissolution of the Askiminikansen Reservation the Pocomoke people were legally assimilated by the Maryland government if they chose to remain in the state

Many died during the 17th and 18th centuries due to European epidemics, massacres by Virginia colonists, and forced displacement from their traditional territory by numerous land grants and patents to settlers.

Beginning in about 1742, some Pocomoke families moved northward by way of the Susquehanna River and settled in present-day Pennsylvania and Canada, while others cohabited with the Assateague, Nanticoke, and the Choptanks near the Indian River.

== Subtribes ==
Several related nations were considered subgroups of the Pocomoke:

- Acquintica, also spelled Aquintankec, Aquinteca
- Annamessex, Annamessick
- Gingoteque, Chingotegue, Gingateege, Gingo Teague, Yingoteague
- Manokin, Mannanokin, Monoakin
- Morumsco
- Nasswatex, Nuswattax
- Quandanquan.

== Heritage group ==
The Pocomoke Indian Nation, which is not recognized as a tribe, claims to descend from the Pocomoke people. It is an unrecognized tribe that incorporated as a 501(c)(3) nonprofit organization in 2014. No petition has been submitted to date for requesting formal recognition from the United States or the State of Maryland.
