= Bog iron =

Form of iron ore deposited in bogs

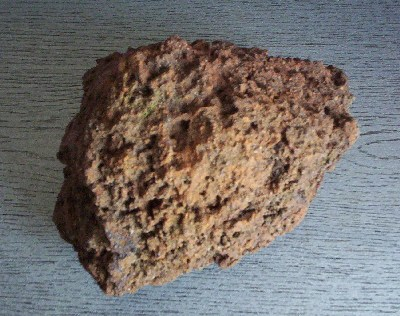
Bog ore

Bog iron is a form of impure iron deposit that develops in bogs or swamps by the chemical or biochemical oxidation of iron carried in solution. In general, bog ores consist primarily of iron oxyhydroxides, commonly goethite (FeO(OH)), and related limonite.

Iron-bearing groundwater typically emerges as a spring and the iron in it forms ferric hydroxide upon encountering the oxidizing environment of the surface. Bog ore often combines goethite and magnetite, and may include vugs and stained quartz. Oxidation may occur through enzyme catalysis by iron bacteria. It is not clear whether the magnetite precipitates upon the first contact with oxygen, then oxidizes to ferric compounds, or whether the ferric compounds are reduced when exposed to anoxic conditions upon burial beneath the sediment surface and reoxidized upon exhumation at the surface.

Bog iron, like other hydrous iron oxides, has a specific affinity for heavy metals. This affinity combined with the porous structure and high specific surface area of bog iron make it a good natural sorbent. These properties combined with the fact that bog iron is cheap to obtain are incentives for its utilization in environmental protection technologies.

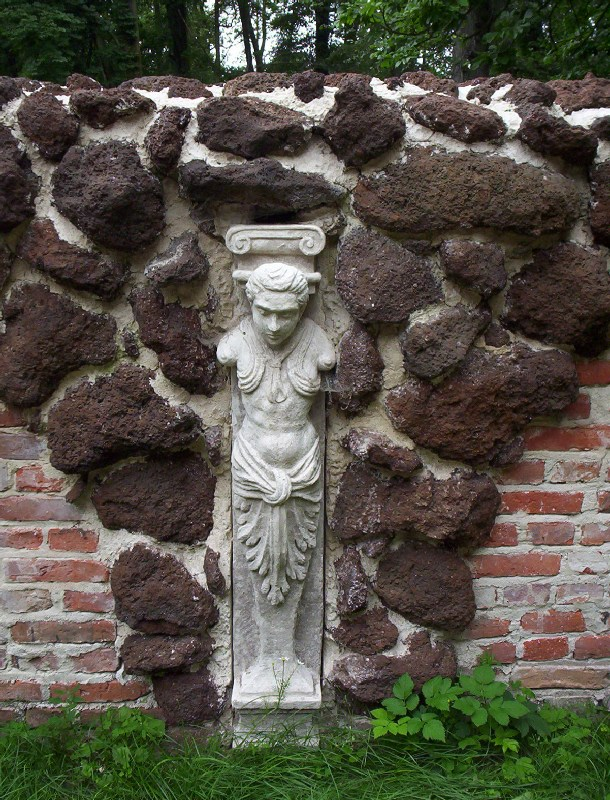
Part of Wall with Herma—usage of bog ore in architecture

Iron made from bog ore will often contain residual silicates, which can form a glassy coating that imparts some resistance to rusting.

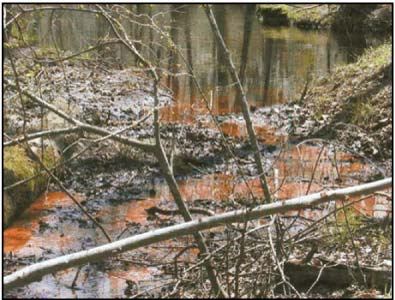
Typical iron-bearing groundwater emerging as a spring. The iron is oxidized to ferric hydroxide upon encountering the oxidizing environment of the surface. A large number of these springs and seeps on the flood plain provide the iron for bog iron deposits.

== Formation ==
Iron is carried to bogs in low-pH, low-dissolved oxygen iron-bearing groundwater that reaches the surface through springs, along with structures of fractures, or where groundwater intersects surface flows. The iron in the water is then oxidized by dissolved oxygen or, through enzyme catalysis by iron bacteria (e.g., Thiobacillus ferrooxidans and Thiobacillus thiooxidans) that concentrate the iron as part of their life processes. Presence of these bacteria can be detected by the oily film they leave on the surface of the water. This change of oxidation state causes the precipitation of fine-grained iron solids near the point of groundwater discharge. A variety of iron minerals, such as goethite, magnetite, hematite, schwertmannite, and amorphous iron-aluminum-sulfate-rich solids, can be formed via oxidation of ferrous iron under the acidic conditions present. All photosynthesizers play dual roles as oxygen producers, and thus passive iron oxidizers, and as surfaces to which the iron can sorb or bind. This causes aquatic plants to become heavily encrusted with a light-orange floc of iron oxyhydroxide near the point of oxygen gas released from the plants. Factors such as local geology, parent rock mineralogy, ground-water composition, and geochemically active microbes and plants influence the formation, growth, and persistence of iron bogs. Bog iron is a renewable resource; the same bog can be harvested about once each generation.

== Iron extraction ==
Europeans developed iron smelting from bog iron during the Pre-Roman Iron Age of the 5th/4th–1st centuries BCE, and most iron of the Viking Age (late first millennium CE) was smelted from bog iron. Humans can process bog iron with limited technology, since it does not have to be molten to remove many impurities. Due to its easy accessibility and reducibility, bog iron was commonly used for early iron production. Early metallurgists identified bog-iron deposits by indicators such as withered grass, a wet environment, hygrophilous grass-dominated vegetation, and reddish-brown solutions or depositions in nearby waters. They stabbed wooden or metal sticks into the ground to detect larger ore-deposits, and cut and pulled back layers of peat in the bog using turf knives to extract smaller, pea-sized nodules of bog iron. Early iron-production from bog ore mostly occurred in bloomery furnaces. The resources necessary for production were wood for charcoal, clay for the construction of bloomery furnaces, and water for processing. Iron in the ore is reduced to a spongy iron bloom that stays in the upper part of the furnace while the undesirable elements stream downwards as slag. Smelting with a bloomery furnace often results in between 10 and 20 mass percent Fe being reduced to iron bloom, while the rest is transferred into the slag. The bloom must then be consolidated with a hammer to make usable wrought iron. There is some archaeological evidence that lime was added to furnaces to treat silica-rich ores that were difficult to smelt by the bloomery process.

== Europe ==
The first iron smelting attempts date to the 2nd millennium BCE in the Near East. The technology then spread throughout Europe in the following two millennia, reaching Poland in the 2nd century BCE. Iron production reached Scandinavia around 800–500 BCE. Iron production sites in central Sweden are dated to the late Bronze Age and the innovation might have been transmitted from both the south and the east. The ore used was limonite in the form of red soil and bog ore. From 200 CE ore from limonite-deposits in lakes was used. The ore was reduced in bloomeries. There is evidence of a direct relationship between Viking settlements in northern Europe and North America and bog iron deposits. Bog iron dominated the iron production of Norse populated areas, including Scandinavia, Finland and Estonia, from 500 to 1300 CE. Large scale production of bog iron was also established in Iceland at sites known as "iron farms". Smaller scale production sites in Iceland consisted of large farmsteads and some original Icelandic settlements, but these seemed to only produce enough iron to be self-sufficient. Even after improved smelting technology made mined ores viable during the Middle Ages, bog ore remained important into modern times, particularly in peasant iron production. In Russia, bog ore was the principal source of iron until the 16th century, when the superior ores of the Ural Mountains became available.

== North America ==
=== Pre-Columbian ===
Iron was produced by the Vikings on Newfoundland around 1021 CE. Excavations at L'Anse aux Meadows have found considerable evidence for the processing of bog iron and the production of iron ore. The settlement at L'Anse aux Meadows was situated immediately east of a sedge peat bog and 15 kg of slag was found at the site, which would have produced around 3 kg of usable iron. Analysis of the slag showed that considerably more iron could have been smelted out of the ore, indicating that the workers processing the ore had not been skilled. This supports the idea that iron processing knowledge was widespread and not restricted to major centers of trade and commerce. Ninety-eight nail fragments were also found at the site as well as considerable evidence for woodworking which points to the iron produced at the site possibly being used only for ship repair and not tool making.

=== Colonial North America ===
Bog iron was widely sought in colonial North America. The earliest known iron mines in North America are the mines from St. John's, Newfoundland, reportedly in operation by Anthony Parkhurst in 1578. The first mining efforts in Virginia occurred as early as 1608. In 1619 Falling Creek Ironworks was established in Chesterfield County, Virginia. It was the location of the first blast furnace facility in North America.

Lake Massapoag in Massachusetts was drawn down by deepening the outlet channel in a search for bog iron. The Saugus Iron Works National Historic Site, on the Saugus River in Saugus, Massachusetts, operated between 1646 and 1668. The site contains a museum and several reconstructed buildings. The success of the Saugus Iron Works, and the rapid depletion of the region's natural bog iron, led the owners to send prospectors into the surrounding countryside. In 1658 the company bought 1,600 acres (6.5 km^{2}) of land which covered areas that are now Concord, Acton, and Sudbury. They set up a large production facility in Concord, Massachusetts, along the Assabet River with dams, ponds, watercourses, and hearths, but by 1694 the natural bog iron there had also been exhausted, and the land was sold for farming.

In Central and Southern New Jersey, bog ore was mined and refined for the production of naturally rust-resistant tools and wrought iron rails, many of which still grace staircases in Trenton and Camden. During the American Revolution, bog iron cannonballs were cast for the colonial forces.

=== 19th century United States ===
Bog iron was also found on the Eastern Shore of Maryland. The remains of a commercial smelting operation near Snow Hill, Maryland, are now a state and national historic site. Known as Furnace Town, it was called the Nassawango Iron Furnace after the nearby creek. The commercial furnace ran from about 1825 to 1850.

The Shapleigh Iron Company constructed a smelter at North Shapleigh, Maine, in 1836 to exploit a small bog iron deposit in Little Ossipee Pond. The plant commenced operation in 1837, but according to an 1854 history of Shapleigh "the business [proved] unprofitable, therefore after a few years it was abandoned."

== See also ==
- Limonite – Hydrated iron oxide mineral
- Iron ore – Ore rich in iron or the element Fe
- Ore genesis – How the various types of mineral deposits form within the Earth's crust
- Acidithiobacillus ferrooxidans – Genus of bacteria (iron-oxidizing bacteria)
- Ferrous metallurgy – Metallurgy of iron and its alloys
