= Annemessex =

Annemessex is a word referring to many aspects of the lower Somerset County, Maryland area. It may refer to:

- Annemessex people, an Indigenous people in Maryland
- The Big Annemessex River, a tributary of the Chesapeake Bay
- The Little Annemessex River, which flows through Crisfield, Maryland
- Annemessex Neck, the original name for Crisfield, Maryland prior to European colonization
