= Annamessex =

Historic Native American tribe

Total population
- extinct as a tribe

Regions with significant populations
- Maryland

Languages
- unattested Eastern Algonquian language

Religion
- Indigenous

Related ethnic groups
- Pocomoke people

The Annamessex people were a Native American nation from the Eastern Shore of Maryland. Their homelands were part of present-day Somerset County, Maryland.

Along with the Manokin, Nasswatox, and Aquintica, the Annamessex were a subgroup of the Pocomoke people, like the Manokin to their immediate north and the Morumsco at their immediate south. The Nanticoke and Choptank lived north of the Pocomoke, while the Accomac people lived further south in Virginia.

== History ==
English settlers from the Roanoke Colony made contact with the weroancies in this region in the 1580s, while Spanish colonists also explored the area.

The leaders of the Annamessex and neighboring tribes signed a peace treaty with the English in 1678.

On May 6, 1686, weroances from the Annamessex and other Pocomoke people, headquartered at Askiminokonson met with the Land Office Commissioners of Maryland. They reported that British squatters from Accomac Shire, including by Charles Scarborough, had encroached upon their lands and British-owned cattle were destroying their crops. The land office designated a reservation for those tribes.

== See also ==
- Annemessex Neck, early name for Crisfield, Maryland
- Big Annemessex River
