= Samuel Gunn House =

Historic house in Maryland, United States

- U.S. National Register of Historic Places
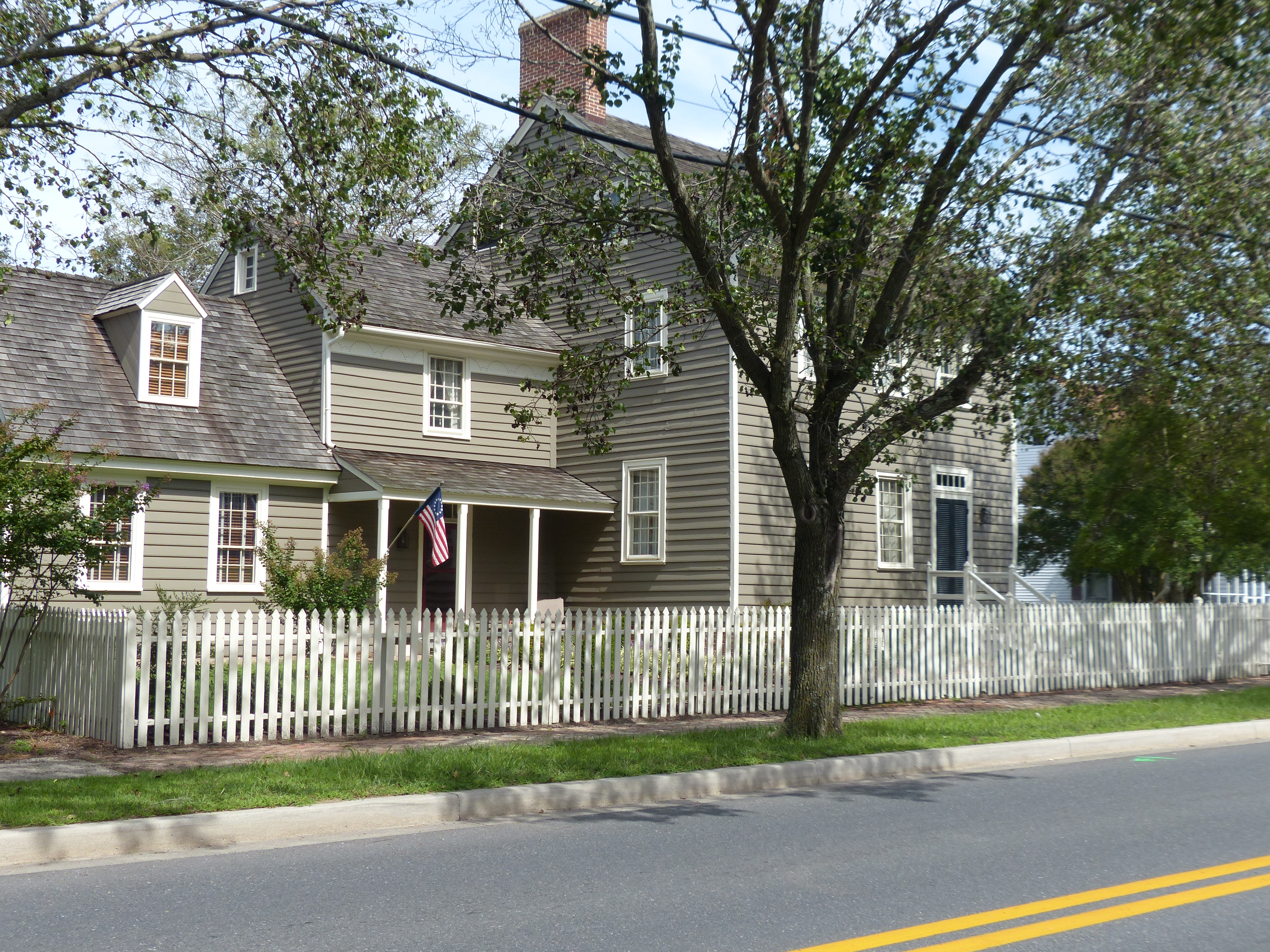

- Location within Maryland Location within the United States
- Location: 200 W. Market St., Snow Hill, Maryland
- Coordinates: 38°10′32″N 75°23′46″W
- Area: less than one acre
- Built: 1780
- Architectural style: Georgian
- NRHP reference No.: 02001594
- Added to NRHP: December 27, 2002

The Samuel Gunn House is a historic house in Snow Hill, Worcester County, Maryland. Built around 1780, it is one of the oldest and best preserved of the 18th century Georgian town dwellings in Worcester County. It is a two-story, side hall / double pile frame house. It was listed on the National Register of Historic Places in 2002.
