= Tobacco brides =

Women betrothed to settlers of Jamestown, Virginia

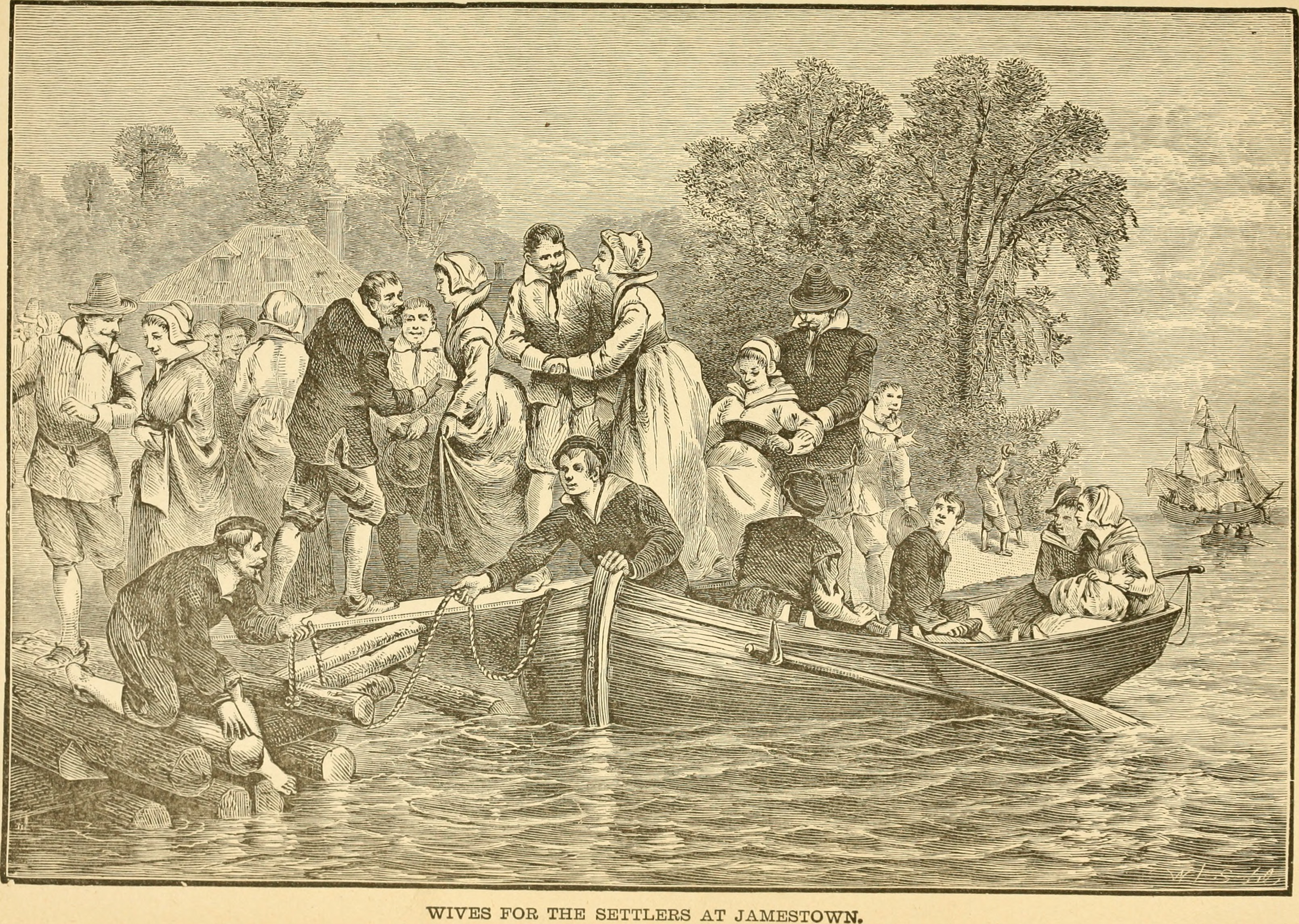
Wives for the settlers at Jamestown (John Clark Ridpath)

A tobacco bride (or "tobacco wife") is a descriptive name for a young woman that emigrated to Colonial Virginia to marry a settler. Following the settlement of Jamestown, Virginia colony in the early 1600s there was a vast gender imbalance, as most of those who left for Jamestown were men who were tasked with building and establishing the settlement itself. There were about 100 women with families already in colonial Virginia, but there was still a significant gender divide (7∶1 men to women). Beginning in 1619, young single women from England were offered by Virginia Company of London the opportunity to travel to Jamestown to marry and start families and to increase the population.

The expense of the women's travels fell upon the men of the colony, who paid with 150 pounds (68 kg) of tobacco to the Virginia Company. These "Maids for Virginia" were incentivized by the promise of land ownership, inheritance rights, as well as their own discretion to choose their own husband (all of which were luxuries not awarded to women in England).

Around 90 women made the decision to travel to Jamestown in 1619. In 1620, the ship The Marmaduke added 13 more women to Virginia. The next year, 57 more women were shipped. By 1622, roughly 144 women had arrived in Jamestown. The ages of the women varied; among the youngest of the women was Jane Dier, who was around fifteen to sixteen years old when she departed. One of the oldest women was Alice Burges who was 31 or 32 (Note: It was claimed that Alice Burges was only 28 years old, but other records claim she was 31 years upon departure to Virginia). Many tobacco brides came to America fleeing hardship, but many also suffered once in America. Despite their hardships, these women paved the way for the women of the future by escaping the assigned "maid" role and instead gaining more economic freedom and independence than was given to other women of this time, leading some to dub them the "Founding Mothers".

== Known Jamestown maids ==
1. Mary Bayley (Bailey)
2. Abigail Downing

Maids from the Marmaduke (sailed August 1621)

1. Susan Binx, aged 20
2. Margaret Bordman (Bourdman), aged 20
3. Anne Buergen
4. Allice Burges, aged 31-32 (see footnote)
5. Jane Dier, aged 15
6. Catherine Finche, aged 23
7. Mary Ghibbs, aged 20
8. Ann Harmer, aged 21
9. Audrey Hoare, aged 19
10. Ann Jackson
11. Lettice King, aged 23
12. Ursula Lawson
13. Ann Tanner, aged 27

Maids from the Warwick (sailed September 1621)

1. Martha Baker, aged 20
2. Cicely Bray, aged 25
3. Frauncis Broadbottom, aged 19
4. Ellen Borne, aged 19
5. Elizabeth Bovill (Borrill), aged 20
6. Ellen Davy, aged 22
7. Alse Dollinges, aged 22
8. Ann Holmes, aged 20
9. Elizabeth Markham, aged 16
10. Mary Morrice, aged 20
11. Ann Parker, aged 20
12. Lucy Remnant, aged 22
13. Ann Richards (or Anne Rickard), widow, aged 25
14. Jennet Rimer, aged 20
15. Cristian Smyth, aged 18
16. Parnell Tenton, aged 20
17. Mary Thomas, aged 18
18. Ann Westcote, aged 20

Maids from the Tiger (sailed September 1621)

1. Elizabeth Browne, aged 16
2. Anne Gibbson, aged 21
3. Allice Gough, gentlewoman, aged 28
4. Priscilla Palmer, aged 7 or 8

Maids from the Seaflower (sailed c. 1621)

1. Jane Berkeley (Berkley), future widow of Lt. Edward Berkeley
2. Hannah (Ann) "Tyng", future wife of Thomas Savage

== See also ==
- Women of Colonial Virginia
- The Wives of Jamestown
- Ancient planter
- Casquette girl
- Plaçage
- King's Daughters
- Marriage à la façon du pays
- Bride buying

== Notes ==
References
