= Furnace Town Living Heritage Museum =

Outdoor museum near Snow Hill, Maryland, United States

Coordinates: 38°12′17″N 75°28′14″W

Furnace Town Historic Site
- Location: 3816 Old Furnace Road; Snow Hill, Maryland 21863
- Type: History
- Website: Furnace Town Historic Site

The Furnace Town Historic Site is an outdoor museum near Snow Hill, Maryland. The museum contains various historic buildings, including most importantly the Nassawango Iron Furnace, an early 19th-century brick blast furnace that was used to smelt bog iron ore to make pig iron. Other buildings, all of which have been moved to the site, include a church, a store, and several houses, one of which is used as an information center.

== R. Frank Jones Museum ==
This building was Initially constructed in 1869 and moved to the Furnace Town Village in 1977. The museum contains exhibits on the history of the local area and processing of pig iron.
