= Nassawango Iron Furnace Site =

- U.S. National Register of Historic Places
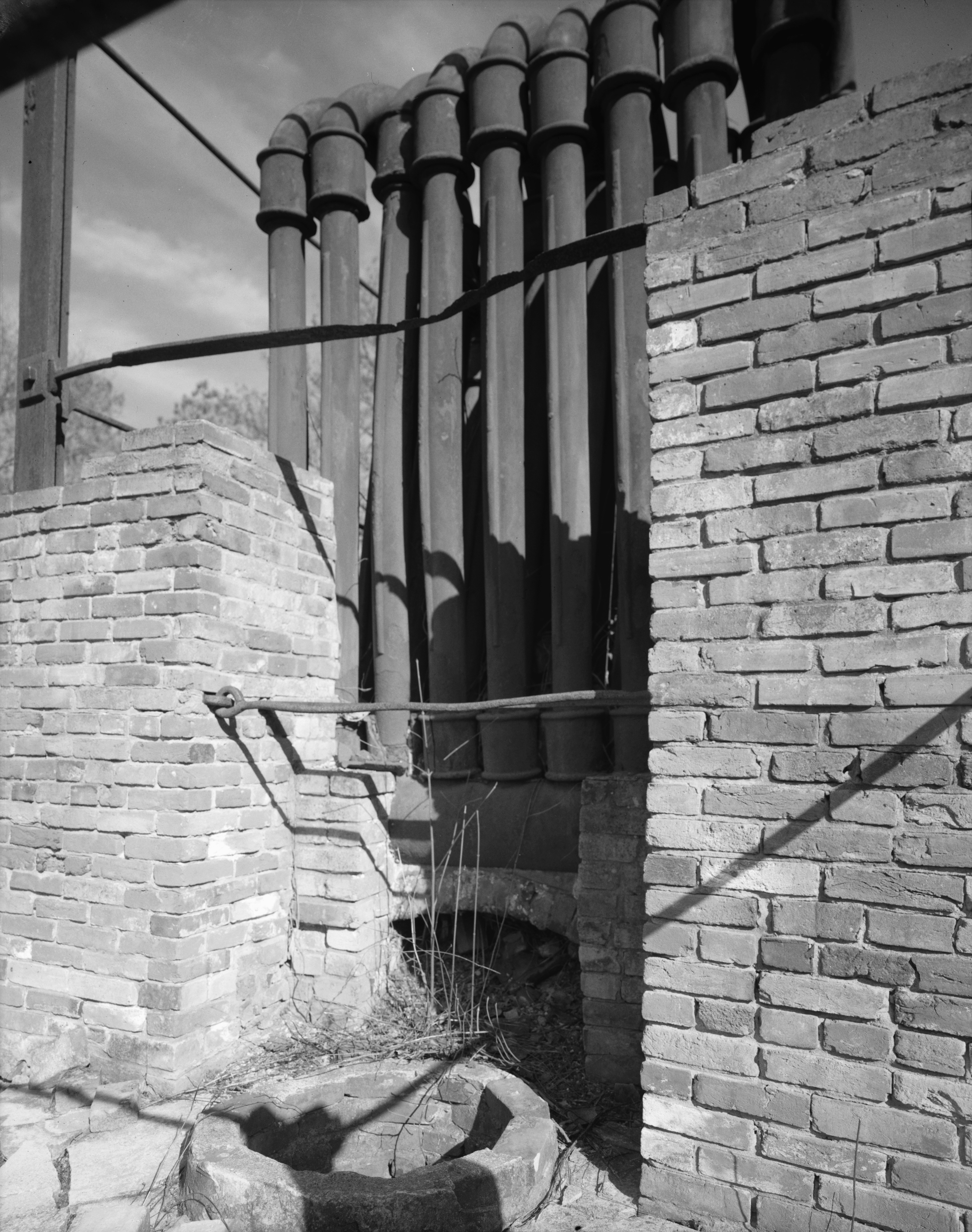

- Location within Maryland Location within the United States
- Location: On Old Furnace Road, northwest of Snow Hill off Maryland Route 12, Snow Hill, Maryland
- Coordinates: 38°12′15″N 75°28′8″W
- Area: 190 acres (77 ha)
- Built: 1830
- NRHP reference No.: 75000935
- Added to NRHP: October 31, 1975

The Nassawango Iron Furnace was built in 1830 by the Maryland Iron Company to produce iron from bog ore deposits in its vicinity. It is notable for its innovative use of a "hot blast" technique for smelting the iron, which had been developed in England around 1828, and which may have been added to the Nassawango Furnace in 1837. Due to the variable nature of the bog ore deposits, the furnace stopped operations in 1849.

The furnace is now centerpiece of the Furnace Town Living Heritage Museum.
