= Nun's Green =

Historic house in Maryland, United States

- U.S. National Register of Historic Places
- Location within Maryland Location within the United States
- Location: South of Snow Hill on Cherrix Rd., Snow Hill, Maryland
- Coordinates: 38°7′49″N 75°22′57″W
- Area: 5 acres (2.0 ha)
- NRHP reference No.: 79003263
- Added to NRHP: September 20, 1979

Nun's Green is a small 18th-century plantation house located in Snow Hill, Maryland, US, one of fourteen remaining structures from that era in Worcester County. It exhibits a characteristic three-part layout, with a main block joined by a lower hyphen to a kitchen block in the rear.

Nun's Green was listed on the National Register of Historic Places in 1979.
