= Chanceford =

Historic house in Maryland, United States

- U.S. National Register of Historic Places
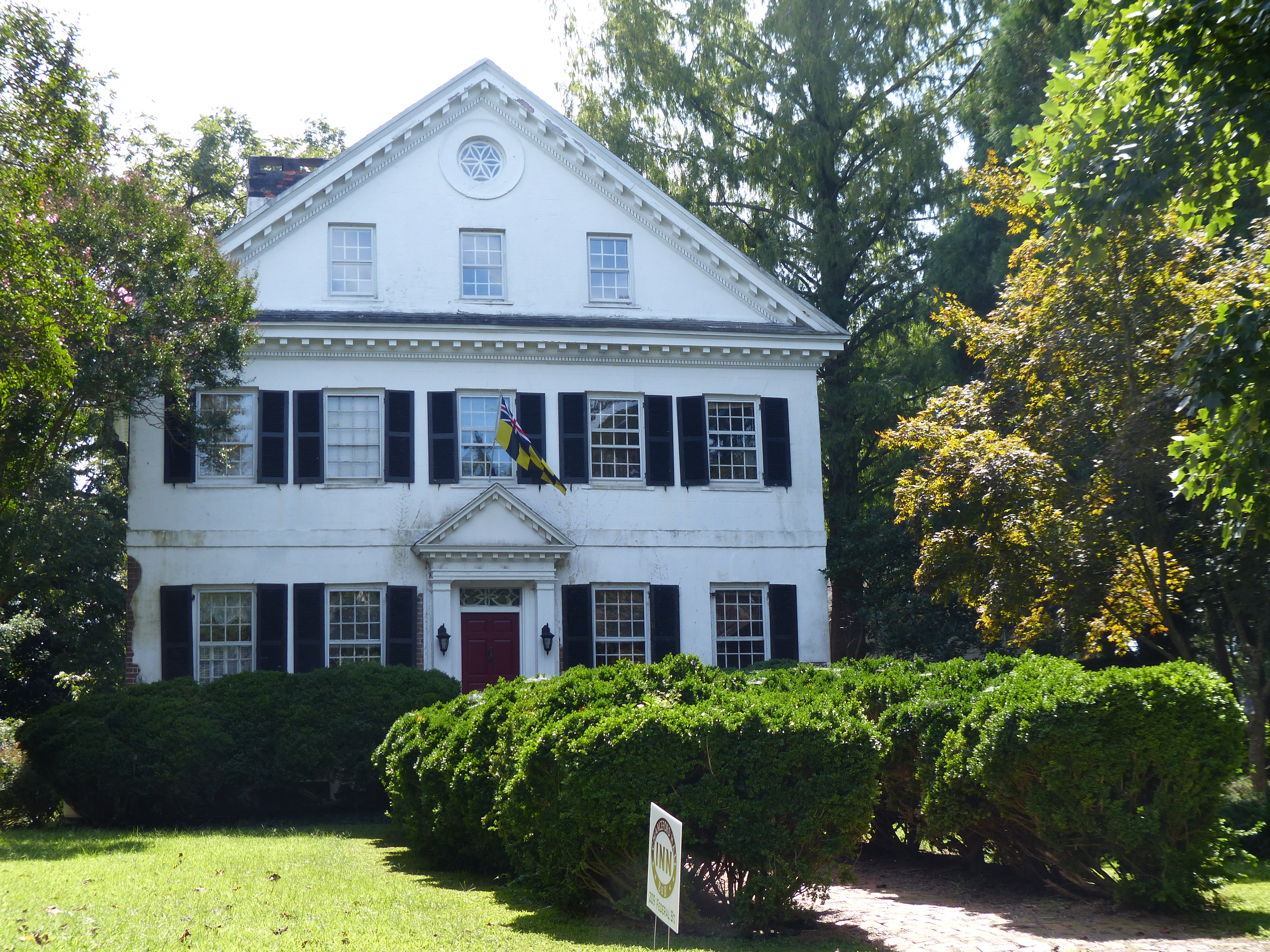

- Location within Maryland Location within the United States
- Location: 209 W. Federal Street, Snow Hill, Maryland
- Coordinates: 38°10′22″N 75°23′48″W
- Area: 1 acre (0.40 ha)
- Built: 1792
- Architectural style: Federal
- NRHP reference No.: 94001077
- Added to NRHP: September 2, 1994

Chanceford is an 18th-century building in Maryland located at 209, West Federal Street, Snow Hill, Worcester County, Maryland. It is an early example of a neo-classical temple-fronted dwelling on the Eastern Shore of Maryland.

Built in 1792–93, Chanceford is a stuccoed brick house with a transverse hall. A single-story hyphen to the rear connects the main house to the two-story kitchen wing. The interior retains much of its original woodwork.

It was listed on the National Register of Historic Places in 1994. It is operated as bed and breakfast accommodation.
