= Accomac people =

Historical Native American tribe in Virginia

Accomac
Total population
- extinct as a tribe

Regions with significant populations
- Virginia

Languages
- unattested Eastern Algonquian language

Religion
- Indigenous

Related ethnic groups
- Powhatan Confederacy

The Accomac people (Note: Or Accawmack, Accawmacke, Accowmack, Accohanoc.) were a historic Native American tribe in Accomack and Northampton counties in Virginia. They were loosely affiliated with the Powhatan Confederacy. Archeological and historical records suggest trading relationships between the Accomacs and the Powhatans as well as other related groups such as the Occohannocks.

The term Accomac was eventually applied to a larger group of related Indigenous peoples living on the Eastern Shore of Virginia. To the north, the Eastern Shore of Maryland was home to the Pocomoke and related tribes, such as the Annamessex. Further north, the Assateague people lived on the Atlantic Coast of Maryland and Delaware.

== History ==
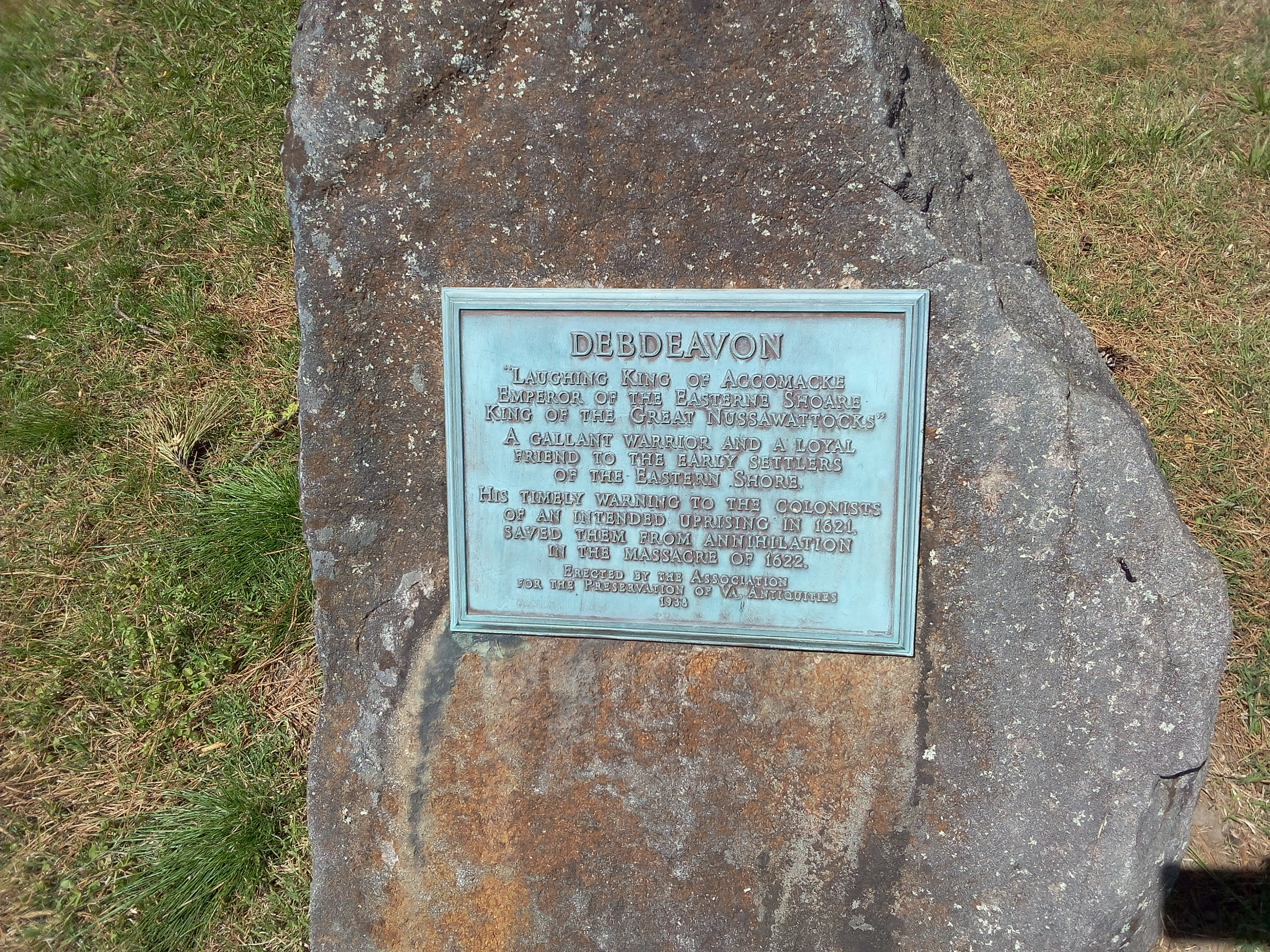
Monument to Debedeavon, a 17th-century Accomac chief

Their primary settlement, also called Accomac, was near present-day Cheriton, Virginia, on Cherrystone inlet in Northampton County. This settlement was located across the waters from Tsenacomoco and the powerful Powhatan Confederacy.

Debedeavon (Accomac, died 1657) was the principal chief of the Accomac when English colonists first arrived in 1608. They called him the "Laughing King" and allied with him. In 1608, the Accomac were recorded as having 80 warriors. This initial population estimate is likely already diminished due to spread of epidemic disease from initial contact with the Roanoke Colony in 1585. Based on disease profile descriptions involving high fatality rates, short illness lifecycle, and strongest outbreaks during cold seasons, this epidemic is thought to have been caused by an Influenza virus carried over from Europe for which the Accomac people did not have built up defenses.

Records indicate that by the mid 17th century, the British colonists had appropriated a majority of Accomac land. By 1700, the Accomac population had declined by approximately 90 percent due to introduced diseases such as smallpox and violence from the colonists. The colonists began calling all American Indians to the immediate east of Chesapeake Bay "Accomac." They maintained communal lands through 1812, mostly in and near Accomack County.

A subgroup, the Gingaskins, lived near present-day Eastville, Virginia. They intermarried with African Americans living nearby. After Nat Turner's Rebellion in 1831, local White Americans forcibly expelled them from their homelands.

== List of rulers ==
From the mid-17th century onward, the English people called the Accomac paramount chief "emperor" or "empress."

The list of emperors of Accomac:

1. Esmy Shichans, also known as the Laughing King
2. Okiawampe, also spelled Wackawamp
3. Tapatiapon or Debedeavon
4. Johnson

However, Debedeavon is considered to be the same person as Johnson by Fausz and the Laughing King by Upshur. Also, Okiawampe may have been the same person as Debedeavon.

The list of empresses of Accomac:

1. Empress of 1673 (Tabbity Abby?) who was mentioned by George Fox
2. Empress of 1705 (Mary?) who was mentioned by Robert Beverley

In 1673 the governor referred to the transfer of power from mother, Tabbity Abby, to daughter, Mary, and that same year George Fox wrote of the old Empress of Accomack. Mary is probably the empress who lived in Nanduye referred to by Robert Beverley in 1705.

== Culture and tradition ==
Little is known about the Accomac’s day to day life due to a scarcity of archival records and archeological excavation in the area. However, there is some evidence that the land was deer scarce. As such, the Accomac appear to have relied on fishing and horticulture over hunting for their nutritional needs. It is thought that corn and beans were their primary crops while the occasional deer was hunted in order to make clothing and tools.

== Subtribes ==
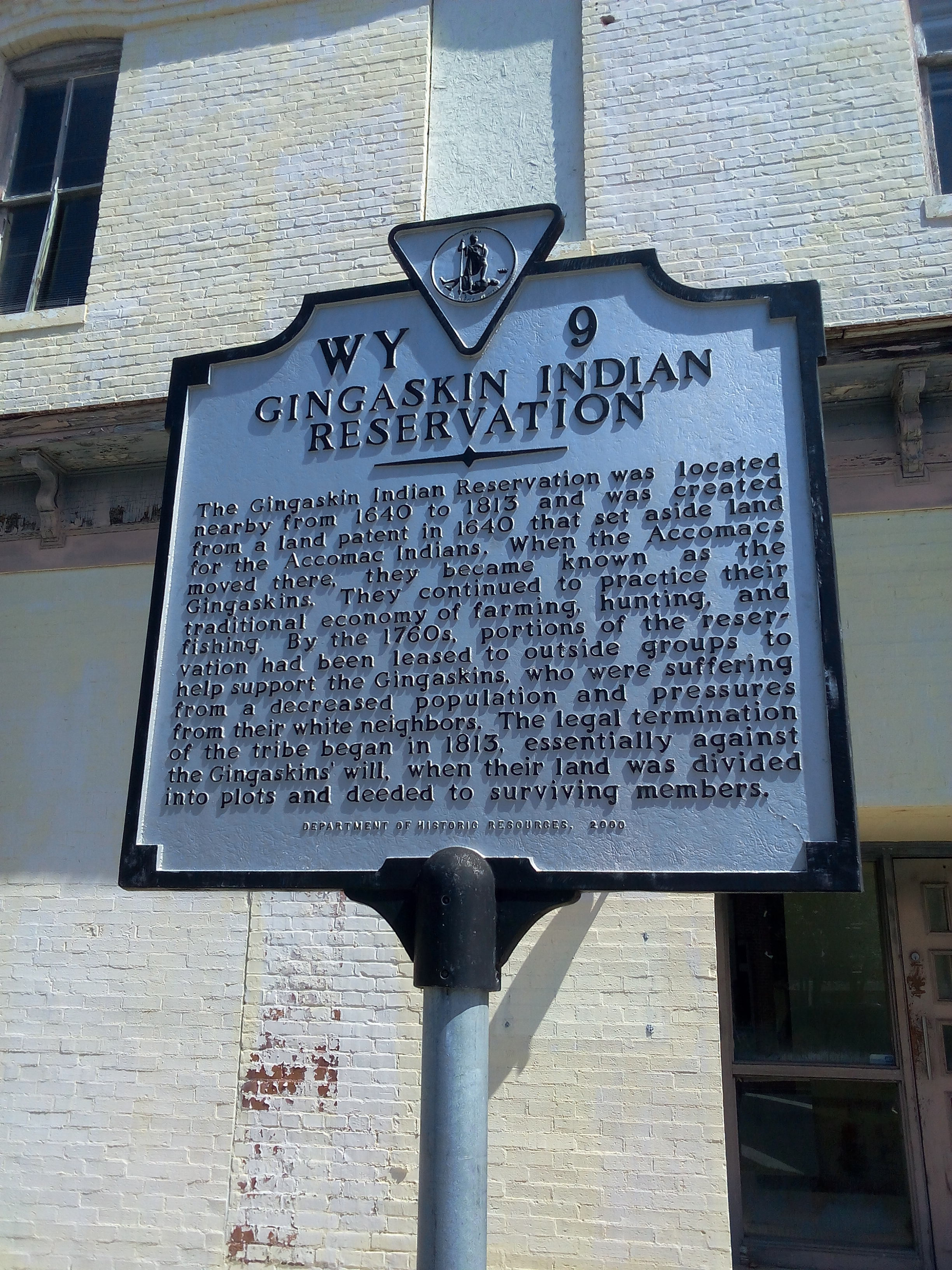
Historical marker for the Gingaskin Indian Reservation in Northampton, Virginia.

Subtribes of the Accomac included the following groups:

- Acohanock (Note: Or Accahanock, Accohanoc, Anancock, Accohannock, Accohanock, Oanancocke, Occoahannock, Onancock, Accotronack.)
- Chiconessex, Chicconessick
- Combec
- Gingaskin, Gangascoe, Gingaskoyne,
- Kiquotank, Kikotanke
- Matchapungo, Machepungo, Mastiapungo, Matchopungo,
- Macheteege
- Mashawatoc
- Matomkin, Matompkin, Motomkin
- Nadue, Nandewy, Nanduye
- Pungotege, Pungoteque.

== Name ==
Philologist James Hammond Trumbull wrote that Accomac means "the other-side place" or "on-the-other-side-of-water place." Alternative spellings include Accawmacke, Accomack, Accowmack, Acomack, and Acomak.

== Cultural heritage groups ==
Maryland designated the Accohannock Indian Tribe as a state-recognized tribe in 2017. They claim to be descendants of the Accomac people; however, historians and other Native American tribes dispute those claims. The Maryland-based organization should not be confused with the American Indigenous Accawmacke Indians, an unrecognized nonprofit organization based in Cape Charles, Virginia.

== See also ==
- Native American tribes in Virginia

== Bibliography ==
- Hodge, Frederick Webb (1911). Handbook of American Indians North of Mexico. Washington, DC: Smithsonian Institution.
- Feest, Christian F. (1978). Trigger, Bruce G. (ed.). Handbook of North American Indians: Northeast, Vol. 15. Washington, DC: Smithsonian Institution. pp. 240–248.
- Roundtree, Helen C. (1990). Pocahontas's People : The Powhatan Indians of Virginia through Four Centuries. Norman: University of Oklahoma Press. ISBN 978-0806128498.
- Roundtree, Helen C.; Davidson, Thomas E. (1997). Eastern Shore Indians of Virginia and Maryland. Charlottesville: University Press of Virginia. ISBN 978-0813918013.
- Mires, Peter B. (1994). "Contact and Contagion: The Roanoke Colony and Influenza". Historical Archaeology. 28 (3): 30–38. doi:10.1007/BF03374188. JSTOR 25616316.
- Wolfe, Brendan (2020-12-09). "Indigenous Peoples in Virginia". Encyclopedia Virginia.
