= Governor John Walter Smith House =

Historic house in Maryland, United States

- Gov. John Walter Smith House
- U.S. National Register of Historic Places
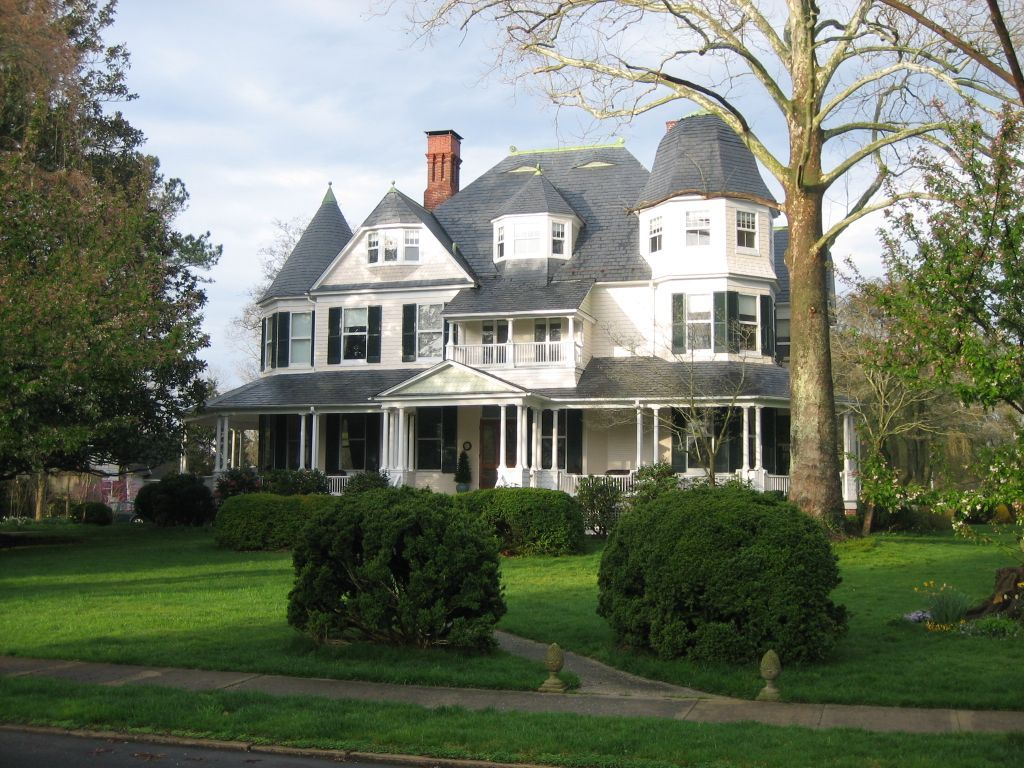
- Governor John Walter Smith House, April 2008

- Location within Maryland Location within the United States
- Location: 104 S. Church St., Snow Hill, Maryland
- Coordinates: 38°10′23″N 75°23′41″W
- Area: 1 acre (0.40 ha)
- Built: 1889
- Architect: Jackson C. Gott
- Architectural style: Queen Anne
- NRHP reference No.: 94001146
- Added to NRHP: September 15, 1994

The Governor John Walter Smith House is a historic home located at Snow Hill, Worcester County, Maryland. It is an unusually large and elaborate example of the Queen Anne style of domestic architecture. It was built in 1889-90 for local landowner John Walter Smith, who was later a United States representative, Governor of Maryland and United States Senator. The house retains its interior millwork and unusual Art Nouveau stained glass windows.

It was listed on the National Register of Historic Places in 1994.
