= Nanticoke language =

Indigenous language of the eastern US

Nanticoke
- Native to: United States
- Region: Delaware, Maryland
- Ethnicity: Nanticoke people
- Extinct: 1856, with the death of Lydia Clark
- Revival: 2007
- Language family: Algic: Algonquian; Eastern Algonquian; Nanticockan; Nanticoke

Language codes
- ISO 639-3: nnt
- Glottolog: nant1249

Nanticoke is an extinct Algonquian language spoken in Delaware and Maryland, United States. Similar languages were likely spoken by several neighboring tribes, including the Nanticoke; the Choptank, the Assateague, and probably also the Piscataway and the Doeg. In the 21st century, an effort has been made to revive the language.

== Revival ==
With the assistance of a native speaker, Myrelene Ranville née Henderson of the Sagkeeng First Nation in Manitoba, Canada, who speaks a similar language, Anishinaabemowin, the state-recognized Nanticoke Indian Association in Millsboro, Delaware, assembled to revive the language in 2007, using the vocabulary list of Thomas Jefferson. It had been "more than 150 years since the last conversation in Nanticoke took place." Similar efforts made by the Nanticoke Indian Association are also being taken through partnership with local linguists. In 2023, a book for the revitalization of the Nanticoke language was published.

== Phonology ==
Consonants
	Labial	Alveolar	Palatal	Velar	Glottal
Plosive	p	t		k	
Affricate		ts			
Fricative		s	ʃ		h
Nasal	m	n			
Approximant	w	l	j		

Vowels
	Front	Central	Back
Close	i iː		
Mid	e eː	ə	o oː
Open		a aː	

- Allophones of /e, ə, i, o, oː/ are heard as [ɛ, ɨ, ɪ, ɔ, uː].
- /l/ may have an allophone of [r] in word-final positions.

== Vocabulary ==
Nanticoke is sometimes considered a dialect of the Delaware language, but its vocabulary was quite distinct. This is shown in a few brief glossaries, which are all that survive of the language. One is a 146-word list compiled by Moravian missionary John Heckewelder in 1785, from his interview with a Nanticoke chief then living in Canada. The other is a list of 300 words obtained in 1792 by William Vans Murray, then a US Representative (at the behest of Thomas Jefferson.) He compiled the list from a Nanticoke speaker in Dorchester County, Maryland, part of the historic homeland.

=== Wordlist ===
These words are some of the listings in Murray's glossary. In the letter that accompanied his glossary, Murray noted that the Nanticoke were "not more than nine in number," and also stated that "they have no word for the personals 'he' and 'she.'" The exclamation point (!) indicates a "peculiar, forcible, explosive, enunciation" of a syllable in this phoneticization.

Selected words from W.V. Murray's glossary
Nanticoke	English
Nickpitq	Arm
Oaskagu	Black
Puhsquailoau	Blue
Matt Wheesawso	Brave
Wee Sawso Ak	Cowardly
Meetsee	To eat
Nucksskencequah	Eye
Ah!skaahtuckquia	Green
Muchcat	Leg
Atupquonihanque	Moon
Psquaiu	Red
Untomhowaish	To run
Nupp	To sleep
Ahquak/Aquequaque/Aequechkkq	Sun
Waappayu	White
Weesawayu	Yellow

== See also ==
- Piscataway language

== Notes ==
- Vans Murray, William (2009). A Vocabulary of the Nanticoke Dialect. American Language Reprints. Evolution Pub & Manufacturing. ISBN 9780964423435.
