= Assateague people =

Algonquin Native American tribe

Assateague
Total population
- 0 (unknown) unknown (including those of ancestral descent)

Regions with significant populations
- Eastern Shore of Maryland; Eastern Shore of Virginia; Delaware

Languages
- Nanticoke

Religion
- Native

Related ethnic groups
- Chincoteague, Pocomoke

The Assateague (meaning: "swifly moving water") were an Algonquian people speaking the Nanticoke language who historically lived on the Atlantic coast side of the Delmarva Peninsula (known during the colonial period as the Eastern Shores of Maryland and Virginia, and the Lower Counties of Pennsylvania).

While there are living people who may have distant heritage from this tribe, including some citizens of the Six Nations of the Grand River, the tribe itself no longer exists as a culturally intact tribal community.

== Culture ==
The Indigenous Assateague culture was based on the maritime and forest resources of the Chincoteague Bay watershed and, among other things, involved the manufacture and trade of shell beads.

Historically, the Assateague practiced excarnation as part of their funerary rites. This involved the eventual storing of ancestors' bones on shelves in a log structure. Periodically, the remains were collected and buried in a common grave or ossuary. Several ossuaries have been discovered on the Eastern Shore of Maryland.

== Historical relations with Europeans ==
=== Treaty of 1662 ===
In 1662, the English colony of Maryland made a treaty with the Assateagues (and the Nanticokes) whereby each colonist given land in the territory of the Assateagues would give the Assateague tribal chief (or "emperor", as he was inaccurately referred to by the colonists) six matchcoats (garments made of a rough blanket or frieze, heavy rough cloth with uncut nap on one side), and one matchcoat for every runaway slave the Assateague returned to their enslaver. The treaty further stated that no murders were to be committed by either side, that no English colonist was to enter Assateague territory without a pass, and that the Assateagues were not to trade with Dutch colonists in Delaware, as long as Maryland could supply their necessities.

Of several other treaties signed between the colonial government and the Assateagues before the close of the 17th century, one ordered the Assateagues onto five reservations along the Pocomoke River, and was signed by Amonugus, as Emperor of the "Assateagues". Apparently, based on signatures to a 1678 treaty, the "Emperor of the Assateagues" held a dominant position over the chiefs (or "kings", as subordinate to the "emperor") of the Chincoteague and Pocomoke tribes. Sessions of the Maryland General Assembly during this period record numerous complaints by the Assateague against colonists letting their cattle roam Assateague cornfields, breaking Assateague wild animal traps, cutting their timber, and encroaching on their lands. The Assateagues complained in 1686 that several colonists had even built homes in Assateagues' settlements.

=== Treaty of 1722 ===
In 1722, a peace treaty was signed between the then-leader of the Assateagues, Knosulm (also known as M. Walker); the "King of the Pocomokes", Wassounge (also known as Daniel); and Charles Calvert, the governor of Maryland. This treaty was to last to the "worlds end," and hostilities and damages from former acts would be "buried in perpetual oblivion," with further terms as follows:

- Any Indian who killed a colonist was to be brought to the governor as a prisoner.
- Because the colonists claimed to be unable to distinguish one Indian from another, no Indian was to enter a colonial settlement with his face painted or carrying a weapon, or even to approach a settlement without laying down his weapons or calling out to identify himself.
- The punishment for a colonist killing an Indian that came un-painted, called out, and laid down his arms was death.
- If an Indian and a colonists met accidentally in the woods, the former had to immediately lay down his weapons: if he did not, he would considered hostile.
- The privilege of crabbing, fowling, hunting and fishing would be granted to each Indian individually by the colonial government.
- Any Indian that killed or stole a hog, calf or other domestic animal, or stole any other goods would be punished the same way that a colonist would.
- Slaves and indentured servants who ran away from their masters and took shelter in Assateague territory were to be returned to the nearest colonial settlement for a reward.
- The Indians were not to sign any new peace treaties with an enemy of the governor, nor make war without his consent.
- If the Assateagues and Pocomokes killed any Indian subject to the governor's protection, it would be considered as great an offense as killing a colonist.
- Foreign Indians coming into the area were to be reported immediately to a prominent colonist or colonial official.

For the expected protection the Indians were to receive from the governor, the Assateagues and Pocomokes were to deliver unto the Proprietor of Maryland two bows and two dozen arrows yearly on 10 October.

=== Askiminokonson ===
As part of an attempt by the colonial authorities of Maryland to confine the local Indian population, several peninsular tribes (including the Assateague and Pocomoke from the Atlantic side, the Annamessex and Manokin from the Chesapeake Bay side, and the Nassawaddox from further south), were gathered at a single settlement, referred to Indian Town (or Indiantown) by the colonists and Askiminokonson by the Indians. By 1671, it was the largest Indian settlement in Maryland, and was made part of a reservation in 1686. Askiminokonson was located on the north side of the Pocomoke River near present-day Snow Hill, Maryland.

In 1742, unusual movements by the Indians created concern among the colonists, and investigation revealed that several chiefs had been involved in a plot for a general uprising planned by a Shawnee chief, Messowan. The Maryland colonial government dissolved the Assateague's "empire", made the title of Emperor merely honorary, and placed each town directly under provincial authority. Much agitation for the permission to emigrate followed, and by the end of the decade a large part of the Assateagues had moved to the Susquehanna region and become tributaries to the Iroquois. This group moved slowly northward, and their descendants are now in Ontario, Canada. Of those who stayed in Maryland, one group lived on the Choptank reserve until 1798. Another remnant of the tribe, retaining little of its native culture, survived near the Indian River in Delaware.
