= Mount Zion One Room School =

Mt. Zion One Room School
- Interactive map of the Mt. Zion One Room School area

General information
- Location: Ironshire Street at intersection with Church Street; Snow Hill, Maryland, United States
- Coordinates: 38°10′18″N 75°23′33″W
- Completed: 1869

Technical details
- Size: One room

The Mt. Zion One Room School is a historic U.S. school until November 2015 located at Ironshire Street at intersection with Church Street, Snow Hill, Maryland when it was moved by the Worcester County Historical Society to the Furnace Town Living Heritage Museum located on Old Furnace Road off Route 12, 5 miles North of Snow Hill, Maryland. The community used this one room school until 1931.

== Mt. Zion One Room School Museum ==
The Mt. Zion One Room School Museum preserved how a school looked during the early 20th century by showcasing typical items found in a classroom during that period.
