= Debedeavon =

Leader of the Accawmack people

- Esmy Shichans, Okiawampe, Johnson
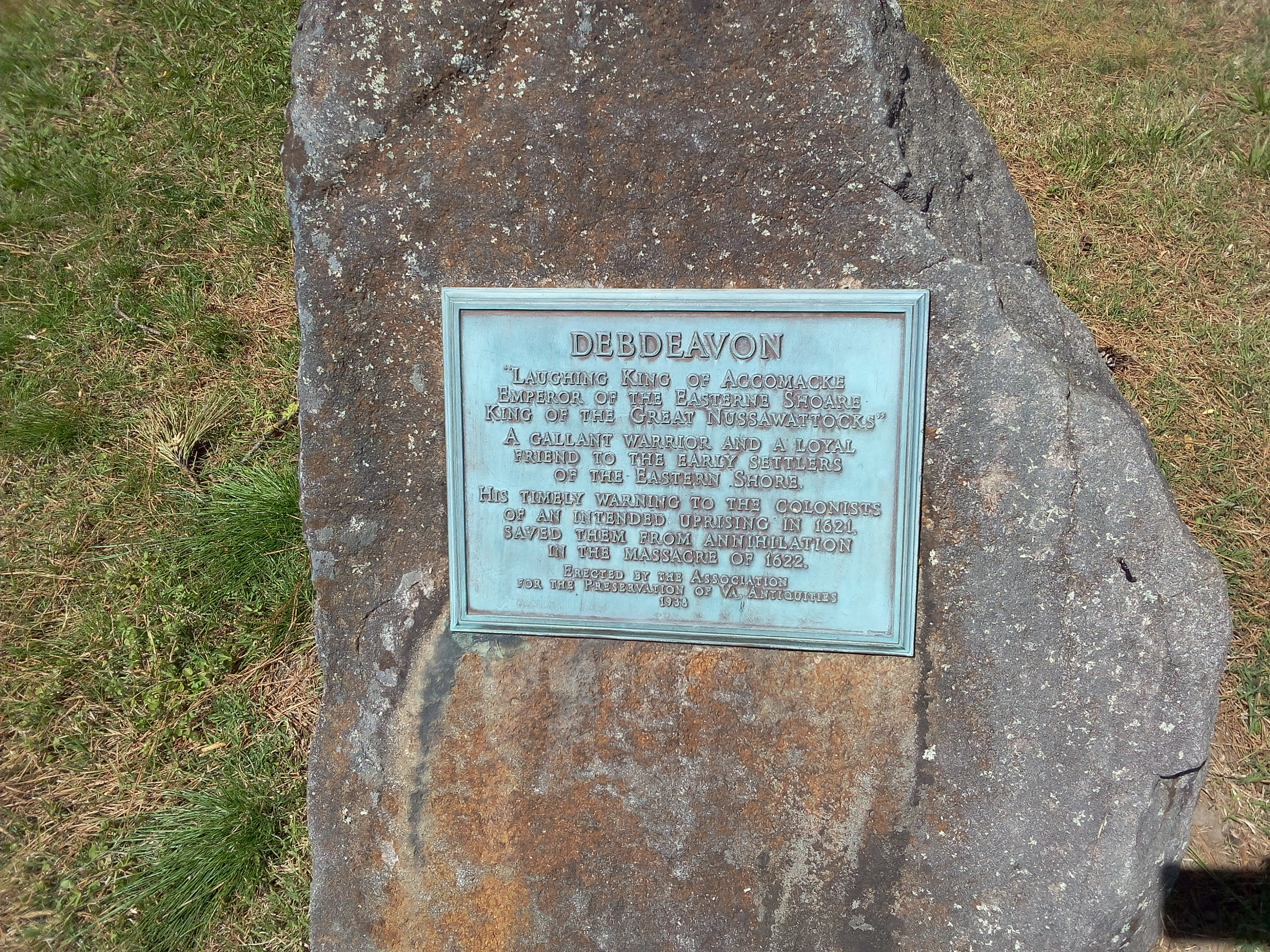
- Debedeavon Monument at Northampton Virginia Courthouse

Accawmack leader

Personal details
- Died: 1657
- Relations: Brother, Kiptopeke; daughter, Mary

Debedeavon (died 1657) was the chief ruler of the Accawmack people who lived on the Eastern Shore of Virginia upon the first arrival of English colonists in 1608. His title was recorded as "Ye Emperor of Ye Easterne Shore and King of Ye Great Nussawattocks," and he was also known familiarly as "the Laughing King". He also seems to be the same figure who was known variously in English records as Esmy Shichans, Okiawampe and Johnson.

== Background ==
The Accawmack, who numbered about 2,000, were peripheral or nominal members of the Powhatan Confederacy. However, since water isolated them from Tsenacommacah (the lands across the Chesapeake Bay), the Eastern Shore Indians had their own confederacy enjoying some measure of autonomy and peaceful rule under king Debedeavon. Each of his clan subchiefs paid him 8 bushels of corn, plus three arrowheads, as tribute each year.

In 1608, a 13-year-old English ensign named Thomas Savage was traded to Chief Powhatan for a Native boy, Nemotacke, as something like a cultural exchange student. Powhatan adopted Savage, who became an interpreter between the two cultures, but the jealousy of that Chief's brother eventually led Savage to be sent to the relatively safer Eastern Shore, where Debedeavon gave him a large tract of land between Cheriton Creek and King's Creek that became known as Savage's Neck, under his son John Savage (1624–1667; Thomas having married emigrant Hannah Tyng in 1621). Indeed, during the starving time at Jamestown, Debedeavon sold the colonists much needed provisions.

In 1621, the English colonists had spread along the peninsula from what had been their settlement on Plantation Creek. In 1621, Thomas Savage and Debedeavon warned the visiting Governor George Yeardley that Powhaton's tribe was plotting for a general uprising against Jamestown and the other colonists. The Governor was incredulous but went to all the plantations and held musters despite Opechancanough's denial of any conspiracy. Those steps, however, led to sufficient defense that the colony was not annihilated in the Indian massacre of 1622. Moreover, Lady Elizabeth Dale, widow of Thomas Dale, left the western shore which was suffering from an epidemic (foul distemper), with 20 people including 8 boys who thus survived the massacres on her plantation under Debedeavon's benevolent protection, so by 1623 about 80 settlers lived on the eastern shore.

== Later life ==
In his later years, Debedeavon devoted himself to the pleasures of hunting, leaving much of the business of government to his brother and Prime Minister, Kiptopeke. Indeed, when some prowling Indians up the coast killed an Englishman and boy, Debedeavon sent peace ambassadors, which Col. Obedience Robins refused to use as human sacrifices, but instead sent back, although Daniel Cugley, who had married the widowed Hannah Tyng, set them to work on his plantation, which caused his arrest and being sent to Jamestown for trial. Furthermore, when a quarrelsome settler pointed a gun at Debedeavon, the Accawmacke shire Court (Capt. Edmun Scarburgh, Justice of the Peace) ordered "that for any future tyme, noe Englishman shall disturb, molest, or act anything ag'st the sd Indyan King to hindr him in his huntinge, as they will answer the same.

== Death and legacy ==
In his will dated April 22, 1657, recorded at the county courthouse, Debedeavon left the kingdom to his daughter cautioning her as "Empress" to maintain the good will of their English friends. Mary, the daughter of Debedeavon, was declared "empress" by the governor in January 1674 and is probably the empress referred to by Beverley in 1705.

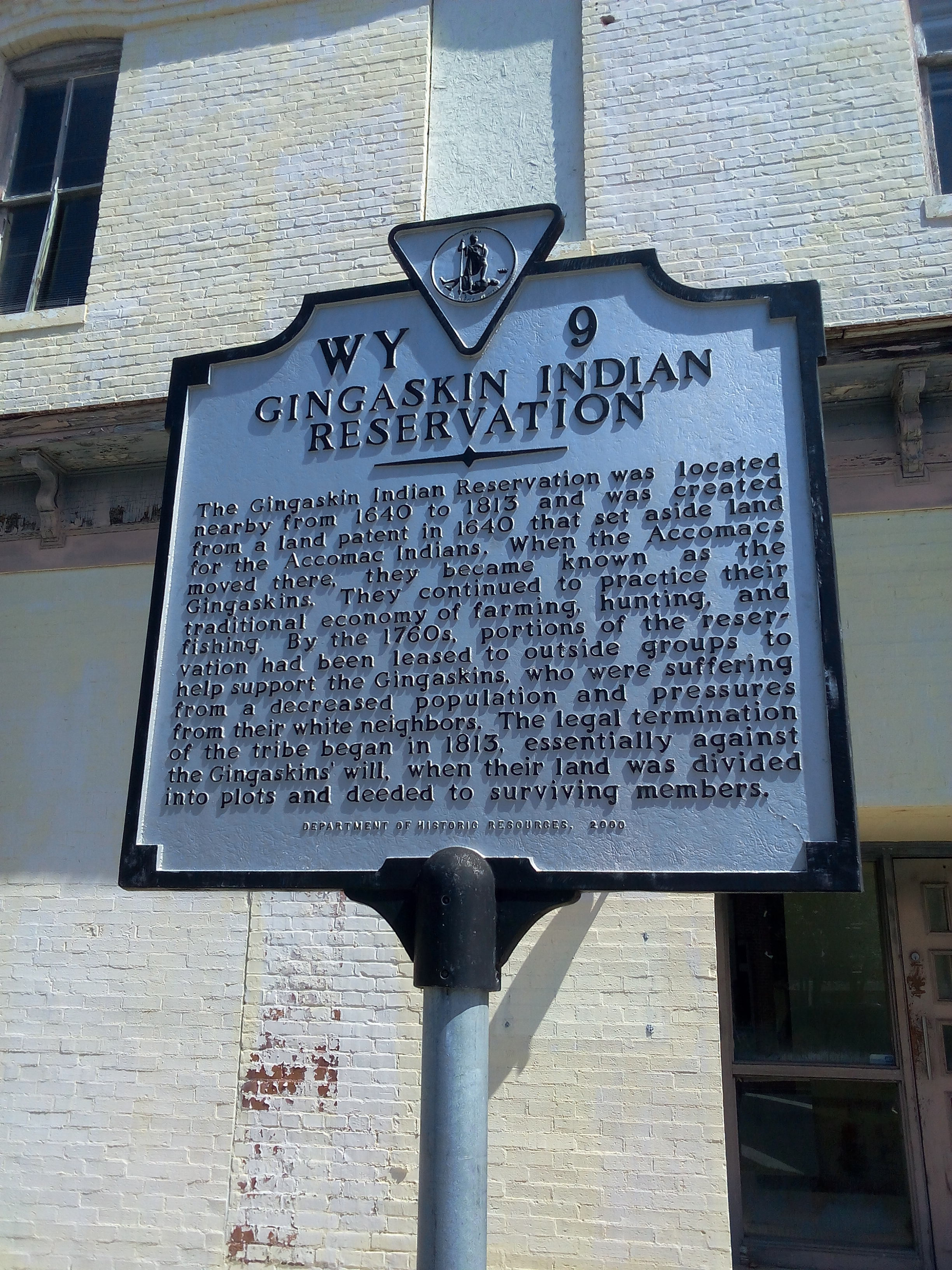

The historic Court House Square in Eastville, Virginia has a monument to "DEBEDEAVON, A Gallant Warrior And A Loyal Friend To The Early Settlers Of The Eastern Shore." Also, Virginia recently erected a historical marker across the street from the Debedeavon monument and old courthouse, remembering the Gingakin Indian Reservation, which his tribe occupied for the next 150 years. In 1705, Robert Beverley noted that the “Indians of Virginia are almost wasted, but such Towns, or People as retain their Names, and live in Bodies, are hereunder set down; all which together can't raise five hundred fighting men. They live poorly and much in fear of the neighboring Indians. Each town, by the articles of peace, 1677, pays three Indian arrows for their land, and twenty beaver skins for protection every year." He continued to say, they had eight towns in Accomac, the largest of which was in Northampton, where the Gangascoe (Gingaskins) are "almost as numerous as all the foregoing put together," and they still held land in common as late as 1812, but they were "driven off during the excitement subsequent to the Nat Turner Insurrection."

== Controversy ==
Debedeavon can be 4 different people:

1. Esmy Shichans, also known as the Laughing King
2. Okiawampe, also spelled Wackawamp
3. Tapatiapon or Debedeavon
4. Johnson

However, Debedeavon is considered to be the same person as Johnson by Fausz and the Laughing King by Upshur. Also, Okiawampe may have been the same person as Debedeavon.

== Timeline of name variants in English records (incomplete) ==
- 1608 - Capt. Smith records that Debedeavon is ruling Accowmacke, pop. 2000
- 1620 - Debedeavon grants large tracts to Thomas Savage and to Governor George Yeardley.
- 1635 - Patent to Thomas Savage's widow Hannah "by the King of the Easterne shoare as by deed calling himselfe Esmy Schichans."
- 1648 - Richard Vaughan buys tract from "Debbedeaven, king of Nandue."
- 1650 - Edmund Scarburgh, Jr. buys 2000 acres from Okiawampe, "great Kinge of the Easterne Shore."
- 1653 - Dr. George Hack buys 1000 acres from "Tepitiason, King of great Nuswattocks"
- 1657 - "Deabedanba, Kinge of great nusangs" gives 100 acres to Joan Johnson
- 1657 - Will of Okiawampe
- 1663 - Thomas Leatherbury buys 1200 acres from "Tapatiapon, great Emperor of the Eastern Shore" for three matchcoats.
