= Julia A. Purnell Museum =

Local history museum in Snow Hill, Maryland, United States

Coordinates: 38°10′32″N 75°23′49″W

- Established: 1957
- Location: 208 West Market Street; Snow Hill, Maryland
- Type: History
- Website: Julia A. Purnell Museum

The Julia A. Purnell Museum is located at 208 West Market Street, Snow Hill, Maryland, United States. The building that houses the museum was originally the St. Agnes Catholic Church built in 1891. The museum exhibits over 500 years of local history.

The museum is named after Snow Hill resident Julia A. Purnell. She was born in 1843 as Julia Anne LeCompte. She was known for her needlework pieces, making over 1,000 pieces during her 80s and 90s. Many of her pieces depicted homes, churches, and gardens in Snow Hill. Purnell died in 1943, just after her 100th birthday.

In 1942, Purnell's son William opened the Julia Purnell Museum in a building on the property of his home in Snow Hill. This museum displayed some of his mother's needlework pieces. In 1957, the museum collection was moved to its current home at the old St. Agnes Catholic Church.

In addition to Julia Purnell's needlework pieces, the museum houses some oddities collected by William including miniature fleas, as well as other items connected to early Snow Hill and Worcester County life.
