= Pocomoke Indian Nation =

Cultural nonprofit organizations in Maryland

- Named after: Pocomoke people
- Formation: 2011
- Founded at: Eden, Maryland
- Type: nonprofit organization
- Tax ID no.: EIN 45-5041803
- Purpose: Ethnic/Immigrant Services (P84)
- Headquarters: Eden, Maryland
- Location: United States
- Official language: English
- Principal officer: Norris C. Howard Sr.
- Website: pocomokeindiannation.org

The Pocomoke Indian Nation is a cultural heritage organization of individuals who identify as descendants of the Pocomoke people. They formed a nonprofit organization, the Pocomoke Indian Nation, Inc., in Eden, Maryland.

The Pocomoke Indian Nation is an unrecognized organization. Despite having the word "nation" in their name, this organization is neither a federally recognized tribe nor a state-recognized tribe.

== Nonprofit organization ==
The Pocomoke Indian Nation, Inc. registered as nonprofit corporation in 2011. Norris C. Howard Sr. of Eden, Maryland is the registered agent. He uses the title "paramount chief."

== Activities ==
Norris Howard Sr. and his son "Buddy" Howard have fought against state recognition of the Accohannock Indian Tribe, based in Marion Station, Maryland.

The Community Foundation of the Eastern Shore donated a $5,000 grant to the Pocomoke Indian Nation in 2015 to support its educational, outreach, and marketing programs. Members provide living history demonstrations and storytelling. For example, the group has provided programming for the Delmarva Discovery Museum in Pocomoke City, Maryland.

== See also ==
- List of organizations that self-identify as Native American tribes
