= USS Pocomoke (SP-265) =

Minesweeper of the United States Navy

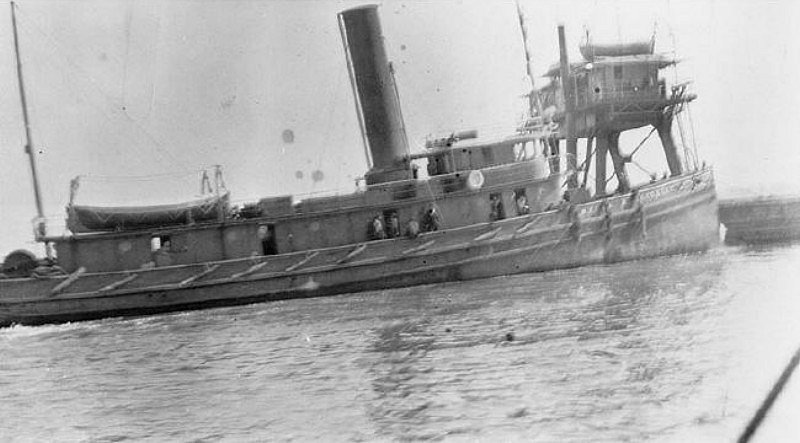
- Pocomoke during or before 1918.

History

United States
- Name: USS Pocomoke
- Namesake: Pocomoke City, Maryland (previous name retained)
- Completed: 1902
- Acquired: 8 June 1917
- Commissioned: 29 June 1917
- Reclassified: From section patrol craft (SP-265) to district harbor tug (YT-43) 17 July 1920
- Fate: Sold 2 May 1922
- Notes: Operated as civilian tug Pocomoke 1902-1917

General characteristics
- Type: Minesweeper and tug
- Displacement: 139 tons
- Length: 115 ft (35 m)
- Beam: 18 ft 5 in (5.61 m)
- Draft: 8 ft 6 in (2.59 m)
- Propulsion: Steam engine, one shaft
- Speed: 9 knots
- Armament: 2 × 1-pounder guns

The second USS Pocomoke (SP-265), later YT-43, was a United States Navy minesweeper and tug commissioned in 1917 and sold in 1922.

Pocomoke was built as a civilian tug of the same name in 1902 at Pocomoke City, Maryland. The U.S. Navy purchased her from her owner, the Menhaden Products Company of Newport, Rhode Island, on 8 June 1917 for World War I service as a minesweeper. She was commissioned on 29 June 1917 as USS Pocomoke (SP-265).

During 1918 Pocomoke was assigned to the 2nd Naval District in southern New England. She operated off the United States West Coast and Mexico in 1919. On 17 July 1920 was classified as a district harbor tug and redesignated YT–43.

Pocomoke was sold at San Francisco, California, on 2 May 1922.

Pocomoke should not be confused with USS Pocomoke (SP-571), a patrol vessel also in commission during World War I.
