= Snow Hill, Maryland =

- Town
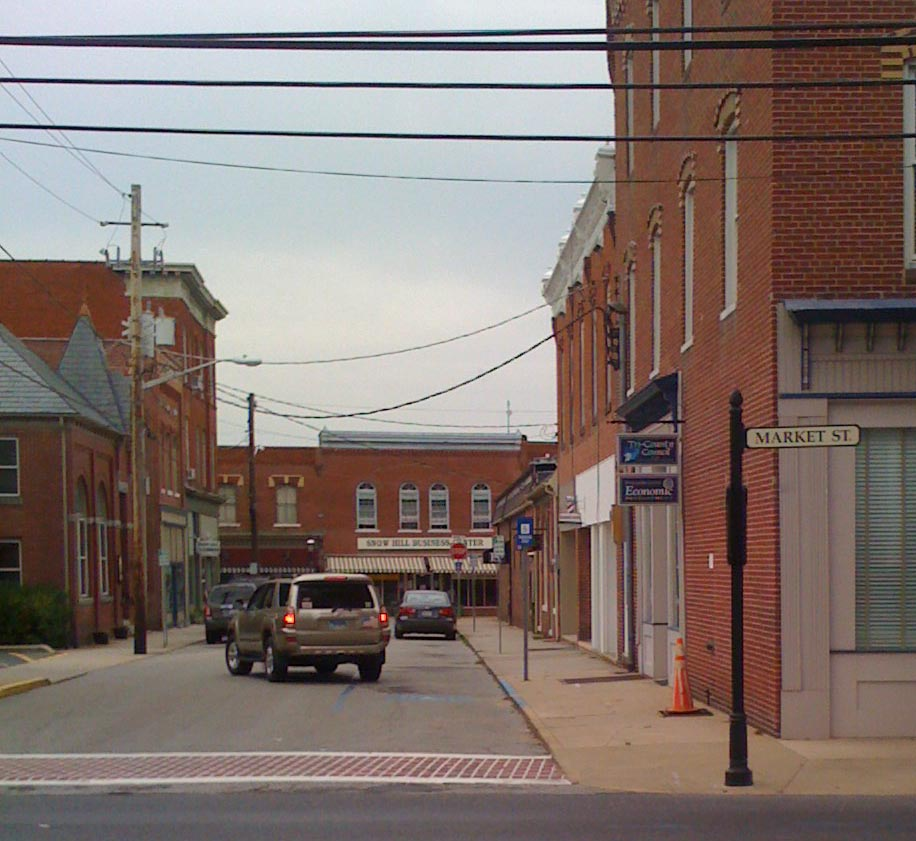

- Flag Logo

- Location in Worcester County and Maryland

- Location in Maryland Snow Hill (the United States)
- Coordinates: 38°10′30″N 75°23′27″W
- Country: United States
- State: Maryland
- County: Worcester
- Incorporated: 1812

Government
  - Mayor: Zoe Yurek
  - Town Council: Member List Jacob Culver, Meyer Evans, Vegas Von Marsh, Carlton Littleton, Jason Perdue: Jenny Hall; Alison Cook; LaToya Purnell

Area
  - Total: 1.56 sq mi (4.04 km^{2})
  - Land: 1.48 sq mi (3.83 km^{2})
  - Water: 0.081 sq mi (0.21 km^{2})
- Elevation: 16 ft (5 m)

Population
  - Total: 2,293
  - Density: 1,456.6/sq mi (562.41/km^{2})
- Time zone: UTC-5 (Eastern (EST))
  - Summer (DST): UTC-4 (EDT)
- ZIP code: 21863
- Area codes: 410, 443, 667
- FIPS code: 24-73075
- GNIS feature ID: 0587416
- Website: www.snowhillmd.gov

Snow Hill is a town serving as the county seat of Worcester County, Maryland, United States. The population was 2,156 at the 2020 census making it the fourth most populated incorporated municipality in Worcester County. It is part of the Salisbury, Maryland-Delaware Metropolitan Statistical Area.

== History ==
The area which constitutes modern-day Snow Hill was inhabited by the Pocomoke people prior to the arrival of European settlers. The Askiminikansen Reservation was established approximately one mile northwest of Snow Hill in 1678. The reservation had a population of roughly 120 Pocomoke and Assateague until its abandonment in 1756.

Colonel William Stevens patented the plot of land from which downtown Snow Hill currently stands in 1669 or 1676 depending on the source. The plot was initially intended to be a tobacco plantation but was sold to Ann Bishop, wife of Henry Bishop who intended to purchase the plot before his untimely death. The purchase occurred on December 23, 1985.

Snow Hill was first chartered on October 26, 1686 in Somerset County by English settlers making it the oldest chartered town within the current boundaries of Worcester County. The town's name is likely inspired by a street and neighborhood in the City of London called "Snow Hill".

Snow Hill was made a port of entry in 1694. Snow Hill merchants made important trade connections with England and Barbados in the late 17th and early 18th centuries. The port's freight steadily increased until 1837 when nearby Pocomoke City split a significant share of the total freight flowing along the Pocomoke River. The town developed a commercial center by 1707.

In 1742, Worcester County was carved out of the eastern half of old Somerset County and Snow Hill, centrally located in the new county and at the head of navigation on the Pocomoke River, was made the county seat.

Food processing industries emerged in Snow Hill during the 1860s with the establishment of a fruit drying plant along with multiple canneries and mills. A brickyard and the Nassawango Iron Furnace were constructed during this period. The latter was constructed in 1830. It was one of only two iron furnaces on the Eastern Shore and one of the first furnaces to use the hot-blast technique in the United States. The Nassawango Iron Furnace closed in 1849 but sustained a small village after its closure.

Major fires in 1843 and 1893 destroyed the center of Snow Hill, including two successive court houses, but some 18th-century structures survived both fires. Most of the city's records were destroyed in the 1893 fire. Following the second fire, the commercial district was rebuilt predominantly of brick and stone structures. The Snow Hill Historic District, which includes approximately 80% of the town, was created in 2004.

In December 2010, a Snow Hill businessman started a petition to remove the town's incorporation and revert the area to county control. The reasons given were lower county taxes, better services provided to the town, and a need for revitalization. The push was abandoned in January 2011.

The All Hallows Episcopal Church, Chanceford, Old Friendship United Methodist Church, Samuel Gunn House, Makemie Memorial Presbyterian Church, James Martin House, Nassawango Iron Furnace Site, Nun's Green, George Washington Purnell House, and Gov. John Walter Smith House are listed on the National Register of Historic Places.

== Geography ==
Snow Hill is located at 38°10′30″N 75°23′27″W (38.175024, -75.390738).

According to the United States Census Bureau, the town has a total area of 3.12 square miles (8.08 km^{2}), of which 3.01 square miles (7.80 km^{2}) is land and 0.11 square miles (0.28 km^{2}) is water.

== Demographics ==
Historical population
Census	Pop.	Note	%±
1850	714		—
1860	966		35.3%
1870	960		−0.6%
1880	1,276		32.9%
1890	1,483		16.2%
1900	1,596		7.6%
1910	1,844		15.5%
1920	1,684		−8.7%
1930	1,604		−4.8%
1940	1,926		20.1%
1950	2,091		8.6%
1960	2,311		10.5%
1970	2,201		−4.8%
1980	2,192		−0.4%
1990	2,217		1.1%
2000	2,409		8.7%
2010	2,103		−12.7%
2020	2,156		2.5%
U.S. Decennial Census

=== 2020 census ===
As of the 2020 census, Snow Hill had a population of 2,156. The median age was 42.0 years. 23.3% of residents were under the age of 18 and 22.0% of residents were 65 years of age or older. For every 100 females there were 84.3 males, and for every 100 females age 18 and over there were 74.7 males age 18 and over.

0.0% of residents lived in urban areas, while 100.0% lived in rural areas.

There were 878 households in Snow Hill, of which 31.7% had children under the age of 18 living in them. Of all households, 35.6% were married-couple households, 14.9% were households with a male householder and no spouse or partner present, and 42.3% were households with a female householder and no spouse or partner present. About 32.2% of all households were made up of individuals and 16.6% had someone living alone who was 65 years of age or older.

There were 1,024 housing units, of which 14.3% were vacant. The homeowner vacancy rate was 2.0% and the rental vacancy rate was 10.7%.

Racial composition as of the 2020 census
Race	Number	Percent
White	1,255	58.2%
Black or African American	681	31.6%
American Indian and Alaska Native	0	0.0%
Asian	35	1.6%
Native Hawaiian and Other Pacific Islander	0	0.0%
Some other race	28	1.3%
Two or more races	157	7.3%
Hispanic or Latino (of any race)	65	3.0%

=== 2010 census ===
As of the census of 2010, there were 2,103 people, 871 households, and 557 families residing in the town. The population density was 698.7 inhabitants per square mile (269.8/km^{2}). There were 1,005 housing units at an average density of 333.9 per square mile (128.9/km^{2}). The racial makeup of the town was 57.0% White, 39.0% African American, 0.2% Native American, 1.3% Asian, 0.3% from other races, and 2.2% from two or more races. Hispanic or Latino of any race were 1.6% of the population.

There were 871 households, of which 31.3% had children under the age of 18 living with them, 36.7% were married couples living together, 21.9% had a female householder with no husband present, 5.3% had a male householder with no wife present, and 36.1% were non-families. 32.0% of all households were made up of individuals, and 16% had someone living alone who was 65 years of age or older. The average household size was 2.32 and the average family size was 2.90.

The median age in the town was 44.7 years. 23.2% of residents were under the age of 18; 7.9% were between the ages of 18 and 24; 19.3% were from 25 to 44; 29.4% were from 45 to 64; and 20.2% were 65 years of age or older. The gender makeup of the town was 45.9% male and 54.1% female.

=== 2000 census ===
As of the census of 2000, there were 2,409 people, 862 households, and 555 families residing in the town. The population density was 1,806.2 inhabitants per square mile (697.4/km^{2}). There were 964 housing units at an average density of 722.8 per square mile (279.1/km^{2}). The racial makeup of the town was 56.00% White, 42.34% African American, 0.08% Native American, 0.58% Asian, 0.04% Pacific Islander, 0.37% from other races, and 0.58% from two or more races. Hispanic or Latino of any race were 1.08% of the population.

There were 862 households, out of which 28.3% had children under the age of 18 living with them, 40.6% were married couples living together, 20.2% had a female householder with no husband present, and 35.5% were non-families. 31.4% of all households were made up of individuals, and 15.7% had someone living alone who was 65 years of age or older. The average household size was 2.37 and the average family size was 2.94.

In the town, the population was spread out, with 21.0% under the age of 18, 9.3% from 18 to 24, 29.6% from 25 to 44, 20.5% from 45 to 64, and 19.5% who were 65 years of age or older. The median age was 39 years. For every 100 females, there were 99.4 males. For every 100 females age 18 and over, there were 95.5 males.

The median income for a household in the town was $29,730, and the median income for a family was $38,657. Males had a median income of $25,439 versus $20,625 for females. The per capita income for the town was $15,560. About 14.8% of families and 15.9% of the population were below the poverty line, including 19.5% of those under age 18 and 13.1% of those age 65 or over.

== Education ==
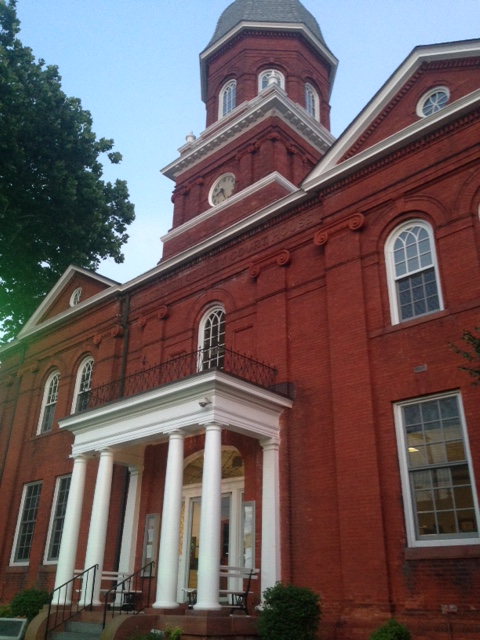
Worcester County Courthouse in Snow Hill.

Snow Hill is the location of:

- Snow Hill Elementary School
- Snow Hill Middle School
- Snow Hill High School
- Cedar Chapel Special School

== Religion ==
A number of Protestant religious denominations have churches in Snow Hill; several are listed on the National Register of Historic Places:

- All Hallows Episcopal Church
- Makemie Memorial Presbyterian Church
- Bates Memorial United Methodist Church
- Whatcoat United Methodist Church
- Ebenezer United Methodist Church
- Snow Hill Christian Church
- Liberty Church on the Rock Ministries
- Old School Baptist Church
- Mt. Zion Baptist Church
- Hutt's Memorial United Methodist Church

== Notable people ==
- Fannie Birckhead (1935–2022), interim mayor of Snow Hill in 1998
- Janeen L. Birckhead, military official serving as the adjutant general of Maryland since 2023
- Arch Johnson, stage, film, and television actor died in Snow Hill in 1997.
- Judy Johnson, was a player in the Negro Baseball Leagues and later a scout in the major leagues. In 1975, Johnson was inducted into the Baseball Hall of Fame. He was born William Julius "Judy" Johnson in Snow Hill on October 26, 1900.
- Sherron Mills, professional basketball player, 1971-2016
- John Walter Smith, Congressman for Maryland 1st District, 1899–1900; 44th Governor of Maryland, 1900–1904; U.S. Senator, 1907-1919. Born in Snow Hill on February 5, 1845.
- Ben Tate, NFL running back, who attended Snow Hill HS during his senior year in 2006; led team to the Maryland state championship game.
- R. V. Truitt, first lacrosse coach at the University of Maryland, 1919–1927. Founder of the Chesapeake Biological Laboratory in Solomons, Maryland (1925), now part of the University of Maryland Center for Environmental Science. World renowned marine ecologist who studied blue crab and oyster.
- Ephraim King Wilson II, U.S. Senator, 1885–1891; Congressman for Maryland 1st District, 1873-1874. Born in Snow Hill on December 22, 1821.

== In popular culture ==
In 1999, some scenes of the film Runaway Bride (starring Julia Roberts and Richard Gere) were shot at the Snow Hill High School. The scenes at the baseball and football games were filmed behind the school.

At the end of each episode of Adult Swim's Children Hospital is an old advertisement for The Corddry Co Snow Hill, MD. The lead actor, writer, and producer is comedian Rob Corddry, whose father is from Snow Hill. He uses the advertisement as his production banner.

== See also ==
- Julia A. Purnell Museum
- Furnace Town Living Heritage Museum
- Mt. Zion One Room School
