= USS Pocomoke (SP-571) =

Patrol vessel of the United States Navy

History

United States
- Name: USS Pocomoke, later USS SP-571
- Namesake: As Pocomoke, for Pocomoke City, Maryland (Previous name retained); As SP-571, for her section patrol number
- Builder: Brewster Brothers, Baltimore, Maryland
- Commissioned: 24 April 1917
- Fate: Returned to owner 22 October 1918
- Notes: Operated as civilian freight boat Pocomoke until 1917 and from 1918

General characteristics
- Type: Patrol vessel
- Tonnage: 23 tons
- Length: 64 ft 7 in (19.69 m)
- Beam: 20 ft 3 in (6.17 m)
- Draft: 5 ft (1.5 m)
- Armament: 1 × 1-pounder gun

The first USS Pocomoke (SP-571), later USS SP-571, was a United States Navy patrol vessel in commission from 1917 to 1918.

Pocomoke was built as a civilian freight boat of the same name by Brewster Brothers at Baltimore, Maryland. The U.S. Navy acquired her from her owner, the Fish Commission of the Commonwealth of Virginia, in 1917 for World War I service as a patrol vessel. She was commissioned on 24 April 1917 as USS Pocomoke (SP-571).

Pocomoke operated on section patrol duty for the rest of World War I.

The Navy returned Pocomoke to the Fish Commission on 22 October 1918.

Pocomoke should not be confused with USS Pocomoke (SP-265), a minesweeper also in commission during World War I.
