= Askiminokonson =

Askiminokonson Askiminikansen
- Settlement
- Nickname: Indian Town
- Interactive map of Askiminokonson
- Coordinates: 38.2°N 75.4°W
- Country: United States
- State: Maryland
- County: Worcester

Askiminokonson, called Indian Town by English settlers, was a Native American settlement in Maryland. Askiminokonson was first settled by Native Americans around 1666. It was inhabited by the Pocomoke, Annamessex, Manokin, Nasswattex, and Acquintica Native American tribes. It was the largest Native American settlement in Maryland in 1671, and was incorporated into another reservation in 1686. Askiminokoson was located just north of the Pocomoke River, near present-day Snow Hill, Maryland. Askiminokoson was mentioned in the proceedings of the Council of Maryland (which became the Maryland General Assembly) in 1686 as part of a land dispute between settlers and Native Americans.

== See also ==
- Native American tribes in Maryland
