= Meyer Site =

- U.S. National Register of Historic Places
- Location within Maryland Location within the United States
- Location: 39°27′20″N 79°6′50″W
- Nearest city: Westernport, Maryland
- NRHP reference No.: 73000921
- Added to NRHP: June 19, 1973

The Meyer Site is an archaeological site near Westernport in Garrett County, Maryland, United States. It is located along Chestnut Grove Road on the riverside edge of an alluvial bottom on the west side of the North Branch of the Potomac River. It is the site of a Monongahela culture village, which is the uppermost Late Prehistoric village known on the North Branch.

It was listed on the National Register of Historic Places in 1973.
