= All Hallows Episcopal Church =

Historic church in Maryland, United States

- U.S. National Register of Historic Places
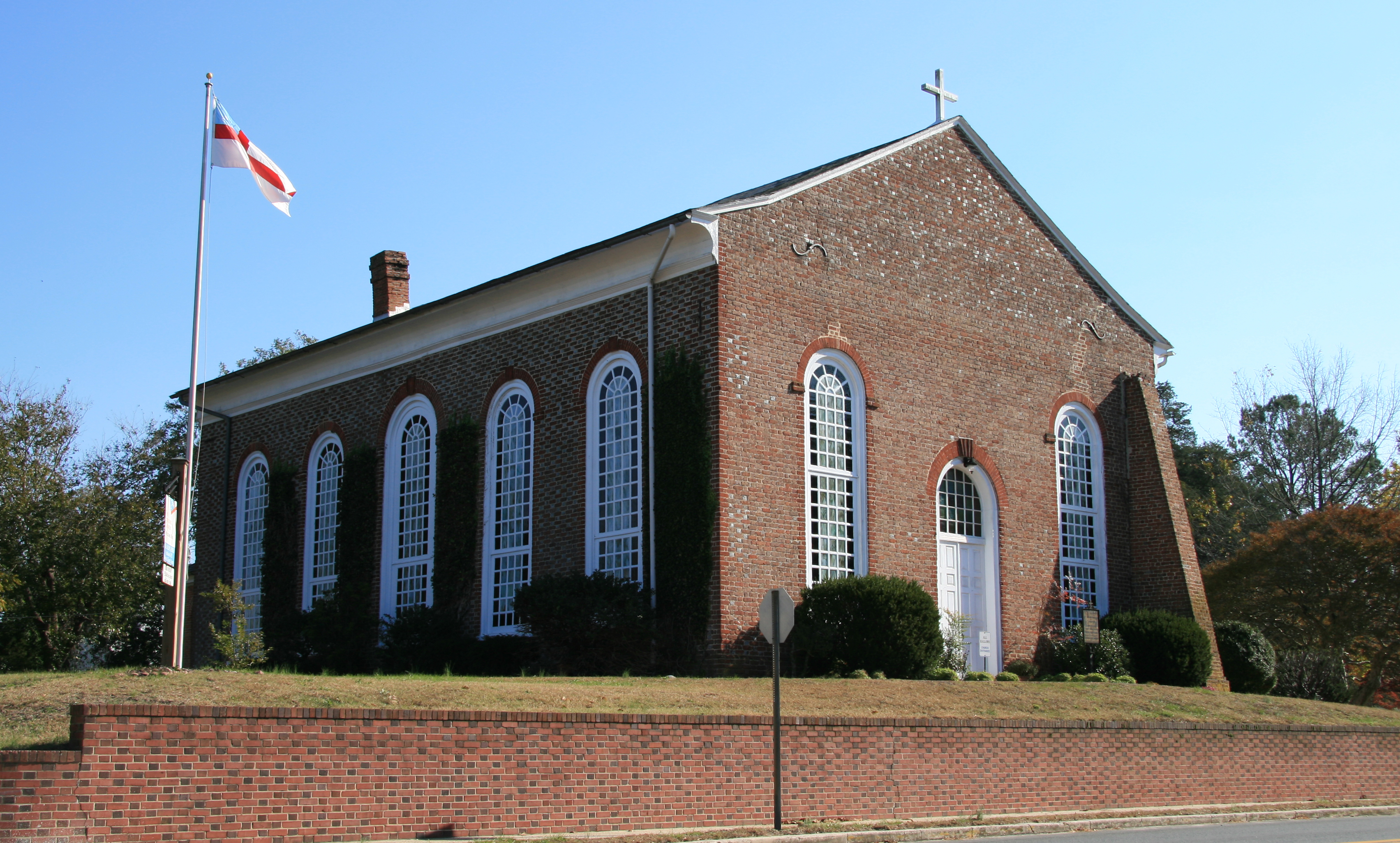

- Location within Maryland Location within the United States
- Location: 107 N. Church Street (MD 12), Snow Hill, Maryland
- Coordinates: 38°10′32.31″N 75°23′42.83″W
- Area: less than one acre
- Built: 1748 1756
- NRHP reference No.: 79001148
- Added to NRHP: August 6, 1979

The construction of All Hallows Episcopal Church, also known as All Hallows, Snow Hill, located at 109 West Market Street in Snow Hill, Maryland, was funded in 1748 by an act of the Maryland Colonial Assembly, which taxed tobacco for the church. Completed in 1756, it is an unusually elaborate building for its time and place. All Hallows Parish is one of the original 30 Anglican parishes in the Province of Maryland.

All Hallows Episcopal Church was added to the National Register of Historic Places in 1979.

It is still an active parish in the Episcopal Diocese of Easton. The Rev. Kenneth Thom is its current Supply Priest. The Rev. Charles Hatfield will be the Rector starting February 12, 2018.
