= Accomac Shire =

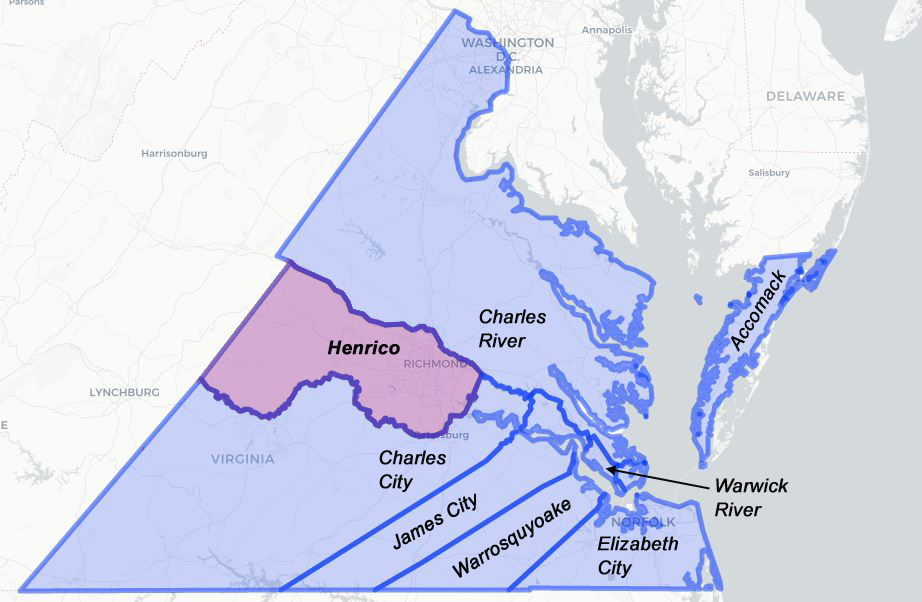
Map of the shires of Virginia, 1634

Accomac Shire was established in the Colony of Virginia by the House of Burgesses in 1634 under the direction of King Charles I. It was one of the original eight shires of Virginia. The shire's name comes from the Native American word "Accawmack".

In 1642, the name was changed to Northampton County by English colonists. In 1663, Northampton County was split into two counties that still exist. The northern two thirds took the original Accomac name, while the southern third remained as Northampton.

In 1670, the Virginia Colony's Royal Governor William Berkeley abolished Accomac County, but the Virginia General Assembly re-created it in 1671. In 1940, the General Assembly officially added a "k" to the end of the county's name to arrive at its current spelling, which is Accomack County.
