= Accohannock Indian Tribe =

State-recognized tribe in Maryland

Accohannock Indian Tribe, Inc.
- Named after: Accohannock people, American Indians
- Formation: 1995
- Type: state-recognized tribe (2017), nonprofit organization (1995)
- Tax ID no.: EIN 52-1877314
- Purpose: A23: Cultural, Ethnic Awareness
- Location: Marion Station, Maryland, United States
- Members: Fewer than 100 (2021)
- Official language: English
- Principal Officer: Rudolph Hall Sr.
- President: Pat Carson (2020)
- Revenue: $36,195 (2011)
- Expenses: $17,030 (2011)
- Funding: grants, contributions

The Accohannock Indian Tribe, Inc. is a state-recognized tribe in Maryland and a nonprofit organization of individuals who self-identify as descendants of the Accohannock people.

The Accohannock Indian Tribe is not federally recognized as a Native American tribe. The Maryland-based organization should not be confused with the American Indigenous Accawmacke Indians, an unrecognized nonprofit organization based in Cape Charles, Virginia.

The historic Accohannock people were an Eastern Algonquian–speaking tribe who lived on the Eastern Shore of Virginia. According to John R. Swanton they were a subdivision of the Powhatan.

== Organization ==
In 1995, the Accohannock Indian Tribe formed a 501(c)(3) nonprofit organization, based in Marion Station, Maryland. Rudy Hall served as their first chief. Clarence "Lone Wolf" Tyler served as a chief in 2018.

Jerry wimbrow is chairman of council

Their recent annual expenses were $506,148 and annual revenue was $547,939.

== State recognition ==
Maryland Governor Larry Hogan formally recognized this organization as a state-recognized tribe on December 19, 2017, through Executive Order 01.01.2017.31.

== Petition for federal recognition ==
On January 18, 1995, Rudy Hall in sent a letter of intent to petition for federal recognition on behalf of the Accohannock Indian Tribal Association, Inc. They have not followed up with a petition for federal recognition, however.

== Controversies ==
The group states that beginning in the late 17th century, Accohannock people purposefully intermarried with European settlers and successfully hid their Native American identity while maintaining their culture and clan structure for three centuries. "Indeed, the Tribe's retreat from public life persisted for nearly three hundred years, from approximately 1705 until in or around 1993."

The U.S. Department of Health and Human Services took steps to "enforce financial reporting requirements for the Accohannock Indian Tribe," after the group failed to file its financial report for 2009 after spending more than "$1 million in federal funds from three different federal programs". They received $500,000 (2007), $986,000 (2008), and $441,000 (2009) in direct federal funding.

In 2020, Accohannock Indian Tribe, Inc., et al. v. Hinman, 19-CV-20000075, filed in Somerset County, Maryland, the organization sued Michael J. Hinman, who had previously served as tribal chairman until he was voted out in June 2019. The plaintiffs accused Hinman of "ultra vires acts in violation of his fiduciary duties, including unilaterally disposing of tribal assets". The complaint said that Hinman refused to recognize the outcome of the 2019 election or to recognize the new leadership. Hinman alleged that the plaintiffs were allies of or members of "the Wolf Clan — an insurgent group of persons claiming indigenous, but not Accohannock descent — that had attempted to infiltrate the Tribe". The State trial court, hearing the case under Maryland corporate law, ruled in favor of the plaintiffs.

In 2021, the Accohannock Indian Tribe, the Accohannock Indian Tribes Inc., and Michael J. Hinman filed a lawsuit against Clarence Tyler, Jerry Wimbrow, Bill Tapman, Jean Laughman, Vivian Tyler, Sandi Ennis, Julie Gilroy, Kenny Gilroy, Diane Baldwin, and the Honorable Sidney S. Campen Jr., judge of the circuit court in Somerset County, Maryland for "alleged constitutional and statutory violations" and requested a restraining order. Their complaint was dismissed.

Hinman unsuccessfully tried to argue for tribal sovereign immunity for the organization, which both courts rejected. The case summary states: "Plaintiffs here cannot demonstrate continuity between the [current] Tribe and the historic Accohannock. Put differently, Plaintiffs fail to carry their burden of showing that the Tribe is a modern-day successor to, rather than a recreation of, a historic sovereign entity. ... [T]he Accohannock were fully assimilated into the general populations of Virginia and Maryland; its members lived amongst, and intermarried, with white settlers, and largely disclaiming any outward signifiers of their Indian identity." The summary continues, "Simply put, Plaintiffs' own evidence suggests that the Tribe is a reincarnation of the historic Accohannock, motivated in part by several members' recent discovery of their ethnicity and genealogy."

== Activities ==
The organization hosts "an annual cultural festival/pow wow and provide[s] educational demonstrations at schools within the eastern shore of Maryland public system, including colleges."
