= Choptank people =

Native American people

Choptank
Total population
- Extinct as a tribe

Regions with significant populations
- Eastern Shore of Maryland

Languages
- Nanticoke

Religion
- Native American religion

Related ethnic groups
- Nanticoke, Lenape

The Choptank (or Ababco (Note: Also Ababeve or Abapco.)) were an Algonquian-speaking Native American people that historically lived on the Eastern Shore of Maryland on the Delmarva Peninsula. They occupied an area along the lower Choptank River basin, which included parts of present-day Talbot, Dorchester and Caroline counties. They spoke Nanticoke, an Eastern Algonquian language closely related to Delaware. The Choptank were the only Indians on the Eastern Shore to be granted a reservation in fee simple by the English colonial government. The Choptank were a subdivision of the Nanticoke.

== History ==
The name Choptank is thought to be from the Nanticoke word tshapetank: a stream that separates, or place of big current.

The Algonquian-speaking Choptank were independent, but they were related in culture and language to the Nanticoke, a powerful country immediately to their south, which was dominant on the Eastern Shore.

The only Indian reservation which the English established in fee simple on the Eastern Shore was the Choptank Indian Reservation in 1669. The territory included what later became the city of Cambridge, the county seat of Dorchester County. The last town in Dorchester County occupied by the Choptank was Locust Neck Indian Town, which they left about 1790.

The U.S. Navy tugboat Choptank was named after the tribe. It served from 1918 until 1946. The towns of Choptank, Maryland, and Choptank Mills, Delaware, are named after the river. Fictional members of the tribe are characters in the early chapters of James Michener's 1978 novel, Chesapeake.

== See also ==
- Indigenous peoples of Maryland
