= Charles L. Carpenter =

American naval officer (1902–1992)

Charles Lorain Carpenter
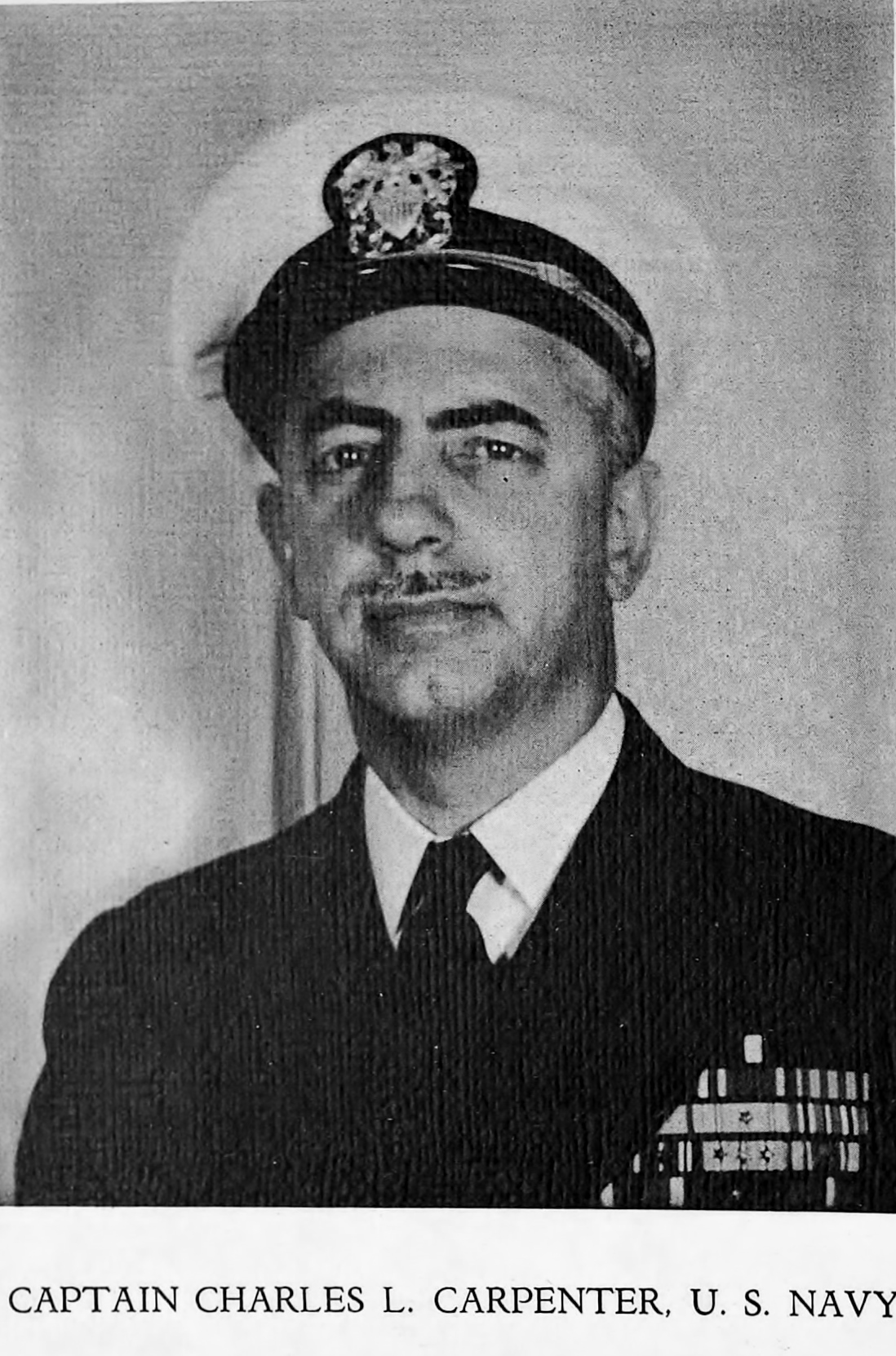
- Biographical photograph, taken 1952
- Born: July 31, 1902; Greensburg, Pennsylvania, US
- Died: February 21, 1992 (aged 89)
- Burial place: South Pine Grove Cemetery, South Waterboro, Maine
- Military career
- Allegiance: United States
- Branch: United States Navy
- Service years: 1926–1956
- Rank: Rear Admiral
- Nickname: "Charlie"
- Commands: USS Doran 1940; USS Freestone 1944–1945; USS Hocking, 1945–1946; USS Burleson 1946–1947; Commodore of Destroyer Squadron 18, 1952–1953; Naval Receiving Station, Brooklyn Navy Yard, 1953–1956
- Conflicts: Second Nicaraguan Campaign; World War II: Guadalcanal Campaign; Battle of Cape Esperance; Battle of Kula Gulf; Okinawa Campaign
- Awards: Navy Cross; Purple Heart
- Other work: Executive Director, Pennsylvania United Theological Seminary Foundation; Genealogist

Rear Admiral Charles Lorain Carpenter (July 31, 1902 – February 21, 1992) was a Naval officer and a holder of the Navy Cross and a Purple Heart. His career encompassed combat action in Nicaragua. He was involved in all three theaters of operations in World War II and naval combat in the Pacific. He commanded attack transports during the war and an animal research vessel in the post-World War II-era Operation Crossroads series of atomic bomb tests. He earned nine Service Bars, the U.S. Navy Combat Command Insignia, and foreign decorations from the governments of Nicaragua, Peru, and Spain. Of his 30 years of active military service, 22 years were spent at sea or on foreign shores.

== Early life ==
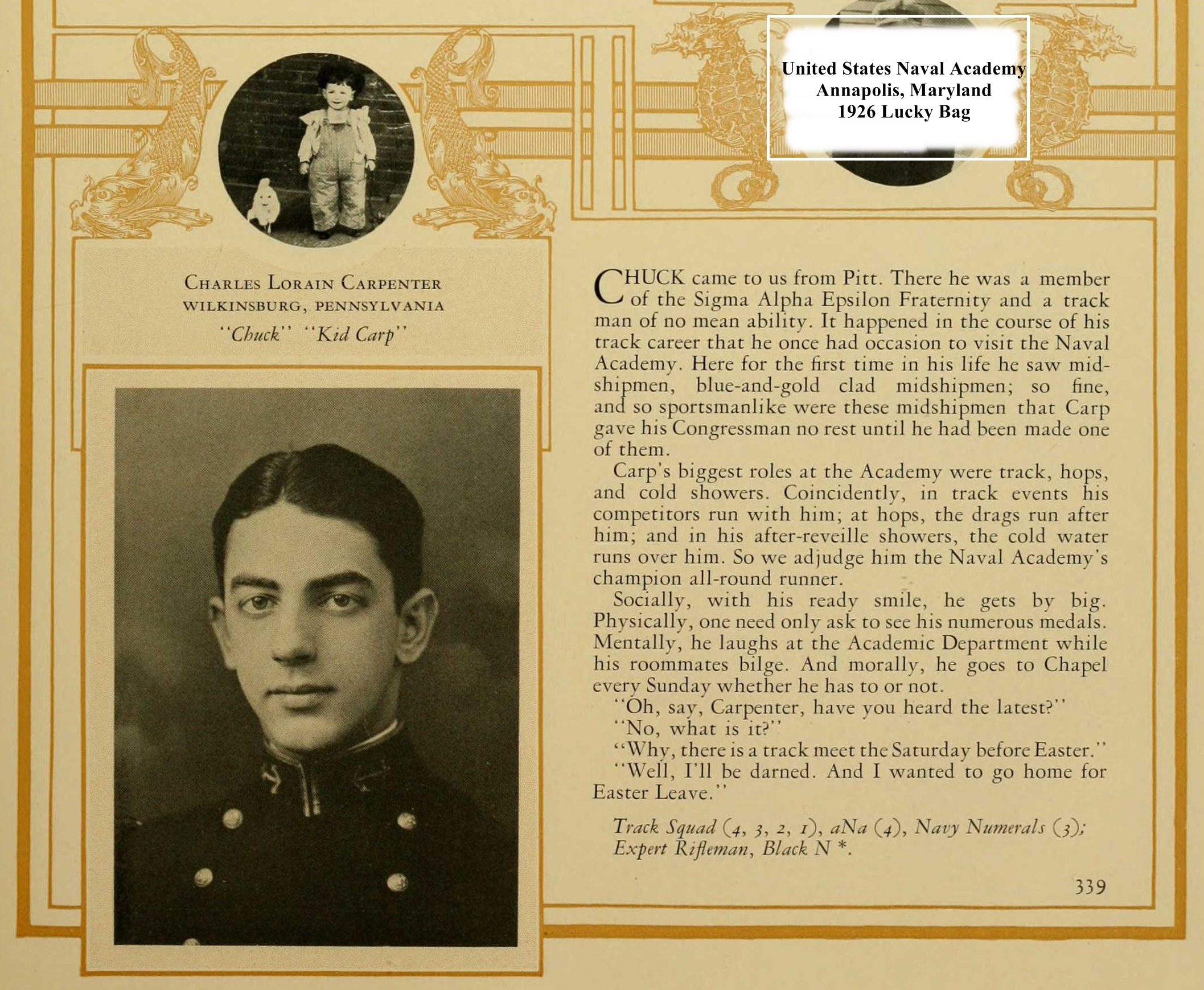
Midshipman Charles L. Carpenter biography entry in the United States Naval Academy 1926 Lucky Bag

Charles, also known as "Chuck" when younger and "Charlie" when older, was born July 31, 1902, in Greensburg, Pennsylvania. He was the first son of Charles C. "Timothy" and Jennie Addell (Wilson) Carpenter. He was a direct descendant of William Carpenter, who emigrated from England to Providence, Rhode Island, in 1635. Carpenter received his early education in the public schools of Wilkinsburg, Pennsylvania, east of Pittsburgh, Pennsylvania. He enjoyed running and track, which he continued through his upper education. He was also a member of the Sigma Alpha Epsilon Fraternity.

After graduating from high school, Carpenter attended the University of Pittsburgh, where he studied mechanical engineering and participated in the US Army ROTC (Reserve Officers' Training Corps) program. In spring 1922, Carpenter received an appointment to the U.S. Naval Academy from M. Clyde Kelly, Congressional Representative of Pennsylvania's 30th congressional district. He was sworn in on June 16, 1922, and became a plebe, or freshman, at the academy.

Carpenter graduated from the U.S. Naval Academy at Annapolis, Maryland, on June 26, 1926, and was commissioned an ensign in the US Navy.

== US Navy career ==
Following his commissioning, Carpenter was deployed to naval service in what was later called the Second Nicaraguan Campaign.

=== USS Galveston – 1926 ===
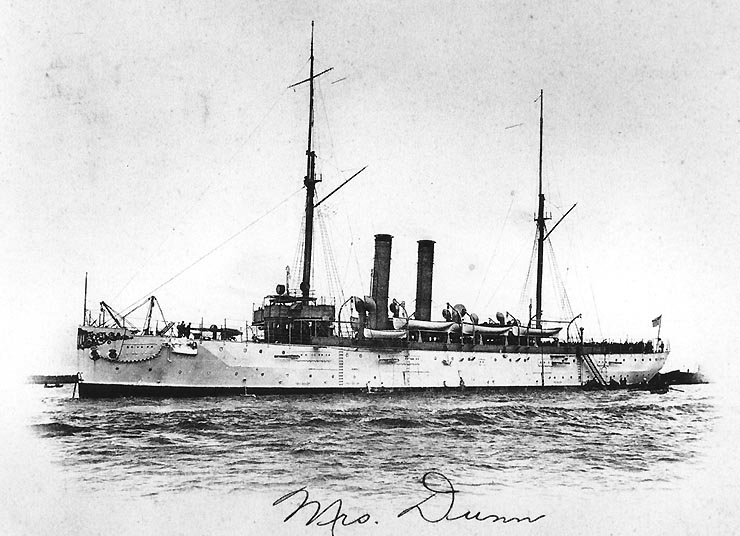
USS Galveston in Manila Bay on July 12, 1908. USN Photo # 83673.

Carpenter's first assignment after graduation was to the gunnery department of the USS Galveston, a Denver-class protected cruiser. (Note: DANFS USS Galveston) Galveston was with the Special Service Squadron and conducted gunboat diplomacy out of Christobal and Balboa, Panama.

Carpenter participated in several landing force details, including one at León, Nicaragua. It was at this time that he was recognized and awarded the Navy Cross for his valor. His "extraordinary heroism, coolness and excellent judgment in the performance of duty" in the Leon detachment of the landing force on May 17, 1927, earned him the Navy Cross awarded by the President of the United States.

The President of the United States of America takes pleasure in presenting the Navy Cross to Ensign Charles Lorain Carpenter (NSN: 0-60331), United States Navy, for extraordinary heroism, coolness and excellent judgment in the performance of duty during an insurrection in Nicaragua. Ensign Carpenter was a member of the Leon detachment of the landing force and on 17 May 1927, while attempting to arrest and disarm an ex-rebel soldier after having been twice fired on, and at the time being surrounded by a crowd who egged on his aggressor, he in self defense shot and killed the soldier in question, thereby producing a most salutary effect on the population. His actions at all times were in keeping with the highest traditions of the United States Naval Service. Action Date: 17-May-27 Service: Navy Rank: Ensign Division: Leon Detachment

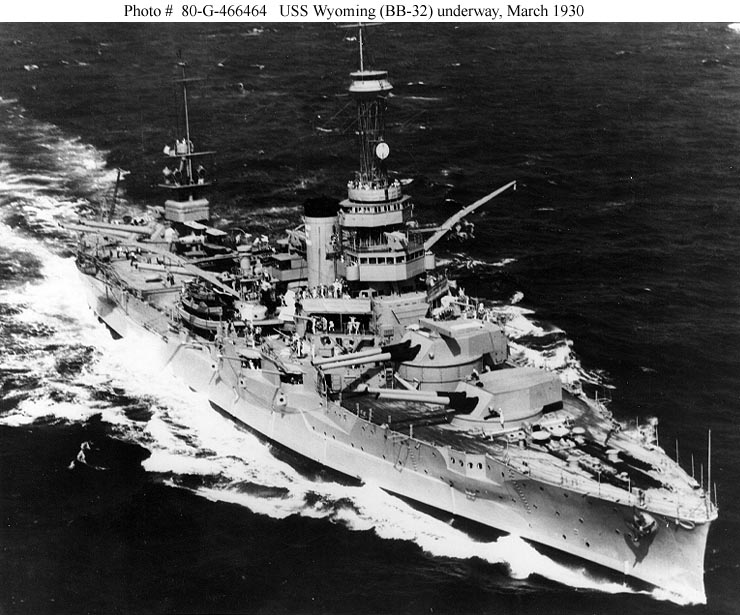
USS Wyoming at sea in March 1930. Forward gun turrets are conducting gun drills.

After returning to the US, Carpenter was stationed at the Boston Navy Yard and then assigned to duty in the United States Pacific Fleet.

=== USS Wyoming – 1928 ===
In 1928, Carpenter (Service Number 60331) served as the Assistant Navigator on the USS Wyoming. She was the lead ship of her class of dreadnought battleships.

In late August 1928, Wyoming went to Philadelphia for an extensive modernization. Her old coal-fired boilers were replaced with new oil-fired models, and anti-torpedo bulges were added to improve her resistance to underwater damage. The work was completed by November 2, after which Wyoming conducted a shakedown cruise to Cuba and the Virgin Islands. She was back in Philadelphia on December 7, and two days later, she returned to her post as the flagship of the Scouting Fleet, flying the flag of Vice Admiral Ashley Robertson. (Note: DANFS USS Wyoming)

=== USS Trenton – 1929 ===
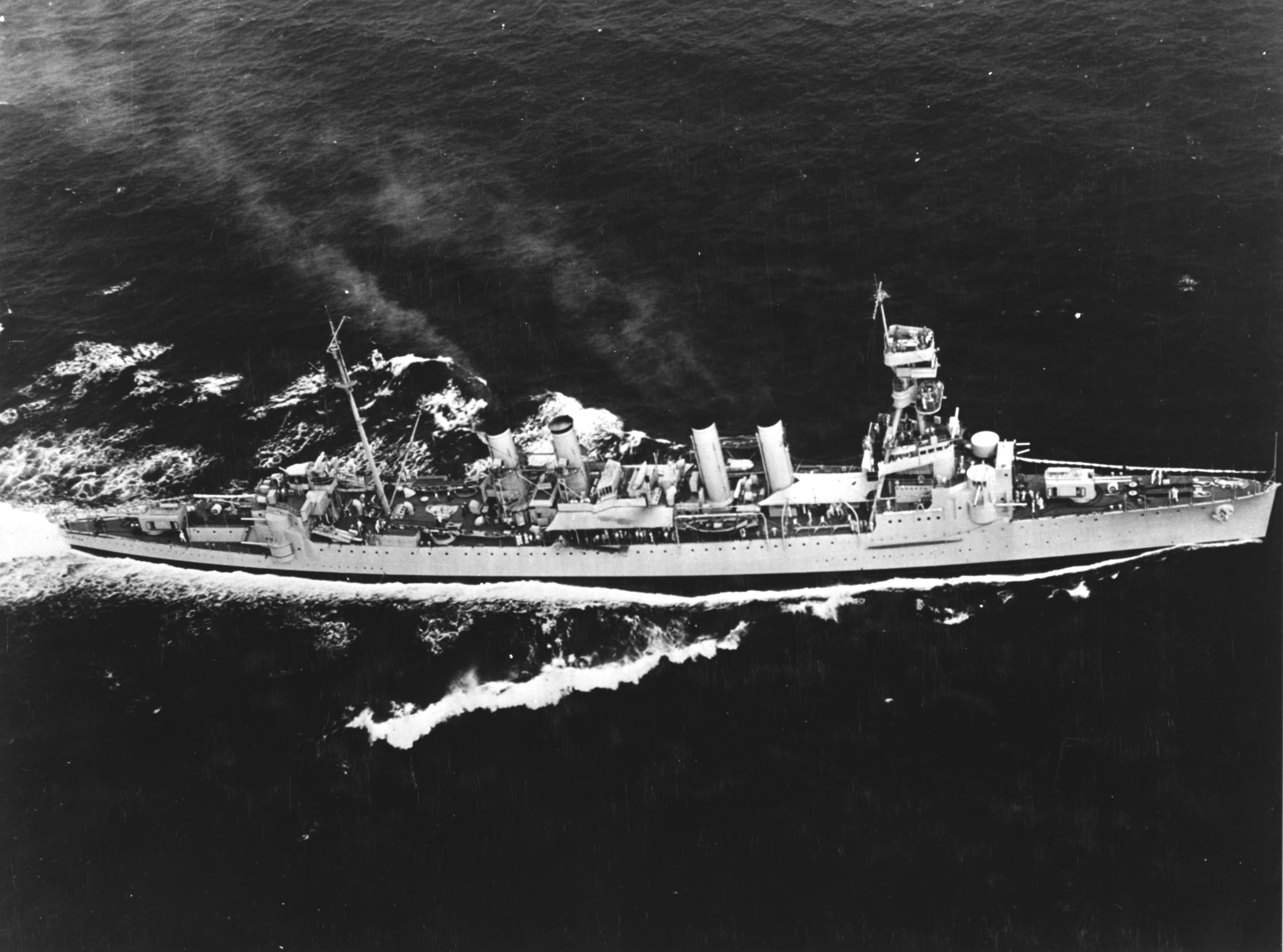

From 1929 to 1933, he was on the USS Trenton. His last job on Trenton was as the 3-inch A.A. (anti-aircraft) officer. While aboard Trenton in May 1929, the ship's division was detached from the Asiatic Fleet, and she steamed back to the United States along with Memphis and Milwaukee. The light cruiser was overhauled at Philadelphia in the latter part of 1929 and then rejoined the Scouting Fleet. For the next four years, Trenton resumed the Scouting Fleet's schedule of winter maneuvers in the Caribbean, followed by summer exercises off the New England coast. Periodically, however, she was ordered to the Isthmian coast to bolster the Special Service Squadron during periods of extreme political unrest in one or more of the republics of Central America. Carpenter left Trenton in the spring of 1933 before she moved to the Pacific and became the flagship of the Battle Force cruisers. (Note: DANFS USS Trenton)

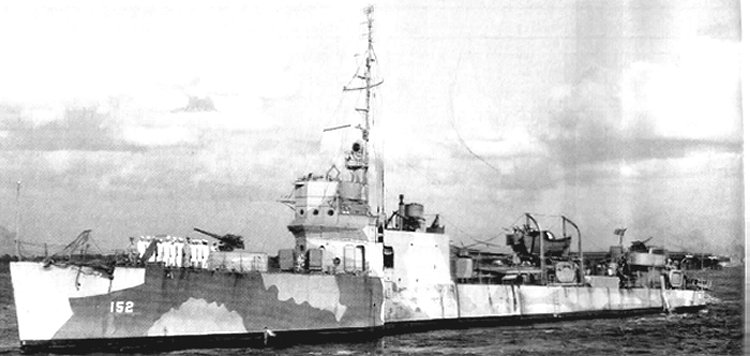

=== Shore duty & USS Du Pont – 1933 ===
In 1933, Carpenter was rotated from seven years of sea duty to shore duty as Assistant District Communications Officer and District Issuing Officer for the First Naval District, then at Portsmouth Naval Yard.

However, Sergeant Fulgencio Batista and the 1933 Cuban "Revolt of the Sergeants" caused a sudden need for Landing Force officers. Carpenter volunteered and went to sea on temporary duty on the USS Du Pont, a Wickes-class destroyer. Du Pont was then in Rotating Reserve Squadron 19. She operated from Boston, training Naval Reservists, until assigned temporary duty on patrol off Cuba from September 1933 until February 1934, during which time Carpenter was aboard. (Note: DANFS USS Du Pont)

=== USS Gold Star – 1934 ===
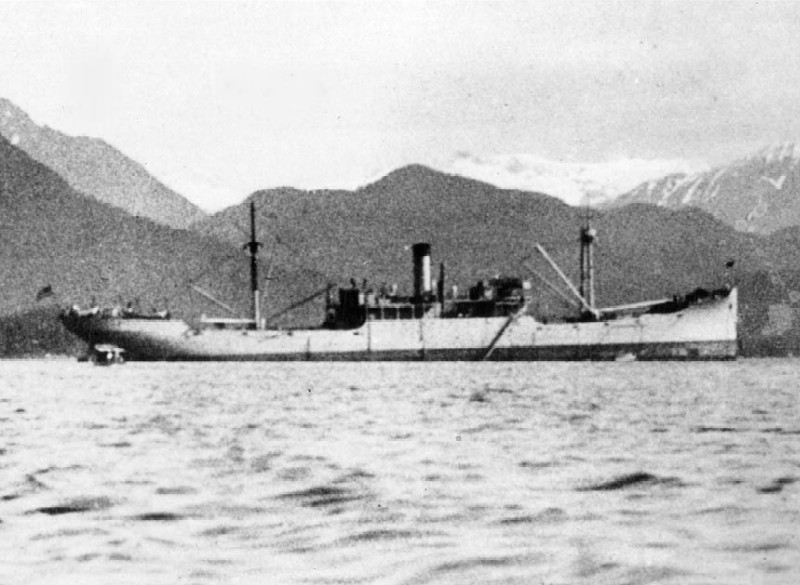
USS Gold Star, at anchor off Sitka, Alaska, in September 1922, before her partial conversion into a communication intelligence ship in 1933.

Going back to sea duty, he served on the USS Gold Star, a civilian cargo ship purchased in 1922. During the 1920s and 1930s, the Gold Star became a familiar sight in the ports of Asia. Though assigned as the flagship at Guam, she made frequent voyages to Japan, China, and the Philippines with cargo and passengers. Prior to World War II, much of her crew was made up of Chamorro sailors, natives of Guam, with American non-commissioned officers and commissioned officers like Carpenter. Strangely, Carpenter's records of what he did on the "Gold Star" are absent from the spring of 1934 into early 1936. (Note: DANFS USS Gold Star)

In 1934, Gold Star was a veteran Q-Ship dealing with communications intelligence. As a station ship, she was assigned to monitor internal Japanese Fleet frequencies and make frequency measurements and direction finder azimuths. She had three intercept operators and one chief radioman supervised by an officer. This all started in 1933, during the reconstruction of the Japanese fleet by Tokyo. Gold Star—along with ground stations at Guam, Olongapo, and Beijing—provided significant intelligence before the Japanese attack on Pearl Harbor on December 7, 1941.

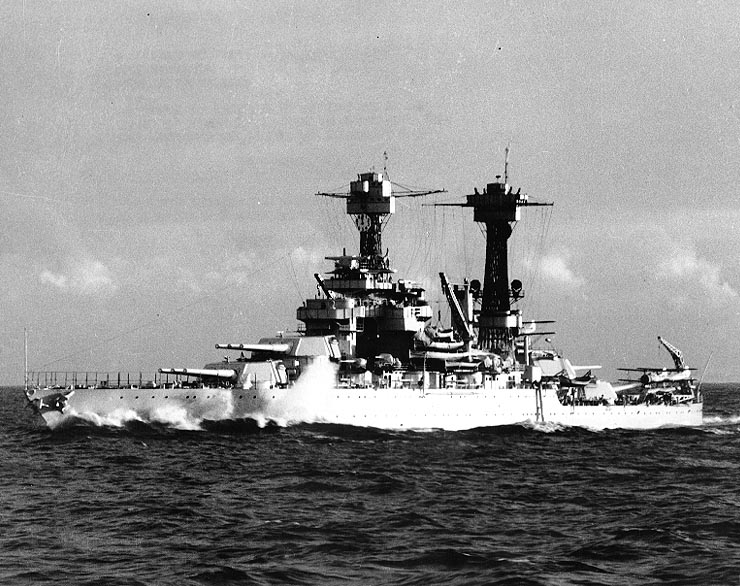

Carpenter had married Dorothy Gertrude Hanna on August 8, 1931, and had a child, Charles Lorain Carpenter Jr., on August 31, 1934. His wife, "Dottie", had the unique experience of sailing on the Gold Star with her husband and their infant son, who was named "Skipper" while on board the ship. The ship, with Carpenter's new family, conducted seven loops of about seven weeks each around the Orient. Some of the other officers and senior petty officers were permitted to have their families with them for much shorter periods when the ship sailed from Guam. It appears that the Carpenter family received the most benefit from this unique window-dressing distraction. It is unknown if Carpenter's wife was ever aware that while the ship visited various ports in Japan like Miki-Ko, Nagasaki, Kobe, Nagoya, and Yokohama, part of the ship was spying on the Japanese.

=== USS Tennessee – 1936 ===
Carpenter was then assigned to the USS Tennessee in 1936 during Panama Fleet maneuvers. Next, he was assigned to shore duty with the Fourth Naval District, headquartered at League Island Navy Yard in Philadelphia, Pennsylvania. Again, his duties are not given. (Note: DANFS USS Tennessee)

=== USS Doran – 1940 ===
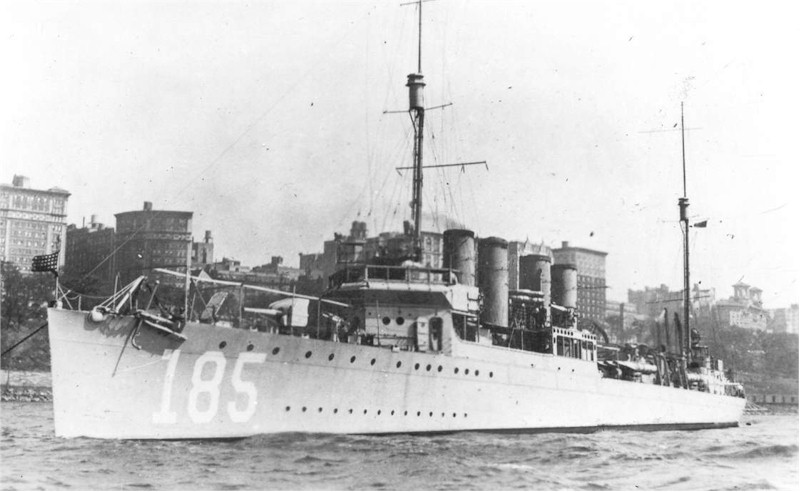
The former USS Bagley, later renamed USS Doran and finally called HMS St. Mary's by late 1940. This image is believed to be from about 1933, when the ship was on loan to the United States Coast Guard.

Carpenter was assigned to the newly renamed Wickes-class destroyer USS Doran as its commanding officer in early 1940. (Note: DANFS USS Doran) She had been named Bagley but was decommissioned on July 12, 1922. She served on loan from 1932 to 1934 with the United States Coast Guard. Her name was dropped on May 31, 1935, allowing the US Navy to reuse the name for a new ship by the same name, Bagley, a Bagley-class destroyer commissioned in 1936. From 1935 to late 1939, the ex-Bagley was referred to as DD-185 (ex-Bagley). The start of World War II and the Royal Navy's dire need for destroyers saved her from the shipbreakers. She was refurbished in Philadelphia. DD-185 was renamed Doran on December 22, 1939. (Note: DANFS USS Bagley)

Carpenter worked on readying Doran for sea duty, and the ship was recommissioned on June 17, 1940. Doran reported to the Atlantic Squadron. They served with the Squadron until September 22, 1940, when she was decommissioned from the US Navy at Halifax, Nova Scotia, and transferred in the destroyer-land bases exchange to Great Britain to serve in the Royal Navy as HMS St. Mary's, a Town-class destroyer.

=== USS Washington – 1941 ===
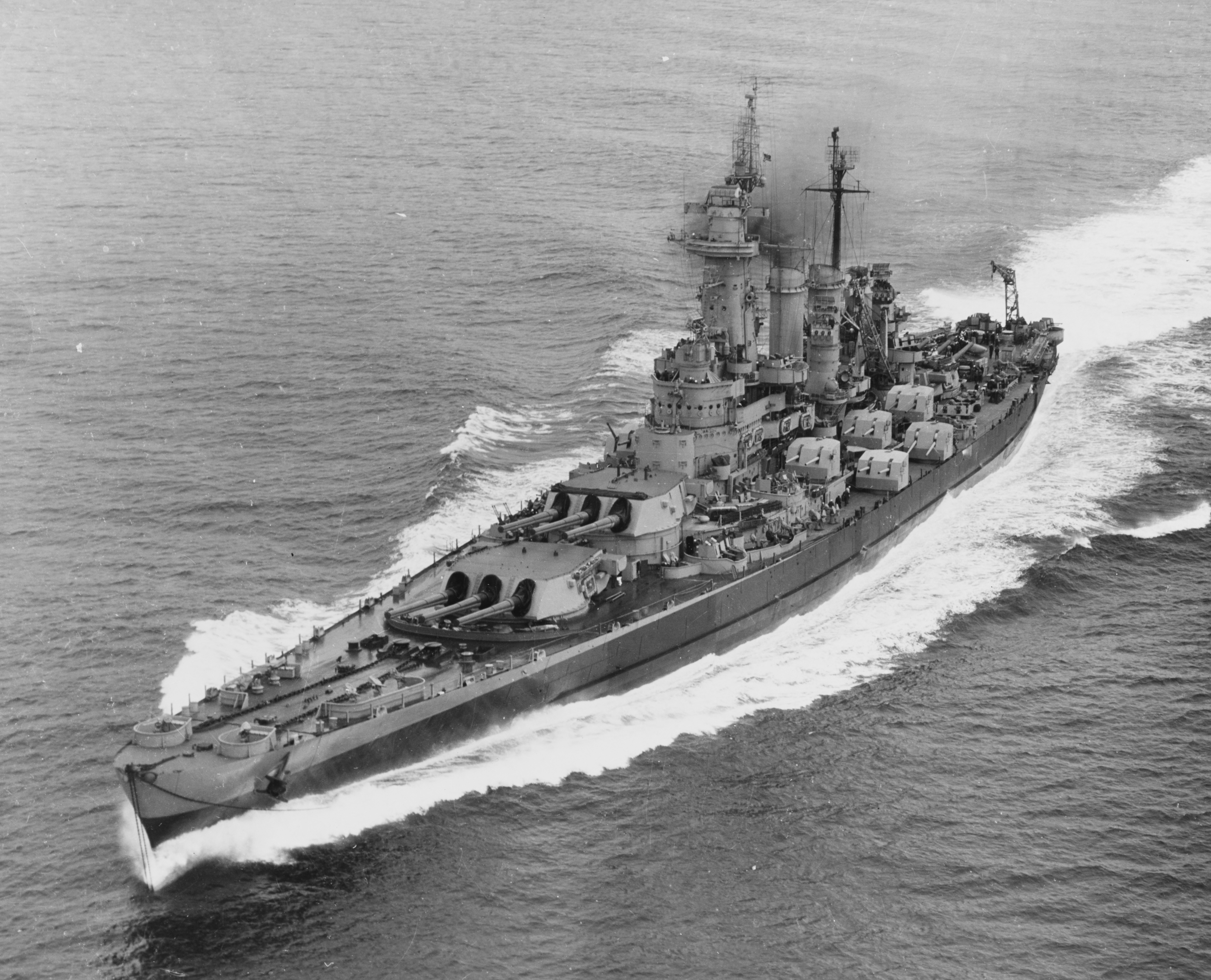

In 1941, he was on the USS Washington, a North Carolina-class battleship, as its Damage Control Officer. Washington was commissioned on May 15, 1941, and assigned to the Atlantic Fleet. Because of major problems with acute longitudinal vibrations from her propeller shafts, full power tests were delayed until August 3, 1941. Repairs greatly reduced the vibrations by adding new propeller combinations. This greatly reduced tank, pipe, and other equipment breakages that kept Carpenter and other damage control personnel busy. (Note: DANFS USS Washington)

On December 7, 1941, Carpenter was on the Washington. In early 1942, US Navy reassignments were made. Carpenter went from the Atlantic to the United States Pacific Fleet for war duty.

== World War II ==
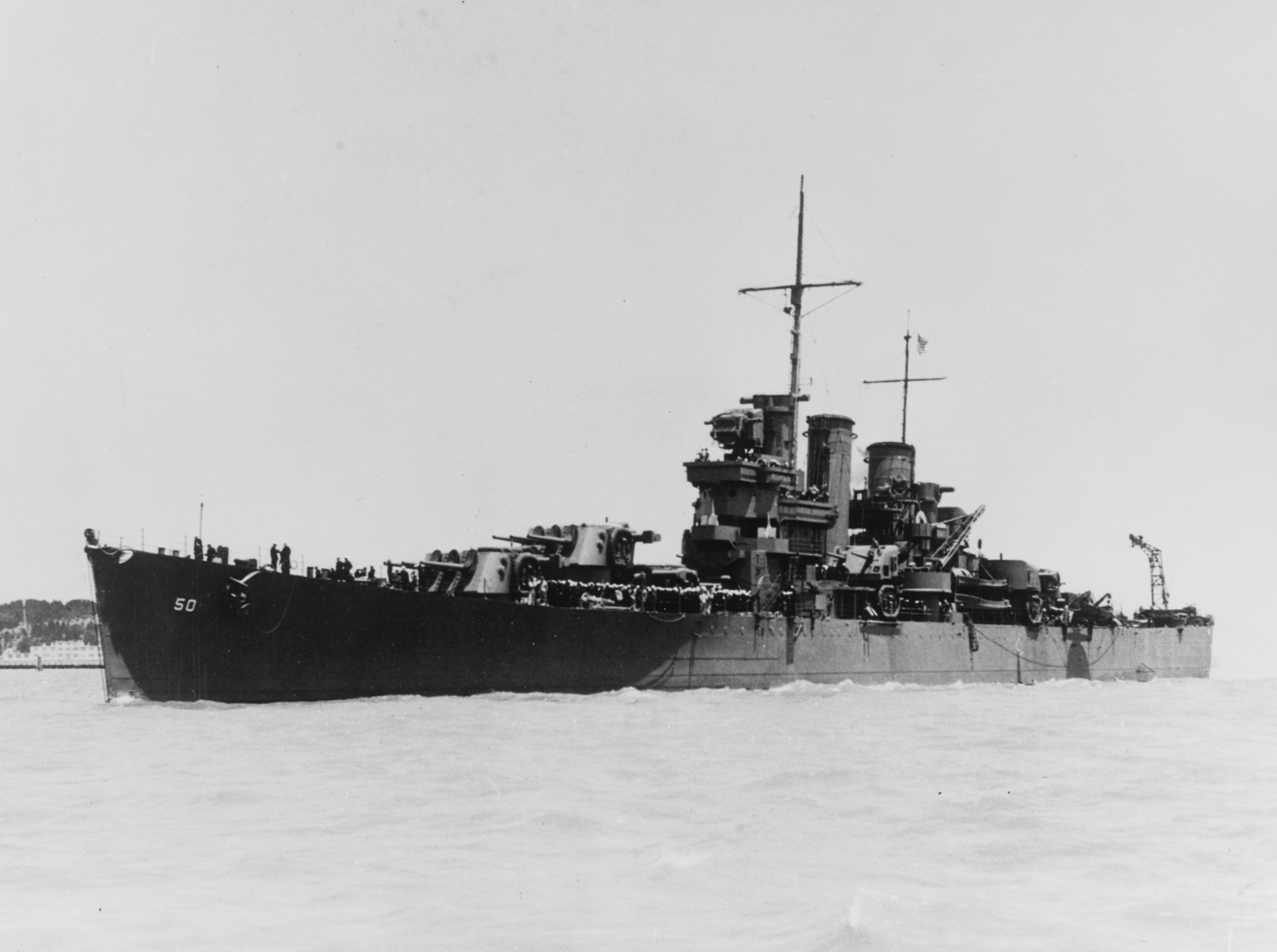
USS Helena off Mare Island Navy Yard, California, following battle damage repairs and overhaul, 1 July 1942. This image has been retouched to censor radar antennas from the gun directors and masts. She was sunk by enemy action on July 6, 1943, in the Battle of Kula Gulf during the Solomon Islands Campaign.

=== USS Helena ===
Carpenter was the navigator on the USS Helena, a St. Louis-class light cruiser, when she sailed to enter action during the Guadalcanal Campaign in 1942. (Note: DANFS USS Helena) He was third in command of the ship. They escorted a detachment of Seabees and an aircraft carrier, rushing planes to the South Pacific. She made two quick dashes from Espiritu Santo to Guadalcanal, where the long and bloody battle for the island was then beginning, and having completed these missions, she joined the task force formed around the aircraft carrier Wasp. This task force steamed in distant support of six transports carrying Marine reinforcements to Guadalcanal. Mid-afternoon on September 15, 1942, Wasp was suddenly hit by three Japanese torpedoes. Almost at once, she became an inferno. Helena stood by to rescue nearly 400 of Wasp's crew, whom she took to Espiritu Santo.

Helena's next action was near Rennell Island, again in support of a movement of transports into Guadalcanal. During the Battle of Cape Esperance in October 1942, Carpenter navigated the Helena into combat to protect the transports carrying the 2,837 men of the 164th Infantry Regiment to Guadalcanal. Vice Admiral Robert L. Ghormley—overall commander of Allied forces in the South Pacific—ordered Task Force 64 (TF 64), consisting of four cruisers (San Francisco, Boise, Salt Lake City, and Helena) and five destroyers (Farenholt, Duncan, Buchanan, McCalla, and Laffey) under U.S. Rear Admiral Norman Scott, to intercept and combat any Japanese ships approaching Guadalcanal and threatening the convoy. Scott conducted one night of battle practice with his ships on October 8, then took station south of Guadalcanal near Rennell Island on October 9 to await word of any Japanese naval movement toward the southern Solomons. (Note: Since not all of the Task Force 64 warships were available, Scott's force was designated as Task Group 64.2. The U.S. destroyers were from Squadron 12, commanded by Captain Robert G. Tobin in Farenholt.)

Carpenter was on the bridge during this confused night battle, where he assisted in plotting radar sightings. Helena's radar showed the Japanese warships to be about 27,700 yd (25,300 m) away. Between 23:42 and 23:44, Helena and Boise reported their contacts to Scott on San Francisco, who mistakenly believed that the two cruisers were actually tracking the three U.S. destroyers that were thrown out of formation during the column turn. Scott radioed Farenholt to ask if the destroyer was attempting to resume its station at the front of the column. Farenholt replied, "Affirmative, coming up on your starboard side," further confirming Scott's belief that the radar contacts were his own destroyers.

Lookouts on the Helena reported Helena's and Salt Lake City's lookouts. The U.S. formation at this point was in position to cross the T of the Japanese formation, giving Scott's ships a significant tactical advantage. At 23:46, still assuming that Scott was aware of the rapidly approaching Japanese warships, Helena radioed for permission to open fire, using the general procedure request, "Interrogatory Roger" (meaning, basically, "Are we clear to act?"). Scott answered with "Roger", only meaning that the message was received, not that he was confirming the request to act. Upon receipt of Scott's "Roger", Helena—thinking they now had permission—opened fire, quickly followed by Boise, Salt Lake City, and, to Scott's further surprise, San Francisco. The Japanese force was taken almost completely by surprise.

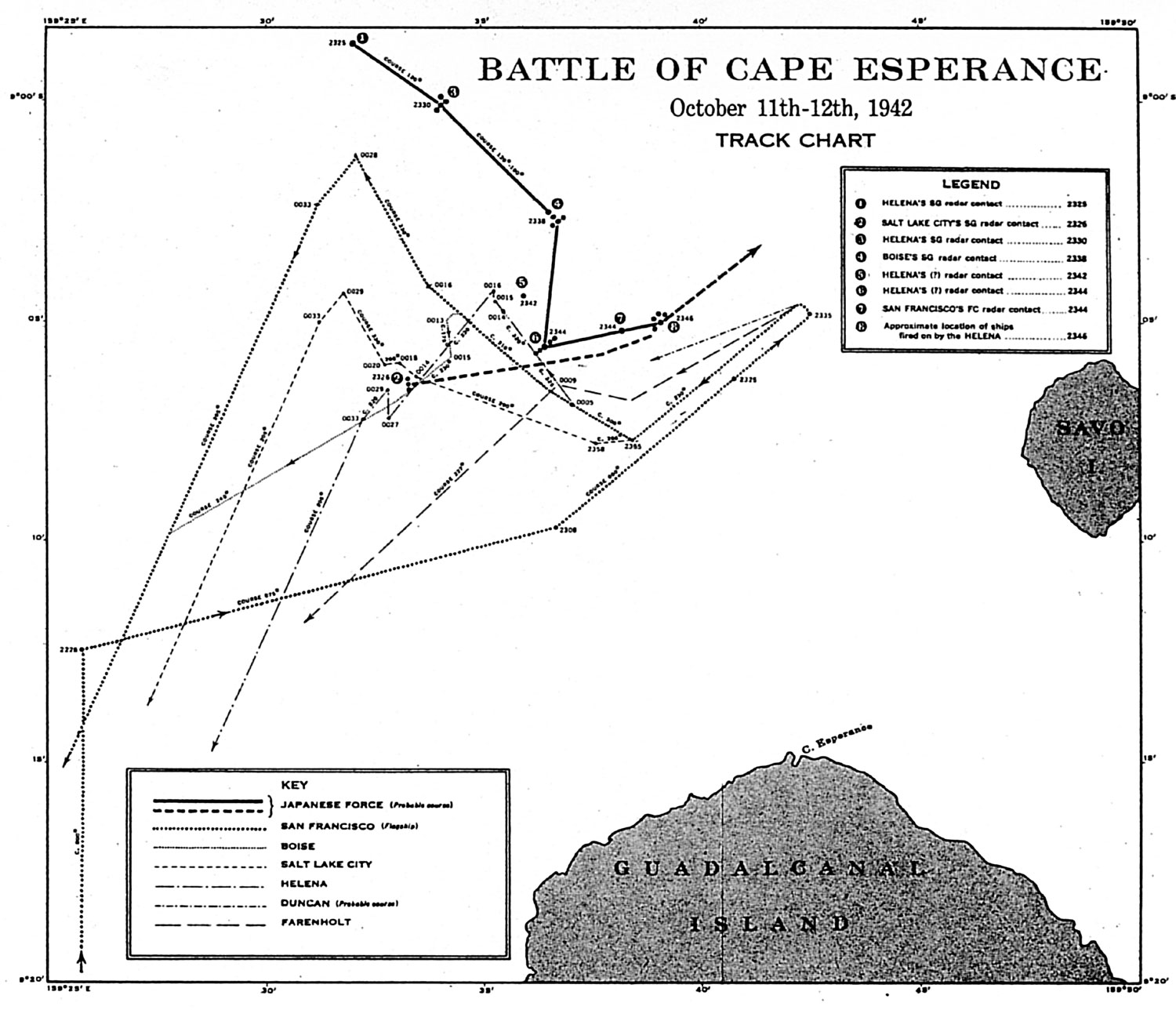
U.S. Navy track chart of the battle accurately depicts the movements of the U.S. ships (lower tracks) but not the Japanese ship tracks (upper, darker line).

A junior officer on Helena later wrote, "Cape Esperance was a three-sided battle in which chance was the major winner." Helena was next under attack on the night of October 20 while patrolling between Espiritu Santo and San Cristobal. Several torpedoes passed near her, but she was not hit. Carpenter, who had had special instruction on torpedo avoidance, was teaching others well.

In November 1942, Carpenter and Helena saw combat during the Naval Battle of Guadalcanal from its beginning when they were assigned the job of escorting a supply echelon from Espiritu Santo to Guadalcanal. The ship made a rendezvous with the convoy of transports off San Cristobal on November 11 and brought it safely into Guadalcanal. During the afternoon of November 12, word came from a coast watcher, "enemy aircraft approaching." Immediately suspending unloading operations, all ships stood out to form an antiaircraft disposition. When the attack came, superb maneuvering by the force and its own antiaircraft fire broke up the first attack, but the second damaged two ships. Helena came through without a scratch, and the task group brought down eight enemy planes in the eight-minute action.

In the early morning at 0124 hours on the night of November 13, Helena's radar first located the enemy from the rear center of the allied single column of ships just behind Portland. Despite Carpenter's effort in plotting the enemy's course on radar, they had trouble communicating the information to Callaghan because of his inexperience operating the ships as a cohesive naval unit. There was no modern Command Information Center (CIC) communicating information seen by radar, which was still new. Add problems with their radio equipment and a further lack of discipline regarding their communications procedures. Another message was sent and received, but it did not reach Callaghan in time to process and use it given his ignorance of radar and an appreciation of its accuracy—especially the reliability of ranges and bearings so obtained—along with his lack of practice coordinating radar information with visual data.

The U.S. ship formation began to fall apart, apparently further delaying Callaghan's order to commence firing as he first tried to ascertain and align his ships' locations. Meanwhile, both forces' formations began to intermingle with each other as the individual ship commanders on both sides anxiously awaited permission to open fire. Navigators like Carpenter struggled to retain the positioning of their ship within the resulting melee.

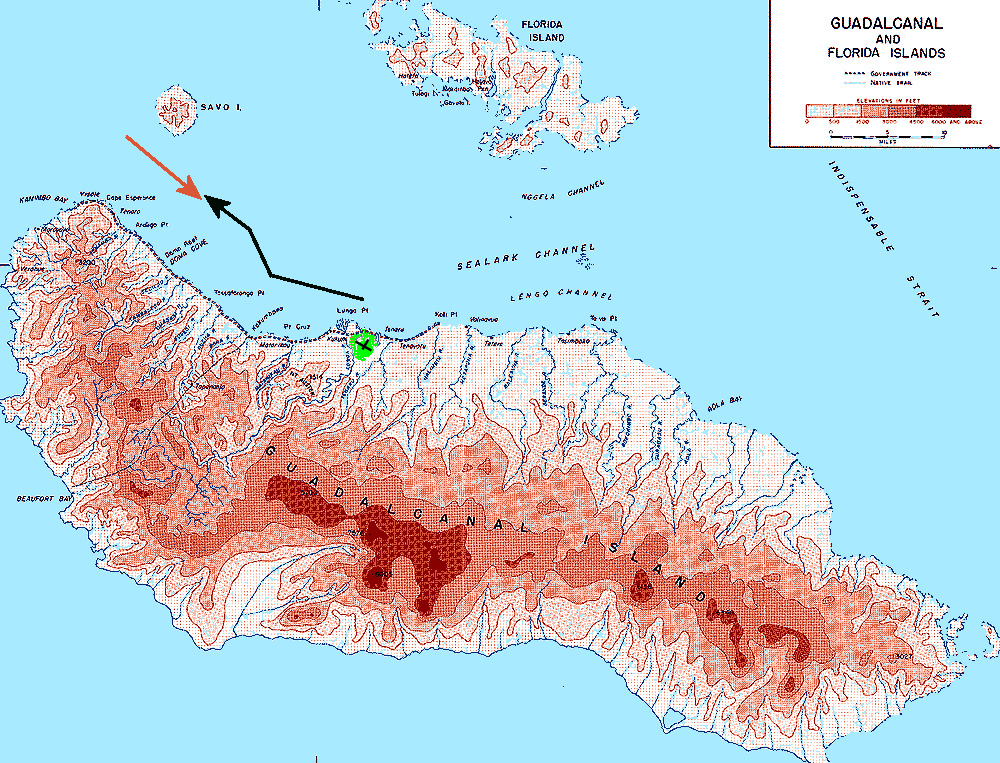
Approximate routes of Japanese force under Abe (red line) and U.S. force under Callaghan (black line) as they head towards each other early on November 13 in Ironbottom Sound between Savo Island, Cape Esperance, and Lunga Point on Guadalcanal. The green area near Lunga Point on Guadalcanal marks the location of Henderson Field.

At 01:48, Akatsuki and Hiei turned on large searchlights and lit up Atlanta only 3,000 yd (2,700 m) away—almost point-blank range for large naval artillery. Several of the ships on both sides spontaneously opened fire. Realizing that his force was almost surrounded by Japanese ships, Callaghan issued the confusing order: "Odd ships fire to starboard, even ships fire to port" (save that no pre-battle planning had assigned any such identity numbers to reference, and the formation was already chaotic). Most of the remaining U.S. ships, including the Helena, then opened fire, although several had to quickly change their targets in order to comply with Callaghan's order. As the ships from the two sides intermingled, they battled each other in an utterly confused and chaotic mêlée at close distances, where the superior Japanese optics and well-practiced Japanese drill at optically sighted night aiming proved to be deadly effective. Afterward, an officer on Monssen likened it to "a barroom brawl after the lights had been shot out".

At least six of the U.S. ships—including Helena—fired at Akatsuki, which drew attention to herself with her illuminated searchlight. Akatsuki was hit repeatedly, blew up, and sank within a few minutes.

During the almost post-blank melee and unable to fire her main or secondary batteries at the three US destroyers causing her so much trouble, the Japanese ship Hiei instead concentrated on San Francisco, which was passing by only 2,500 yd (2,300 m) away. Along with Kirishima, Inazuma, and Ikazuchi, the four ships made repeated hits on San Francisco, disabling her steering control and killing Admiral Callaghan, Captain Cassin Young, and most of the bridge staff. The first few salvos from Hiei and Kirishima consisted of the special fragmentation bombardment shells, which reduced damage to the interior of San Francisco and may have saved her from being sunk outright. Not expecting a ship-to-ship confrontation, it took the crews of the two Imperial battleships several minutes to switch to armor-piercing ammunition. Nevertheless, San Francisco, almost helpless to defend herself, managed to momentarily sail clear of the melee. However, she landed at least one shell in Hiei's steering gear room during the exchange, flooding it with water, shorting out her power steering generators, and severely inhibiting Hiei's steering capability. Helena followed San Francisco to try to protect her from further harm.

The enemy, Amatsukaze, approached San Francisco with the intention of finishing her off. However, while concentrating on San Francisco, Amatsukaze did not notice the approach of Helena, who fired several full broadsides at Amatsukaze from close range and knocked her out of the action. The heavily damaged Amatsukaze escaped under cover of a smoke screen while Helena was distracted by an attack by Asagumo, Murasame, and Samidare.

After nearly 40 minutes of brutal, close-quarters fighting, the two sides broke contact and ceased fire at 02:26 after Abe and Captain Gilbert Hoover (the captain of Helena and senior surviving U.S. officer at this point) ordered their respective forces to disengage. Admiral Abe had one battleship (Kirishima), one light cruiser (Nagara), and four destroyers (Asagumo, Teruzuki, Yukikaze, and Harusame) with only light damage and four destroyers (Inazuma, Ikazuchi, Murasame, and Samidare) with moderate damage. The U.S. had only one light cruiser (Helena) and one destroyer (Fletcher) that were still capable of effective resistance. Although perhaps unclear to Abe, the way was clear for him to bombard Henderson Field and finish off the U.S. naval forces in the area, clearing the way for the troops and supplies to be landed safely on Guadalcanal. However, at this crucial juncture, the Japanese commander chose to abandon the mission and depart the area. Helena and other US ships had turned back the enemy and prevented the heavy attack that would have been disastrous to the Marine troops ashore.

The US ships Portland, San Francisco, Aaron Ward, and Sterett were eventually able to make it back to rear-area ports for repairs. Atlanta, however, sank near Guadalcanal at 20:00 on November 13. Departing from the Solomon Islands area with San Francisco, Helena, Sterret, and O'Bannon later that day, Juneau was torpedoed and sunk by the Japanese submarine I-26.

The captain of Helena, now the senior American officer in the task force because of the death of the task force commander Callaghan in action, Helena's skipper, Captain Gilbert Hoover, commanded the task force's retirement to Espiritu Santo from the battle area. While he focused on this new duty, Carpenter commanded the bridge of Helena. On the way, the light cruiser Juneau was torpedoed and sunk by a submarine. Despite the observed survivors, Captain Hoover assessed that the task force lacked the means to conduct a search and rescue in its current location and condition, with the battle leaving two ships with antisubmarine capacity on hand (one heavily damaged) and other ships too damaged to remain in the area.

Juneau's 100+ survivors (out of a total complement of 697) were left to fend for themselves in the open ocean for eight days before rescue aircraft belatedly arrived. While awaiting rescue, all but ten of Juneau's crew died from their injuries, the elements, or shark attacks. The dead included the five Sullivan brothers. For this inaction in rescue, Halsey removed Hoover from command of Helena, which he later regretted as a grievous mistake, writing in his memoirs that "Hoover's decision was in the best interests of victory".

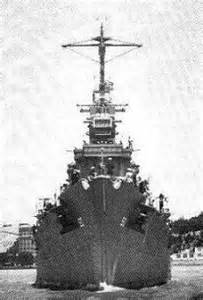
Bow on view of USS Helena leaving Mare Island, California in 1942.

==== Helmsman view ====
The scene was described in the memoirs of George Albert DeLong, helmsman of USS Helena, when USS Juneau was sunk:

My assignment was on the bridge in the pilot house as helmsman. While steering the ship I had the opportunity to glance out the portholes and I saw the condition of the San Francisco and the Juneau. I remember commenting to one of the men in the pilot house that the San Francisco looked so beat up that she would be lucky to make it back to Espiritu Santo, but that the Juneau, while she was down by the bow, still looked seaworthy enough to make it back

Shortly thereafter, however, Lt. Comdr. Carpenter, the ship's navigator, who seldom left the bridge, shouted, "Hard right rudder, DeLong." I spun the rudder over hard right and started singing out the course changes every ten degrees. I glanced out the porthole as the bow swung past the line of sight to the Juneau who had been on our starboard quarter in the formation. The ship was swinging at a rapid speed now and I had no idea what was going on.

Suddenly, Comdr. Carpenter hollered, "Hard left rudder." I reversed the rudder, but the momentum was still carrying the ship to the right. The ship shuddered for several seconds and slowly started to turn left when an immense explosion took place. I glanced out the porthole and all I could see was a huge cloud in the direction the Juneau had been.

By this time the Helena was making good time through the water again and picking up momentum heading straight for the cloud. The wheel was still turned hard left and I had no idea where either the Juneau or the San Francisco were. Total silence reigned in the pilot house and on the wings of the bridge.

Now it was my turn to shout! "Where is she? Where is she? Where is she? I don't want to ram her!" Everyone was out on the wing of the bridge except me and no one other than myself was talking.

Finally, one of the sailors stuck his head in the door and quietly said, "DeLong, she ain't no more." I didn't fully understand what he meant but I decided to ease the rudder lest it bang against the stops and get stuck. I was a little late but in time enough to keep the rudder from jamming. There was a jolt as the rudder hit the stop, but it was light enough so there was no jamming.

The people that had gone outside now filled me in with what had happened. The Juneau didn't sink; she was blown up. Everyone had seen pieces of her flying through the sky. The largest piece was reported as one of her five inch gun mounts flying over the Helena.

Captain Hoover wisely decided to save all the ships he could and decided not to stop to look for survivors – no one thought there would be any. Even if there were, the subs might still be around and more ships and men could be lost.

As a footnote to this event, many years later, I ran across Lt. Comdr. Carpenter (by that time Admiral Carpenter) at a Helena reunion and he filled in some details that I hadn't known. We were seated across from each other at a dinner table. We were all telling sea stories and I started telling them my story (I had forgotten that it was Commander Carpenter who had issued the orders to the wheel). Right in the middle of my story Carpenter looked at me and said, "And do you know who issued those orders?" When I admitted that I didn't remember, but wished that I could, he replies, "I did." The minute he said that, I remembered.

From that point on he took over the story. He told us that in the early part of his career he had taken special training on spotting and tracing torpedo wakes and that was one of the reasons he felt a little safer when he was on the bridge in treacherous waters. As a result of his early training he was the first one to see the wakes of the two torpedoes coming from the port side. Both torpedoes went between the Helena and the San Francisco and when both ships turned, the torpedoes went past us and one of them hit the Juneau. We were not able to warn the Juneau in time to save her.

George A. DeLong

==== Sinking of Helena ====
Helena was later assigned to the several bombardments of Japanese positions on New Georgia in January 1943. One of Carpenter's shipmates, Lt. Bin "Red" Cochran[e], commanding the aft 5-inch battery on Helena, shot down a Japanese Aichi D3A Val dive-bomber with the second of three salvos of VT-fuzed shells near Guadalcanal. The fuzes were manufactured by the Crosley Corporation, and this was their first kill of an enemy aircraft. Helena's guns rocked the enemy at Munda and Vila Stanmore, leveling supply concentrations and gun emplacements. Continuing on patrol and escort in support of the Guadalcanal operation through February, one of her floatplanes shared in the sinking of the submarine Ro-102 on February 11. After an overhaul in Sydney, Australia, and a brief leave, Carpenter was back on Helena, headed to Espiritu Santo in March to participate in bombardments of New Georgia Island, soon to be invaded.

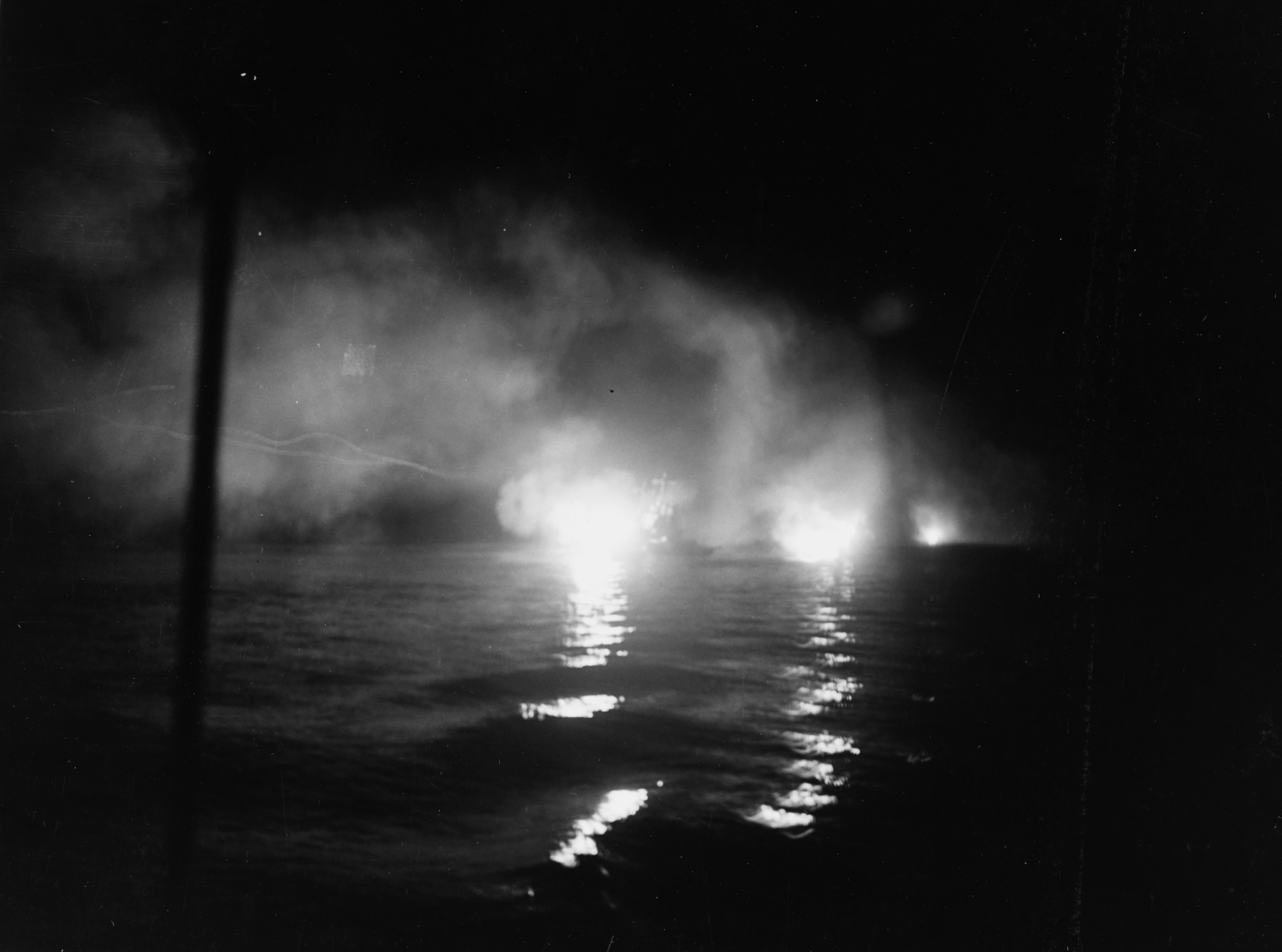
Helena in action at Kula Gulf on the night of her sinking, seen from the light cruiser Honolulu. Note: Bright flashes of gunfire are due to the use of older gunpowder for the main armament. At this time, flash-less powder was in short supply. These flashes gave the enemy a target for their torpedoes. This image is likely the last image of Helena.

On July 4, 1943, Carpenter navigated Helena into the Kula Gulf just before midnight. Shortly after midnight on the 5th, her guns opened up in what was to be her last shore bombardment. The landing of troops was completed successfully by dawn, but during the afternoon of July 5, word came that the Tokyo Express was ready to roar down once more, and the escort group turned north to meet it. By midnight on July 5, Helena's group was off the northwest corner of New Georgia, with three cruisers and four destroyers composing the group. Racing down to face them were three groups of Japanese destroyers, for a total of 10 enemy ships. Four of them peeled off to accomplish their mission of landing troops. By 01:57, the Battle of Kula Gulf had begun, and Helena began blasting away with a fire so rapid and intense that the Japanese later announced in all solemnity that she must have been armed with "6 inch machine guns". The gunners fired 2,000 six-inch rounds and 400 smaller rounds during the battle. Ironically, Helena made a perfect target when lit by the flashes of her own guns, which was compounded by the fact that Helena had fired all her flashless powder in the preceding bombardments and was left with standard smokeless powder, which produced immense flames when fired.

Captain Cecil had positioned himself on the "fighting bridge", an open-air command area. This was just below the forward main battery directors in an area that protruded a bit, giving him panoramic observation of events. Directly below Cecil's position was the enclosed pilot house, where Commander Carpenter stood overseeing operations there. Communications were done through a voice tube. Before Helena opened fire to port at 01:57, Carpenter and the rest of the crew were at their battle stations. About seven minutes after she opened fire at about 0203 hours, Helena was hit by a torpedo. The first enemy Type 93 torpedo, also called a Long Lance, could travel at 48–50 knots (89–93 km/h; 55–58 mph) and impacted Helena on the port side just below the number one turret (near frame 32), tearing off the bow of the ship. As the tall column of water thrown up by the explosion began to fall, the ship staggered and then began to surge ahead as the bow sheared off to starboard.

Further explosions by two more torpedoes that hit under the second stack, port side (near frame 82 and about frame 85) less than two minutes later at about 0205 caused catastrophic and terminal damage. Men were thrown about twice with each following explosion, and the force was greater the higher up in the ship's structure. This is the time that Carpenter was injured. The forward movement of the ship, along with the massive structural frame damage, caused the ship to twist and jackknife around the damaged area. The ship's momentum quickly fell off and began to flood. The center part was twisted to 45 degrees, port sinking first. It dragged the rear of the ship down until the stern was vertical. The men quickly realized that the damage was fatal and began to abandon ship. About 22 minutes after the ship was first hit, the ship sank at about 02:25. In the meantime, Carpenter, who had been wounded in the legs, and others of the crew abandoned ship by going over the side after cutting free all the surviving lift rafts into the ocean. Even though the forward momentum of the ship dropped off rapidly, the survivors were scattered over several hundred yards at night amidst a raging naval battle. Later currents would separate them even more.

In the dark night, the bow of Helena floated for some time with the ship number 50 showing. It became a lifeboat of sorts until friendly forces, not knowing what it was, almost fired at it. But USS Radford illuminated the unknown object and identified it as a ship's prow. Finally, the destroyer put a searchlight on the floating wreckage, which was identified as the remains of Helena. The bow would sink later the next day.

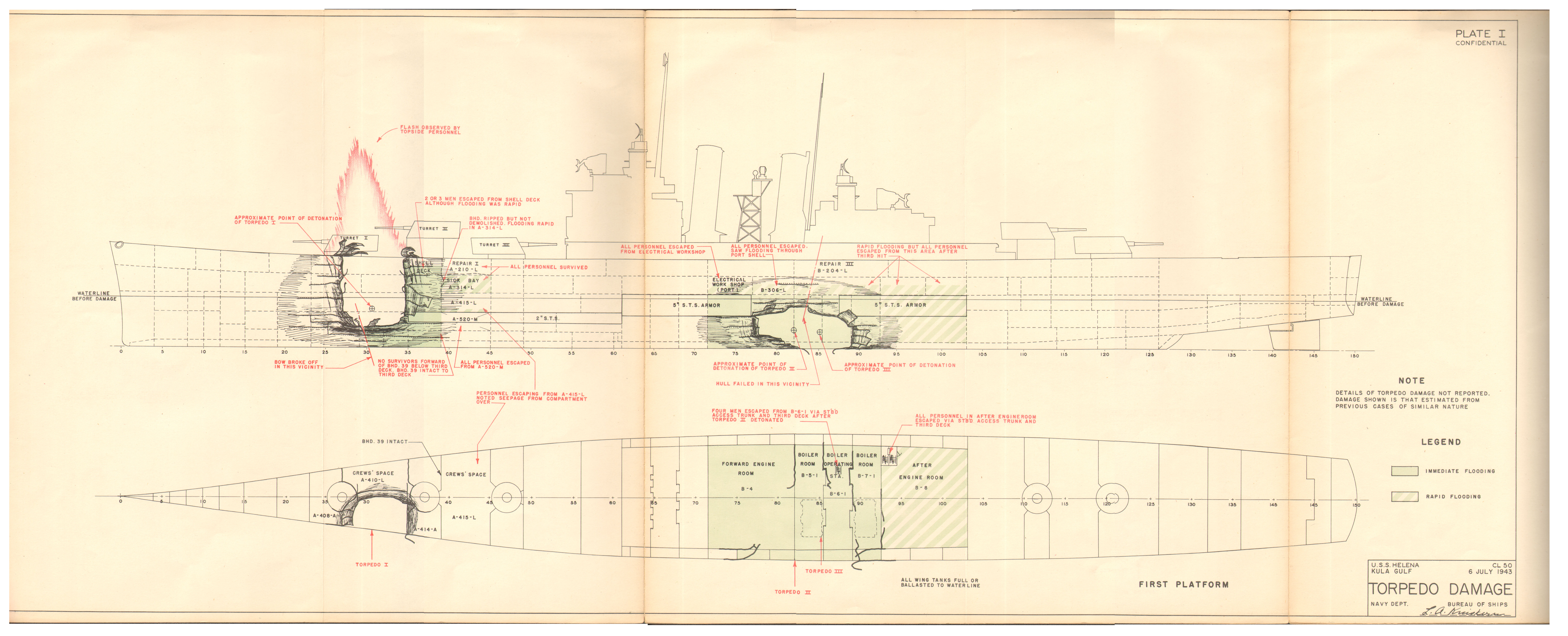
US Navy War Damage Report drawing of fatal damage to the USS Helena which was sunk on July 6, 1943.

==== Rescue of the crew ====
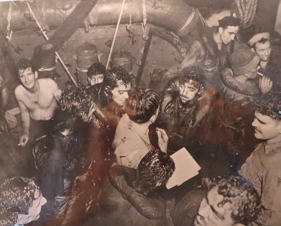
Aboard USS Nicholas after being rescued, Commander Charles L. Carpenter, Helena's navigator (center right, with moustache), still drenched in fuel oil after being rescued with other crew members.

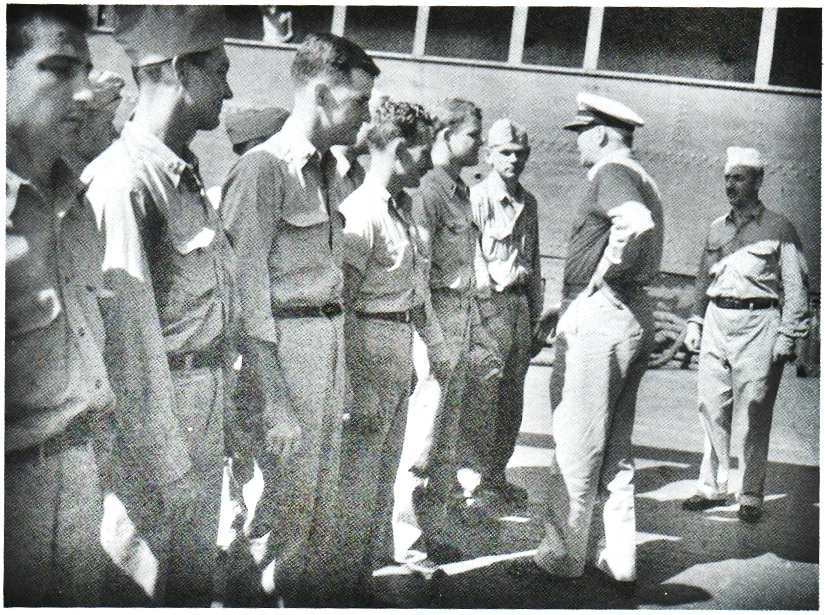
USS Helena survivors greeted by Admiral Walden Ainsworth, with cap, about July 7, 1943. Commander Charles L. Carpenter, senior officer of the first group of survivors rescued, is behind the admiral.

Within 30 minutes, two destroyers, Nicholas and Radford, were picking up survivors of Helena. This included the wounded Carpenter, who had taken charge of several rafts. While many of the cruiser's survivors were picked up before morning, many were not saved until 11 days later.

As daylight approached, the enemy was in range once more, and again, destroyers Nicholas and Radford broke off their rescue operations to pursue. Anticipating an air attack, the destroyers withdrew for Tulagi, carrying with them all but about 275 of the survivors.

For those who remained, they left four boats, manned by volunteers from the destroyers' crews, to collect those still in the water. Captain Charles Purcell Cecil, Helena's commanding officer, organized a small flotilla of three motor whaleboats, each towing a life raft, carrying 88 men to a small island about 7 miles from Rice Anchorage after a laborious all-day passage. This group was rescued the next morning by destroyers Gwin and Woodworth.

For the second group of nearly 200, the bow of Helena was their life raft, but it was slowly sinking. Disaster was staved off by a Navy PB4Y-1 (B-24) Liberator that dropped lifejackets and four rubber lifeboats. The wounded were placed aboard the lifeboats, while the able-bodied surrounded the boats and did their best to propel themselves toward nearby Kolombangara. But wind and current carried them ever further into enemy waters. Through the torturous day that followed, many of the wounded died. American search planes missed the tragic little fleet, and Kolombangara gradually faded away to leeward. Another night passed, and in the morning, the island of Vella Lavella loomed ahead. It seemed like the last chance for Helena's men, and so they headed for it. By dawn, survivors in all three remaining boats observed land 1 nmi (1.2 mi; 1.9 km), distant and all who were left were safely landed. Two coastwatchers and loyal natives cared for the survivors as best they could and radioed news of them to Guadalcanal. The 165 remaining crew members of Helena then took to the jungle to evade Japanese patrols.

Surface vessels were chosen for the final rescue. Nicholas and Radford, augmented by Jenkins and O'Bannon, set off on July 15 to sail further up the Slot than ever before, screening the movements of two destroyer transports and four other destroyers. During the night of July 16, the rescue force brought out the 165 Helena men, along with 16 Chinese who had been in hiding on the island. Of Helena's nearly 900 men, 168 had perished. Later, during the investigation of the sinking, Carpenter and other survivors were commended for their actions.

=== USS Freestone ===
Carpenter was promoted to captain on August 3, 1944. After leave and some training, he was sent to command a brand new attack transport called the USS Freestone, a Haskell-class ship. (Note: DANFS USS Freestone)

The following, in a condensed format, reflects Carpenter's actions on the USS Freestone. It is from the official history of the USS Freestone, written in 1946.

On November 8, 1944, the official Navy acceptance board to accept USS Freestone invited the prospective commanding officer, Captain Charles L. Carpenter, USN, to attend the river and acceptance runs. The ship passed its testing and was recommended for acceptance by the Navy. The ship docked at the starboard side of Pier #3, U.S. Naval Station, Astoria, Oregon. At 09:30 the next day, the ship was placed into commission. Captain Carpenter assumed command and ordered the watch set. On November 20, the ship set out to sea, conducting training and drills to prepare for war service. On January 8, 1945, the ship sailed from San Diego to embark 1471 troops en route to Saipan, Mariana Islands. The small task force, Task Unit 96.3.18, with Captain Carpenter commanding, arrived on February 6 and debarked the troops.

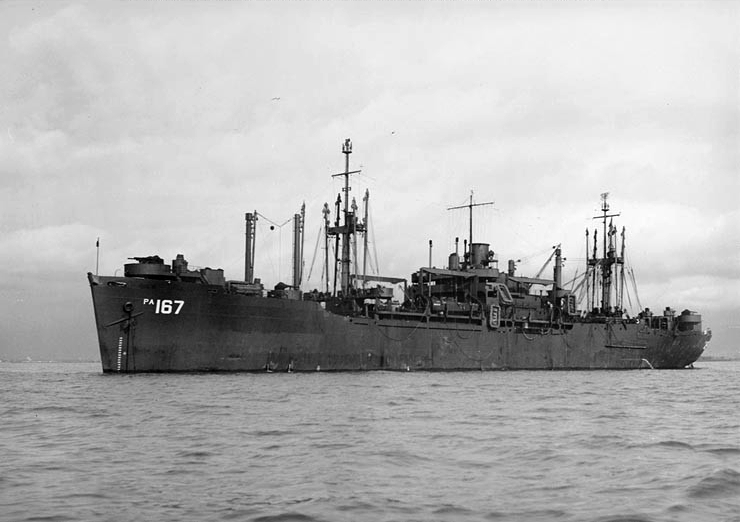

On February 28, 1945, the ship arrived in Leyte Gulf, in the Philippine Islands, where they were alerted to Japanese air attacks. After more training, Carpenter and his ship loaded members of the 184th Infantry and a Regimental Combat Team and were assigned to Task Force 51 for the invasion of Okinawa. They arrived there on April 1 and, within seven days, completed their mission by debarking their troops and supplies. During several Japanese air raids and kamikaze attacks, the Freestone was credited with shooting down one enemy aircraft.

The ship's medical department received battle casualties, and the majority of those departed with the ship and were taken to the hospital in Guam. Carpenter then took his ship, under orders, back to the West Coast of the United States and then back to the Philippines, transporting personnel and supplies. During dry dock repairs and alterations to prepare for the invasion of mainland Japan, the ship received word of the atomic bombings of Hiroshima and Nagasaki in Japan. Work was suspended for two days for the celebration of VJ Day (Victory over Japan Day).

Captain Carpenter took his ship to Nagasaki, Japan, to deliver occupation troops. Later, they were assigned to Operation Magic Carpet and began shuttle runs back to the United States for troops being sent home. On November 10, 1945, Carpenter was reassigned and said goodbye to the officers and crew of the USS Freestone.

== Post war ==
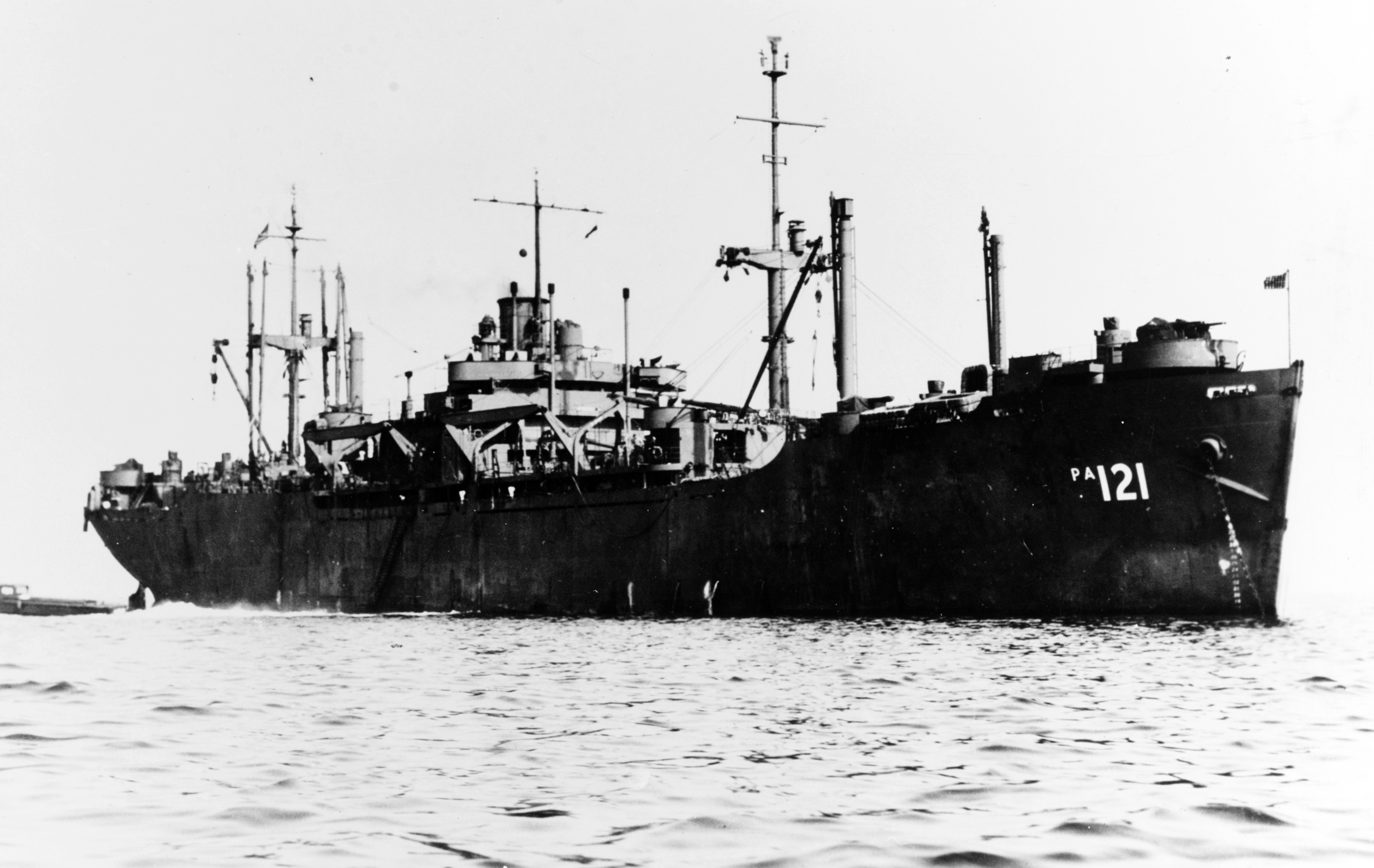
USS Hocking at anchor in late 1945.

For his service during the war, Carpenter was awarded a number of medals and citations, including the Purple Heart for wounds received in combat during the Battle of Kula Gulf. He became a member of the Naval Order of the United States.

=== USS Hocking ===
Carpenter was assigned to command the attack transport USS Hocking in December 1945. She was his second Haskell-class attack transport.

Hocking arrived from the Asiatic on December 5, 1945, at San Pedro, and under Carpenter, he subsequently made another voyage to Guam and the Philippines, bringing home veterans. Carpenter left the Hocking in February 1946, as she was scheduled to go into the reserves. She left San Pedro on March 1, 1946, and was returned to the Maritime Commission via the Canal Zone to Norfolk, Virginia, where she was decommissioned on May 10, 1946. Hocking joined the National Defense Reserve Fleet and was berthed in the James River, near Norfolk, on May 22, 1946. In 1974, she was scrapped. (Note: DANFS USS Hocking)

=== Shore duty ===
He left Hocking in February 1946 in the Canal Zone for assignment at Naval District 12 in San Francisco, California.

=== USS Burleson ===
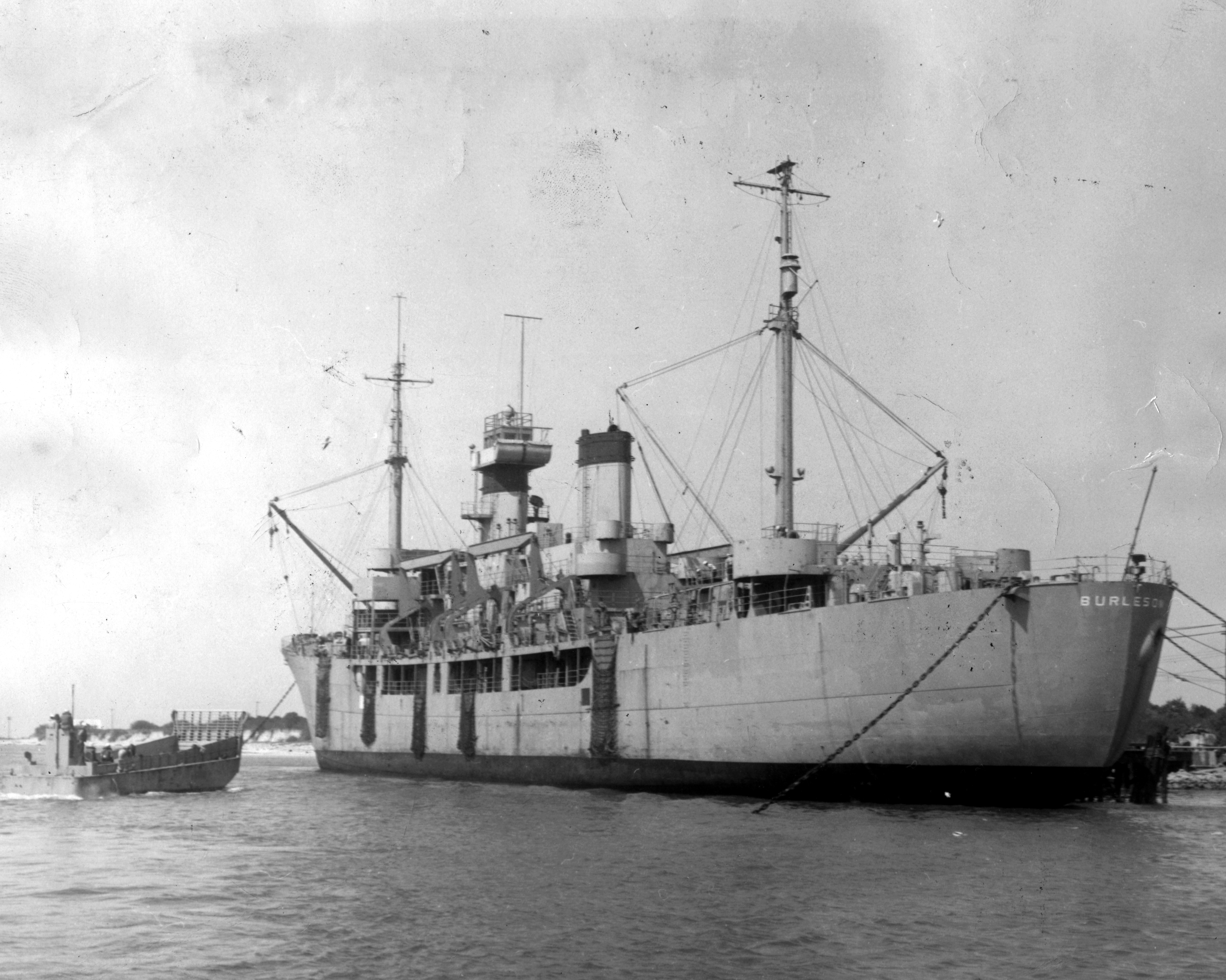
Burleson as a training ship at Little Creek in 1951.

Carpenter then became the captain of the USS Burleson, a Gilliam-class attack transport. The ship was modified as an animal research vessel in Task Group 1.1, commanded by Rear Admiral William Sterling Parsons, for the Operation Crossroads series of atomic bomb tests at Bikini Atoll.

In June 1946, Burleson moved from Pearl Harbor to Bikini, carrying animals to be used in the two nuclear tests. She was not a target vessel but a support ship. Carpenter and his ship observed both tests and moved into the test area after each to remove the animals for study. The surviving animals were observed closely, and a better understanding of radioactivity was achieved.

At the end of the summer of 1946, Burleson sailed to the East Coast of the United States. She reported for duty at the Naval Amphibious Base, Little Creek, Virginia, where she was decommissioned on November 9, 1946. In 1968, she was scrapped. (Note: DANFS USS Burleson Listed as Burlington in error on DANFs page.)

=== PhibLant & OpNav ===
Captain Carpenter was back ashore with Amphibious Forces, Atlantic Fleet (PHIBLANT), under the command of Commander, Naval Surface Force Atlantic, in 1947. Part of his job was to conduct a review of amphibious landings previously conducted. He continued his work at OpNav for the Chief of Naval Operations, then Admiral Louis E. Denfeld, until August 1949. These were administrative duties in preparation for future duties.

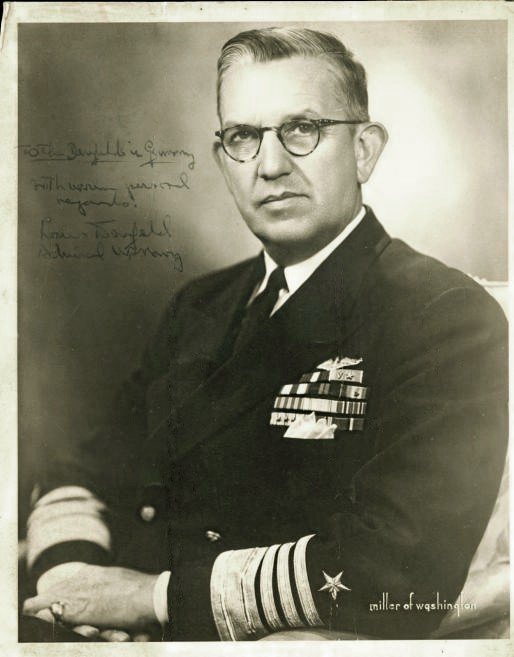
Admiral Louis Denfeld

Carpenter was present during the 1949 Revolt of the Admirals. Several United States Navy admirals, headed by Admiral Denfield, publicly disagreed with US President Harry S. Truman and the Secretary of Defense's plans for the reduction of the Navy and their new emphasis on the strategic nuclear bombing role of the Air Force as the primary means by which the nation was defended. At the time, the technologies of large jet aircraft, the nuclear bomb, and the means by which it could be delivered were in their developmental stages.

The debate climaxed during the House Armed Services Committee investigation into the inter-service rivalry held in August 1949 and focused on the allegations of fraud and corruption emanating from the "Worth Paper". The committee found no substance to charges relating to the role of the Secretary of the Air Force, Stuart Symington, in aircraft procurement. This resulted in vindication for Secretary Johnson and embarrassment for the Navy. More committees and firings continued, including Denfield. At one point, even the question of a future US Navy was in doubt.

The Truman administration essentially won the conflict with the Navy, and civilian control over the military was reaffirmed. Military budgets following the hearings prioritized the development of Air Force heavy bomber designs, accumulating a combat-ready force of over 1000 long-range strategic bombers capable of supporting nuclear mission scenarios. These were deployed across the country and at overseas bases. The Air Force portion of the total defense budget grew, while the Navy's portion of the defense budget was significantly reduced.

The wisdom of the Air Force position and the Truman administration's national doctrine were soon put to the test. Within six months, on June 25, 1950, the Korean War broke out, and the U.S. was forced to confront an invading army with the forces it had on hand. By this time, Carpenter was in Lima, Peru, at the Peruvian Naval Academy as a Technical Advisor and away from any possible career terminations.

== Later career ==
By 1951, Carpenter was stationed at Naval Headquarters in Washington, D.C., and as of April 17, 1952, he served as commodore of Destroyer Squadron 18 and had additional duties as commander of Destroyer Division 181 in the Mediterranean.

His final assignment before retiring from the Navy in 1956 was commander of the Naval Receiving Station at the Brooklyn Navy Yard.

== Post-career ==
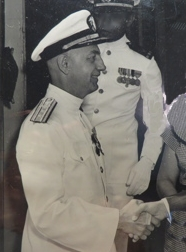
Rear Admiral Carpenter at his retirement ceremony in 1956 after 30 years of active service.

After leaving the Navy, Carpenter moved to Drexel Hill, Pennsylvania, and became the executive director of the Pennsylvania United Theological Seminary Foundation, serving as its chief fund-raiser until the early 1960s.

Memorial Chair Seat 18 in row 22 of section 2 at the Navy-Marine Corps Memorial Stadium in Annapolis, Maryland, was named in his honor thanks to his wife, "Dottie."

Carpenter was a member of numerous masonic and military orders, including the Sigma Alpha Epsilon National Collegiate Fraternity at Pitt, the New York Yacht Club, the Historical Society of Pennsylvania and Waterboro, Maine, and a communicant of the Drexel Hill, Pennsylvania United Methodist Church.

He also became interested in genealogy and traveled extensively, doing extensive research. In 1976, he published a book called The Descendants of Timothy Carpenter (1715–1787) of Pittstown, Rensselaer County, New York.

In 1978, he moved to Lima, Pennsylvania, in Delaware County. There he wrote several genealogically related articles and completed a draft of a large 813-page book, The Descendants of William Carpenter (of) Rehoboth, Bristol County, Massachusetts. This work was published in 2002 by his grandson, Chad Carpenter.

Carpenter's wife, "Dottie", died on April 25, 1973, in Philadelphia, Pennsylvania, and she was buried in South Pine Grove Cemetery in South Waterboro, Maine. "Charlie" also died in Philadelphia on February 21, 1992. He was interred next to his wife. He was survived by his son, Charles L. Carpenter Jr., a retired major of the U.S. Marines; daughter, Olivia Salzberg; and six grandchildren.

== Military awards and decorations ==

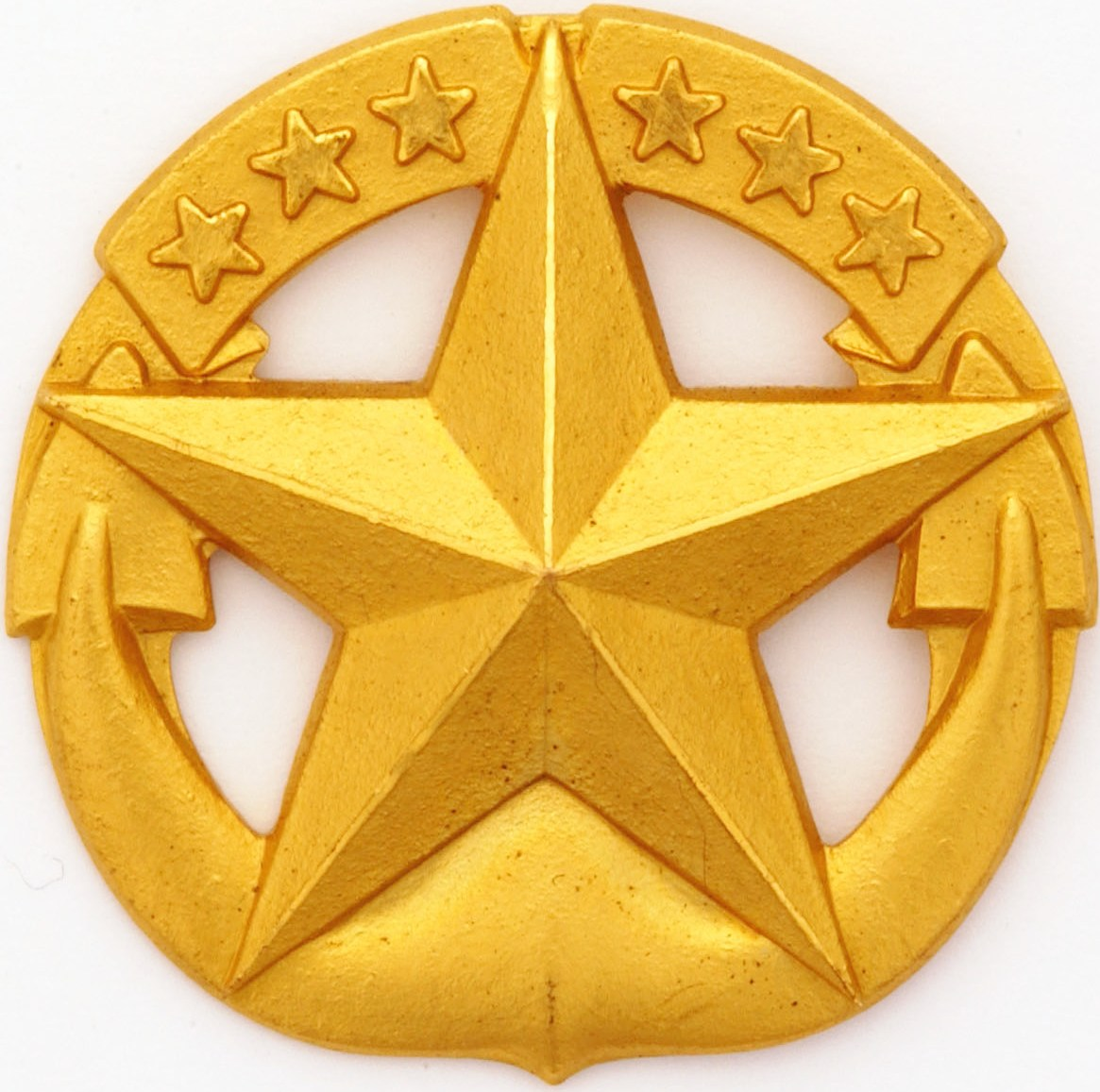
US Navy Command at Sea Insignia

	Navy Cross	
Purple Heart	Navy Unit Commendation	2nd Nicaraguan Campaign Medal
China Service Medal	American Defense Service Medal(Fleet Clasp)	American Campaign Medal
European-African-Middle Eastern Campaign Medal	Asiatic–Pacific Campaign Medal with 3 Campaign stars	World War II Victory Medal
Navy Occupation Service Medal (Asia)	National Defense Service Medal	Philippine Liberation Medal
Peruvian Navy Cross	Nicaraguan Presidential Medal of Merit w/ Silver Star	Cross of Naval Merit (Spain)
	Combat Command Insignia	

== Ranks held ==
Rear Admiral
O-7

January 12, 1956

Captain	Commander	Lieutenant Commander	Lieutenant	Lieutenant j.g.	Ensign
O-6	O-5	O-4	O-3	O-2	O-1
August 1/3, 1943	August 15, 1942	July 1, 1941	June 30, 1936	June 3, 1929	June 26, 1926

== Ships served on ==
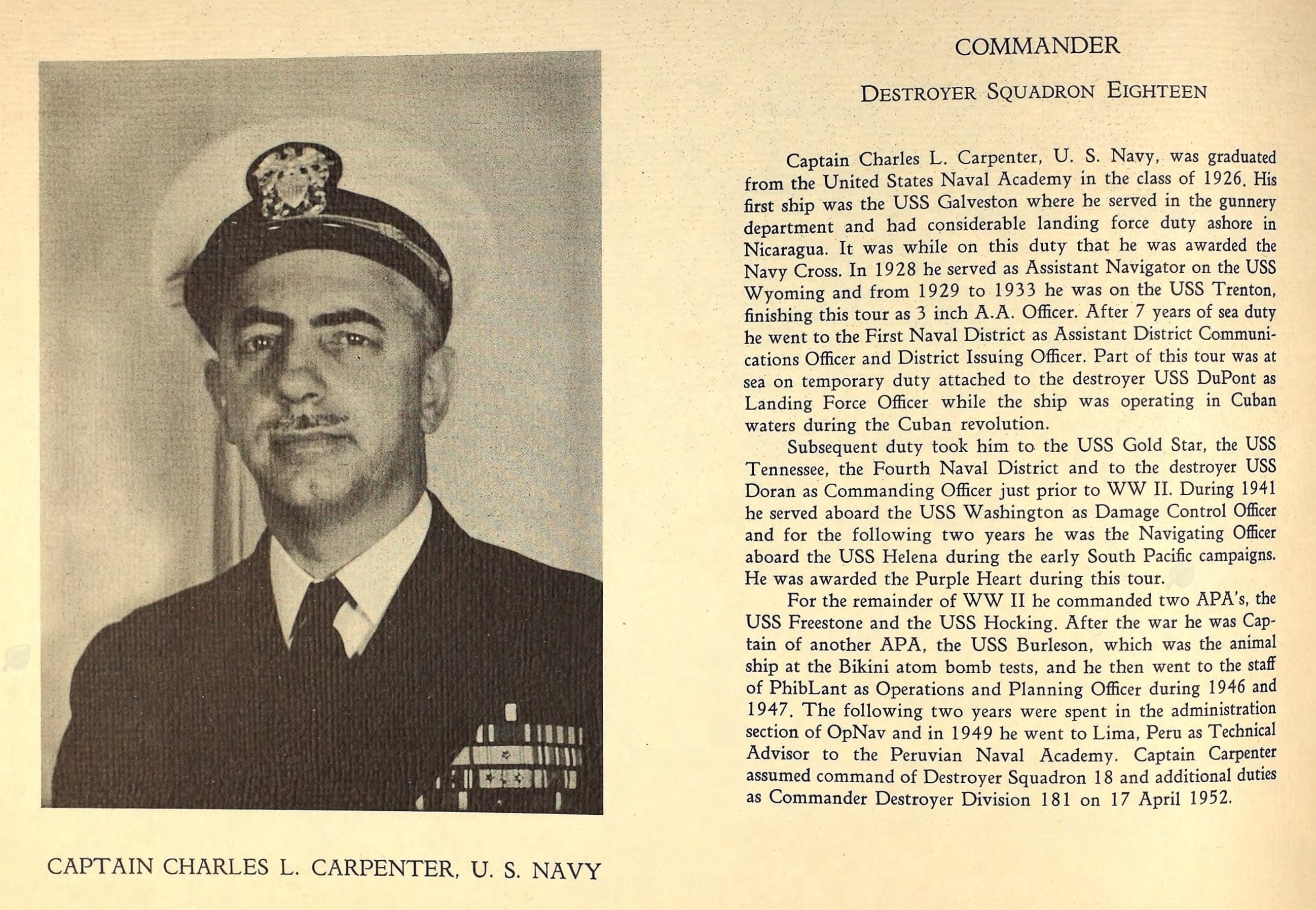

- USS Galveston (CL-19), 1926–1927, Gunnery Department, with shore duty in Nicaragua
- USS Wyoming (BB-32), 1928, Assistant Navigator
- USS Trenton (CL-11), 1929–1933, Anti-Aircraft Officer
- USS DuPont (DD-152), 1933–1934, Landing Force Officer, on patrol off Cuba
- USS Gold Star (AK-12)
- USS Tennessee (BB-43)
- USS Doran (DD-634), commanding officer
- USS Washington (BB-56), 1941, damage control officer
- USS Helena (CL-50), 1942–1943, navigating officer
- USS Freestone (APA-167), 1943–1944, commanding officer
- USS Hocking (APA-121), 1944–1945, commanding officer
- USS Burleson (APA-67), 1946, commanding officer

== Video ==
- Video of USS Helena survivors at the funeral of Irwin Edwards, who succumbed to his wounds after being rescued. Admiral Walden L. Ainsworth, with cap, shakes the hands of the survivors. This includes Commander Charles L. Carpenter, with mustache, senior rescued officer. Aboard the USS Honolulu, dated July 7, 1943.
- Commander Charles L. Carpenter, center with mustache, at the head of the gangplank as USS Helena survivors are transferred to another ship. Dated July 7, 1943.

== See also ==
- List of people from Pennsylvania
- List of people with surname Carpenter

== Ship notes ==
DANFS references reflect Dictionary of American Naval Fighting Ships histories.
