= I23 =

I23 may refer to:

- HMS Albatross (I23)
- HMS Castleton (I23)
- I23 (space group), number 197
