= USS Du Pont (DD-152) =

Wickes-class destroyer

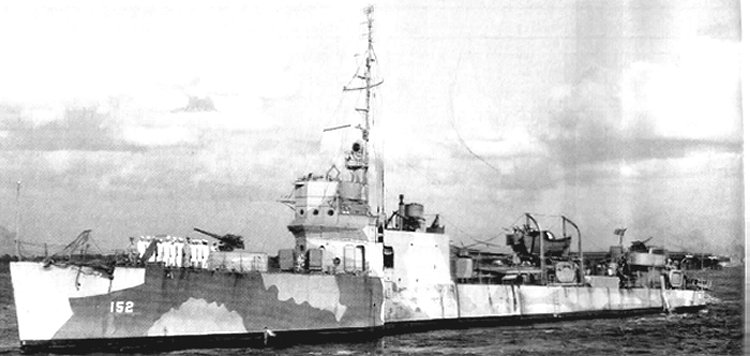
- USS Du Pont (DD-152)

History

United States
- Name: USS Du Pont (DD-152)
- Namesake: Samuel Francis Du Pont
- Builder: William Cramp & Sons, Philadelphia, Pennsylvania
- Yard number: 467
- Laid down: 2 May 1918
- Launched: 22 October 1918
- Commissioned: 30 April 1919
- Decommissioned: 19 April 1922
- Recommissioned: 1 May 1930
- Decommissioned: 14 January 1937
- Commissioned: 16 October 1939
- Decommissioned: 2 May 1946
- Reclassified: Miscellaneous auxiliary, AG-80, 25 September 1944
- Stricken: 5 June 1946
- Honors and awards: Presidential Unit Citation; Three battle stars for World War II
- Fate: Sold for scrapping 12 March 1947

General characteristics
- Class & type: Wickes-class destroyer
- Displacement: 1,090 tons
- Length: 314 ft 5 in (95.83 m)
- Beam: 31 ft 8 in (9.65 m)
- Draft: 8 ft 8 in (2.64 m)
- Speed: 35 knots (65 km/h)
- Complement: 101 officers and enlisted
- Armament: 4 × 4 in (102 mm)/50 guns, 2 × 3 in (76 mm)/23 guns, 4 × 21-inch (533 mm) torpedo tubes

USS Du Pont (DD–152) was a Wickes-class destroyer in the United States Navy during World War II, later reclassified as AG-80. She was the second ship named for Rear Admiral Samuel Francis Du Pont.

== Construction and commissioning ==
Du Pont was launched 22 October 1918 by William Cramp & Sons Ship and Engine Building Company, Philadelphia; sponsored by Miss C. S. Du Pont, great-grandniece of Rear Admiral Du Pont; and commissioned 30 April 1919.

== Service history ==
Du Pont sailed from Newport 6 May 1919 to patrol off the Azores during the historic first transatlantic airplane flight, made by Navy seaplanes, then visited Brest, France, before returning to New York 15 June. She sailed 10 July for the Mediterranean and on the 27th reported to Commander, U.S. Naval Forces, European Waters, at Constantinople, Turkey. She carried mail and passengers in connection with relief in eastern Europe, and investigated conditions in Lebanon, Syria, Egypt, and Greece. Returning to New York 21 July 1920, she was placed in reserve and operated with 50 percent of her complement in training duty along the Atlantic coast until placed out of commission at Philadelphia 19 April 1922.

Recommissioned 1 May 1930, Du Pont operated along the east coast and in the Caribbean, in practice and exercises and on reserve training cruises. Between 13 March and 29 March 1931 she escorted Arizona with President H. C. Hoover embarked for visits to Ponce, Puerto Rico, and St. Thomas, Virgin Islands, then returned to tactical exercises with the fleet and occasional duty as a plane guard.

Between 9 January and 22 October 1932, Du Pont cruised to the west coast, returning to Norfolk to join Rotating Reserve Squadron 19. She operated from Boston training Naval Reservists until assigned temporary duty on patrol off Cuba from September 1933 until February 1934.

On 15 August 1934, Du Pont returned to active commission. She left Charleston, South Carolina, 15 September, served as target vessel and plane guard in the Caribbean, then arrived at San Diego 9 November. Based there she served in training and tactical development with the fleet, cruising to Alaskan waters and Pearl Harbor on a problem during 29 April 1935 – 10 June 1935. She sailed from the west coast 27 April 1936 for the annual fleet problem held that year in the Canal Zone, then transited the Panama Canal, and arrived at Jacksonville, Florida, 7 June for Naval Reserve training duty along the east coast. Arriving at Philadelphia Navy Yard 29 September 1936, Du Pont was placed out of commission 14 January 1937.

=== World War II ===
With the outbreak of war in Europe, Du Pont was recommissioned 16 October 1939 for duty on the Neutrality Patrol. She patrolled along the east coast, trained reservists, and spent several periods training with submarines out of New London. Between 7 July 1941 and 26 February 1942, she escorted five vital convoys to NS Argentia, Newfoundland, and Iceland, continuing escort and antisubmarine patrol duty in the Atlantic as far north as Argentia and south to the Caribbean. Du Pont, 15 March 1942, rescued 30 survivors from a torpedoed merchantman. From 8 May 1942 to 19 January 1943, she guarded convoys from New York and Norfolk to Key West and Guantanamo Bay.

After overhaul, Du Pont returned to the Caribbean to escort tanker convoys between Aruba, Netherlands West Indies, and Guantanamo Bay until 17 May 1943 when she sailed from Aruba to the Mediterranean. She arrived at Algiers, Algeria, 1 June, and put into Casablanca 5 days later. The destroyer sailed on 9 June for New York in the escort for Card, rescuing four men from downed aircraft during hunter-killer operations en route. She arrived at New York 6 July.

Between 17 July and 12 September 1943, Du Pont made two voyages to the United Kingdom on convoy escort duty. On 25 September, she sailed from Norfolk for an antisubmarine patrol with a hunter-killer group centered on Card. On 6 October she joined the screen for Bogue during exercises in Casco Bay and Long Island Sound. The group sailed from Norfolk 14 November to give close support to a Gibraltar-bound convoy. On the return passage one of Bogue's planes sighted and bombed surfaced U-172, 12 December. Du Pont and George E. Badger continued the attack, driving the submarine to the surface on the morning of the following day. The destroyers opened fire and after the submarine's conning tower exploded, rescued 46 survivors including the captain as U-172 sank in 26°19′N 29°58′W. Du Pont shared in the Presidential Unit Citation awarded the Bogue task group for distinguished success in operations against submarines.

Du Pont escorted a convoy to Gibraltar and back to Boston between 25 January and 9 March 1944, and then returned to escort duty in the Caribbean. She left Norfolk 11 June in the screen of Albemarle sailing by way of Casablanca to Avonmouth, England, arriving 28 June. Du Pont returned to Boston 13 July with Albemarle who was carrying casualties from the Normandy invasion.

"Du Pont" was based in Norfolk during September 1944 when she sailed for anti-submarine duties off Cape Hatteras. She was caught in the Great Hurricane of 1944, which resulted in the loss of USS Warrington, USCGC Jackson and USCGC Bedloe. "Du Pont" survived the hurricane, but was heavily damaged. She limped into Charleston Navy Yard where it was determined that "Du Pont" would be reclassified as an auxiliary, AG-80.

== Convoys escorted ==
Convoy	Escort Group	Dates	Notes
HX 153		7-13 Oct 1941	from Newfoundland to Iceland prior to US declaration of war
ON 28		25 Oct – 3 Nov 1941	from Iceland to Newfoundland prior to US declaration of war
HX 161		23-25 Nov 1941	from Newfoundland to Iceland prior to US declaration of war
ON 43		11-15 Dec 1941	from Iceland to Newfoundland
HX 172		28 Jan-2 Feb Feb 1942	from Newfoundland to Iceland
ON 65		12-19 Feb 1942	from Iceland to Newfoundland

== Auxiliary service ==
After overhaul and refresher training, Du Pont put into Charleston Navy Yard 16 September 1944 to undergo conversion to an auxiliary vessel. Reclassified AG-80, 25 September 1944, she sailed from Charleston 9 October and arrived at Key West 2 days later to act as target ship for Fleet Air Wing 5. She rescued two downed aviators 24 November and 2 days later, transferred her doctor to a Norwegian merchantman to render emergency treatment. She continued to serve off Florida aiding aviation training until 1 April 1946 when she arrived at Boston. Du Pont was decommissioned 2 May 1946 and sold 12 March 1947.

== Awards ==
In addition to the Presidential Unit Citation awarded to TG 21.13, Du Pont received three battle stars for World War II service.
