= USS Gold Star =

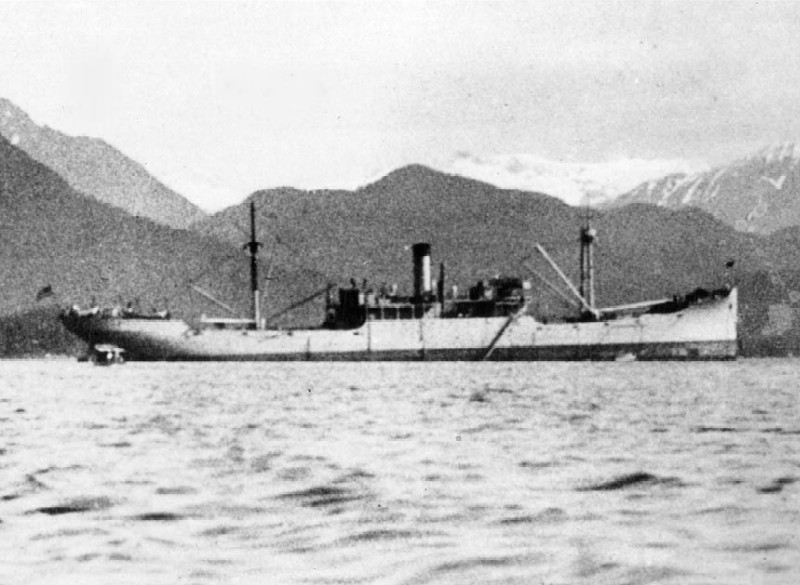
- USS Gold Star (AG-12)

History

United States
- Name: USS Arcturus
- Builder: Bethlehem Steel Wilmington (aka Harlan and Hollingsworth), Wilmington, Delaware
- Launched: 5 June 1920
- Completed: July 1920
- Acquired: 8 November 1921
- Commissioned: 1 February 1922
- Decommissioned: 17 April 1946
- Renamed: Gold Star, 6 February 1922
- Stricken: 30 June 1946
- Identification: AK-12 (February 1922); AG-12 (May 1922)
- Fate: Sold for scrapping, 1 December 1947

General characteristics
- Displacement: 4,860 tons
- Length: 391 ft 9 in (119.41 m)
- Beam: 52 ft 2 in (15.90 m)
- Draft: 24 feet
- Installed power: 2,000 hp (1,500 kW)
- Propulsion: 3 coal-fired boilers, reciprocating engine, single shaft
- Speed: 12 knots (22 km/h)
- Complement: 52
- Armament: 2 × 4 in (102 mm) guns; 2 × 0.5 in (12.7 mm) machine guns; 1 × 12-pdr. HA gun; 2 × 5 in (127 mm) guns; 4 × 3 in (76 mm) guns

USS Gold Star (AK-12) was a U.S. Navy cargo ship that saw service before and during World War II. She was responsible for delivering necessary goods and equipment to ships and stations in the war zone.

== Renamed Gold Star ==
Gold Star (AK-12) was built in 1920 by Bethlehem Shipbuilding Corp., Wilmington, Delaware: taken over by the Navy as Arcturus from the USSB on 8 November [1921]; commissioned as Arcturus (AK-12) on 1 February 1922 at Philadelphia, Pennsylvania, and five days later renamed Gold Star (AK-12) on 6 February. The ship was reclassified AG-12, 12 May 1922.

== Post-World War I operations ==
Renamed Gold Star sailed from Philadelphia 18 March 1922, arriving Seattle, Washington, 1 July via the Panama Canal Zone and California ports. During the next two years she served as a cargo ship on the United States West Coast, making three voyages with supplies for radio stations in the Territory of Alaska. The ship steamed out of San Francisco, California, 9 October 1924 to assume her duties as station ship at Guam, arriving 3 November 1924.

== An Asia specialist ==
During the 1920s and 1930s Gold Star became a familiar sight in the far-flung ports of Asia. Though assigned as flagship of the US Navy at Guam she made frequent voyages to Japan, China, and the Philippines with cargo and passengers. Prior to World War II, much of her crew was made up of Chamorro, natives of Guam with American non-commissioned officers and commissioned officers.

Gold Star became a spy ship by taking on a communications intelligence mission as she moved from port to port in the Orient. As a station ship she was assigned to monitor 1) Internal Japanese Fleet frequencies 2) Frequencies measurements and DF or direction finder azimuths. She had three intercept operators and one chief radioman supervised by an officer. This all started in 1933 during the reconstruction of the Japanese fleet by Tokyo and continued into the summer of 1941. Gold Star along with ground stations at Guam, Olongapo and Beijing provided significant intelligence before the Japanese attack on Pearl Harbor on 7 December 1941.

== In the Philippines when World War II started ==
When the Japanese attacked Pearl Harbor on 7 December 1941, Gold Star was coaling at Malangas, Philippine Islands. She sailed for Manila 8 December, but was ordered by commander, Asiatic Fleet, to proceed to Balikpapan, Borneo. She arrived 14 December as the Japanese advanced quickly southward; and after issuing urgently needed provisions to units of the Asiatic Fleet there, steamed by way of Macassar, Celebes, to Darwin, Australia. Following her arrival at Darwin on 28 December, Gold Star served as a coastal cargo carrier, steaming between such Australian ports as Brisbane, Sydney, and Fremantle. She thus contributed importantly to strengthening Australia and to checking the Japanese advance in New Guinea. After 15 August 1943 the ship continued her coastal operations in Australia, but also began a series of cargo voyages to New Guinea and the Admiralty Islands. Gold Star brought many loads of vital supplies to Milne Bay as the Allies began the push toward the Philippines.

== Supporting American invasion forces ==
The ship arrived Manus Island on 6 January 1945 for repairs and conversion to squadron flagship for Service Squadron 9. Operating in this capacity the vessel supported the mounting American advance toward Japan, sailing to Leyte and Morotai. While conducting cargo operations at Morotai on 28 June Gold Star was attacked by enemy aircraft but sustained no damage. She arrived Manila 26 July via Tawitawi and remained there issuing supplies until the surrender of Japan on 15 August 1945.

== End-of-war activity ==
After supporting occupation forces in Japan, Gold Star sailed to Seattle, Washington, in February 1946 and decommissioned there on 17 April 1946. She had served over 21 years in the Western Pacific Ocean without once returning to the United States, and had carried countless tons of supplies, items large and small, for the warships of the fleet. The old ship was delivered to the Maritime Commission 30 June 1946, and was sold for scrap on 1 December 1947 to Dulien Steel Products, Inc.

== Military awards and honors ==
Gold Star received one battle star for World War II service. Her crew members were entitled to the following medals:

- Combat Action Ribbon (28JUN45)
- American Defense Service Medal (with Fleet Clasp)
- Asiatic-Pacific Campaign Medal (1)
- World War II Victory Medal
- Navy Occupation Service Medal (with Asia Clasp)
