= USS Hocking =

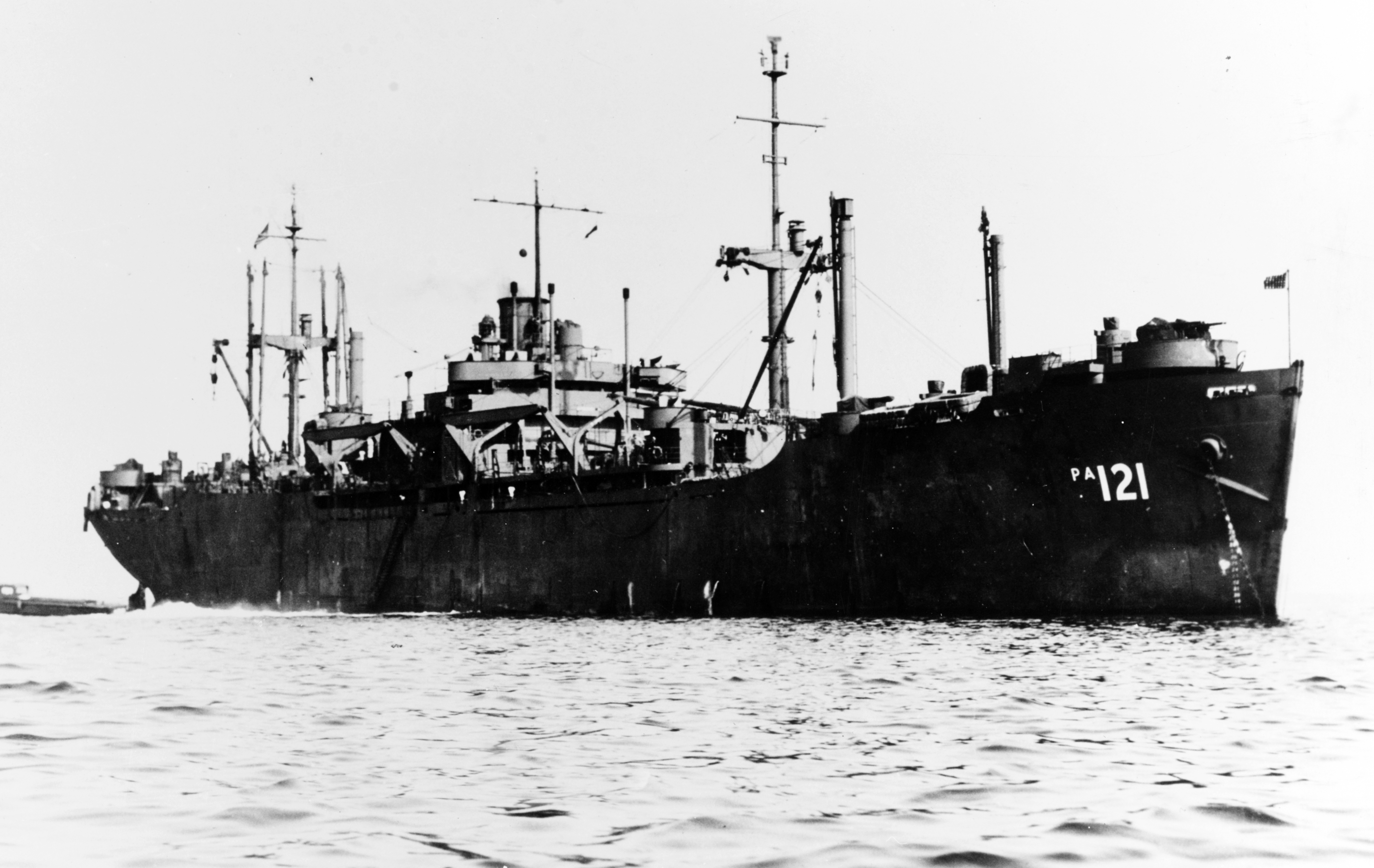

History

United States
- Name: USS Hocking
- Namesake: Hocking County, Ohio
- Owner: US Navy
- Operator: US Navy
- Builder: California Shipbuilding Corporation
- Laid down: 7 June 1944
- Launched: 25 July 1944
- Completed: 31 August 1944
- Commissioned: 22 October 1944
- Decommissioned: 10 May 1946
- Identification: AKA-121
- Honors and awards: 2 Battle stars
- Fate: Scrapped 1974

General characteristics
- Class & type: Haskell-class attack transport
- Displacement: 6,873 tons (lt), 14,837 t (fl)
- Length: 455 ft (139 m)
- Beam: 62 ft (19 m)
- Draft: 24 ft (7 m)
- Propulsion: 1 × geared turbine, 2 × header-type boilers, 1 × propeller, designed 8,500 shp (6,338 kW)
- Speed: 17 knots (31 km/h; 20 mph)
- Boats & landing craft carried: 2 × LCM; 12 × LCVP; 3 × LCPL
- Capacity: Troops: 86 officers, 1,475 enlisted; Cargo: 150,000 cu ft, 2,900 tons
- Complement: 56 officers, 480 enlisted
- Armament: 1 × 5"/38 dual-purpose gun; 4 × twin 40mm guns; 10 × single 20mm guns; late armament, add 1 × 40mm quad mount

USS Hocking (APA-121) was a Haskell-class attack transport in service with the United States Navy from 1944 to 1946, including participating in the Iwo Jima invasion. She was scrapped in 1974.

== History ==
Hocking was built and used during World War II. She was of the VC2-S-AP5 Victory ship design type. Hocking was named for Hocking County, Ohio.

Hocking was launched under Maritime Commission contract by California Shipbuilding Corporation, Wilmington, California, 6 August 1944; sponsored by Miss Frances Sims; acquired by the Navy on a loan-charter basis and commissioned 22 October 1944.

The new transport conducted shakedown and training exercises off California, departing for Pearl Harbor 4 December to join U.S. forces in the giant amphibious sweep across the Pacific. After her arrival at Pearl Harbor 10 December, Hocking embarked Marines and took part in amphibious exercises and rehearsal preparatory to the Iwo Jima invasion, destined to be one of the most important and hard-fought of the war. She joined the vast armada of transports 27 January 1945 en route to Eniwetok and after a stopover at that island base arrived in Iwo Jima on 19 February. There Hocking debarked her troops and unloaded equipment in the early waves of the assault. She then anchored offshore, received casualties, and departed 27 February for Saipan, where she arrived 2 March.

With the Iwo Jima campaign underway, thoughts were turned to the next major objective, Okinawa. Hocking sailed to Espiritu Santo 15 March, embarked fresh amphibious assault forces, and sailed to Okinawa by way of Ulithi. The ship arrived off Okinawa during the difficult first weeks of the fighting, 9 April. She debarked her replacement troops and their cargo, and again received battle casualties for transportation out of the forward area. Hocking departed 14 April for Saipan and Ulithi, and arrived Marianas 7 May to load troops at Tinian. These were transported to Okinawa and landed 27 May, after which the transport again carried casualties from the battle-torn island. She arrived Pearl Harbor via Saipan and Eniwetok 26 June and sailed on to San Francisco, arriving 3 July.

With the war nearing its close, Hocking embarked replacement troops and sailed 20 July, stopping at Eniwetok and Ulithi before landing her troops at Okinawa 22 August. She then turned to duties connected with the occupation of former enemy territory, embarking troops at the Philippine base on Leyte 5 September and at Panay island 10 September. They were taken to Jinsen, Korea, and put ashore to aid in the peninsula occupation and transport freed prisoners of war. Hocking sailed 25 September to Luzon, bringing troops to Jinsen, and made still another passage 18 October-3 November. She got underway from Jinsen 7 November, brought troops on board two days later at Shanghai, and sailed for the United States as a unit of Operation Magic Carpet, bringing home thousands of American troops in the Pacific.

Hocking arrived San Pedro 5 December, and subsequently made another voyage to Guam and the Philippines bringing home veterans. Departing San Pedro 1 March 1946, she was designated for return to the Maritime Commission and sailed via the Canal Zone to Norfolk, Virginia, where she decommissioned 10 May. Hocking joined the National Defense Reserve Fleet and was berthed in the James River near Norfolk on 22 May.

=== Fate ===
In 1955 Hocking was withdrawn from the Reserve Fleet as part of a Repair Program, GAA-A. H. Bull, and then returned. On 7 May 1974 she was sold to Luria Brothers & Co., for $285,989, to be scrapped. At 1430 EDT, on 10 May 1974, she was withdrawn from the Reserve Fleet and sent to the breaker's yard.

== Awards ==
Hocking received two battle stars for World War II service.
