= USS Freestone =

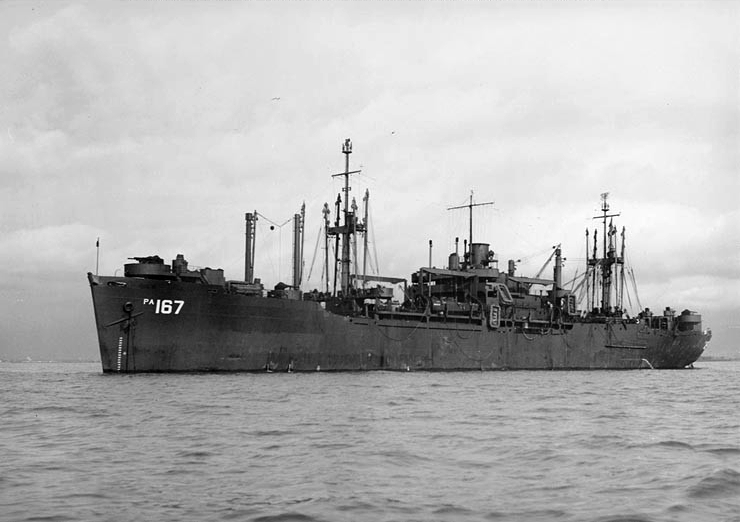

History

United States
- Name: USS Freestone
- Namesake: Freestone County, Texas
- Ordered: as type VC2-S-AP5; MCV hull 133
- Builder: Oregon Shipbuilding Corporation
- Laid down: 4 September 1944
- Launched: 9 October 1944
- Commissioned: 9 November 1944
- Decommissioned: 17 April 1946
- Stricken: 1 May 1946
- Fate: Scrapped, 1973

General characteristics
- Displacement: 12,450 tons (full load)
- Length: 455 ft 0 in (138.68 m)
- Beam: 62 ft 0 in (18.90 m)
- Draught: 24 ft 0 in (7.32 m)
- Speed: 19 knots
- Complement: 536
- Armament: one 5 in (130 mm) gun mount, twelve 40 mm gun mounts, ten 20 mm gun mounts

USS Freestone (APA-167) was a Haskell-class attack transport in service with the United States Navy from 1944 to 1946. She was scrapped in 1973.

== History ==
Freestone was launched 9 October 1944 by Oregon Shipbuilding Corporation, Portland, Oregon; sponsored by Mrs. Arthur R. Ponto; and commissioned 9 November 1944.

=== World War II ===
Freestone arrived at Pearl Harbor 14 January 1945 with passengers and cargo from the U.S. West Coast, and 6 days later sailed to land troops from Pearl Harbor on Saipan. Moving on to Ulithi, Freestone loaded U.S. Marines and their equipment and sailed to Leyte for intensive training in preparation for the Okinawa landings. She sortied from Leyte Gulf 27 March, remained in the outer transport area during the assault on 1 April, then moved close inshore to land her men in one of the later waves of landing craft. Next day she splashed a lone enemy aircraft, and on 7 April she was underway with casualties for Guam.

Continuing to San Francisco, California, Freestone arrived 11 May 1945 to embark soldiers and sailors for transportation to Manila, arriving 12 June. She voyaged to New Guinea to bring more soldiers to Manila, then sailed for the U.S. west coast with homeward bound servicemen. On two cruises to the western Pacific Ocean between 4 August and 23 December, she redeployed men and equipment in the Philippines and to Japan from various bases, returning from both cruises with servicemen eligible for discharge.

=== Decommissioning and fate ===
On 14 February 1946, she sailed from San Francisco for Norfolk, Virginia, where she was decommissioned 17 April 1946, and transferred to the War Shipping Administration 2 days later. Freestone was sold for scrapping on 9 April 1973 to Union Mineral and Alloys Corporation, New York (USA), for $111,560.00.

== Awards ==
Freestone received one battle star for World War II service.
