= Rotating Reserve =

In the United States, a number of ships whose construction was authorized during World War I entered service at a time when the post-war cutbacks in funds and personnel seriously curtailed American peacetime naval operations. The Navy established the rotating reserve to maintain a force at different levels of readiness. In practice, this system divided the force into thirds. One-third of a given force would "remain alongside" where the ship would be moored or buoyed in port, maintained by only the minimum number of personnel. The other third was half-staffed and berthed at a buoy in the harbor. The final third was also buoyed in the harbor, but was fully staffed and conducted periodic operations underway at sea.
