= Nanticoke people =

Native American people

Nanticoke
Total population
- Approximately 1,200 in 1600; 1,000 (1990)

Regions with significant populations
- United States (Delaware, New Jersey, Maryland, Oklahoma), Canada (Ontario)

Languages
- English, formerly Nanticoke language

Religion
- Native American religion, Christianity

Related ethnic groups
- Assateague, Choptank, Conoy, Patuxent, Piscataway, Pocomoke

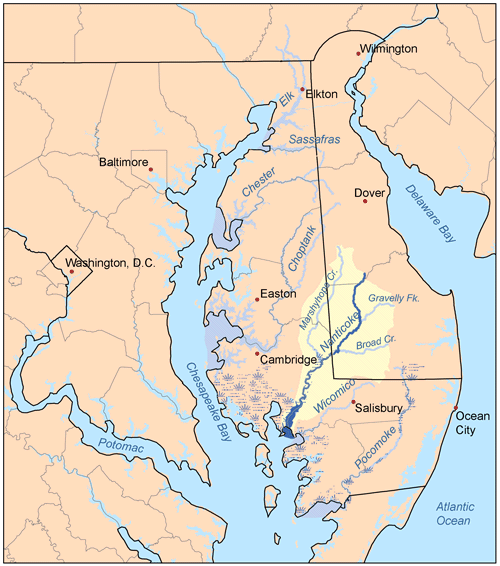
Nanticoke River

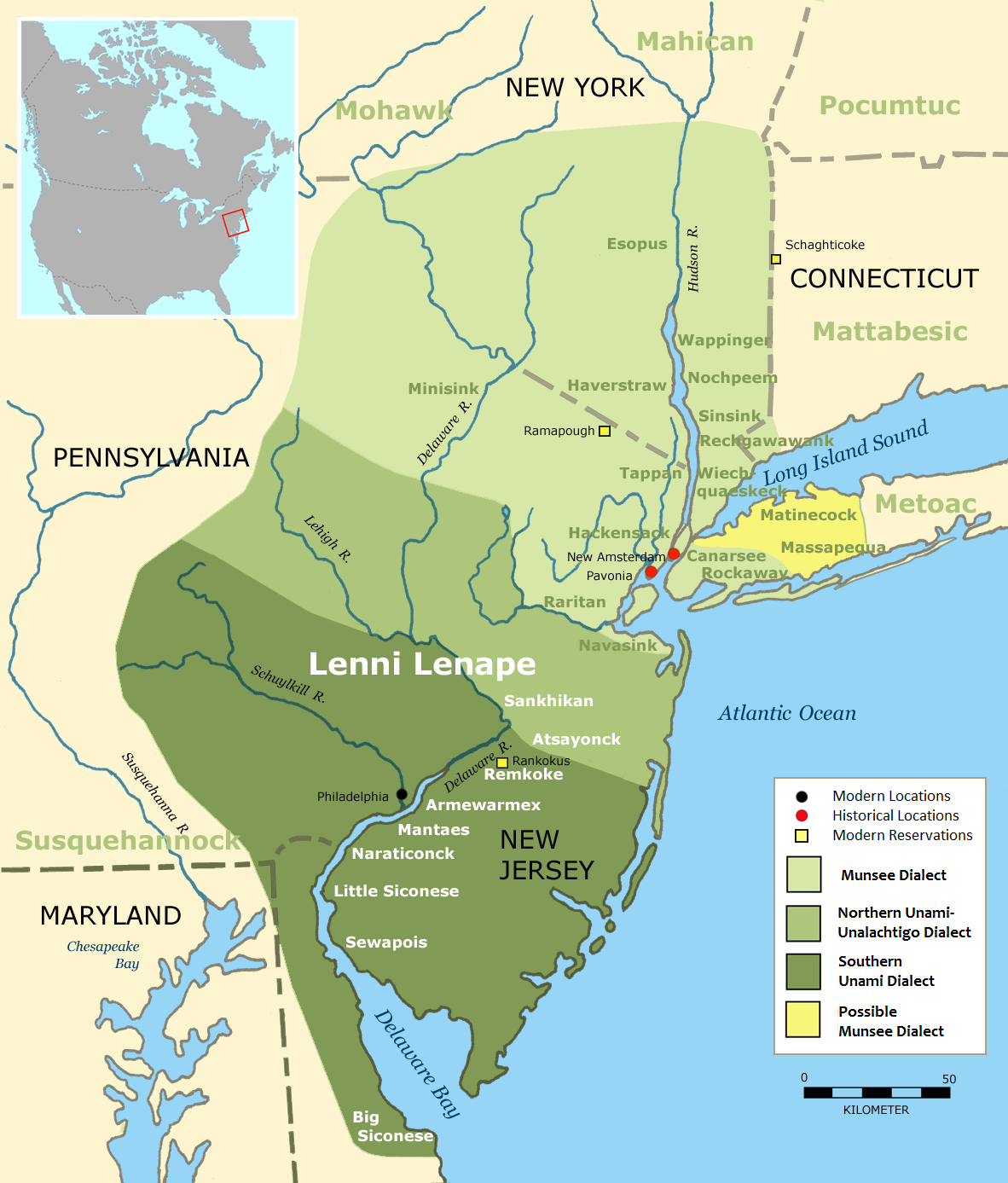
Delaware Indians

The Nanticoke people are a Native American Algonquian-speaking people, whose traditional homelands are in the Chesapeake Bay area, including Delaware. Today their descendants continue to live in Oklahoma among the Delaware Nation and the Delaware Tribe of Indians. Others now live on the Six Nations of the Grand River reserve in Ontario, Canada where some ancestors resettled after the Revolutionary War, as they had been adopted as members of the Haudenosaunee Confederacy. The Nanticoke people consisted of several tribes: the Nanticoke proper (the subject of this article), the Choptank, the Assateague, the Piscataway, and the Doeg.

== History ==
The Nanticoke people may have originated in Labrador, Canada, and migrated through the Great Lakes region and the Ohio Valley to the east, along with the Shawnee and Lenape peoples.

In 1608, the Nanticoke came into known European contact, when British captain John Smith encountered them. Through their trade of beaver pelts with the British, they made certain alliances. The Nanticoke were located primarily in what are today's Dorchester, Somerset and Wicomico counties.

In 1668, the Nanticoke emperor Unnacokasimon signed a peace treaty with the proprietary government of the Province of Maryland. In 1684, the Nanticoke and English governments defined a reservation for the Indigenous people's use, situated between Chicacoan Creek and the Nanticoke River in Maryland (see Vienna). Confronting encroachment on their land by Europeans, in 1707 the tribe purchased a 3,000-acre tract on Broad Creek in Somerset County, Maryland (now Sussex County, Delaware).

In 1742, the tribe met with neighboring tribes in nearby Wimbesoccom Neck to discuss a Shawnee plot to attack the local English settlers. When the gathering was discovered, the British arrested the leaders of the plot.

Some Nanticoke moved up to Pennsylvania in 1744, where they gained permission from the Iroquois Confederacy to settle near Wyoming, Pennsylvania, and along the Juniata River, territory of the Seneca people. The city of Nanticoke is named after one of their settlements. While settled along the Susquehanna River, the Nanticoke regularly used a path that they had established during their migration to return to the Delmarva Peninsula for seasonal gathering of fruits, nuts and roots, and fishing.

The Nanticoke moved upriver a decade later again away from European Americans. They joined the Piscataway tribe; both were under the jurisdiction of the League of the Iroquois. They sold the reservation on Broad Creek in 1768. Some Nanticoke migrated slightly north into New York, where they established a settlement in what became the town of Nanticoke there.

Members of the Conoy people joined the Nanticoke in the 1740s. Together they were neutral in the French and Indian War, although other Native American peoples allied with the French or British.

During the American Revolution, they allied with the British. In 1778, two hundred Nanticoke moved north to Fort Niagara in present-day Canada because of their alliance. Later the British resettled them at the Six Nations Reserve with Iroquois peoples, near Brantford, Ontario, Canada. The British gave them land in compensation for what they had lost to the American rebels.

Other Nanticoke stayed at Buffalo River, New York. Another group of Nanticoke joined the Lenape of the mid-Atlantic and migrated to Kansas. Decades later, in 1867 after the Civil War, they were forced to move with the Lenape to Indian Territory (what became the state of Oklahoma in the early 20th century after Native American land rights were extinguished).

Several towns and places are named for this tribe. These include Nanticoke, Pennsylvania and Nanticoke, New York, as well as Nanticoke and Nanticoke Acres, Maryland; and Nanticoke, Ontario.

== Winnesoccum Incident ==
In the early summer of 1742, members of the Nanticoke, Shawnee, and Choptank tribes, wanted to avenge themselves against the English colonists. The tribes decided to meet on Winnesoccum Island in the middle of the Pocomoke Swamp located in Maryland. Chiefs Robin Hood, Hopping Sam, Simon Alsechqueck, and Messowan gathered their people to meet in the swamp for six days where they discussed plans of attack, and related their adverse encounters with the English. As all members of the tribes, including women and children, had left their villages to gather in the swamp, colonists had become suspicious of the disappearance of the natives from their local villages.

Soldiers were sent to round up the tribal peoples in the swamp. Leaders of each of the tribes were questioned by the English. Each was said to give a different account as to why they had gathered in the swamp. Some said they gathered solely to hunt, while others said they were there to elect a new chief. The English decided that since no Indian attacks had been executed, no retaliation should be taken against the local tribes. Following the United States gaining independence, the federal government made an official treaty of peace with the tribes that was signed on July 24, 1792.

== Name ==
The Nanticoke name for themselves, their autonym, is Nentego, which means, "Tidewater People." The Nanticoke chiefdoms are now known as the Wicomoco, Monie and Manokin. They occupied areas along the rivers that were named after them.

The Nanticoke had an extensive trading network with tribes throughout the Chesapeake Bay area. Early 20th-century accounts referred to some of the Nanticoke tribes as the Arseek, Cuscarawoc, and Nause.

== Language ==
The Nanticoke language was distinct from the Algonquian languages spoken by tribes on the Western Shore of Maryland and along the Potomac River. According to the Nanticoke Indian Association, the last fluent speaker was Lydia E. Clark, who died in 1856. Efforts to revive the language have been undertaken since the late 20th century by Nanticoke Indian Association members and linguists from Georgetown University.

== Modern day ==
Today, some Nanticoke descendants are citizens of the federally recognized Six Nations of the Grand River First Nation in Ontario, Canada. They are descendants of those who traveled north after the Revolutionary War.

Descendants of those who later traveled west with the Lenape are part of the federally recognized Delaware Tribe of Indians in Oklahoma, although due to intermarriage with the Lenape these descendants do not retain a distinct tribal identity. In 1927, the anthropologist Frank Speck stated that he found 6 individuals of Nanticoke ancestry among the Delaware Tribe. By 1975, no Delaware Tribe citizens claimed a Nanticoke identity, even though some tribal citizens likely have Nanticoke ancestry.

=== State-recognized tribes ===
The Nanticoke Indian Association of Millsboro has been a state-recognized tribe in Delaware since 1922. The Nanticoke Lenni-Lenape Indians are a state-recognized tribe in New Jersey. Neither is federally recognized by the US.

==== Nanticoke Indian Association ====
The Nanticoke Indian Association, with 31 official members, was recognized in 1881 as a legal entity by the state of Delaware. This group was known as the "Incorporated Body". They have their headquarters in Millsboro.

In 1922 they were chartered as a non-profit organization. They organized annual powwows, carrying them on until the mid-1930s, during the Great Depression. In 1977 the tribe revived the annual event. Later they built a museum in Millsboro in honor of their heritage, to teach their children and other Americans.

Today all persons seeking membership in the Nanticoke Indian Association must prove descent from the original 31 members of the Incorporated Body, who shared a total of eight surnames. Those eight surnames were: Clark, Harmon, Norwood, Wright, Johnson, Street, Kimmey, and Drain. Today there are more than 700 members.

After having long been forced off most of their lands, like other East Coast tribes, the Nanticoke have taken steps to regain ancestral lands. They acquired 30 acres in Millsboro in the fall of 2021.

Sites listed on the National Register of Historic Places in 1979, and associated with the Indian River Community, include: the Robert Davis Farmhouse, Harmon School, Isaac Harmon Farmhouse, Harmony Church, Ames Hitchens Chicken Farm, Indian Mission Church, Indian Mission School, Johnson School, Coursey and Daisey Indian Burial Ground and Warren T. Wright Farmhouse Site.

In 2002 Kenneth S. "Red Deer" Clark Sr., the head chief of the association, and Assistant Chief, his son "Little Owl" Clark, resigned.

"Tee" Norwood was elected chief and served until 2008. That year Larry Jackson was elected as chief. Chief William H. "Thunder Eagle" Daisey led the organization until 2016. Natosha Carmine was elected as chief in 2016 and served until 2023. As of 2023, Lavery "Leaving Tracks" Johnson is chief of the association.

==== Nanticoke Lenni-Lenape Tribal Nation ====
Some Nanticoke settled across the Delaware Bay in southern New Jersey, where they joined the Lenape and intermarried with them, forming what is known as the Nanticoke Lenni-Lenape Tribal Nation. They had long been without any of their historic lands. In August 2023, the Native American Advancement Corporation, affiliated with the state-recognized tribe, acquired 63 acres in Salem County, New Jersey, which had been ancestral territory of the Cohanzick Lenape.

Officially known as the Nanticoke Lenni-Lenape Tribal Nation of New Jersey, they are recognized by that state. They are based in Bridgeton. After years of intermarriage, numerous members have mixed Nanticoke and Lenape ancestry. Both tribes were historically Algonquian speaking.

== See also ==
- Doeg people
- Indigenous peoples of Maryland
- Nacotchtank
- Unalachtigo Lenape
