= Harmon School =

Harmon School may refer to:

- Harmon School (Millsboro, Delaware), listed on the National Register of Historic Places in Sussex County, Delaware
- Harmon School (Fallon, Nevada), listed on the National Register of Historic Places in Churchill County, Nevada
