= Warren T. Wright Farmhouse Site =

Archaeological site in Delaware, United States

- U.S. National Register of Historic Places
- Nearest city: Millsboro, Delaware
- Area: 1 acre (0.40 ha)
- Built: 1900
- MPS: Nanticoke Indian Community TR
- NRHP reference No.: 79003310
- Added to NRHP: April 26, 1979

Warren T. Wright Farmhouse Site is a historic archaeological site located near Millsboro, Sussex County, Delaware. It once included a farmhouse similar to the nearby Robert Davis Farmhouse, but this was destroyed by a fire in the 1970s. The remains are partially visible. Warren Wright was a leader in the separtist movement during the period of the Indian River Nanticoke Indian Association community, whereby some people descended from the Delaware Moors sought to be recognized as Nanticoke people rather than as Black people.

It was added to the National Register of Historic Places in 1979.
