= Mark Quiet Hawk Gould =

American politician

- Occupations: Politician; Businessman

Mark Quiet Hawk Gould is a Leni Lenape politician and businessman who serves as Chief of the Nanticoke Lenni-Lenape Tribal Nation and Vice-President of the Native American Advancement Corporation. The son of Marion Strong Medicine Gould and Wilbur Wise Fox Gould, Gould grew up while the tribe was in hiding from United States assimilation and forced removal policies that led to many of the Lenape being removed to Oklahoma. In the 1970s, during the Native American civil rights movement, he and a group of others publicly reorganised the tribe and came out of hiding, incorporating the Nanticoke Lenni-Lenape Tribal Nation as a legal entity in 1978. The Nation quickly became one of the "largest and most vibrant" Lenape groups on their traditional land, and was formally recognized by the state of New Jersey in 1982.
