= Harry E. Yarnell =

American naval officer

Harry Ervin Yarnell
- Admiral Harry E. Yarnell
- Born: October 18, 1875 near Independence, Iowa, U.S.
- Died: July 7, 1959 (aged 83); Newport, Rhode Island, U.S.
- Relatives: VADM John Sylvester (son-in-law)
- Military career
- Allegiance: United States of America
- Branch: United States Navy
- Service years: 1898–1944
- Rank: Admiral
- Commands: USS Dale (DD-4); USS Saratoga (CV-3); Asiatic Fleet
- Conflicts: Spanish–American War; World War I; World War II
- Awards: Navy Cross; Navy Distinguished Service Medal

Admiral Harry Ervin Yarnell (18 October 1875 – 7 July 1959) was an American naval officer whose career spanned over 51 years and three wars, from the Spanish–American War through World War II.

Among his achievements was proving, in 1932 war games, that Pearl Harbor was vulnerable to a naval aerial attack. His findings were dismissed by his superiors until the Imperial Japanese Navy's Pearl Harbor attack went just as Yarnell had predicted.

== Early life and Naval career ==
Born near Independence, Iowa, he entered the U.S. Naval Academy in 1893. After serving on USS Oregon (BB-3) during the Battle of Santiago de Cuba, 3 July 1898, Yarnell was commissioned ensign 1 July 1899 and reported to the Asiatic Station. He served in the Philippines during the Philippine–American War and with the Asiatic Squadron during the Boxer Rebellion. In 1902, he was the commissioning commanding officer of the destroyer USS Dale.

== Assignments through World War I ==
From Asia, Yarnell reported to USS Connecticut (BB-18) at her commissioning. On January 13, 1907, he was the officer of the deck when Connecticut ran aground near Culebra, Puerto Rico. Both Yarnell and Connecticut captain William Swift were court-martialed; Swift was convicted but Yarnell was acquitted. Restored to duty, Yarnell sailed around the world with the Great White Fleet.

Next, duty at the Newport Torpedo Station, on CINCLANT's staff, and at the Naval War College occupied him until World War I (WWI), when he served at Gibraltar and then at London, on the staff of Admiral William S. Sims.

At the conclusion of WWI, CAPT Yarnell was awarded the Navy Cross, for his "distinguished services in the ... Office of the Chief of Naval Operations, and on the Staff of the Commander, U.S. Naval Forces operating in European waters".

== Interwar assignments ==
Yarnell then rotated between sea and shore duty until ordered to the aircraft carrier USS Saratoga in September 1927, as prospective commanding officer. He served as captain of the carrier from her commissioning until 17 August 1928, when he was appointed Chief of the Bureau of Steam Engineering as Rear Admiral. While in that capacity, advising the General Board on the design of a fleet submarine, Yarnell opposed smaller types, presciently noting, "our prospective opponent [Japan] has always started operations by attacking before a declaration of war".

From January to April 1930, Admiral Yarnell was Naval Adviser to the American delegation at the London Naval Conference 1930, and, in October 1936, he became Commander in Chief, Asiatic Fleet, with the rank of admiral.

In February 1932, Yarnell pioneered carrier tactics in an exercise called Army/Navy Grand Joint Exercise 4. Rear Admiral Yarnell commanded the carriers Lexington and Saratoga in an effort to demonstrate that Hawaii was vulnerable to naval air power. The expectation was that Yarnell would attack with battleships, but instead he left his battleships behind and proceeded only with his carriers to the north of Hawaii where it was less likely he would be detected. With a storm as cover, at dawn on Sunday, 7 February, Yarnell's 152 planes attacked the harbor from the northeast, just as the Japanese would ten years later. The army airfields were first put out of commission after which Battleship Row was attacked, with multiple hits on navy ships. No defending aircraft were able to launch. The Navy's war-game umpires declared the attack a total success, prompting Yarnell to strenuously warn of the Japanese threat.

The New York Times reported on the exercise, noting the defenders were unable to find the attacking fleet even after 24 hours had passed. U.S. intelligence knew Japanese writers had reported on the exercise. Ironically, in the U.S., the battleship admirals voted down a reassessment of naval tactics. The umpire's report did not even mention the stunning success of Yarnell's exercise. Instead they wrote, "It is doubtful if air attacks can be launched against Oahu in the face of strong defensive aviation without subjecting the attacking carriers to the danger of material damage and consequent great losses in the attack air force."

Yarnell's carrier tactics were reprised by Ernest King (at the time, Vice-Admiral) in Saratoga during wargames held in winter of 1938, with the same results, both in terms of surprising the defenders and in terms of the tactics being dismissed as "unfair".

== World War II ==
After three years' service commanding the Asiatic Fleet, Admiral Yarnell was transferred to the Retired List, and was elected an honorary member of the Rhode Island Society of the Sons of the Revolution on February 22, 1940.

On 1 November 1941, as war loomed, Yarnell was recalled to active duty and worked in the office of the Secretary of the Navy as Special Adviser to the Chinese Military Mission. While in this capacity, he testified before House Immigration Committee urging repeal of the Chinese Exclusion Acts.

Yarnell was relieved of active duty 15 January 1943, but returned in June as Head of a Special Section in the Office of Chief of Naval Operations until December 1944, when he again was relieved of active duty.

== Death ==
Admiral Harry E. Yarnell died on 7 July 1959 at Newport, Rhode Island, his home since his retirement. He is buried at Berkeley Memorial Cemetery in Middletown, Rhode Island together with his wife Emily Carroll Thomas Yarnell (1875–1965). They had one daughter, Ruth (1906–1948), who married late Vice admiral John Sylvester.They also had a son, Phillip, who married Vivian and settled down in the Baltimore area.

== Awards ==
Here is the ribbon bar of Admiral Harry E. Yarnell:

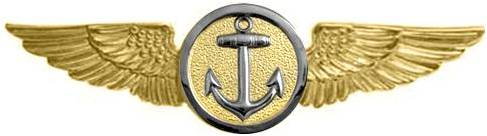

Badge	Naval Aviation Observer Badge		
1st Row	Navy Cross		Navy Distinguished Service Medal
2nd Row	Sampson Medal	Spanish Campaign Medal	Philippine Campaign Medal
3rd Row	China Campaign Medal	Mexican Service Medal	World War I Victory Medal w/ France clasp
4th Row	American Defense Service Medal	American Campaign Medal	Asiatic-Pacific Campaign Medal
5th Row	World War II Victory Medal	Commander of the Order of the British Empire	Chinese Order of the Cloud and Banner, 2nd Class

== Namesake ==
The USS Harry E. Yarnell (DLG-17) (later reclassified as (CG-17)) was named in his honor.

Military offices
Preceded by Orin G. Murfin	Commander-in-Chief, United States Asiatic Fleet; 30 October 1936 – 25 July 1939	Succeeded by Thomas C. Hart
