= Perry–Shockley House =

Historic house in Delaware, United States

- U.S. National Register of Historic Places
- Location within Delaware Location within the United States
- Location: 219 Washington St., Millsboro, Delaware
- Coordinates: 38°35′15″N 75°17′41″W
- Area: 1 acre (0.40 ha)
- Built: 1901
- Built by: Perry, John
- Architectural style: Queen Anne
- NRHP reference No.: 85002008
- Added to NRHP: September 5, 1985

Perry–Shockley House, also known as the Shockley House, was a historic home located at Millsboro, Sussex County, Delaware. It was built in 1901, and was a 2 1/2-story, "T"-plan, wood frame dwelling with a hipped roof in the Queen Anne style. It had a two-story, gable roofed rear wing and one-story wraparound porch.

It was added to the National Register of Historic Places in 1985.

The house was heavily damaged in a March 2014 fire and no longer exists.
