= USS Dale (DD-4) =

Bainbridge-class destroyer

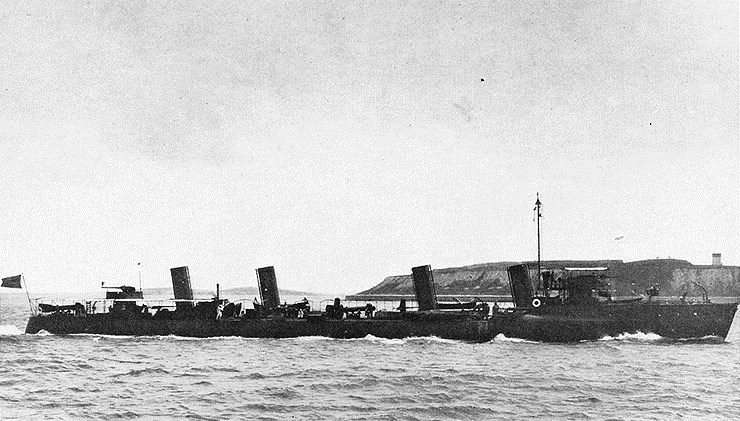
- USS Dale halftone reproduction of a photograph taken c. 1903-1916.

History

United States
- Name: Dale
- Namesake: Commodore Richard Dale
- Builder: William R. Trigg Company, Richmond, Virginia
- Laid down: 12 July 1899
- Launched: 24 July 1900
- Commissioned: 24 October 1902
- Decommissioned: 9 July 1919
- Fate: Sold for scrap, 3 January 1920

General characteristics
- Displacement: 420 long tons (430 t) (standard); 592 long tons (601 t) (full load)
- Length: 245 ft (74.7 m) (pp); 250 ft (76.2 m) (oa)
- Beam: 23 ft 7 in (7.2 m)
- Draft: 6 ft 6 in (2 m) (mean)
- Installed power: 4 × Thornycroft boilers; 8,000 ihp (6,000 kW)
- Propulsion: 2 × Vertical triple expansion engines; 2 × Propellers
- Speed: 29 kn (54 km/h; 33 mph) (designed speed)
- Complement: 3 officers; 72 enlisted men
- Armament: 2 × 3 in (76 mm)/50 caliber guns; 5 × 6-pounder (57 mm (2.2 in)) guns; 2 × 18 in (457 mm) torpedo tubes

The second USS Dale was a Bainbridge class destroyer in the United States Navy.

== Construction ==
Dale was launched on 24 July 1900 by William R. Trigg Company, Richmond, Virginia; sponsored by Miss M. H. Wilson; placed in reserve commission on 24 October 1902, Lieutenant Harry E. Yarnell in command; outfitted at Norfolk, Virginia; and commissioned in full on 13 February 1903.

== Pre-World War I ==
Assigned to the North Atlantic Fleet, Dale cruised with the First Torpedo Flotilla on the Atlantic coast, taking part in a fleet search problem conducted off Maine, and passing before President Theodore Roosevelt in review off Oyster Bay, New York, on 17 August 1903.

The First Torpedo Flotilla - convoyed by Buffalo - cleared Norfolk on 12 December 1903 and sailed to the Asiatic Station by way of the Mediterranean and the Suez Canal. Arriving at Cavite, Philippine Islands, on 14 April 1904, Dale cruised in the islands and on the coast of China until placed out of commission in reserve at Cavite on 5 December 1905. Recommissioned on 10 July 1907, she remained on duty with the Asiatic Fleet, cruising to Japan and China, engaging in torpedo and battle practice and maneuvers with the flotilla, guarding and inspecting the target range at Cavite, and transporting mail and passengers.

== World War I ==
After the United States entered World War I, Dale patrolled the entrance to Manila Bay from 30 June – 1 August 1917, then sailed to join US Patrol Squadrons based on Gibraltar, arriving there on 20 October. She patrolled and escorted convoys in the eastern Mediterranean until the end of the war. Clearing Gibraltar on 8 December 1918, Dale arrived at Charleston, South Carolina on 12 January 1919, was decommissioned at Philadelphia on 9 July 1919, and sold to Henry A. Hitner's Sons Company on 3 January 1920.

== Noteworthy commanding officers ==
- Lieutenant Harry E. Yarnell (24 October 1902 – 13 February 1903) (Later Admiral)
- Lieutenant Hutchinson I. Cone (13 February 1903 – 27 April 1904) (Later Rear Admiral)
- Lieutenant Harry E. Yarnell (27 April 1904 – 17 July 1905) (Later Admiral)
- Lieutenant Frank Jack Fletcher (4 April 1910 – 20 April 1912) (Later Admiral) - Fletcher-class destroyer named for him
