= George H. Burton =

Inspector General of the United States Army

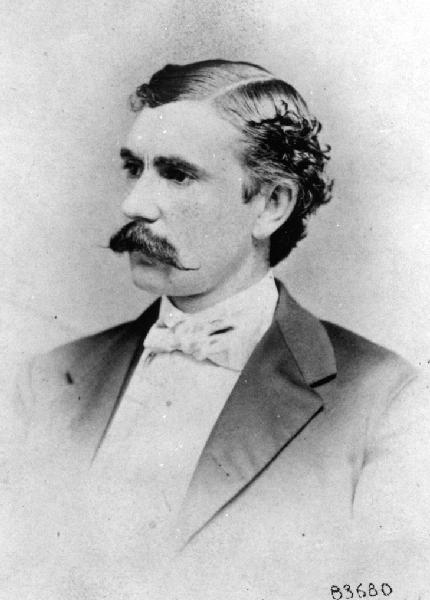
- Burton as adjutant of the 21st Infantry in 1870
- Born: January 15, 1843; Millsboro, Delaware, US
- Died: October 20, 1917 (aged 74); Los Angeles, California, US
- Burial place: Arlington National Cemetery
- Spouse: Minerva "Minnie" Larrabee (m. 1870–1913)
- Children: 3
- Relatives: Fitzhugh Lee III (grandson); Charles H. Larrabee (father-in-law)
- Military career
- Service: United States Army
- Service years: 1865–1906
- Rank: Brigadier General
- Unit: Department of the Army Inspector General
- Commands: Inspector General, Department of the Missouri; Inspector General, Department of Arizona; Inspector General, Division of the Pacific; Inspector General, Department of California; Inspector General, Pacific Inspection District; Inspector General, Department of the Lakes; Inspector General, Division of Cuba; Inspector General of the United States Army
- Wars: American Indian Wars: Modoc War; Nez Perce War; Spanish–American War

George H. Burton (15 January 1843 – 20 October 1917) was a career officer in the United States Army. A veteran of the American Indian Wars and Spanish–American War, he attained the rank of brigadier general as Inspector General of the United States Army.

A native of Millsboro, Delaware, Burton was raised and educated in Delaware and attended Delaware Military Academy. He then began attendance at the United States Military Academy (West Point), from which he graduated in 1865. Commissioned in the Infantry, he served in the former Confederacy during the Reconstruction era, followed by service in the west during the American Indian Wars.

In 1885, Burton transferred to the Department of the Army Inspector General, and he carried out inspector general appointments at departments and districts throughout the United States. During the Spanish–American War, he was inspector general of the army's Division of Cuba. Burton was promoted to brigadier general in 1903 and appointed as the army's inspector general. He held this position until retiring in 1906.

In retirement, Burton resided in Los Angeles. He died in Los Angeles on 20 October 1917. Burton was buried at Arlington National Cemetery.

== Early life ==
George Hall Burton was born in Millsboro, Delaware, on 15 January 1843, a son of Benjamin Burton and Catharine Roach (Green) Burton. He was raised and educated in Delaware and attended Delaware Military Academy. In 1861, he began attendance at the United States Military Academy. Burton graduated in 1865 ranked 34th of 68, and among his classmates who also became general officers were Charles W. Raymond, Alfred E. Bates, John Patten Story, and Samuel Meyers Mills Jr. Among his classmates who did not attain general officer rank was railroad executive Henry B. Ledyard Jr. At graduation, Burton was commissioned as a second lieutenant of Infantry. He was promoted to first lieutenant on the same day.

Burton was initially assigned to the 12th Infantry Regiment at Fort Hamilton, New York. In December 1865 he was assigned to post-Civil War Reconstruction duty in Richmond, Virginia. In March 1866, he was reassigned to Petersburg, Virginia. From May to June 1866, he served in Washington, D.C., after which he returned to Petersburg.

== Start of career ==
In September 1866, Burton was transferred to the 21st Infantry Regiment and in December he was assigned as the regimental adjutant. He served in this position until June 1868, and from January 1867 to June 1868 he also served as acting assistant adjutant of the Military District of Petersburg. From June 1868 to April 1869, Burton was aide-de-camp to Major General George Stoneman, the commander of the First Military District, which was headquartered in Richmond. From April 1869 to August 1871, he served again as adjutant of the 21st Infantry, which was stationed successively at Fort Omaha, Nebraska, the Presidio of San Francisco, and Drum Barracks, California. Burton was promoted to captain in August 1871.

From January to June 1872, Burton performed frontier duty at the Colorado River Indian Reservation and at Camp Colorado, Arizona. From June to August 1872, he was posted to Fort Whipple, Arizona. Burton served at Fort Vancouver, Washington, from September 1872 to October 1874, and he took part in the Modoc War between January and April 1873. Burton was posted to Ft. Townsend, Washington, from October 1874 to June 1878, and he took part in the 1877 Nez Perce War. (Note: In February 1890, Burton received brevet promotion to major in recognition of his Indian Wars service between 1873 and 1877.) From December 1878 to September 1880, Burton served with his regiment at Columbus Barracks, Ohio. He was then posted to Fort Klamath, Oregon, where he served until June 1884, which included temporary duty inspecting army horses in Oakland, California, from February to May 1883. Burton served at Fort Sidney, Nebraska, from June 1884 to February 1885.

== Continued career ==
In March 1885, Burton was promoted to major in the Department of the Army Inspector General, and he performed inspector general duties for the rest of his career. After becoming a major, he served in the office of the Inspector General of the United States Army until June 1885. From June 1885 to July 1888, he served as inspector general of the Department of the Missouri. He was then assigned as inspector general of the Department of Arizona, where he served until November 1888. He was promoted to lieutenant colonel in August 1888.

Burton served as inspector general of the Division of the Pacific from November 1888 to July 1891. He was inspector general of the Department of California from July 1891 to September 1893. He served in the office of the U.S. Army Inspector General from September 1893 to May 1895, and in January 1895 he was promoted to colonel. Burton was assigned as inspector general of the Pacific Inspection District from May 1895 to May 1898. From May to June 1898, he served as inspector general of the Department of the Lakes.

== Later career ==
From June 1898 to September 1899, Burton performed Spanish–American War duty in the office of the U.S. Army inspector general. From September 1899 to May 1902, he served as inspector general of the Division of Cuba. He served as inspector general of the Department of the East from May 1902 to April 1903. On 12 April 1903, Burton was promoted to brigadier general and assigned as Inspector General of the United States Army. He served until retiring for disability in September 1906, four months before reaching the mandatory retirement age of 64.

In retirement, Burton was a resident of Los Angeles. He died in Los Angeles on 20 October 1917. Burton was buried at Arlington National Cemetery.

== Family ==
In November 1870, Burton married Minerva "Minnie" Larrabee, the daughter of Charles H. Larrabee. They were the parents of three daughters, as well as a son, Charles L., who died in infancy.

- Minerva "Minnie" Burton, the wife of army officer Thomas Pearce.
- Leila, the wife of army officer Rush Wells. She was later married to John Howard Hutty, the brother of artist Alfred Hutty.
- Kathro Larrabee Burton, the wife of army officer George Mason Lee. Their children included United States Navy officer Fitzhugh Lee III, who retired as a vice admiral.

== Dates of rank ==
Burton's dates of rank were:

- Second Lieutenant, 23 June 1865
- First Lieutenant, 23 June 1865
- Captain, 16 August 1871
- Major, 27 March 1885
- Lieutenant Colonel, 31 August 1888
- Colonel, 2 January 1895
- Brigadier General, 12 April 1903
- Brigadier General (retired), 30 September 1906
