= Hutchinson I. Cone =

American Navy admiral (1871–1941)

Hutch I. Cone
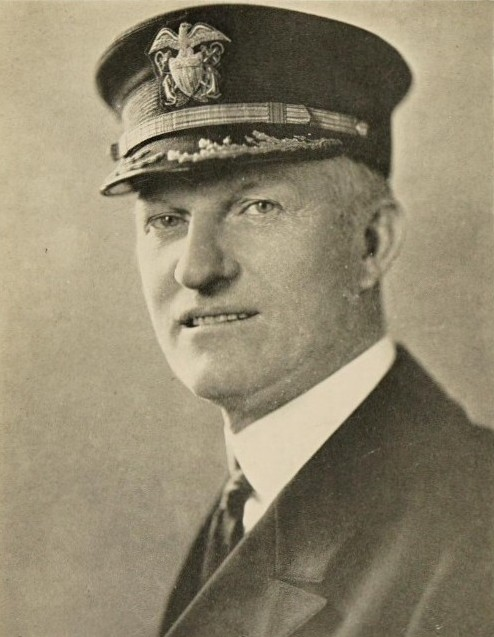
- Nicknames: Hutch, Reddy
- Born: Hutchinson Ingham Cone; 26 April 1871; Brooklyn, New York, U.S.
- Died: 12 February 1941 (aged 69) Orlando, Florida, U.S.
- Allegiance: United States of America
- Branch: United States Navy
- Service years: 1894–1922
- Rank: Rear Admiral
- Commands: USS Huron; U.S. Naval Aviation Forces, Foreign Service; USS Dixie (Interim); Bureau of Steam Engineering; Torpedo Boat Flotilla, Great White Fleet; USS Whipple; USS Dale
- Conflicts: Spanish–American War; World War I
- Awards: Navy Distinguished Service Medal

Hutchinson Ingham "Hutch" Cone (26 April 1871 – 12 February 1941) was a United States Navy officer. Though only a lieutenant commander, he served as head of the Bureau of Steam Engineering with the temporary rank of rear admiral from May 1909 to May 1913. During World War I, Cone served as commander of U.S. Naval Aviation Forces in Europe.

== Early life and education ==
Cone was born in Brooklyn, but his family soon moved to Benton in Columbia County, Florida. He graduated from Florida Agricultural College in Lake City in 1889. Cone was appointed to the United States Naval Academy from Florida on 5 September 1890 and graduated on 8 June 1894. He later attended the Naval War College from 1919 to 1920.

== Military career ==
After graduation from the Naval Academy, Cone served as an engineering cadet aboard the armored cruiser Maine. Promoted to assistant engineer in July 1896, he then served aboard the protected cruiser Philadelphia. During the Spanish–American War, Cone served aboard the protected cruiser Baltimore during the Battle of Manila Bay. In July 1899, he was promoted to lieutenant junior grade and served on the battleship Texas. In February 1902, Cone was promoted to lieutenant and, after serving on the training ship Prairie, was given command of the destroyer Dale from February 1903 to April 1904. In 1903, he sailed Dale from Hampton Roads, Virginia to Manila in the Philippines.

Cone commanded the destroyer Whipple from 1907 to 1908. His ship was part of the torpedo boat flotilla in the Great White Fleet. Promoted to lieutenant commander in January 1908, he was given command of the entire torpedo boat flotilla during the voyage around Cape Horn to San Francisco. Cone then served as fleet engineer for the remainder of the journey back to Hampton Roads, Virginia.

Upon his return to the United States, Cone was appointed head of the Bureau of Steam Engineering after the sudden retirement of Rear Adm. John K. Barton. He became a temporary rear admiral on 18 May 1909. During his tenure, Cone developed a system of wireless shore stations linking the United States, Panama and U.S. possessions in the Pacific. Cone was also an early advocate of investigating the naval application of airplanes. In October 1910, he proposed purchasing an airplane for the new scout cruiser Chester but was unsuccessful in obtaining funding. Purchase of the first three naval airplanes was eventually authorized in 1911. Cone was replaced as head of the Bureau of Steam Engineering on 18 May 1913 by Rear Adm. Robert S. Griffin.

After relinquishing the rank of rear admiral, Cone briefly served as commanding officer of the destroyer tender Dixie. Promoted to commander in July 1913, he then served as executive officer of the battleship Utah. His ship participated in the 1914 occupation of Veracruz, Mexico. Cone next became marine superintendent of the Panama Canal in 1915. With the United States entry into World War I, he received a temporary promotion to captain in October 1917.

The U.S. Navy sent Lt. Cmdr. Kenneth Whiting to France to help set up seaplane bases to aid in the battle against German submarines. Vice Adm. William S. Sims, the overall naval expeditionary force commander, was impressed by Whiting's efforts in France but felt that he needed a more experienced officer to help coordinate efforts with all of the allies. Cone was chosen to be overall commander of U.S. Naval Aviation Forces in Europe, and upon arriving in Ireland selected four sites for bases there. He next went to England where he selected an additional base site plus an assembly and maintenance site. Only then did he proceed to France to assume overall command from Whiting. Training resources were limited in France because of the pressing need for Army pilots at the front, so arrangements were made with Italy for two additional operating bases and a training site.

Cone served as naval aviation commander until October 1918, traveling from his headquarters in France to the various bases and meetings with allies. As a result, he was a passenger on RMS Leinster when she was torpedoed by a German submarine on 10 October. Rescued from the water with fractured legs, his participation in the war effort was over. Cone was subsequently awarded the Distinguished Service Medal by the U.S. Navy and the Distinguished Service Order by the United Kingdom. He was made an honorary commander of the Order of the British Empire and an officer of the French Legion of Honour and the Italian Order of Saints Maurice and Lazarus.

Cone's promotion to captain was made permanent in July 1919. After attending the Naval War College, he served as commander of the armored cruiser Huron from June 1920 to February 1922. Suffering from the lingering effects of his wartime injuries, Cone retired from active duty as a rear admiral on 11 July 1922.

== Later life ==
After retirement, Cone became an executive for the Panama Steamship Company. On 4 February 1924, he was appointed vice president of the Emergency Fleet Corporation. In November, Cone became general manager of the corporation. On 7 October 1925, he resigned as vice president and general manager because of a disagreement with the United States Shipping Board.

In 1926, Cone became a member of the board of directors of the Daniel Guggenheim Fund for the Promotion of Aeronautics. In 1928, he was appointed to the United States Shipping Board by President Calvin Coolidge to replace Adm. William S. Benson. Serving until 1935, Cone was an advocate of diesel cargo ships and warned about the potential military applications of the growing fleet of fast Japanese cargo ships. In March 1937, he became chairman of the board of the Moore & McCormack Steamship Lines.

== Personal ==
Cone was the son of Daniel Newnan Cone II and Annette (Ingham) Cone. His grandfather Daniel Newnan Cone I was employed as an officer of the law in Benton, Florida and killed in the line of duty several months before Cone's father was born in 1842. As a young man, Cone's father served in Company C, 2nd Florida Infantry and then Company K, 2nd Florida Cavalry during the American Civil War. In 1885, his father was elected to one term in the Florida House of Representatives. His younger brother Daniel Newnan Cone III became a physician and later served two terms in the Florida Senate in the 1920s.

On 16 October 1900, Cone married Martha Bland "Patty" Selden (5 August 1872 – 28 April 1922). They had a daughter and a son. After his wife's death, Cone married Julia Rebecca Mattis on 17 December 1930. He died as the result of a heart ailment in Orlando, Florida on 12 February 1941. Cone, his first wife and both of their children are buried at Arlington National Cemetery.

Cone was the grandfather of disability rights activist Kitty Cone.

== Legacy ==
The U.S. Navy destroyer USS Cone was named in his honor. His second wife served as the destroyer's sponsor.
