= Fitzhugh Lee III =

Vice admiral in the United States Navy

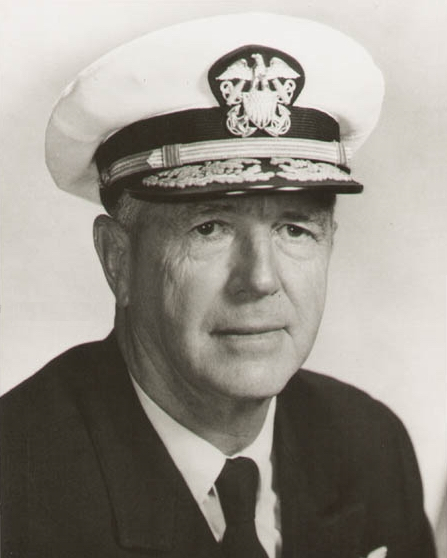
- Born: Fitzhugh Burton Lee; August 18, 1905; Batangas, Philippine Islands
- Died: January 20, 1992 (aged 86)
- Allegiance: United States
- Branch: United States Navy
- Service years: 1926–1967
- Rank: Vice Admiral
- Commands: USS Manila Bay (CVE-61)
- Conflicts: World War II; Korean War
- Awards: Navy Cross (2); Navy Dist. Service Medal (2); Legion of Merit
- Spouse: Harriet Frances Davis

Fitzhugh Lee III (August 19, 1905 – January 20, 1992) was a vice admiral in the United States Navy. A 1926 graduate of the United States Naval Academy. His classmates included Henry C. Bruton, Charles Carpenter, Howard Gilmore, Lofton Henderson, Carlton Hutchins, Max Leslie, Wade McClusky, Robert B. Pirie, and John Sylvester. He saw combat during World War II, earning the Navy Cross twice while serving as captain of the USS Manila Bay (CVE-61). He was a member of the Lee family.

== Early life and education ==
Lee was born on August 19, 1905, to George Mason Lee (1877–1934), a U.S. Army Cavalry officer stationed in the Philippines, and his wife, Kathro Larrabee Burton (1878–1943). Through his father, he was a grandson of former Virginia governor Fitzhugh Lee, great-grandson of Admiral Sydney Smith Lee, and great-great-grandson of "Light Horse Harry" Lee. Through his mother, he was a grandson of George H. Burton. He was a member of the United States Naval Academy's class of 1926.

== Military career ==
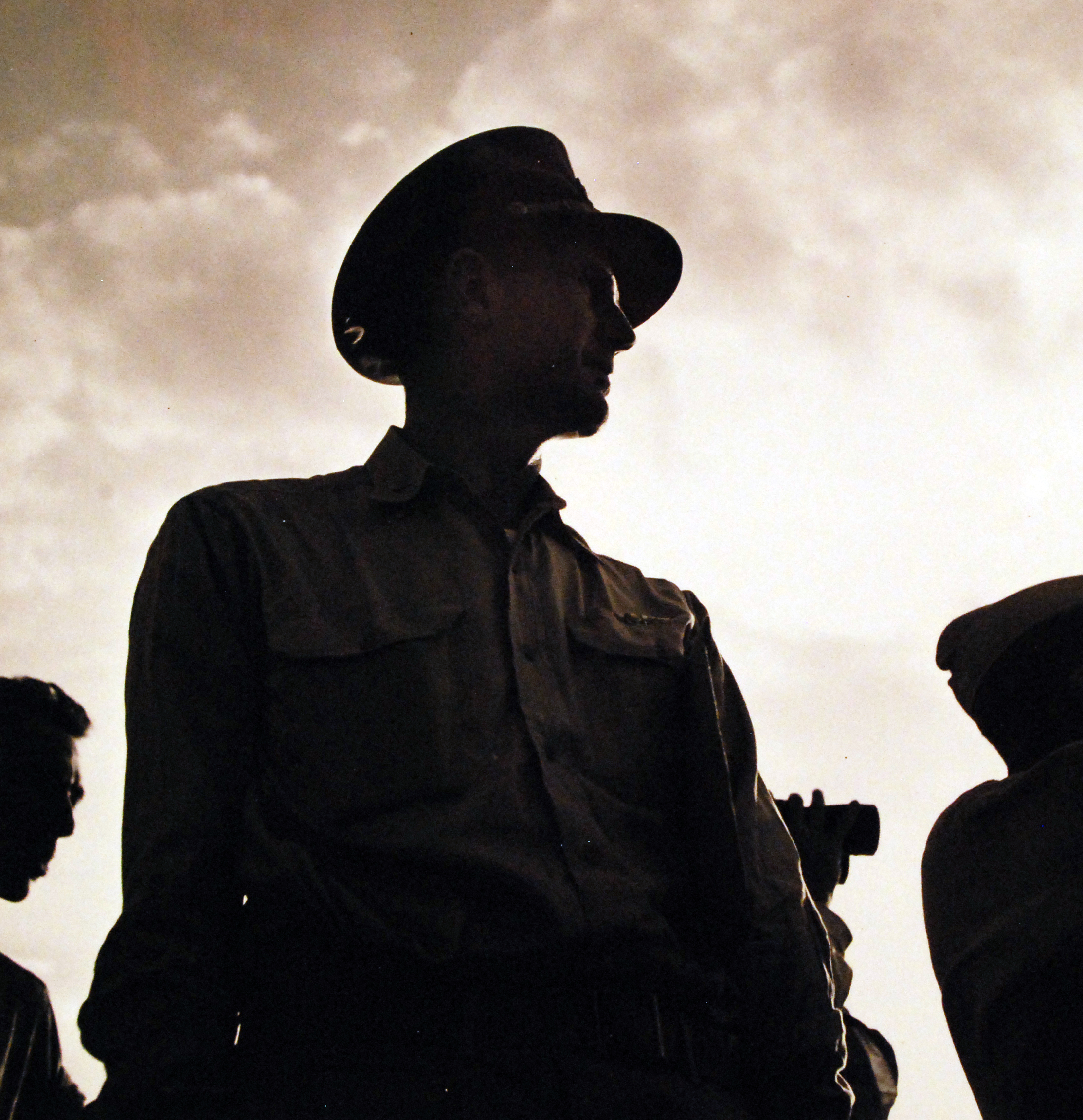
Lee in Japan in September 1945

After graduating from the academy, Lee served as a pilot, seeing service on the USS Enterprise (CV-6) before the outbreak of World War II. During the war, he was promoted to captain and was given command of the USS Manila Bay (CVE-61), which he saw through the Battle of Leyte Gulf and Battle off Samar. He was present at the signing of the Japanese Instrument of Surrender on September 2, 1945. During the administration of Harry S. Truman, Lee served as an aide to Navy Secretary John L. Sullivan. He retired in 1967, shortly after being presented with the Gray Eagle Award.

== Later life and death ==
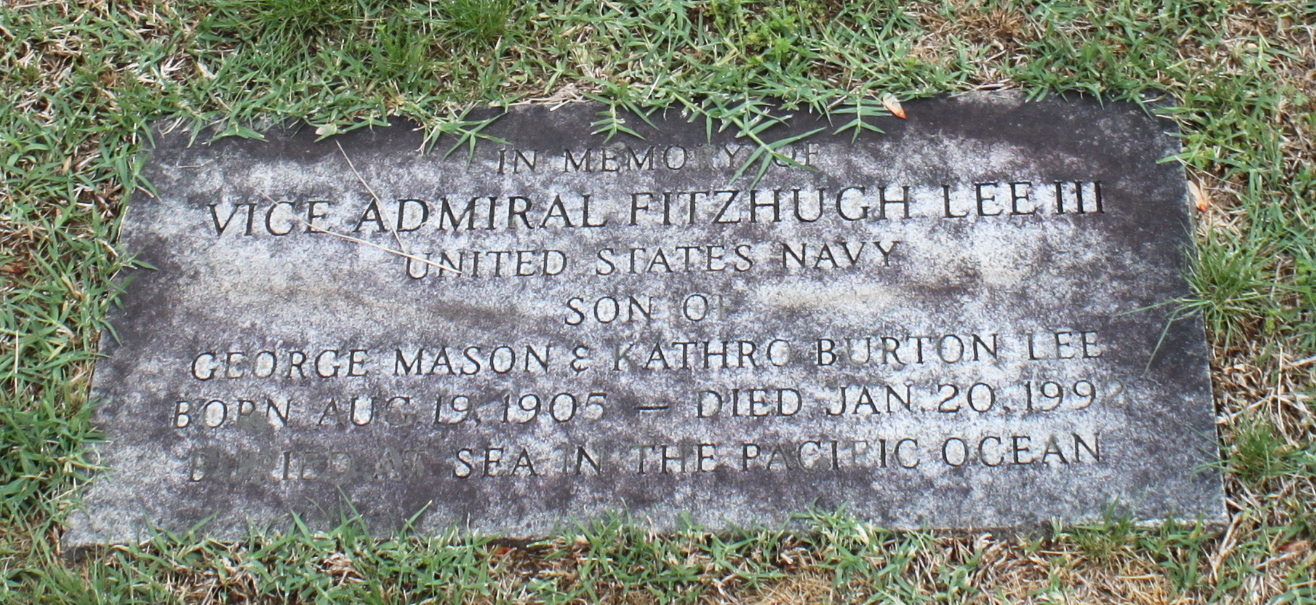
Memorial to Fitzhugh Lee III at Hollywood Cemetery

Lee died in 1992 and was buried at sea in the Pacific Ocean, though a memorial exists in the family plot in Richmond, Virginia's Hollywood Cemetery beside his parents and grandparents.
