= Carlton B. Hutchins =

United States Navy Medal of Honor recipient

Carlton Barmore Hutchins
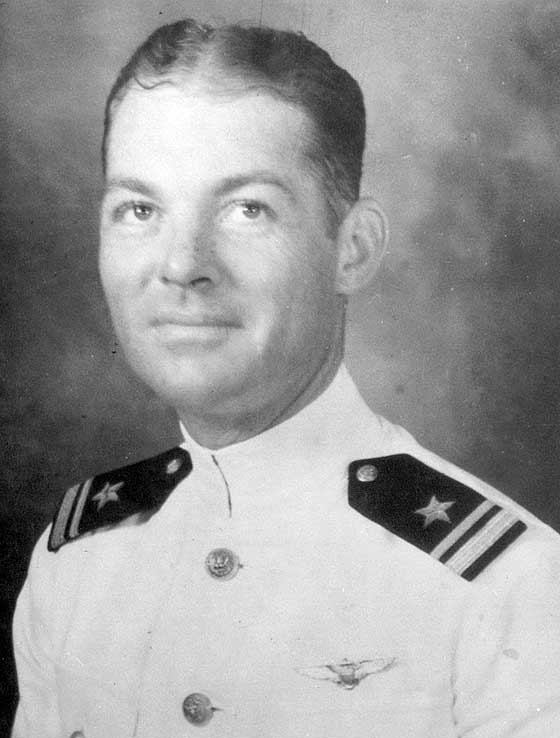
- Hutchins as a lieutenant (junior grade) (1934)
- Born: September 12, 1904; Albany, New York, U.S.
- Died: February 2, 1938 (aged 33); California, U.S.
- Military career
- Allegiance: United States of America
- Branch: United States Navy
- Service years: 1926-1938
- Rank: Lieutenant
- Awards: Medal of Honor

Carlton Barmore Hutchins (September 12, 1904 – February 2, 1938) was a U.S. Naval aviator who lost his life in a mid-air collision in 1938. Mortally injured, he was able to remain at the controls and allow his surviving crew to parachute to safety. He was posthumously awarded the Medal of Honor.

== Biography ==
Hutchins was born in Albany, New York, September 12, 1904, and graduated from the United States Naval Academy in 1926, the same class as Henry C. Bruton, Charles L. Carpenter, Howard Gilmore, Lofton Henderson, Fitzhugh Lee, Max Leslie, Wade McClusky, Robert B. Pirie, and John Sylvester. After serving on battleship Pennsylvania until 1928, he underwent flight training at the Naval Aeronautical Station in Pensacola, Florida and was designated a naval aviator in February 1929. During the early 1930s Hutchins flew fighters from Saratoga, scout planes from Concord, and studied aeronautical engineering at the California Institute of Technology.

In 1937, he served with a seaplane squadron in the Caribbean and in November was transferred to Patrol Squadron 11 based on the tender USS Langley (AV-3). During fleet exercises, on February 2, 1938, off the coast of southern California, Lieutenant Hutchins' seaplane collided in mid-air with another PBY. Lieutenant Hutchins lost his life in the crash and received the Medal of Honor posthumously.

== Namesake ==
In 1942, the destroyer USS Hutchins (DD-476) was named in his honor.

== Medal of Honor citation ==
His citation for the Medal of Honor reads:

Although his plane was badly damaged, Lieutenant Hutchins remained at the controls endeavoring to bring the damaged plane to a safe landing and to afford an opportunity for his crew to escape by parachutes. His cool, calculated conduct contributed principally to the saving of the lives of all who survived. His conduct on this occasion was above and beyond the call of duty.

== See also ==
- List of Medal of Honor recipients
- List of Medal of Honor recipients in non-combat incidents
