= USS Cone =

Gearing-class destroyer

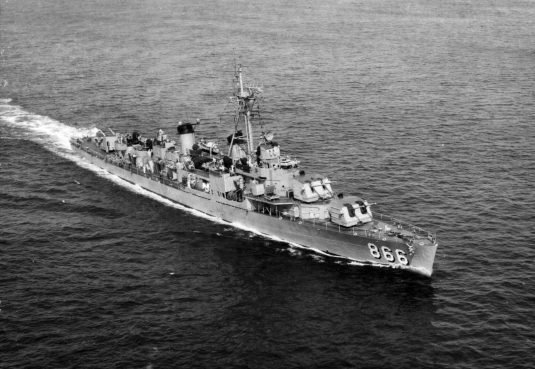
- USS Cone, 1959

History

United States
- Name: Cone
- Namesake: Rear Admiral Hutchinson Ingham Cone
- Builder: Bethlehem Steel Corporation, Staten Island
- Laid down: 30 November 1944
- Launched: 10 May 1945
- Acquired: 18 August 1945
- Commissioned: 18 August 1945
- Stricken: 1 October 1982
- Identification: Callsign: NBGG; Hull number: DD-866
- Fate: Disposed of through the Security Assistance Program (SAP) to Pakistan

Pakistan
- Name: Alamgir
- Namesake: Alamgir
- Acquired: 1 October 1982
- Decommissioned: 4 December 1998
- Fate: Scrapped

General characteristics
- Class & type: Gearing-class destroyer
- Displacement: 2,425
- Length: 390 ft 6 in (119.02 m)
- Beam: 41 ft 1 in (12.52 m)
- Draft: 18 ft 6 in (5.64 m)
- Speed: 35 knots (65 km/h; 40 mph)
- Complement: 367
- Armament: 4 × 5 in (127 mm)/38 cal. guns; 5 × 21 in (533 mm) torpedo tubes

USS Cone (DD-866) was a Gearing-class destroyer of the United States Navy, named for Rear Admiral "Hutch" Cone USN (1871–1941). She was laid down by the Bethlehem Steel Corporation at Staten Island, New York, on 30 November 1944, launched on 10 May 1945 by Mrs. H. I. Cone, and commissioned on 18 August 1945.

Cone alternated operations along the east coast and in the Caribbean with the 2nd Fleet. She deployed with the 6th Fleet to the Mediterranean, participated in Sea Dragon and Market Time operations, patrolled on search and rescue duties, and carried out Naval Gunfire Support missions during the Vietnam War.

== History ==
Cone's first cruise was to Portsmouth, England, between 12 February and 9 April 1946. After a week at Newport, Rhode Island, she sailed on an extensive goodwill tour to ports in northern and southern Europe, welcoming visitors at each city. Cone returned to Newport on 24 October 1946. She operated along the east coast and in the Caribbean from her homeport of Norfolk, Virginia, until the summer of 1947; then carried midshipmen on a training cruise to northern Europe.

Continuing training and service activities along the east coast and in the Caribbean, when not deployed, Cone served her first tour of duty with the 6th Fleet in the Mediterranean in 1948, joining the United Nations Palestine Patrol. She returned to the Mediterranean in 1949, and later that year crossed the Arctic Circle on maneuvers. East coast and Caribbean operations and another 6th Fleet tour occupied Cone in 1950. Her 1951 Mediterranean cruise was highlighted with a visit by Winston Churchill at Venice on 9 September, and. by Cone's transportation of the United States and British Ambassadors to Greece on a diplomatic call on the monasteries of Mount Athos. She served again in the Mediterranean in 1952, and on 28 August 1953, cleared Newport for a cruise around the world, sailing by way of Panama, San Diego, Pearl Harbor, Midway, and Yokosuka to join TF 77 on patrol off Korea, and continuing home with calls at Hong Kong, Bahrein, Port Said, Naples, Villefranche, and Lisbon, returning to Norfolk 9 April 1954.

From September to November 1954, Cone sailed to join other NATO navies in antisubmarine training off Ireland and in Operation "Blackjack," then called briefly at Mediterranean ports. Nineteen fifty-five found her concentrating on air defense exercises and acting as planeguard for carriers. In 1956, she joined in NATO exercises in the Mediterranean, returning home in June. Alerted during the Suez Crisis, she joined a task force which sailed to the eastern Atlantic to stand by, then called at Lisbon and returned home when its services were not needed. In 1958 and 1959-60 Cone served with the Sixth Fleet in the Mediterranean; through the remainder of the 1960s, she conducted exercises in the Caribbean, operated locally from her new home port, Charleston, S.C., and visited northern European waters during NATO maneuvers.

== Decommissioning and transfer ==
Cone was decommissioned and stricken from the Naval Vessel Register on 1 October 1982, transferred to Pakistan and renamed Alamgir. She was commissioned at Charleston on 1 October 1982. She was decommissioned on 4 December 1998 and scrapped.
