= USS Hutchins =

Fletcher-class destroyer

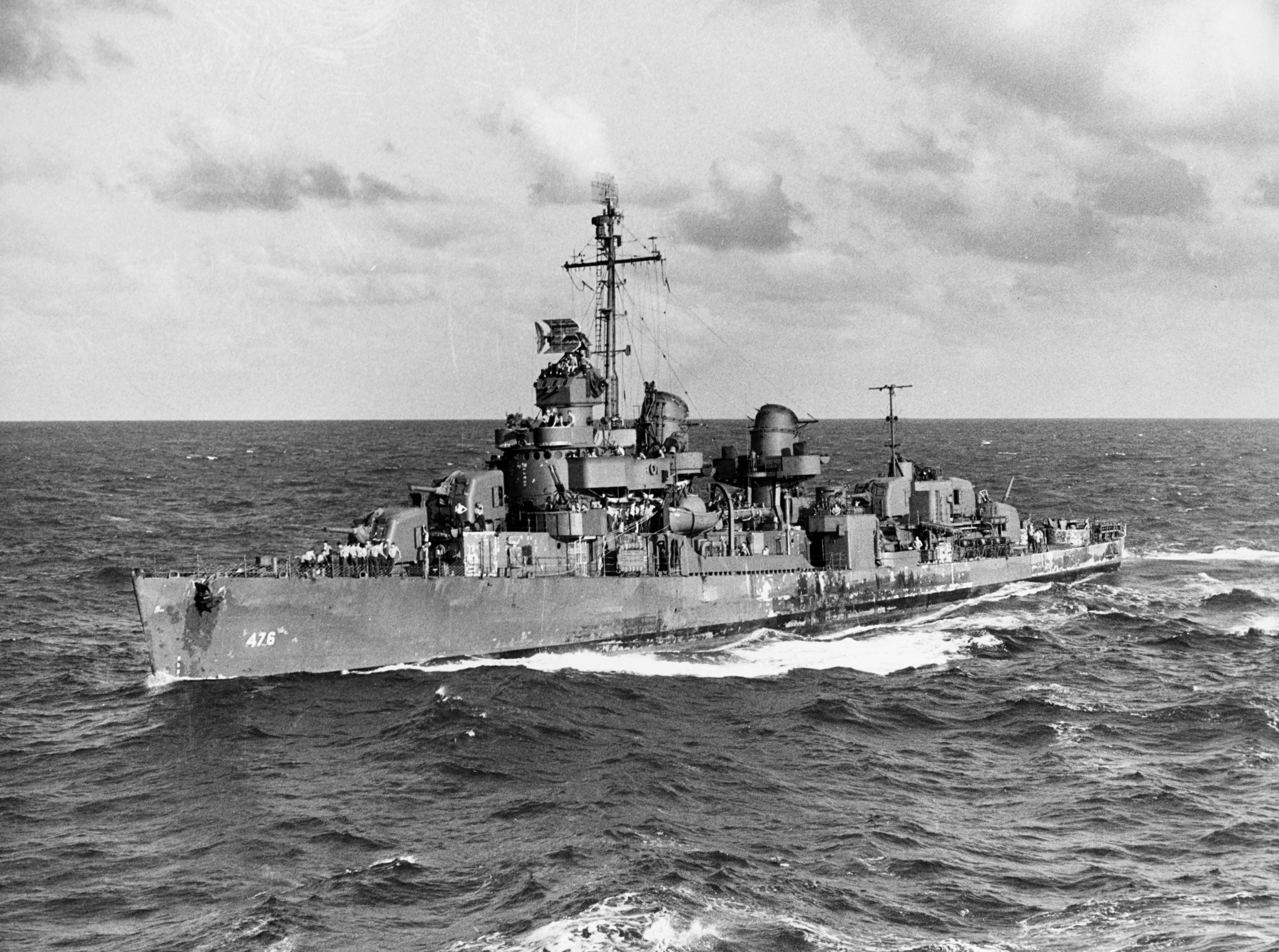
- USS Hutchins (DD-476)

History

United States
- Namesake: Carleton B. Hutchins
- Builder: Boston Navy Yard
- Laid down: 27 September 1941
- Launched: 20 February 1942
- Commissioned: 17 November 1942
- Decommissioned: 30 November 1945
- Stricken: 19 December 1945
- Fate: Sold for scrap, January 1948

General characteristics
- Class & type: Fletcher-class destroyer
- Displacement: 2,050 tons
- Length: 376 ft 6 in (114.7 m)
- Beam: 39 ft 8 in (12.1 m)
- Draft: 17 ft 9 in (5.4 m)
- Propulsion: 60,000 shp (45 MW); 2 propellers
- Speed: 35 knots (65 km/h; 40 mph)
- Range: 6500 nmi. (12,000 km) at 15 kt
- Complement: 336
- Armament: 5 × single Mk 12 5 in (127 mm)/38 guns; 5 × twin 40 mm (1.6 in) Bofors AA guns; 7 × single 20 mm (0.8 in) Oerlikon AA guns; 2 × quintuple 21 in (533 mm) torpedo tubes; 6 × single depth charge throwers; 2 × depth charge racks

USS Hutchins (DD-476), was a Fletcher-class destroyer, of the United States Navy named after Naval aviator Lieutenant Carlton B. Hutchins (1904–1938), who though mortally injured, was able to remain at the controls of his aircraft and allow his surviving crew to parachute to safety and was posthumously awarded the Medal of Honor.

Built by Boston Navy Yard, Boston, Massachusetts Hutchins entered service in 1942 and was assigned to the Pacific fleet in March 1943. Hutchins took part in campaigns in the Aleutian Islands, amphibious landings at Cape Gloucester, the Wakde-Sarmi operation and Iwo Jima. On 25 April 1945, the destroyer was attacked by a suicide boat and severely damaged. Still under repair at the end of the war, she was decommissioned in 1945 and sold for scrap in 1948.

== Construction and commissioning ==
Hutchins (DD-476) was launched 20 February 1942, sponsored by Mrs C.B. Hutchins, widow of Lt. Hutchins, commissioned 17 November 1942. She was planned to be one of six Fletcher-class destroyers built with a catapult for a floatplane but the plan was abandoned.

== Service history ==
=== 1943 ===
After completing shakedown cruise in Casco Bay, Maine, Hutchins got underway from Boston 17 March 1943 and escorted two tankers to Galveston, Texas. From there she proceeded through the Panama Canal to San Diego, arriving 11 April. Following an escort voyage to New Caledonia and Espiritu Santo, Hutchins arrived at Pearl Harbor on 30 May for the addition of two twin 40mm gun mounts amidships.

On 25 June, while testing her guns in Hawaiian waters, an electrical failure caused a gun to fire into Hutchins' stack, killing nine and wounding twenty. While being repaired at Pearl Harbor, the ship was fitted with the latest Combat Information Center (CIC) equipment.

The ship returned to San Diego on 11 July 1943 for training and got underway with a landing ship tank (LST) group seven days later for the voyage to Adak Island in the Aleutians. She took part in the occupation of Kiska 15 August after the Japanese left the island and in the following months, patrolled and engaged in fleet training maneuvers.

Hutchins departed the northern Pacific on 18 November 1943 for Milne Bay, New Guinea and screened LSTs during the landings at Cape Gloucester. Designed to secure the important straits between New Britain and New Guinea, the landings began on 26 December. Hutchins and the other screening vessels came under heavy air attack in the days that followed, with Hutchins claiming one aircraft shot down and assisting with another. After escorting a support convoy to Cape Gloucester from Buna on mainland New Guinea, the destroyer steamed with another LST group to Saidor, farther up the coast of New Guinea. During a rain squall, she collided with another destroyer in the congested assault area and was forced to steam to Cairns, Australia 16 January 1944 for repairs to her bow.

=== 1944 ===
Hutchins departed Cairns 22 February and, after night tactical drills, sailed 28 February with Admiral Daniel E. Barbey's amphibious group for the Admiralties. Arriving the next day, the ship carried out shore bombardment of Manus, a base which was to become vital in the coming campaigns, and with Rear Admiral Victor Crutchley, RN, in the heavy cruiser HMAS Shropshire, established a patrol off Manus. During late March and April, Hutchins and other destroyers shelled Wewak and Hansa Bay, as a diversion for the planned assault at Hollandia.

Steaming from Cape Sudest 18 April, Hutchins arrived Hollandia 22 April and with other fleet units gave gunfire support to the initial assault, then retired to screen escort carriers. She steamed south of Truk on 10 May to pick up survivors of a B-24 raid on the Japanese stronghold, returning for the next step in the New Guinea campaign.

Hutchins next took part in the Wakde-Sarmi operation on 17 May. After shore bombardment and screening operations, she moved on to Biak ten days later. Early in June, she operated with Task Forces 74 off Biak. On the night of 8 June, the ships detected a Japanese force approaching from the northwest. The Japanese destroyers cast off their troop barges with Hutchins and the rest of Crutchley's force in pursuit, exchanging fire at long range. The Allied ships broke off the chase just before 02:30 and returned to the assault area.

In July Hutchins provided gunfire support to the Noemfoor landings and operated with PT boats in the Aitape area 15–25 July harassing Japanese communications. She also took part in the 30 July landings at Sansapor, completing a series of amphibious hops along the northern coast of New Guinea.

August 1944 was spent at Sydney and on fleet exercises off New Guinea. After a drydock period, Hutchins sailed from Humboldt Bay on 12 September to take part in the Morotai landings, a stepping-stone to the Philippines. She bombarded airstrips on 16 September and returned to Seeadler Harbor on 29 September to prepare for the invasion of the Philippines. The invasion fleet arrived at Leyte Gulf on 20 October, Hutchins was part of the pre-invasion bombardment, and screed the fleet, after the initial assault.

As the Japanese fleet moved toward the Philippines in a large three-pronged attempt to stop the invasion, Hutchins joined Admiral Jesse Oldendorf's surface forces waiting in Surigao Strait for Admiral Shoji Nishimura's Southern Force. In this phase of the larger Battle for Leyte Gulf referred to as the Battle of Surigao Strait, Hutchins, flagship of Captain K.M. McManes' Destroyer Squadron 24 (DesRon 24), was stationed on the right flank of the force Oldendorf had assembled. As Nishimura steamed up the strait early 25 October his ships were harassed by PT boats and then attacked by destroyers. Hutchins' group steamed south, launched torpedoes at about 03:30 and turned to close the range. As the large Japanese ships began to slow and scatter, the destroyers fired a second spread of torpedoes. The Michishio was struck by a torpedo fired by USS McDermut and then finished off by gunfire from Hutchins at position 10°25′N 125°23′E. After exchanging gunfire with the Japanese heavy ships, McManes brought the squadron out of range so that the bigger guns of the waiting fleet could engage.

After the actions of Leyte Gulf, Hutchins returned to screening. She ran onto an uncharted hulk on 26 October and after helping to repel air attacks until 29 October, sailed for San Francisco via Pearl Harbor, arriving on 25 November 1944 for repairs.

=== 1945 ===
Training exercises were carried out until 3 February, when she steamed toward Saipan to join a carrier force for the Iwo Jima operation. Her carrier group arrived three days before the landings to shell Japanese positions and support the operation during February and March 1945. After the island was captured, Hutchins returned to Ulithi before sailing on 27 March for the operation to capture Okinawa, the last step on the island-hopping campaign towards Japan. She screened a transport group during the first four days of April, helped repel air attacks before being assigned to gunfire support on 4 April. Hutchins spent the following daytime hours close to the beaches and her nights, screening the fleet. She claimed several aircraft shot down during a large air attack on 6 April and assisted the damaged destroyer Newcomb.

=== Fate ===
While on close support operations on 27 April, Hutchins was attacked by a Japanese Shin'yō-class suicide motorboat that had slipped through the formation and dropped an explosive charge close to her hull. Hutchins was shaken violently by the explosion and was severely damaged but no casualties were suffered and flooding was brought under control. The ship retired to Kerama Retto for temporary repairs, then steamed to Portland, Oregon, 15 July 1945.

Still undergoing repairs at the end of the war Hutchins was towed to Puget Sound 20 September 1945, decommissioned at Bremerton, Washington 30 November 1945, and sold for scrap in January 1948 to Learner & Co., Oakland, California.

== Honors ==
Hutchins received six battle stars for World War II service.

== See also ==
- USS Johnnie Hutchins (DE-360)
