= John Sylvester (admiral) =

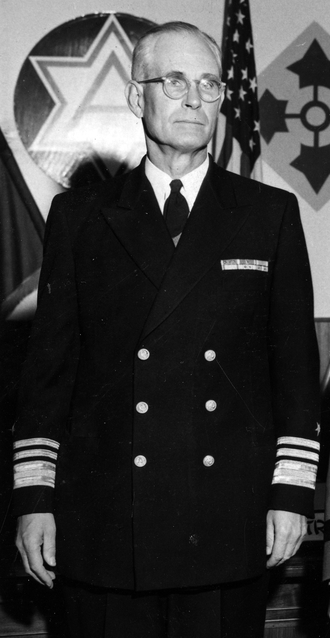
- Born: July 7, 1904; Wellston, Ohio
- Died: July 26, 1990 (aged 86); Washington, D.C.
- Military career
- Allegiance: United States
- Branch: United States Navy
- Service years: 1926–1965
- Rank: Vice Admiral
- Commands: USS Missouri (BB-63)
- Conflicts: World War II; Korean War
- Awards: Navy Distinguished Service Medal; Legion of Merit (3)

John Sylvester (July 7, 1904 – July 26, 1990) was an officer in the United States Navy who served from the 1930s to the 1960s and rose to the rank of vice admiral.

== Background ==
Sylvester grew up in Wellston, Ohio, the grandson of the city's first physician and son of the editor of the Wellston Telegram. He had a brother, George R., and a sister, Janet (later Mrs. Hiram Callahan). Sylvester attended the United States Naval Academy, and graduated among the top of his class in 1926. His classmates included Henry C. Bruton, Charles Carpenter, Howard Gilmore, Lofton Henderson, Carlton Hutchins, Fitzhugh Lee, Max Leslie, Robert Pirie, and Wade McClusky.

== Naval career ==
Joining the fleet in 1926, Sylvester served in 1937 as flag lieutenant to Admiral Harry E. Yarnell, commander of the United States Asiatic Fleet, and married Yarnell's daughter Ruth. Much of his career was spent in the Pacific or East Asia, including postings to Shanghai, Tsingtao, Hong Kong and the Philippines. He served as commanding officer of the USS Missouri (BB-63) from 18 October 1951 to 4 September 1952 while the battleship was serving as flagship to Rear Admiral James L. Holloway, Jr., the commander of the cruiser force, United States Fleet Forces Command between deployments to the Korean War. Promoted to rear admiral in 1953, he was made special assistant to the chief of the Armed Forces Special Weapons Project in California. In 1955 Sylvester served as Task Force commander for Operation Wigwam, a test of an underwater detonation of a nuclear bomb. He served as Commander, Amphibious Forces, United States Pacific Fleet, from 1958 to 1960. From 1960 to 1965 he served as Deputy Chief of Naval Operations for Logistics, and retired in 1965 with the rank of vice admiral.

Sylvester died on July 26, 1990, at Georgetown University Hospital in Washington, D.C.

== Personal life ==
Sylvester's first wife was Ruth Yarnell, who died in 1948. His second wife was Geraldine Clark. One of his sons would go on to attend the United States Naval Academy, so too would two grandsons. A second son, John Sylvester, Jr., would join the Foreign Service and, driven by the family connection to East Asia, serve a variety of tours in Japan and South East Asia in the 1960s.
