= Warren's Mill =

- U.S. National Register of Historic Places
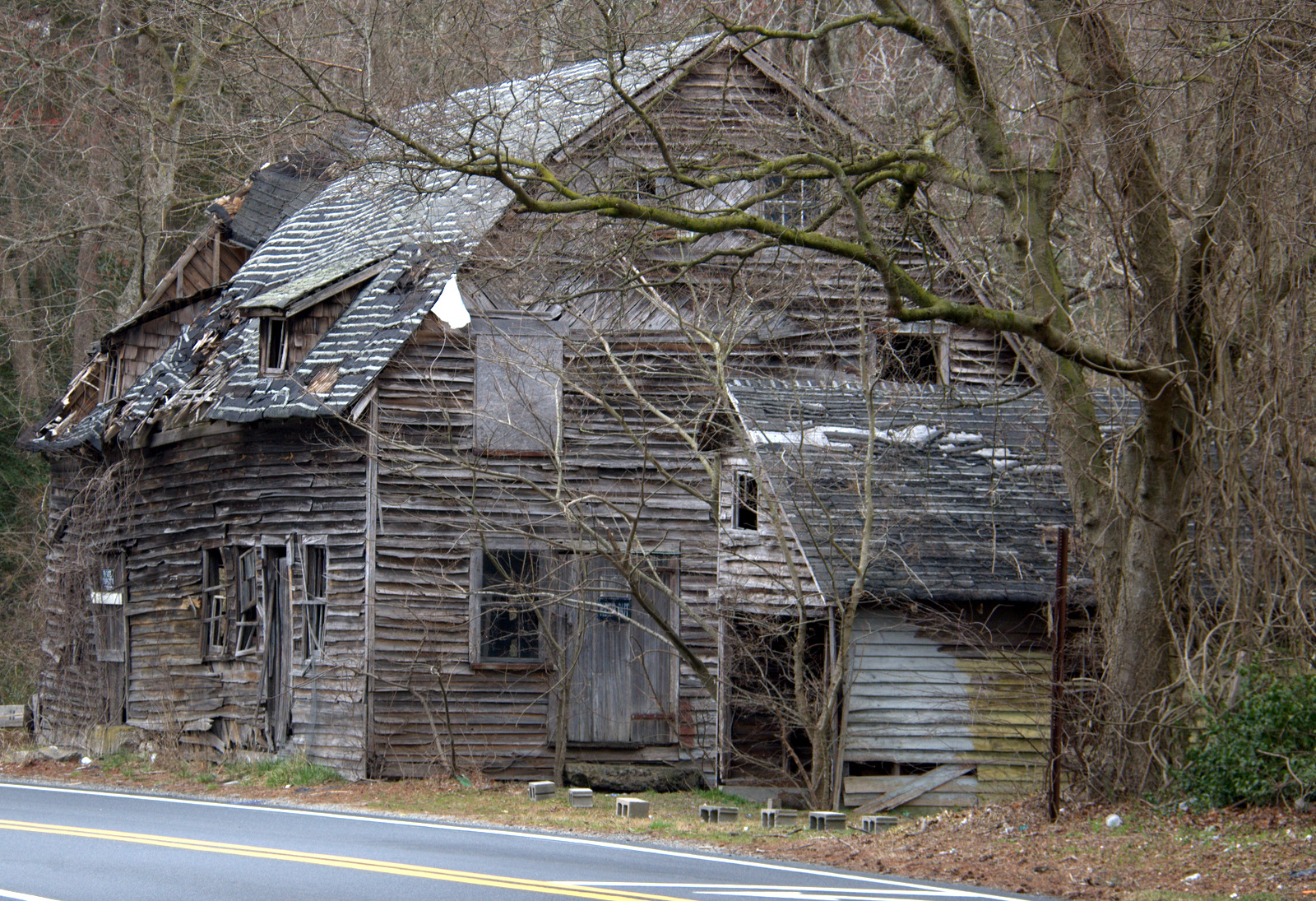

- Location within Delaware Location within the United States
- Location: Northwest of Millsboro on Road 326, near Millsboro, Delaware
- Coordinates: 38°35′45.2934″N 75°18′13.5354″W
- Area: 0.5 acres (0.20 ha)
- Built: c. 1910–1918
- NRHP reference No.: 78000923
- Added to NRHP: September 13, 1978

Warren's Mill is a historic grist mill located near Millsboro, Sussex County, Delaware. The mill was built in 1910–18, and is a large two-story, large, rectangular, frame structure sheathed in clapboard and with a gambrel roof. It sits on a poured concrete foundation and has a concrete spillway. Also on the property is a contributing shed frame, with clapboard siding and a shingled gable roof.

It was added to the National Register of Historic Places in 1978.
