= Ames Hitchens Chicken Farm =

- U.S. National Register of Historic Places
- Location within Delaware Location within the United States
- Location: North of Delaware Route 24, near Millsboro, Delaware
- Coordinates: 38°36′25″N 75°13′6″W
- Area: 3 acres (1.2 ha)
- MPS: Nanticoke Indian Community TR
- NRHP reference No.: 79003311
- Added to NRHP: April 26, 1979

Ames Hitchens Chicken Farm was a historic home and farm located near Millsboro, Sussex County, Delaware. It included a two-story, wood frame, gable front dwelling and two long, one-story, flatroofed buildings, used as chicken houses. It was the last of these structures still standing within the Indian River Nanticoke Indian Association community.

It was added to the National Register of Historic Places in 1979. It is listed on the Delaware Cultural and Historic Resources GIS system as destroyed or demolished.
