= Harmony Church =

Historic church in Delaware, United States

- U.S. National Register of Historic Places
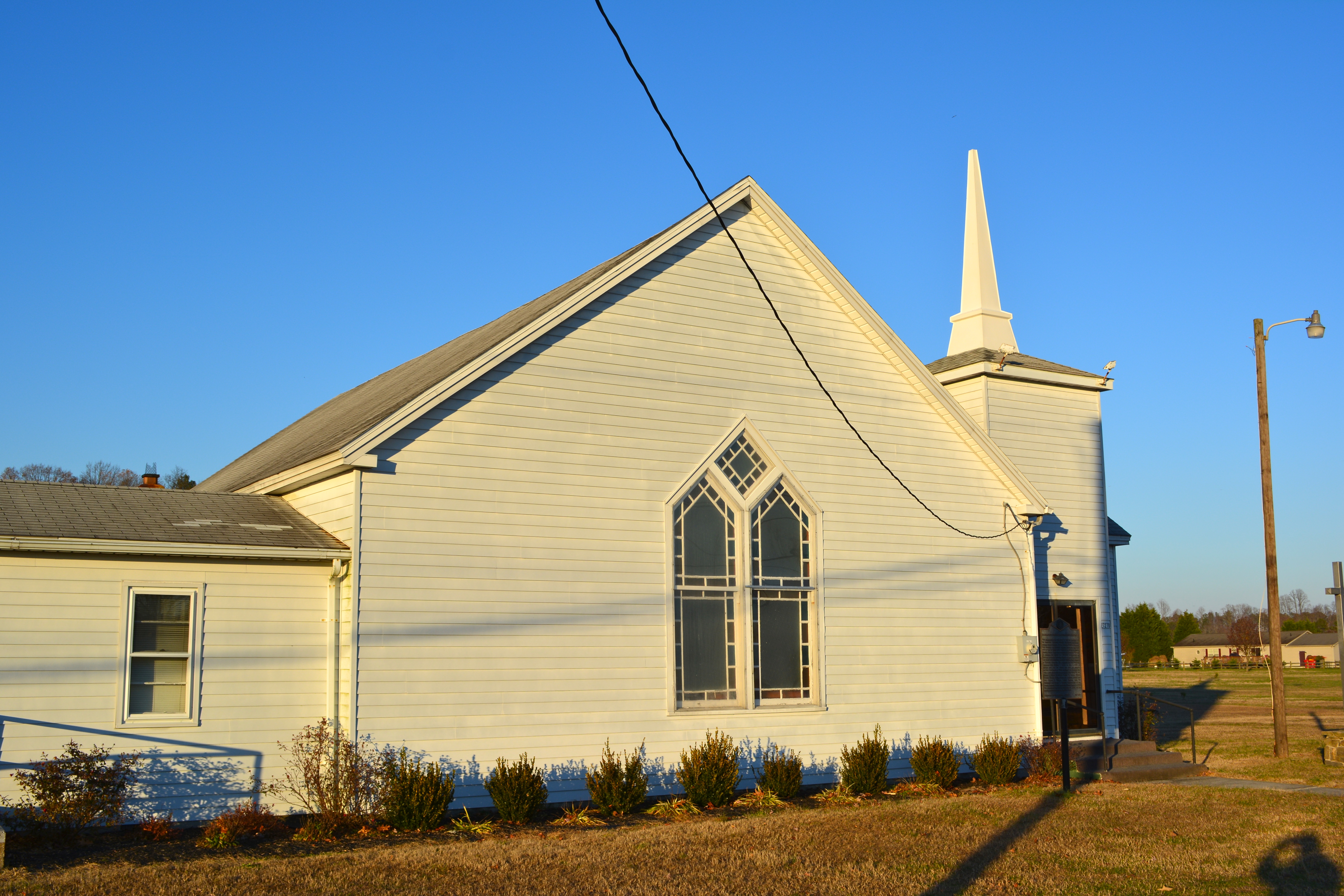

- Location within Delaware Location within the United States
- Location: Delaware Route 24, east of Road 313, Millsboro, Delaware
- Coordinates: 38°36′21″N 75°13′8″W
- Area: 1 acre (0.40 ha)
- Built: 1891
- Architectural style: Late Gothic Revival
- MPS: Nanticoke Indian Community TR
- NRHP reference No.: 79003308
- Added to NRHP: April 26, 1979

Harmony Church is a historic Methodist Episcopal church near Millsboro in Sussex County, Delaware. It was built in 1891, and is a one-story, wood-frame building covered with asbestos siding and in the Late Gothic Revival style. It has a two-story wing and sits on a rock-faced, concrete block foundation. It features a two-story crenellated tower. The congregation was organized in 1818. The Indian Mission Church of the Nanticoke Indian Association was formed from Harmony Church after members of the Nanticoke Indian Association objected to the hiring of an African American minister.

It was added to the National Register of Historic Places in 1979.

== See also ==
- Historical Marker Database: Harmony United Methodist Church
- Delaware Public Archives: Harmony United Methodist Church marker
