= Harmon School (Millsboro, Delaware) =

- U.S. National Register of Historic Places
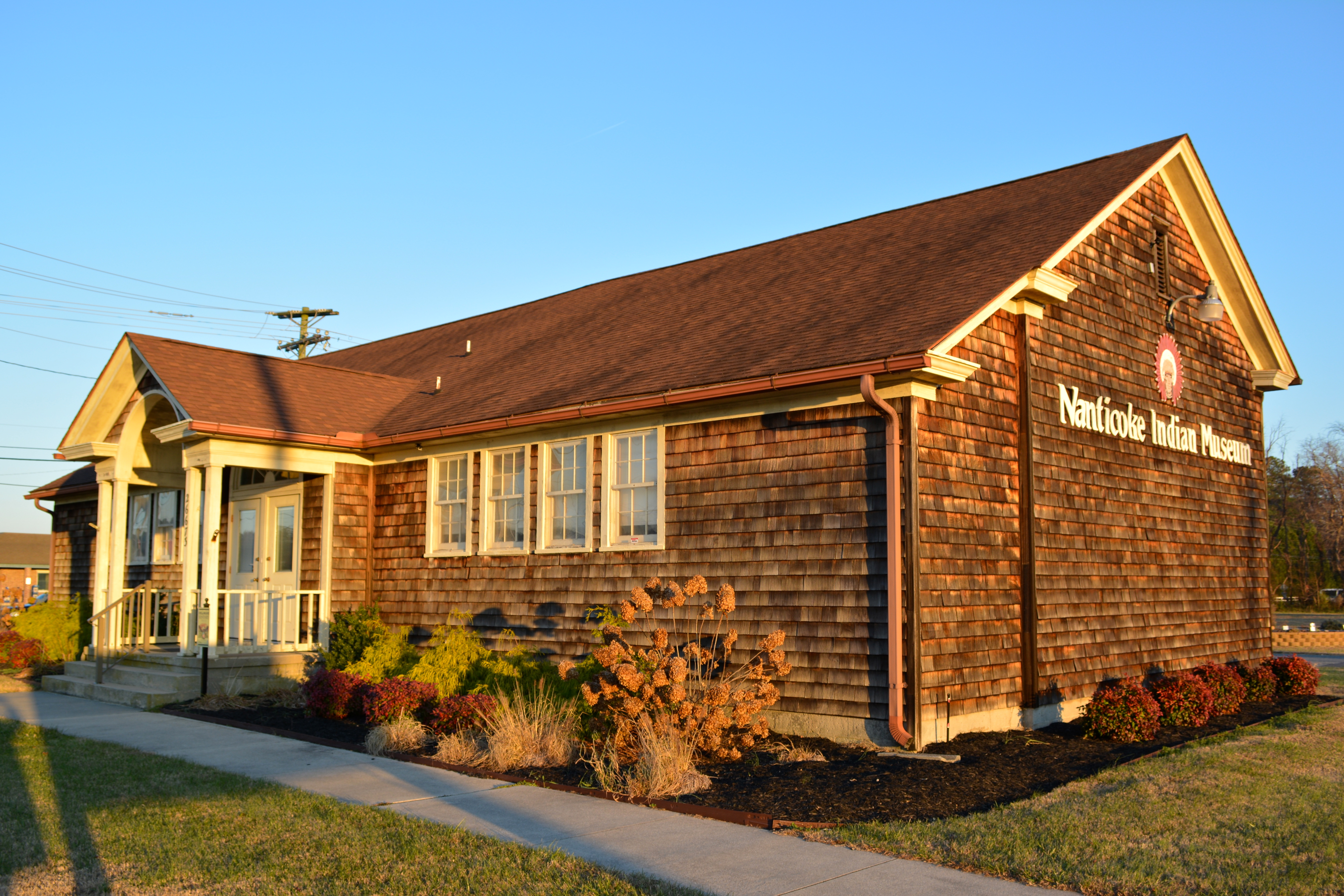

- Location within Delaware Location within the United States
- Location: 26673 John J. Williams Hwy., Millsboro, Delaware
- Coordinates: 38.6141°N 75.2023°W
- Area: 2.7 acres (1.1 ha)
- Architectural style: Colonial Revival
- MPS: Nanticoke Indian Community TR
- NRHP reference No.: 79003314
- Added to NRHP: April 26, 1979

Harmon School, also known as Warwick No. 225, is a historic rural school building located near Millsboro, Sussex County, Delaware. It was built in the early 1920s, and is a one-story, frame structure with wood shingles in the Colonial Revival style. It sits on a concrete foundation and has a gable roof and large, square brick central chimney. The front facade features a central pedimented portico with four square columns and two square pilasters.

The Harmon School was originally built to be used exclusively for students of the state-recognized Nanticoke Indian Association until after a new public school was constructed in the 1920s. This was to accommodate all students of color (minority students) at a time of racial segregation in the state. When African American teachers and students became part of the new school, Nanticoke Indian Association parents withdrew their children and established the Indian Mission School for their separate education.

Later the Nanticoke Indian Association adapted the Harmon School to serve as its Nanticoke Indian Museum. The building was added to the National Register of Historic Places in 1979.

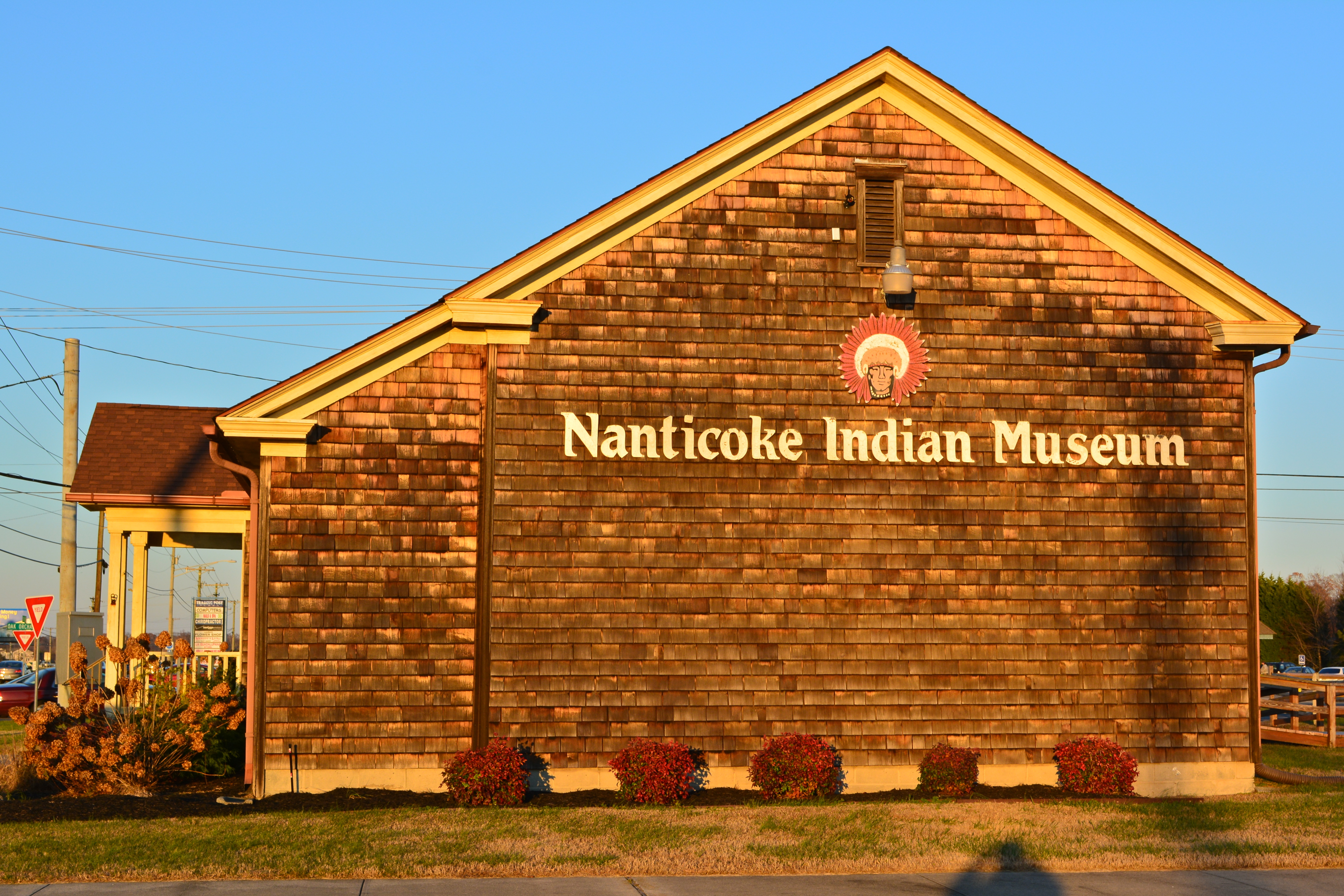
