= Isaac Harmon Farmhouse =

Historic house in Delaware, United States

- U.S. National Register of Historic Places
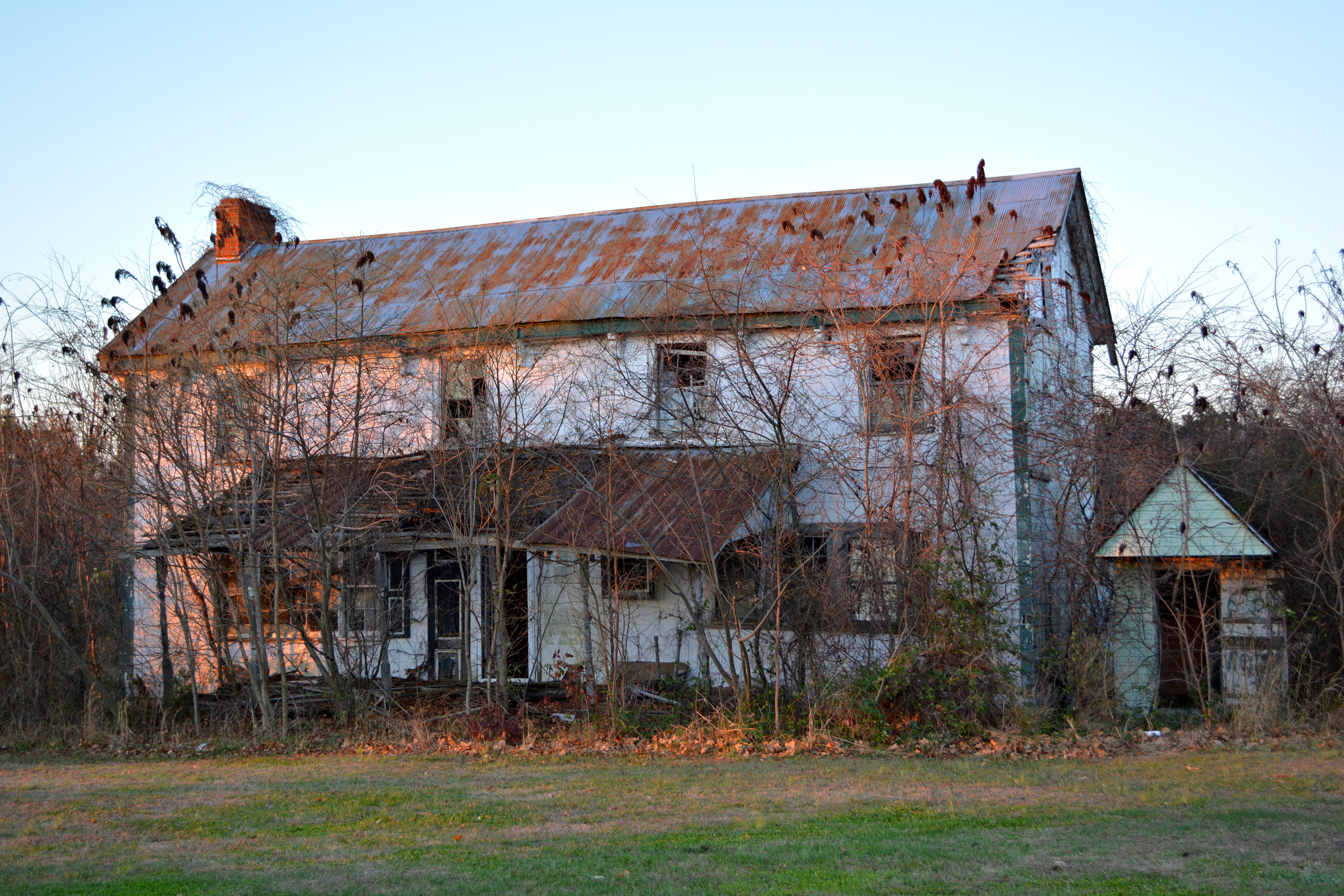

- Location within Delaware Location within the United States
- Location: Road 312A, near Millsboro, Delaware
- Coordinates: 38°35′56″N 75°11′55″W
- Area: 1 acre (0.40 ha)
- Built: c. 1845
- MPS: Nanticoke Indian Community TR
- NRHP reference No.: 79003315
- Added to NRHP: April 26, 1979

Isaac Harmon Farmhouse is a historic farmhouse located near Millsboro, Sussex County, Delaware. It was built about 1845, and is a two-story, four-bay, single pile, wood frame dwelling clad in clapboard. It has a gable roof pierced by interior end brick chimneys. It was one of the first properties in the Indian River community to be owned by a family of the Nanticoke Indian Association. Isaac Harmon was one of the leaders in the Nanticoke Indian Association separatist movement of the 1880s, which grew out of the mixed-race community of Delaware Moors.

It was added to the National Register of Historic Places in 1979.
