= Indian Mission Church =

Historic church in Delaware, United States

- U.S. National Register of Historic Places
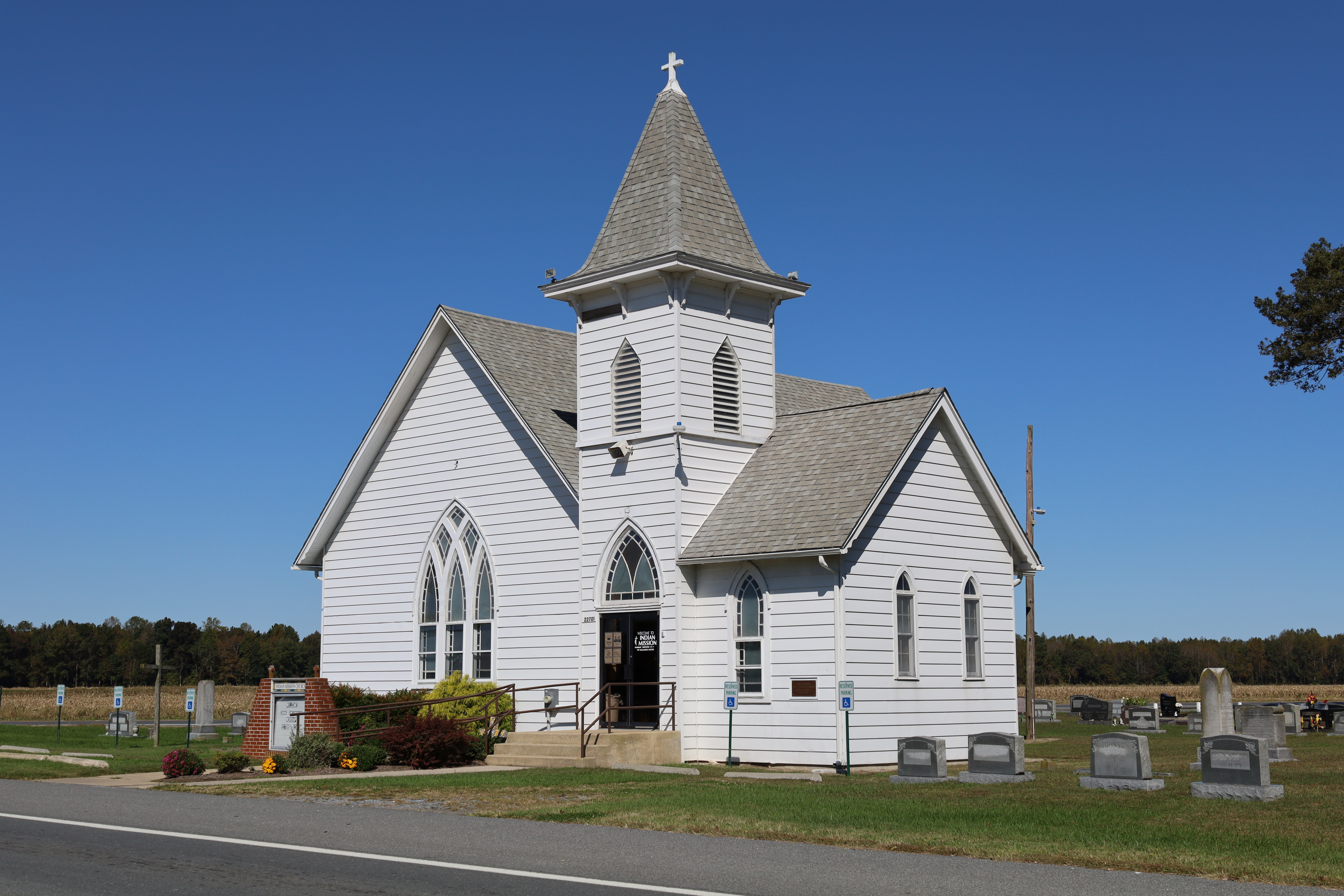

- Location within Delaware Location within the United States
- Location: Junction of Delaware Route 5 and Road 48, Millsboro, Delaware
- Coordinates: 38°40′25″N 75°14′5″W
- Area: 1 acre (0.40 ha)
- Built: 1921
- Architectural style: Late Gothic Revival
- MPS: Nanticoke Indian Community TR
- NRHP reference No.: 79003307
- Added to NRHP: April 26, 1979

Indian Mission Church is a historic Methodist church located near Millsboro, Sussex County, Delaware. It was built in 1921, and is a one-story, wood-frame building covered with clapboard siding and in the Late Gothic Revival style. It features a two-story hipped roof tower and lancet windows. The congregation was organized in 1881 from the Harmony Church after families of the Nanticoke Indian Association separated after they objected to the hiring of an African American minister.

It was added to the National Register of Historic Places in 1979.

== See also ==
- Indian Mission School
