= Johnson School (Millsboro, Delaware) =

- U.S. National Register of Historic Places
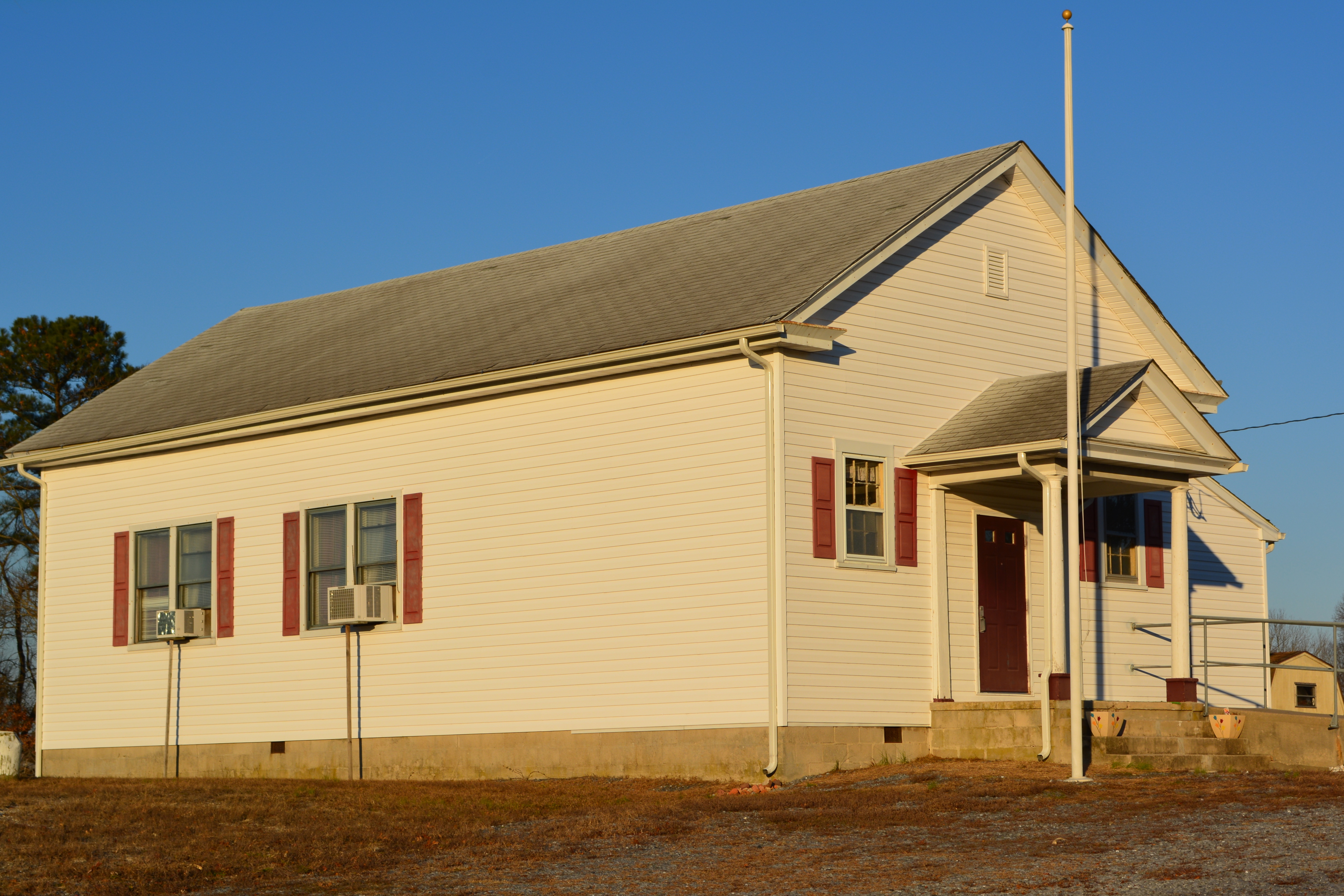

- Location within Delaware Location within the United States
- Location: South of junction of Delaware Route 24 and Road 297, near Millsboro, Delaware
- Coordinates: 38°36′13″N 75°13′50″W
- Area: less than one acre
- Architectural style: Colonial Revival
- MPS: Nanticoke Indian Community TR
- NRHP reference No.: 79003313
- Added to NRHP: April 26, 1979

Johnson School, also known as Warwick No. 203, is a historic rural school building located near Millsboro, Sussex County, Delaware. It was built in the early 1920s, and is a one-story, three-bay, frame structure with wood shingles in the Colonial Revival style. It has a gable roof and features a pedimented entrance portico supported by Doric order columns and plain pilasters. The Johnson School was a separate educational facility for Delaware Moors, and was attended by some children from families of the state-recognized Nanticoke Indian Association who claimed Nanticoke descent.

It was added to the National Register of Historic Places in 1979.

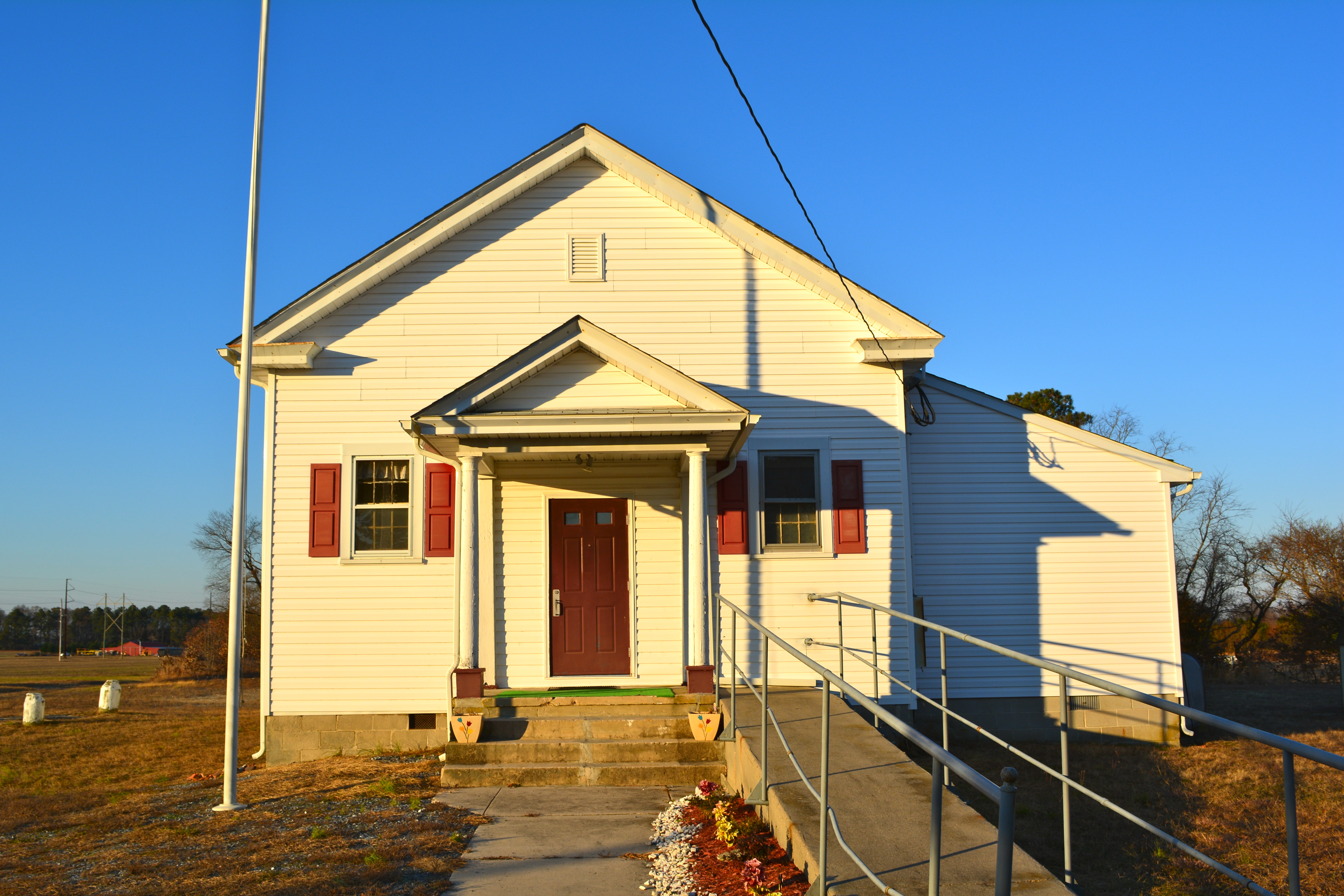
Front entrance
