= Harmon School (Fallon, Nevada) =

- U.S. National Register of Historic Places
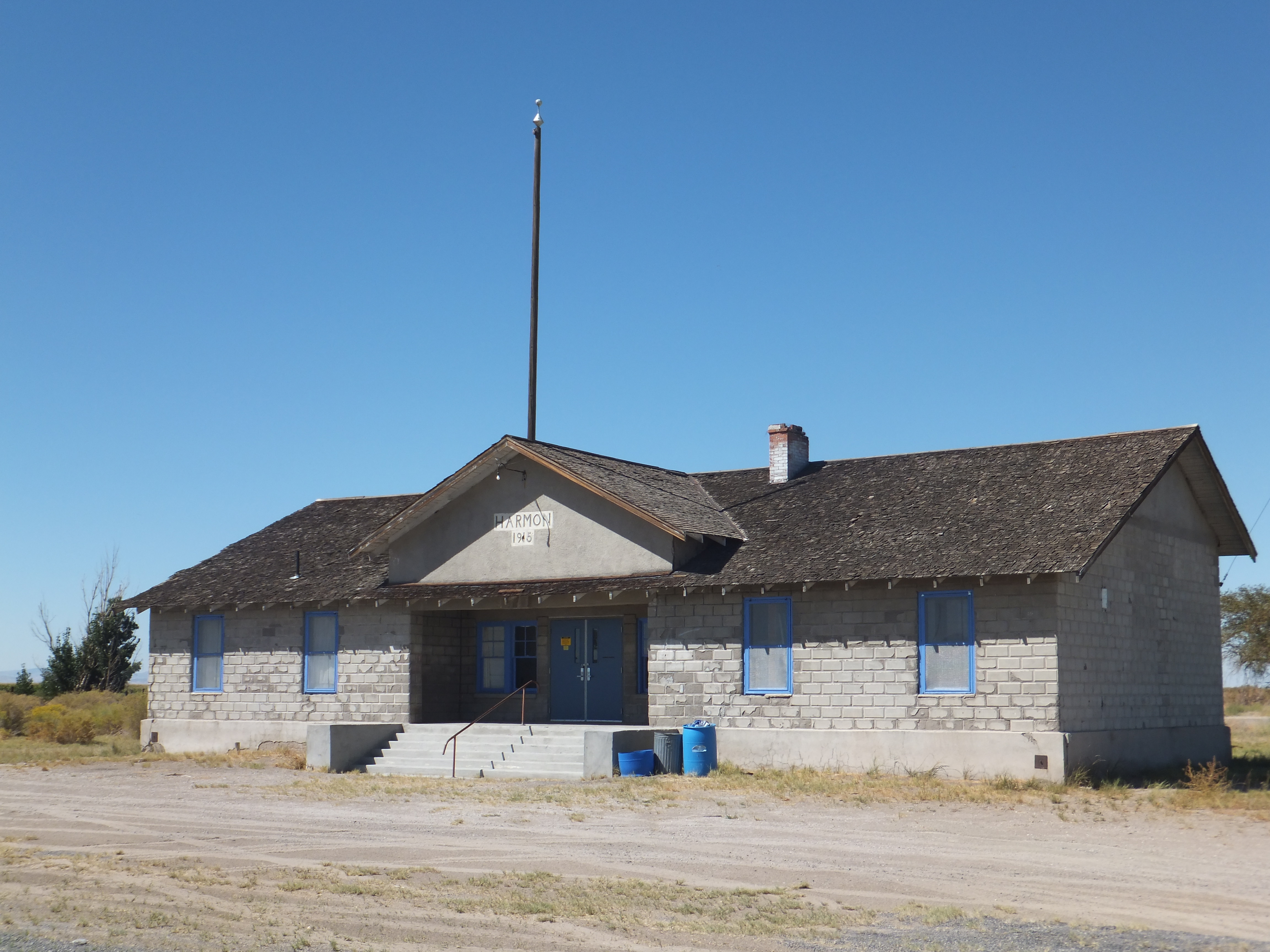
- School building in 2012

- Location within Nevada Location within the United States
- Location: Junction of Kirn Rd. and Harmon Rd.
- Nearest city: Fallon, Nevada
- Coordinates: 39°29′26″N 118°41′17″W
- Area: 10 acres (4.0 ha)
- Built: 1915
- Built by: Kaiser, Lon (contractor); Wildes, Mark (carpenter)
- NRHP reference No.: 89000055
- Added to NRHP: May 23, 1989

The Harmon School, at Kirn Rd. and Harmon Rd. near Fallon, Nevada, is a historic building that is listed on the U.S. National Register of Historic Places. The listing included three contributing buildings on 10 acres (4.0 ha). It has served as a school, as a meeting hall, and as a music facility.

According to its NRHP nomination in 1988, the school was deemed significant then as "the only intact, early twentieth century, rural school complex to be documented in the state", and as one of only two surviving rural schools in Churchill County.

== Description ==
The Harmon School is a 10-acre rural school complex which is positioned in the center of the Harmon District of Churchill County, Nevada. The plot is situated about six miles from the town of Fallon and is bounded to the south by using Kirn Road and to the east by means of North Harmon Road. The place is dominated with the aid of single-own family farms ranging in length from eighty to 180 acres. The nominated area carries a considerable one-story masonry school house; a modest, sole story frame teacherage and a lone story pump residence. All 3 structures are traditionally and functionally associated and are taken into consideration contributing assets.

The Harmon School building is a coursed concrete block structure which was built in 1915 to serve rural Nevada’s Harmon District. The balanced, 5-bay building is supported through a raised, concrete foundation and ends in a cross gable roof with projecting eaves and open rafters. 2 internal brick chimneys with straight stacks and corbelled caps punctuate the main roof plane. The building is exposed to the south and takes up a "T" plan fashioned by a center hall, flanking classrooms and a rear auditorium. A halfway basement is found underneath the auditorium and it also has a kitchen. In 1935, the area of the back auditorium was expanded by a 2-bay frame and stucco addition.

== History ==
The Harmon School is appreciable on the regional stage for its affiliation with the development of public schooling in Nevada. Besides, it is known as an instance of an early 20th century rural school edifice. Built between 1915 and 1916, the School performed as the Harmon District’s Elementary School from its construction till county school consolidation in 1956. The Biennial Report of the Superintendent Public Instruction for 1915-16 marked the Harmon School as one of the greatest rural schools. It was also known for its use as a noted community and social center. From early 20th century’s schools of the state, the Harmon School is the sole intact rural school compound to be documented. It is also one in all two rural schools to live on in Churchill County.
