= Indian Mission School =

- U.S. National Register of Historic Places
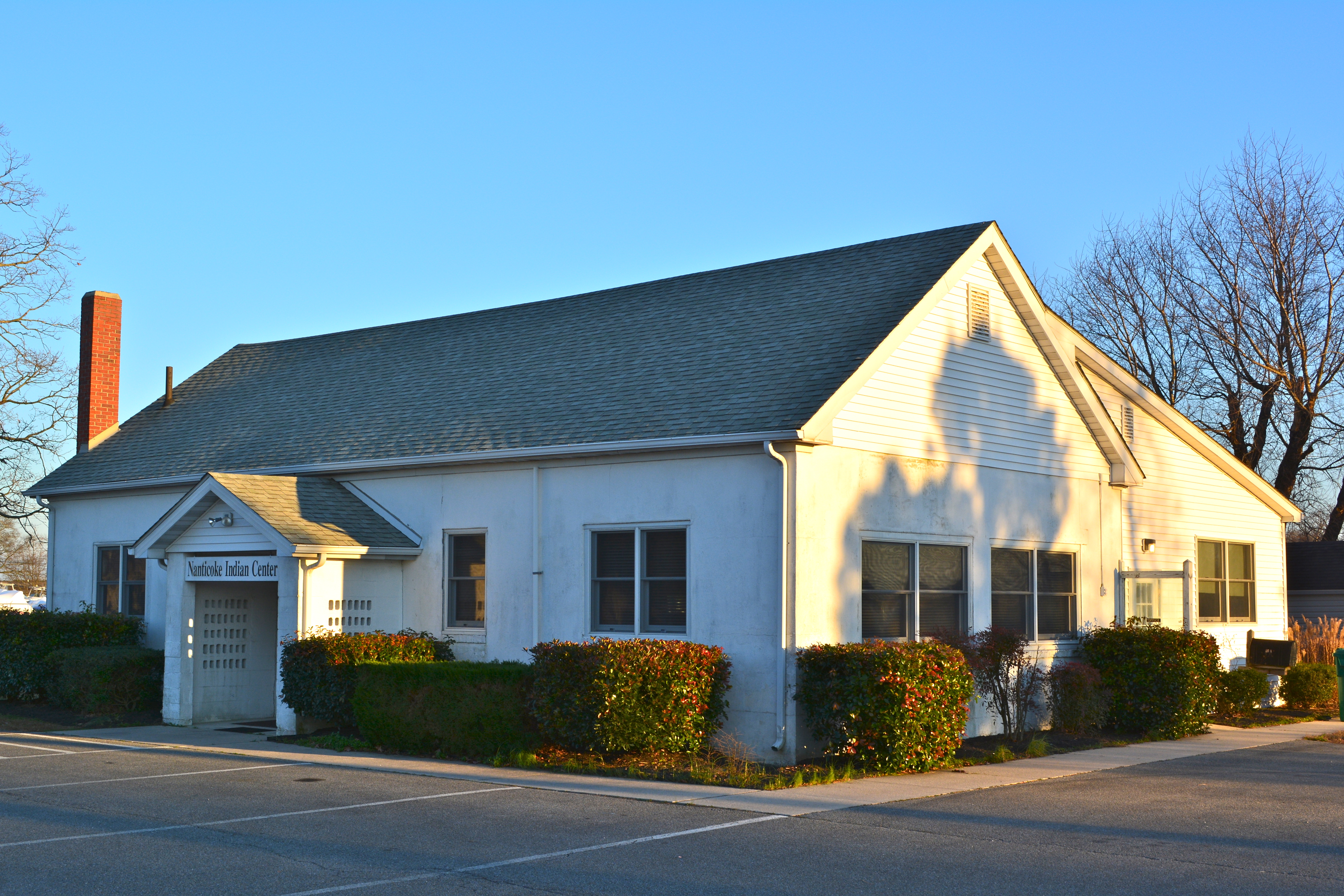

- Location within Delaware Location within the United States
- Location: 27073 John J. Williams Hwy., Millsboro, Delaware
- Coordinates: 38°36′22″N 75°12′42″W
- Area: 1 acre (0.40 ha)
- Built: 1948
- MPS: Nanticoke Indian Community TR
- NRHP reference No.: 79003312
- Added to NRHP: April 26, 1979

Indian Mission School, also known as the Nanticoke Indian Center, is a historic school building located near Millsboro, Sussex County, Delaware. It was built in about 1948, after the original school was destroyed by fire. It is a one-story, stuccoed masonry building with a gable roof. It features a concrete block covered entrance. The school was organized after school reforms of the early 20th century mandated that children from families of the state-recognized Nanticoke Indian Association be placed in the same schools as African-American students. Members of the Nanticoke Indian Association objected to being viewed as Black and did not wish to attend the same schools as Black people.

It was added to the National Register of Historic Places in 1979.

== See also ==
- Indian Mission Church
