= Robert Davis Farmhouse =

Historic house in Delaware, United States

- U.S. National Register of Historic Places
- Location within Delaware Location within the United States
- Location: South of Delaware Route 24, near Millsboro, Delaware
- Coordinates: 38°36′30″N 75°12′13″W
- Area: 3 acres (1.2 ha)
- Built: c. 1900
- MPS: Nanticoke Indian Community TR
- NRHP reference No.: 79003309
- Added to NRHP: April 26, 1979

Robert Davis Farmhouse was a historic farmhouse located near Millsboro, Sussex County, Delaware. It was built about 1900, as a two-story, five-bay, single pile, wood-frame building with asbestos siding. It had a gable roof, with a cross gable and lancet window. Also on the property were two contributing log corn cribs.

It was added to the National Register of Historic Places in 1979. It is listed on the Delaware Cultural and Historic Resources GIS system as destroyed or demolished.
