= Margaret Cornish =

Indentured servant and one of the first Africans in Virginia

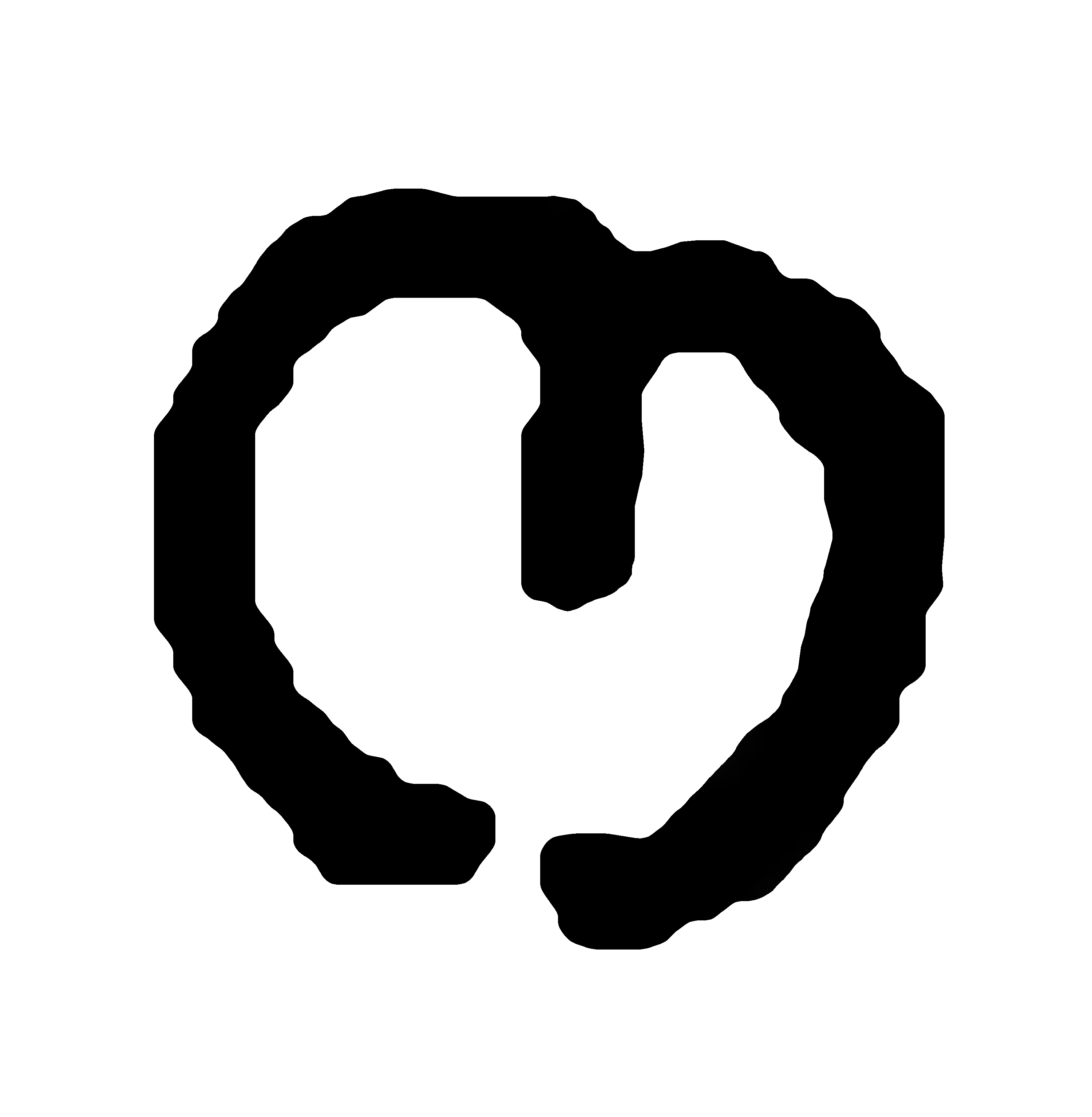
- Marke [sic] of Margaret Cornish. A mark(e) served as written authentication on documents in place of a signature.
- Born: Unknown c. 1610? Kingdom of Ndongo
- Died: After 1670
- Occupation: Indentured servant
- Employer: Robert Sheppard
- Known for: One of the first Africans in colonial Virginia
- Spouse(s): John Graweere, Robert Sweat (Sweet)
- Children: Mihill Gowen, Robert Cornish, William Sweet, Anthony Cornish, Jane Harman (née Sweat)

Margaret Cornish (Portuguese: Margarida; b. c. 1610? – living 1670) was a woman from the Kingdom of Ndongo (part of now Angola), who was one of the First Africans in Virginia. She was party to the first legal case regarding a Black person in the Colony of Virginia. Due to her early documentation, she is of relevance to academics studying African-American genealogy. A historical fiction trilogy, Fate & Freedom, narrates her life as a slave in the colony.

== Biography ==
Margaret (originally Margarida) was born in the Kingdom of Ndongo (now Angola), around 1610, and was later baptized a Catholic. She was taken as a slave by the San Juan Bautista, which was plundered by the two privateer ships, the White Lion and the Treasurer, the former of which brought her to Jamestown, Virginia in 1619. By 1625, she came to be owned by Robert Sheppard, an English planter and Burgess for James City County. In 1630, she was convicted of fornication after having sex with Hugh Davis, an Englishman; he himself was whipped in front of a crowd as punishment. Historian Calvin Schermerhorn noted his punishment was worse than what was typically administered for fornication. The case was the first involving a Black person in the colony.

=== Marriages ===
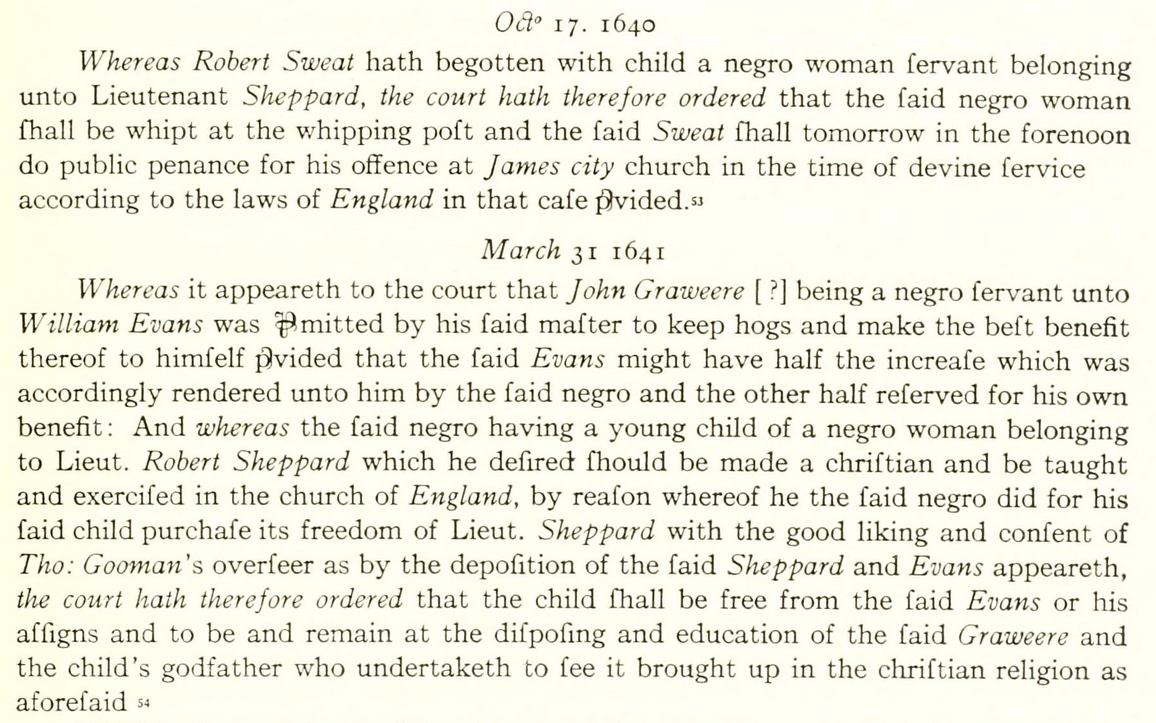
Court orders pertaining to Margaret, Graweere, Sweat, and Mihill, 1640-1641 ce, wherein Margaret is referred to as "a negro woman"

==== Marriage to John Graweere ====
During her time as a slave in Virginia, she married John Graweere, and had a child with him in 1635. This child legally became a slave of Sheppard, due to his mother being a slave. On Oct. 17th, 1640, she and Robert Sweat, the son of a member of the Virginia General Assembly in Jamestown, were convicted of fornication by Francis Wyatt after she gave birth to a mixed-race child via Sweat. In response, Graweere petitioned for custody of their three year-old son Mihill from Sheppard in 1641, which he obtained. Margaret received thirty lashes at the whipping post as punishment, while Sweat wore a white sheet in church as an alternative sentence, to show his humility and penance.

Scholar Sheryll Cashin suggested Sweat received a lighter punishment due to his class status, while anthropologist Jill E. Rowe posed that the authorities were not reacting to Margaret's fornication, but her miscegenation with a white man, seeing it as a social ill.

==== Marriage to Robert Sweat and later life ====
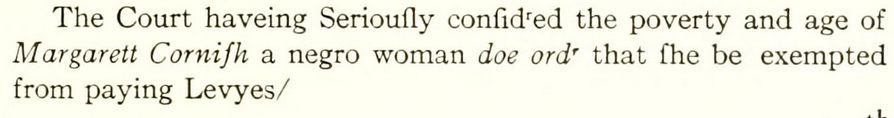
Court orders pertaining to Margaret Cornish's exemption from taxes, 1670 ce.

Margaret later married Sweat, having three more children with him. He did not purchase her or their children's freedom from slavery. She was later emancipated by Sheppard because of her old age, as she had become less useful to his family. She moved to Lawnes Creek Parish, where on October 10th, 1670, she was exempted from taxes due to her old age and poverty.

== Descendants ==
Mihill was indentured to Christopher Stafford of Martin's Hundred until aged 21, during which time he had a child with the African slave Prossa (Kimbundu: Pallassa). He later freed his son and moved to Merchant's Hundred, James City County, where he started a 30-40 acre tobacco farm, and married a white woman. Many of his descendants later resided in Granville County.

Margaret's daughter Jane was adopted by Emanuel Driggus; in 1652 he sold some of his livestock to purchase her freedom. In 1666, the then-widowed Jane married the free Black man William Harman, who offered her a horse as jointure for the marriage. They moved to Northampton County and had six children, the eldest later becoming a servant to John Custis.

Many descendants of Margaret and Graweere became Patriots in the 18th century, serving in the American Revolution. Some fought under Francis Marion and Richard Winn in South Carolina.

=== Later families ===
Map of Goins families, 1790-1830, with racial census data included.

The Sweat (Sweet), Cornish, and Gowen families descended from Margaret intermarried with other free Tidewater Virginia families such as the Driggers family descended from Emanuel Driggus. Their surnames are now carried by Melungeons, such as those with the surname Goins, whom are descended directly from Margaret and Graweere. Some Sweats were related to the Perkins family of the Redbones, while others married into the Pamunkey of Virginia. Conversely, some enlisted in campaigns against the Cherokee, and a few were among the first Americans to cross the Mississippi River into the American West.

In the 20th century, the first person of color admitted to a white Southern university was a descendant of Margaret Cornish. Today, multiple African-American and European-American families are her lineal descendants.

== Fictional works ==
Fate and Freedom, a historical fiction trilogy by Kathryn Knight, narrates Margaret's life beginning with her abduction from her village. Later being escorted by the sympathetic captain of the White Lion to 17th century England, she witnesses the backdrop of Protestant-Catholic sectarianism. The series progresses to her adulthood with Graweere, as they attempt to preserve the future of their children in the face of slavery.

== See also ==
- African-American history
- African Americans in Virginia
- Angela (enslaved woman)
- Anthony Johnson (colonist)
- Brass Ankles
- Carmel Melungeons
- Eddie Sweat
- Edray Herber Goins
- Eleanor Butler
- Female slavery in the United States
- Free Black people
- Gabriel Jacobs
- Glenn Goins
- Heman Marion Sweatt
- Herbie Goins
- History of slavery in Virginia
- Sweatt v. Painter
- Virginia General Assembly
