= Reytory Angola =

Black landowner in colonial New York

Reytory Angola (Note: She is also referred to in records as Dorothy Angola and Dorothy Creole.) (c. 1626 – 1689) was a woman from New Amsterdam of African descent. Brought to the colony as a slave of the Dutch West India Company, she received conditional manumission in 1644. In 1661, she became the first person of African descent to petition a legislature as an individual when she successfully requested the manumission of her adopted son.

== Biography ==
The early life of Reytory Angola is largely unknown. From her last name, it can be surmised that she was likely from Angola. She was brought to New Amsterdam as a slave of the Dutch West India Company sometime between 1626 and 1640. In addition to her native language and Dutch, she likely also spoke Spanish and Portuguese. While enslaved, Reytory was likely a house slave, though female slaves in New Amsterdam were sometimes also made to help male slaves in the construction of homes and roads. Sometime around 1640, she married Paulo d'Angola – who was one of the first enslaved people brought to New Amsterdam – though it is not known if the marriage was recognized by the Dutch Reformed Church in New Amsterdam.

Reytory first appears in the historical record in 1643, when she witnessed the baptism of her godson Cleyn Anthony at a Dutch Reformed Church. When Anthony's mother died several weeks after giving birth, Reytory and her husband adopted the child. Later in 1643, she and her husband were loaned by the Company to a visiting sea captain named Johann de Fries, who was fighting in Kieft's War. Reytory likely gave birth to the captain's son Jan. When the captain died, she raised the child and managed his inheritance.

In February 1644, Paulo – who had been a slave of the Company for 15 years – successfully petitioned the director of New Netherland, Willem Kieft, for his and Reytory's freedom. They were granted conditional manumission so long as they paid a yearly tax in produce and livestock; failure to pay this tax would lead to re-enslavement. Additionally, any children they had or would have would be slaves of the Company. Reytory was also not given documentation, so her freedom was dependent on her husband's status. Kieft granted the couple six acres of land in a part of Manhattan then known as the Land of the Blacks due its high Black population, now Washington Square Park. Reytory inherited the land when her husband died in 1652 or 1653 while she was pregnant with their son Jacob. She remarried in 1653 to a free Black landowner named Emmanuel Pietersz.

With the assistance of Pietersz, Reytory petitioned the Dutch colonial administration in 1661 for the freedom of her adopted son Anthony, becoming the first individual Black person to petition a legislature. Reytory argued that Anthony was practically free as he had been raised without assistance from the Company. The colonial record states that "with the fruit of her hands' bitter toil, she reared him as her own child, and up to the present supported him, taking all motherly solicitude and care for him, without the aid of anyone in the world". Director Peter Stuyvesant agreed with this argument and granted Anthony a writ of manumission; Anthony was also named heir of his adopted parents' land. The New York Historical Society suggests that this likely indicates that Reytory had "acquired political and legal expertise during her years in the colony".

In 1664, the English conquered New Amsterdam and renamed it to New York. As the guarantees of freedom granted to Reytory's family came from the Dutch, it was unclear if they would be re-enslaved by the English, who were expanding slavery in their colonies. Stuyvesant advocated on behalf of the family, and the English confirmed their freedom and landholdings in 1667, though they "lived under the constant threat of re-enslavement" if the colonial laws changed. Reytory died in 1689.

== See also ==
- History of slavery in New York (state)
- First Africans in Virginia
- Angela (slave)
- Margaret Cornish
