= William Peirce (burgess) =

Early Virginia soldier and burgess

Lieutenant Governor William Peirce Esq.

Member of the Virginia Governor's Council
- In office 1632-43

Member of the House of Burgesses for James City, Colony of Virginia
- In office 1624-1625 Serving with Richard Kinsmeale or Kinsmyll
- Preceded by: William Powell
- Succeeded by: Humphrey Rashell

Personal details
- Born: ca. 1598 Essex England
- Died: before 1647 Colony of Virginia
- Spouse: Joan
- Children: Joan Peirce Rolfe
- Relatives: Elizabeth (granddaughter)
- Occupation: merchant, soldier, planter, politician

William Peirce (b. c. 1585–d. 1645-1647) emigrated with his family to the new Colony of Virginia, where he became a valued soldier, as well as a planter, merchant and politician. Although Peirce fought in several skirmishes with Native Americans and served in both houses of the Virginia General Assembly as well as helped topple governor John Harvey, today he may best be known as one of the first slaveowners in the colony.

== Early life ==
William Peirce (or Pierce) was born and married in England, where his name was common. Thus he is sometimes confused with another man who frequently sailed (in the same era) to the Plymouth Colony far to the north. In June 1609, this man sailed for the two year old Virginia Colony with his wife and daughter (both named Joan) in a nine-boat flotilla. In June 1609, Peirce sailed for Virginia with his family. While his wife and daughter arrived by the end of the year, Peirce was delayed until 1610 after his ship, the Sea Venture, shipwrecked in Bermuda. Another Bermuda castaway was John Rolfe, who would become the husband of Peirce's daughter (after outliving two previous wives).

== Career ==
Peirce had military training and used it, as the new colony threatened the interests of local indigenous people as well as prospective Dutch colonists. However, Peirce had not yet arrived when the Anglo-Powhatan Wars began in 1609, though he witnessed Governor George Yeardley's treaty with the Chickahominy people. In 1619, he, John Rolfe and another man went to Old Point Comfort to meet the Treasurer, which bore the first Africans to reach Virginia, and his household later included a Black woman who had arrived on that ship. Peirce was among the officers and troops responding to the massacres of 1622. Likewise, while Virginia colonists traded with the Dutch during his lifetime, the Anglo-Dutch wars erupted less than a decade after his death, and included an attack on Jamestown.

Peirce eventually built a store and what Sandys called the fairest house (a brick dwelling) in Jamestown, the colony's seat of government and main settlement. He also bought land nearby. As a government structure became established, and the countryside divided into shires, Peirce bought several land parcels. One that he bought with Rolfe and Smith, included 1700 acres on Mulberry Island (which later became Warwick County). Peirce also was one of three commissioners whom Virginia's governor designated to deal with the 1619 ship with enslaved Africans, and at least one of the first enslaved Africans, "Angela", lived at his house for eight years.

James City County voters elected Peirce as one of the men representing them in the House of Burgesses in 1624, and re-elected him in 1624. He was appointed to the legislature's higher branch, the Governor's Council (also known as the Council of State) in 1632, and was involved in the toppling the unpopular Governor Sir John Harvey in 1635. He was later recalled to England to face charges in the Star Chamber brought by John Harvey, (along with John Utie, Captain Samuel Matthews, and Governor John West) for a time, but the charges were eventually dropped and he returned to Virginia. He remained a council member until 1643, a few years before his death.

Notwithstanding Peirce's role in ousting Governor Harvey, Dame Elizabeth Harvey in 1644/1645 asked that he and Richard Kemp be substituted as trustees for Nansemond land held in trust for Samuel Stephens, her son by a previous marriage. The previous trustees were previously Capt. Samuel Mathews, Daniel Gookin, George Ludlow and Thomas Bernard.

== Personal life and genealogical complication ==
Various spellings of the relatively common English surname (Peirce, Pierce, Pearce or Pears) or abounded in this era, and another Englishman with the same name and also with a wife named "Joan" traveled about the same time to Plymouth Colony. Also, this man was long-lived for the era and of course many records have been lost over the centuries. One historian has noted two men who may have been his sons, or distantly or unrelated. Several years after this man's death, in 1655, Thomas Peirce lived on Mulberry Island in Warwick County, who may have been the same Thomas Peirce who in March 1676 patented 1655 acres on Mulberry Island. This William Peirce had patented land on Mulberry Island in 1619, but three years later Thomas Peirce who had been the sergeant at arms of the Virginia General Assembly in 1619 and the brother of London merchant and tailor Edward Peirce, died in the 1622 massacre (as did his wife and child). The other possibly related man was named William Peirce, who in 1649 patented 200 acres to the northwest in what was then Northumberland County (and which became Westmoreland County). That William Peirce participated in many land transactions in the drainage area of the Rappahannock River, became a justice of the Westmoreland County Court in 1661 (and remained such for three decades) and served as a burgess in 1680-1682. The Rappahannock watershed developed decades after the Jamestown/Mulberry Island area of the James River watershed, and again no record exists of a family relationship with this man, nor Edward nor Thomas Peirce.

== Death and legacy ==
Peirce's precise death date and burial place are unknown. He last appeared at a meeting of the Governor's Council in February 1644/45, and his widow remarried in 1646. Since the only records which remain and mention his descendants relate to his wife, his daughter and granddaughter Elizabeth, his relationship with William Pierce who served as a burgess after his death is presumed distant.
