= Free Blacks =

Historical American social class

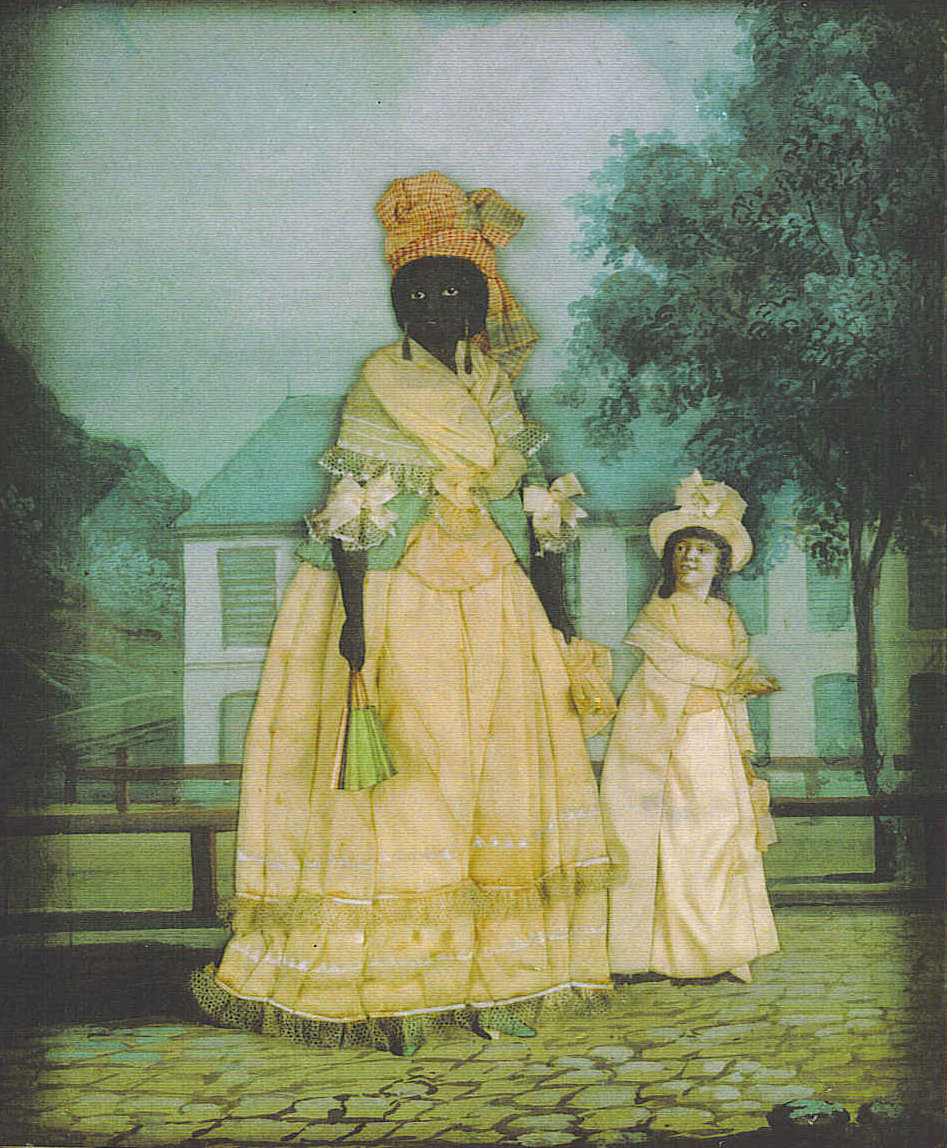
Late 18th-century painting of a free Black woman with her Quadroon daughter in New Orleans

Free Blacks, free Negros, and free coloreds were terms used in the Thirteen Colonies and United States prior to the abolition of American slavery in 1865 to describe African Americans who were not enslaved. The terms were used for both those who had been born into slavery and then manumitted and to those who had been born free whether or not they were of mixed-race descent.

== Background ==
Slavery was legal and practiced in every European colony in North America, at various points in history. Not all Africans who came to America were slaves; a few came even in the 17th century as free men, as sailors working on ships. In the early colonial years, some Africans came as indentured servants who were freed after a set period of years, as did many of the immigrants from Europe. Such servants became free when they completed their term of indenture; they were also eligible for headrights for land in the new colony in the Chesapeake Bay region, where indentured servants were more common. As early as 1678, a class of free black people existed in North America.

Various groups contributed to the growth of the free Negro population:

1. children born to colored free women (see Partus sequitur ventrem)
2. mulatto children born to white indentured or free women
3. mixed-race children born to free Native American women (the emancipation in the 1860s)
4. freed slaves
5. Maroons (or escaped slaves)
6. descendants of free black people who were never slaves

Black people's labor was of economic importance in the export-oriented tobacco plantations of Virginia and Maryland, and in the rice and indigo plantations of South Carolina. Between 1620 and 1780 about 287,000 slaves were imported into the Thirteen Colonies, or 5 percent of the more than six million slaves brought from Africa. The great majority of transported Africans were shipped to sugar-producing colonies in the Caribbean and to Brazil, where life expectancy was short and slave numbers had to be continually replenished; this could be done at relatively low costs until the Slave Trade Act 1807.

Slaves imported into Colonial America
Years	Number
1620–1700	21,000
1701–1760	189,000
1761–1770	63,000
1771–1780	15,000
Total	287,000

The life expectancy of slaves was much higher in the Thirteen Colonies than in Latin America, the Caribbean or Brazil. This, combined with a very high birth rate, meant that the number of slaves grew rapidly, as the number of births exceeded the number of deaths, reaching nearly 4 million by the time of the 1860 United States census. From 1770 until 1860 the rate of natural population growth among American slaves was much greater than for the population of any nation in Europe, and was nearly twice as rapid as that of Britain. This was sometimes attributed to very high birth rates: "U.S. slaves, then, reached similar rates of natural increase to whites not because of any special privileges but through a process of great suffering and material deprivation".

The Southern Colonies (Maryland, Virginia, and Carolina) imported more slaves, initially from long-established European colonies in the West Indies. Like them, the mainland colonies rapidly increased restrictions that defined slavery as a racial caste associated with African ethnicity. In 1663 Virginia adopted the principle in slave law of partus sequitur ventrem, according to which children were born into the status of their mother, rather than taking the status of their father, as was then customary for English subjects under common law. Other colonies followed suit. This meant that children of slave mothers in colonial America were also slaves, regardless of their fathers' ethnicity. In some cases, this could result in a person's being legally white under Virginia law of the time, although born into slavery.

According to Paul Heinegg, most of the free black families established in the Thirteen Colonies before the American Revolution of the late 18th century descended from unions between white women (whether indentured servants or free) and African men (whether indentured servant, free, or enslaved). These relationships took place mostly among the working class, reflecting the fluid societies of the time. Because such mixed-race children were born to free women, they were free. Through use of court documents, deeds, wills, and other records, Heinegg traced such families from Virginia as the ancestors of nearly 80 percent of the free black people recorded in the 1790 United States census of North Carolina. In addition, slave owners manumitted slaves for various reasons: to reward long years of service, because heirs did not want to take on slaves, or to free slave concubines and/or their children. Slaves were sometimes allowed to buy their freedom; they might be permitted to save money from fees paid when they were "hired out" to work for other parties.

In the mid-to-late 18th century, Methodist and Baptist evangelists during the period of the First Great Awakening (c. 1730–1755) encouraged slave owners to free their slaves, in their belief that all men were equal before God. They converted many slaves to Christianity and approved black leaders as preachers; blacks developed their own strain of Christianity. Before the American Revolutionary War of 1775–1783, few slaves were manumitted; on the eve of the American Revolution, there was an estimated 30,000 free African Americans in Colonial America which accounts for about 5% of the total African American population with most of free African Americans being mixed race. Since the portion of free African Americans were so small and could possibly pass as white, they were not deemed a threat to the White population to warrant anti-black legislation. However, historian Ira Berlin states that this figure could be as high as 25 percent due to errors in census collection, ambiguous status of runaway slaves, white-passing persons, and slaves who lived as if they were free but did not have the papers to prove it.

=== After the revolution ===
The war greatly disrupted slave societies. Beginning with the 1775 proclamation of Lord Dunmore, governor of Virginia, the British recruited slaves of American revolutionaries to their armed forces and promised them freedom in return. The Continental Army gradually also began to allow blacks to fight, giving them promises of freedom in return for their service. Tens of thousands of slaves escaped from plantations or from other venues during the war, especially in the South. Some joined British lines or disappeared in the disruption of war. After the war, when the British evacuated New York in November 1783, they transported more than 3,000 Black Loyalists and thousands of other American Loyalists to resettle in Nova Scotia and in what became Upper Canada (part of present-day Ontario). A total of more than 29,000 Loyalist refugees eventually departed from New York City alone. The British evacuated thousands of other slaves when they left Southern ports, resettling many in the Caribbean and others in England.

In the first two decades after the war, the number and proportion of free Negroes in the United States rose dramatically: northern states abolished slavery, almost all gradually. But also many slave owners, in the Upper South especially, inspired by the war's ideals, manumitted their slaves. From 1790 to 1810, the proportion of free blacks in the Upper South rose from less than 1% to overall, and nationally, the proportion of free blacks among blacks rose to 13%. The spread of cotton cultivation in the Deep South drove up the demand for slaves after 1810, and the number of manumissions dropped after this period. In the antebellum period many slaves escaped to freedom in the North and in Canada by running away, assisted by the Underground Railroad, staffed by former slaves and by abolitionist sympathizers. Census enumeration found a total of 488,070 "free colored" persons in the United States in 1860.

== Abolitionism ==
Most organized political and social movements to end slavery did not begin until the mid-18th century. The sentiments of the American Revolution and the equality evoked by the Declaration of Independence rallied many black Americans toward the revolutionary cause and their own hopes of emancipation; both enslaved and free black men fought in the Revolution on both sides. In the North, slaves ran away from their owners in the confusion of war, while in the South, some slaves declared themselves free and abandoned their slave work to join the British.

=== After the revolution ===
In the 1770s, Black people throughout New England began sending petitions to northern legislatures demanding freedom; by 1800, all of the northern states had abolished slavery or set measures in place to gradually reduce it. While free, black people often had to struggle with reduced civil rights, such as restrictions on voting, as well as racism, segregation, or physical violence. Vermont abolished slavery in 1777, while it was still independent, and when it joined the United States as the 14th state in 1791 it was the first state to have done so. All the other Northern states abolished slavery between 1780 and 1804, leaving the slave states of the South as defenders of the "peculiar institution". Massachusetts abolished slavery in 1780, and several other Northern states adopted gradual emancipation. In 1804, New Jersey became the last original Northern state to embark on gradual emancipation. Slavery was prohibited in the federal Northwest Territory under the Northwest Ordinance of 1787, passed just before the U.S. Constitution was ratified. The free black population increased from 8% to 13.5% from 1790 to 1810; most of whom lived in the Mid-Atlantic States, New England, and the Upper South, where most of the slave population lived at the time.

The rights of free blacks fluctuated and waned with the gradual rise in power among poor white men during the late 1820s and early 1830s. The National Negro Convention movement began in 1830, with black men holding regular meetings to discuss the future of the black "race" in America; some women such as Maria Stewart and Sojourner Truth made their voices heard through public lecturing. The National Negro Convention encouraged a boycott of slave-produced goods. These efforts were met with resistance, however, as the early 19th century brought renewed anti-black sentiment after the spirit of the Revolution began to die down.

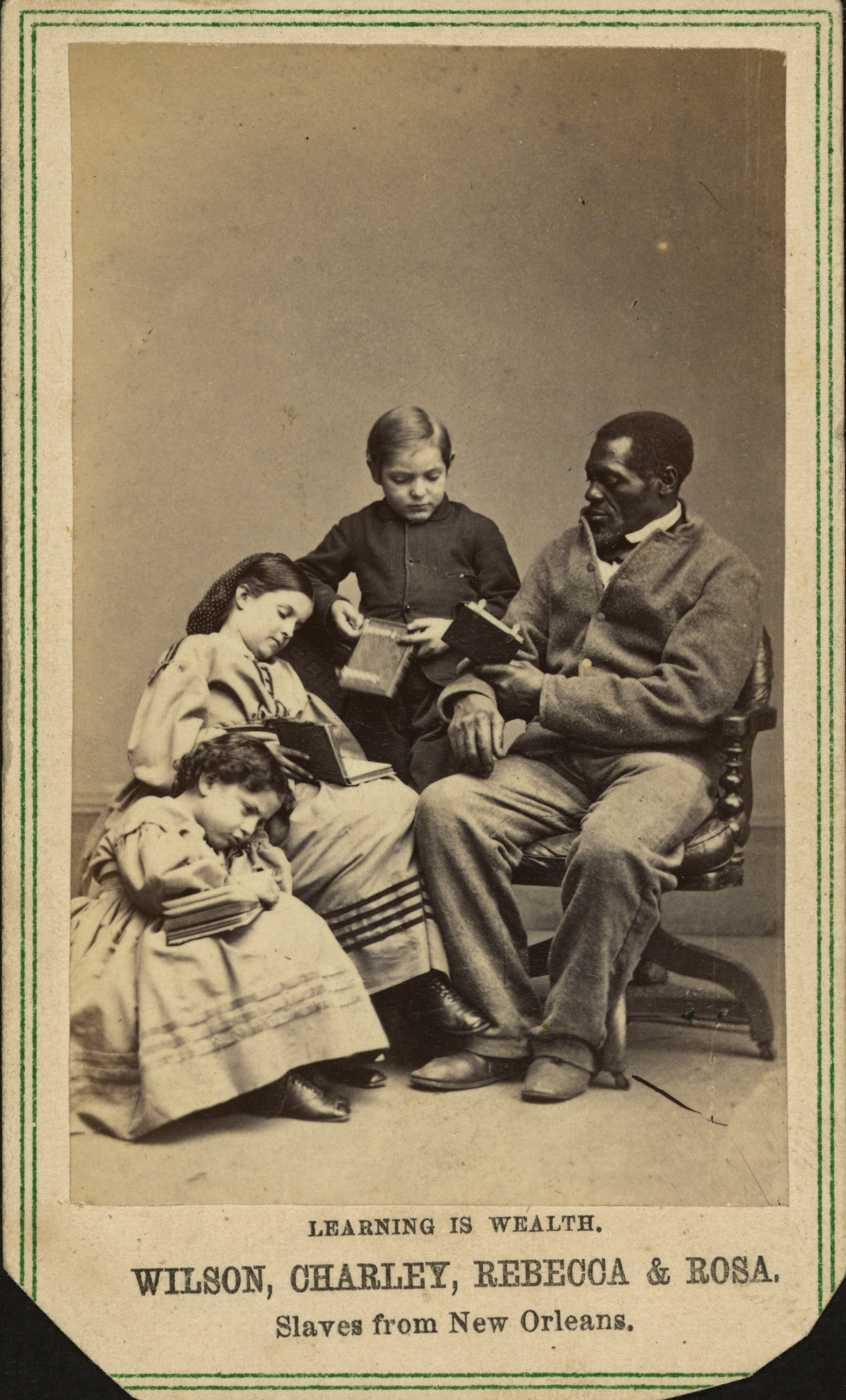
"Learning is wealth". Wilson, Charley, Rebecca, and Rosa. Mixed-race slaves from New Orleans

During the 1787 Philadelphia Convention which produced the United States Constitution, a compromise was proposed between northern states which only wanted to count free blacks in congressional apportionment (ignoring slave populations), and slave states which wanted full counting of the slave population. The compromise counted slave populations on the ratio of three-fifths, while free blacks were not subject to the compromise and counted as one full citizen for representation. Due to this compromise Southern states could count three-fifths of their slave populations toward the state populations for purposes of congressional apportionment and the electoral college. This additional counting of the slave population resulted in those states having political power in excess of the white voting population. The South dominated the national government and the presidency for years. Congress adopted legislation that favored slaveholders, such as permitting slavery in territories as the nation began to expand to the West. The Fugitive Slave Act of 1793 was strengthened by the Fugitive Slave Act of 1850, part of the Compromise of 1850, requiring even the governments and residents of free states to enforce the capture and return of fugitive slaves. Famous fugitives such as Frederick Douglass and Sojourner Truth gained the support of white abolitionists to purchase their freedom, to avoid being captured and returned to the South and slavery. In 1857, the ruling of Dred Scott v. Sandford effectively denied citizenship to black people of any status.

=== Black codes ===
Southern states also passed harsh laws regulating the conduct of free blacks, in several cases banning them from entering or settling in the state. In Mississippi, a free Negro could be sold into slavery after spending ten days in state. Arkansas passed a law in 1859 that would have enslaved every free black person still present by 1860; although it was not enforced, it succeeded in reducing Arkansas's population of free blacks to below that of any other slave state. A number of Northern states also restricted the migration of free blacks, with the result that emancipated blacks had difficulty finding places to legally settle.

=== Abolitionism ===
The abolitionist cause attracted interracial support in the North during the antebellum years. Under President Abraham Lincoln, Congress passed several laws to aid blacks to gain a semblance of freedom during the American Civil War; the Confiscation Act of 1861 allowed fugitive slaves who escaped to behind Union lines to remain free, as the military declared them part of "contraband" from the war and refused to return them to slaveholders; the Confiscation Act of 1862 guaranteed both fugitive slaves and their families everlasting freedom, and the Militia Act allowed black men to enroll in military service.

In January 1863, Lincoln's Emancipation Proclamation freed slaves in Confederate-held territory only. Black men were officially admitted to serve in the Union Army and the United States Colored Troops were organized. Black participation in fighting proved essential to Union victory.

=== After the Civil War ===
In 1865, the Union won the Civil War, and states ratified the Thirteenth Amendment, outlawing slavery (except as punishment for a crime) throughout the entire country. The Southern states initially enacted Black Codes in an attempt to maintain control over black labor. The Mississippi Black Code (the first to pass and the best known) distinguished between "free negroes" (referring to those who had been free before the war, in some places called "Old Issues"), (newly free) "freedmen", and "mulattoes" — though placing similar restrictions on freedom for all. US-born blacks gained legal citizenship with the Civil Rights Act of 1866, followed by the Fourteenth Amendment Citizenship Clause.

== Regional differences ==
=== Migration to cities ===
The lives of free blacks varied depending on their location within the United States. There was a significant free-black bias towards cities, as many rural free blacks migrated to cities over time, both in the North and the South. Cities were the chief destinations for migrating free blacks in the South, as cities gave free blacks a wider range of economic and social opportunities. Most southern cities had independently black-run churches as well as secret schools for educational advancement. Northern cities also gave blacks better opportunities. For example, free Negroes who lived in Boston generally had more access to formal education.

=== In the South ===
Before the American Revolution, there were very few free blacks in the Southern colonies. The Lower South, except for its cities, did not attract many free blacks. The number of urban free Negroes grew faster than the total free black population, and this growth largely came from a mass migration of rural free Negroes moving to cities, such as Richmond and Petersburg of Virginia, Raleigh and Wilmington of North Carolina, Charleston of South Carolina, and Savannah (and later Atlanta) of Georgia. The South overall developed two distinct groups of free Negroes. Those in the Upper South were more numerous: the 1860 census showed only 144 free Negroes in Arkansas, 773 in Mississippi, and 932 in Florida, while in Maryland there were 83,942; in Virginia, 58,042; in North Carolina, 30,463; and in Louisiana, 18,647. Free blacks in the Lower South were more urban, educated, wealthier, and were generally of mixed race with white fathers, compared to free blacks in the Upper South. Despite these differences, the Southern states passed similar laws to regulate black life, borrowing from one another.

==== Legislation against free Black people ====
The above numbers reflect a deliberate attempt to expel free Negroes from the deep South. "Southerners came to believe that the only successful means of removing the threat of free Negroes was to expel them from the southern states or to change their status from free persons to ... slaves." Free Negroes were perceived as "an evil of no ordinary magnitude," undermining the system of slavery. Slaves had to be shown that there was no advantage in being free; thus, free Negroes became victims of the slaveholders' fears. The legislation became more forceful; the free Negro had to accept his new role or leave the state. In Florida, for example, the legislation of 1827 and 1828 prohibited them from joining public gatherings and "giving seditious speeches", and laws of 1825, 1828, and 1833 ended their right to carry firearms. They were barred from jury service and from testifying against whites. To manumit (free) a slave, a master had to pay a tax of $200 each and had to post a bond guaranteeing that the free Negro would leave the state within 30 days. Eventually, some citizens of Leon County, Florida's most populous and wealthiest county (this wealth was due to the higher number of slaves in Leon County than any other county in Florida, who in the 1860 census constituted 73% of its population), petitioned the General Assembly to have all free Negroes removed from the state.

In Florida, legislation passed in 1847 required all free Negroes to have a white person as a legal guardian; in 1855, an act was passed which prevented free Negroes from entering the state. "In 1861, an act was passed requiring all free Negroes in Florida to register with the judge of probate in whose county they resided. The Negro, when registering, had to give his name, age, color, sex, and occupation and had to pay one dollar to register ... All Negroes over twelve years of age had to have a guardian approved by the probate judge ... The guardian could be sued for any crime committed by the Negro; the Negro could not be sued. Under the new law, any free Negro or mulatto who did not register with the nearest probate judge was classified as a slave and became the lawful property of any white person who claimed possession."

Free blacks were ordered to leave Arkansas as of January 1, 1860, or they would be enslaved. Most left.

==== Migration from South to North ====
Even with the presence of significant free black populations in the South, free blacks often migrated to Northern states. While this presented some problems, free blacks found more opportunities in the North overall. During the nineteenth century, the number and proportion of population of free blacks in the South shrank as a significant portion of the free black population migrated northward. Some of the more prominent and talented free black figures moved to the North for its opportunities, draining the South of potential free black leaders. Some returned after the Civil War to participate in the Reconstruction Era, establishing businesses and being elected to political office. This difference in the distribution of free blacks persisted until the Civil War, at which time about 250,000 free blacks lived in the South.

=== Migration via the frontier ===
Number of free black people per County in Virginia and North Carolina, 1790.

Free black people in the eastern United States became prominent before the solidification of chattel slavery in Virginia. According to genealogical records, some of the first ancestors of later communities categorized as free people of color in the eastern United States were free black people in Tidewater Virginia, such as Emanuel Driggus, John Graweere, Anthony Johnson, Gabriel Jacobs, and Emmanuel Cumbo (Cambow).

Free African-American communities formed around those who were able to obtain land grants on the edge of the expanding frontier, moving from Southampton County to Granville, to the interior of South Carolina, and later to Tennessee and Louisiana. Reports indicate attitudes towards these communities were kinder on the frontier, due to the need to rely on neighbors, low slave populations, and high land ownership by the free black community equalizing their status with white frontiersmen. In frontier counties such as Halifax, Edgecombe, and Granville, citizens would petition the government to repeal the specific taxes on free black people. Many of them would serve in the Revolutionary War, funding more land purchases. They would continuously emigrate and clear new lands due to persecution by newly settled whites, following the expanding frontier to maintain their place in society.

==== Free Black settlements ====
Free black people founded settlements on the frontier, such as Carthagena. Some of these settlements became used by the Underground Railroad, such as "Poke Patch" in Ohio. According to historical archives, these settlements operated as hubs for abolitionists and runaway slaves. A group of freed slaves known as the Randolph Freedpeople founded two settlements in Ohio, Rumley and Rossville, as well as Israel Hill in Virginia.

Some other notable free Black settlements on the frontier were Free Hill, Pocahontas Island, Pee Pee, and Chubbtown.

==== Population isolates ====
Some lighter-skinned descendants of free Black people formed distinct communities later on, such as the Melungeons, Brass Ankles, Lumbee, Redbones, and Carmelites. Some of them sought separate schools from freedmen during the Jim Crow Era. The "old issue negroes" of Person County were able to obtain separate schools, while others, such as the Melungeons and Louisiana Redbones, were sometimes able to attend white schools. Over time, some of them began to pass as white. Scholar Renate Bartl concludes a subset of free Black people adopted an "Indian" identity to avoid classification as Black or "colored". She stated that of the free Black origin isolates with no documented tribal ancestry, most possessed no past tribal descent or identity, instead adopting an identity later on. Bartl adds that in some cases, educated members of a community will design history and traditions for their group to obscure African-American descent.

== Opportunities for advancement ==
Free black people drew up petitions and joined the army during the American Revolution, motivated by the common hope of freedom. This hope was bolstered by the 1775 proclamation by British official Lord Dunmore, who promised freedom to any slave who fought on the side of the British during the war. Black people also fought on the American side, hoping to gain benefits of citizenship later on.

The economic, military, and scientific superiority of the elite class justified slavery through interpretation of their status as a matter of divine providence; black people were thus perceived as members of an inferior race, as God had seemingly allowed the elite class to exploit the slave trade without any hint that he might be planning any sort of divine retribution. In fact, the very opposite had happened and slaveholders were seemingly rewarded with great material wealth. The judiciary confirmed this subordinate status even when explicitly racialized laws were not in place. A South Carolina judge editorialized in an 1832 case:

Free negroes belong to a degraded caste of society; they are in no respect on an equality with a white man. According to their condition they ought by law to be compelled to demean themselves as inferiors, from whom submission and respect to the whites, in all their intercourse in society, is demanded; I have always thought and while on the circuit ruled that words of impertinence and insolence addressed by a free negro to a white man, would justify an assault and battery.

=== Employment ===
Free black people could not enter many professional occupations, such as medicine and law, because they were barred from the necessary education. This was also true of occupations that required firearm possession, elective office, or a liquor license. Many of these careers also required large capital investments that most free black people could not afford. Exceptions to these limitations existed, as with physicians Sarah Parker Remond and Martin Delany in Louisville, Kentucky.

Free black males enjoyed wider employment opportunities than free black females, who were largely confined to domestic occupations. While free black boys could become apprentices to carpenters, coopers, barbers, and blacksmiths, girls' options were much more limited, confined to domestic work such as being cooks, cleaning women, seamstresses, and child-nurturers. Despite this, in certain areas, free black women could become prominent members of the free black community, running households and constituting a significant portion of the free black paid labor force. One of the most highly skilled professions for a woman was teaching.

=== Education ===
The 1830s saw a significant effort by white communities to oppose black people's education, coinciding with the emergence of public schooling in northern American society. Public schooling and citizenship were linked together, and because of the ambiguity that surrounded black citizenship status, blacks were effectively excluded from public access to universal education. Paradoxically, the free black community of Baltimore in the antebellum years made more significant strides in increasing black access to education than did Boston and New Haven. Most southern states had no public education systems until these were established during Reconstruction by the new biracial legislatures. Educated free black people created literary societies in the North, making libraries available to blacks in a time when books were costly but dues or subscription fees were required for membership.

Many free African American families in colonial North Carolina and Virginia became landowners and some also became slave owners. In some cases, they purchased members of their own families to protect them until they could set them free. In other cases, they participated in the full slave economy. For example, a freedman named Cyprian Ricard purchased an estate in Louisiana that included 100 slaves.

=== Civil War ===
During the Civil War, free blacks fought on both the Confederate and Union sides. Southern free black people who fought on the Confederate side were hoping to gain a greater degree of tolerance and acceptance among their white neighbors. The hope of equality through the military was realized over time, such as with the equalization of pay for black and white soldiers a month before the end of the Civil War.

== Women ==
Within free black marriages, many women were able to participate more equally in their relationships than elite white women. This potential for equality in marriage can be seen through the example of the "colored aristocracy" of the small black elite in St. Louis, where women were often economic partners in their marriages. These small groups of blacks were generally descended from French and Spanish mixed marriages. Under the French, the women in these marriages had the same rights as white women and could hold property. These black women hoped to remain financially independent both for themselves and for the sake of protecting their children from Missouri's restrictive laws. This level of black female agency also made female-centered households attractive to widows. The traditional idea of husband dominating wife could not be the central idea in these elite marriages because of women's importance in bringing income into the family. Women had to exercise caution in married relationships, however, as marrying a black man who was still a slave would make the free black woman legally responsible for his behavior, good or bad.

=== Legal cases ===
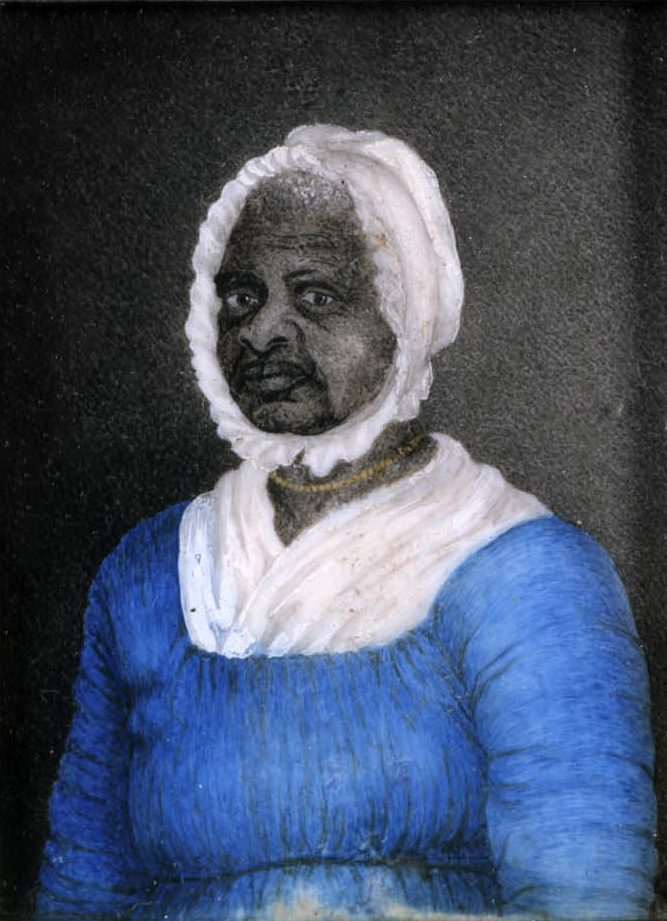
Elizabeth Freeman, one of the first slaves to file and win a freedom suit in Massachusetts.

There are multiple examples of free black women exerting agency within society, and many of these examples include exerting legal power. Slavery and freedom coexisted with an uncertainty that was dangerous for free blacks. From 1832 to 1837, the story of Margaret Morgan and her family presents a prime example of the danger to free blacks from the ambiguous legal definitions of their status. The Morgan family's legal entanglement led to the case of Prigg v. Pennsylvania, in which it was decided that their captors could supersede Pennsylvania's personal liberty law and claim ownership of the Morgans. This case highlighted the constitutional ambiguity of black rights while also illustrating the active effort by some in the white community to limit those rights.

In New England, slave women went to court to gain their freedom while free black women went to court to hold on to theirs; the New England legal system was unique in its accessibility to free blacks and the availability of attorneys. Women's freedom suits were often based on technicalities, such as the lack of legal slave documents or mixed-race ancestry that exempted some from slave service. In New England in 1716, Joan Jackson became the first slave woman to win her freedom in a New England court.

Elizabeth Freeman brought the first legal test of the constitutionality of slavery in Massachusetts after the American Revolution, asserting that the state's new constitution and its assertions of men's equality under the law meant that slavery could not exist. As a landowner and taxpayer, she is considered to be one of the most famous black women of the revolutionary era. Coverture limited the ability of some free black women to file lawsuits on their own, but a few women still filed jointly with their husbands.

== Notable free persons ==
=== Born prior to 1800 ===
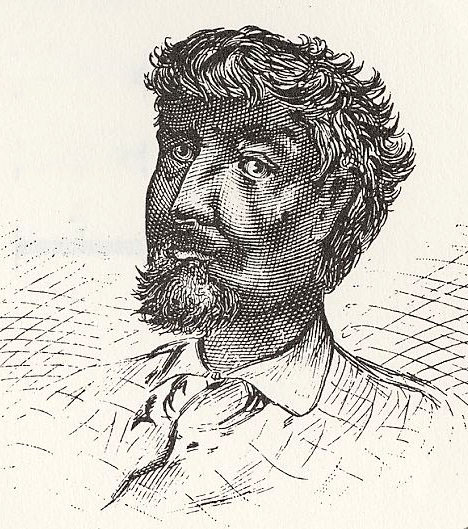
Jean Baptiste Point du Sable, the first permanent settler in 1780s Chicago and the "Father of Chicago" who traveled up the Mississippi River from New Orleans. There are no known portraits of Jean Baptiste Point du Sable made during his lifetime. This depiction is taken from A.T. Andreas' book History of Chicago (1884).

- Richard Allen: founder of African Methodist Episcopal Church, first independent black denomination in the US, co-founder of the Free African Society
- Reytory Angola: first black person to petition a legislature as an individual
- Benjamin Banneker: almanac author, astronomer, surveyor, naturalist and farmer.
- John Chavis: first African American known to attend college in the U.S.
- James Derham: first African American to formally practice medicine in the United States
- Emanuel Driggus: one of the first free First Africans in Virginia
- Henry Evans (preacher): Methodist preacher and cobbler
- Elizabeth Freeman: healer, midwife and nurse who sued for her freedom in 1781
- Prince Hall: noted abolitionist for his leadership in the free black community in Boston, and as the founder of Prince Hall Freemasonry
- Jeanette Forchet: one of the first to be freed in St. Louis, Missouri in the 1700s
- John Graweere: one of the first free First Africans in Virginia
- Thomas L. Jennings: first black man granted a U.S. patent
- Anthony Johnson (colonist): former slave who became a slave owner
- Absalom Jones: first ordained black Episcopal priest; saint
- John Berry Meachum: Baptist minister, businessman, educator
- Jane Minor, healer and emancipator
- Jean Baptiste Point du Sable: founder of Chicago and trader
- Lucy Terry: author
- Sojourner Truth: abolitionist and women's rights activist
- Denmark Vesey: led a slave revolt in 1822
- David Walker: abolitionist
- Phillis Wheatley: first published African-American female poet
- Theodore S. Wright: minister, co-founder of American Anti-Slavery Society

=== 1800–1865 ===
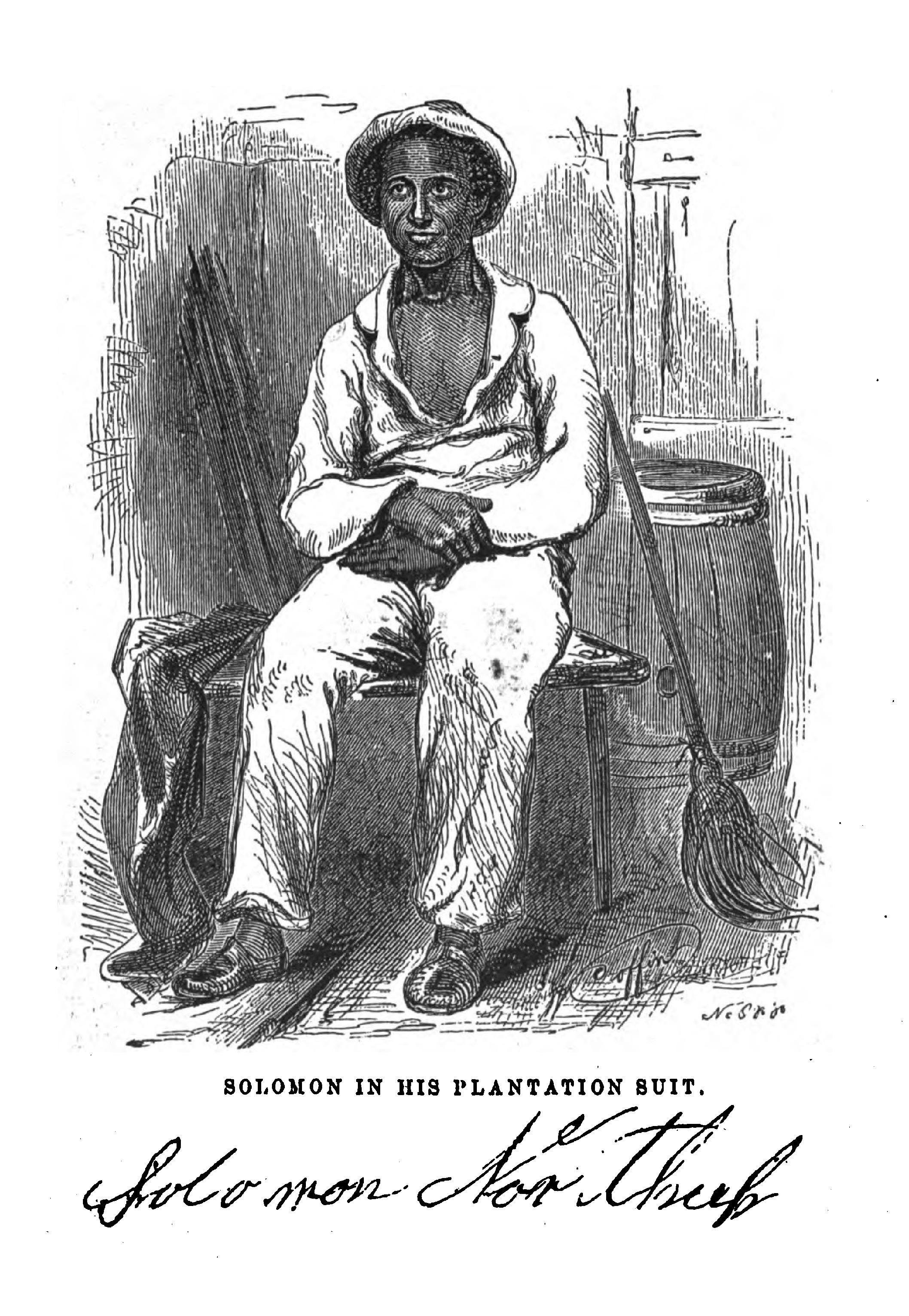
Solomon Northup was born and raised a free black man in the free state of New York and was kidnapped and sold into Southern slavery in 1841, and was later rescued and regained his freedom in 1853.

- William Wells Brown: fugitive slave, author, playwright, activist
- George Washington Chavis: member of the Mississippi Legislature
- Charlotte L. Brown: civil rights activist in 1860s San Francisco
- Thomas Day: pre-eminent antebellum cabinetmaker and abolitionist from North Carolina
- Martin Delany: abolitionist, writer, physician, and proponent of black nationalism
- Moses Dickson abolitionist, soldier, minister, organizer
- Frederick Douglass: fugitive slave, reformer, writer, and statesman
- William Ellison: property owner and businessman
- John Carruthers Stanly: One of the largest slave owners in North Carolina and the wealthiest free black resident
- Henry Highland Garnet: Abolitionist and educator
- Cynthia Hesdra: former slave and New York businesswoman
- Harriet Jacobs: writer and abolitionist
- Biddy Mason: nurse, midwife, entrepreneur, philanthropist
- Mary Meachum: Underground railroad conductor and President of Colored Ladies Soldiers Aid Society
- William Cooper Nell: journalist
- William Nesbit: civil rights activist in Pennsylvania
- Solomon Northup: writer of slave narrative Twelve Years a Slave
- Sarah Parker Remond: lecturer and abolitionist, physician
- Charles Lenox Remond
- Hiram R. Revels: republican politician, and college administrator
- Daniel Payne: educator, college administrator, and author
- Robert Purvis: abolitionist
- David Ruggles: anti-slavery activist
- Heyward Shepherd: killed in John Brown's raid on Harpers Ferry
- Michael Shiner: diarist
- Maria Stewart: journalist, abolitionist, and activist
- William Still: abolitionist, writer, and activist
- Pierre and Juliette Toussaint: philanthropists
- Harriet Tubman: fugitive slave, abolitionist, Underground Railway organizer ("conductor")
- Harriet Wilson: novelist
- Horace King: architect

== See also ==
- Antebellum black community
- Abyssinian Meeting House
- Free people of color
- Slavery in the United States
- Slavery in Canada
