= Dial (surname) =

The name itself can be of two possible origins. 1. A variant of the Scottish Dalziel, Dalzell, Dalyell that is seen spelt also as Dayell and pronounced as such /diːˈɛl/ dee-EL. The name originates from the former barony of Dalzell in Lanarkshire, in the area now occupied by Motherwell. According to the foremost authority on Scottish names Mr. Black, in his Surnames of Scotland [p. 199], claims the name is “of territorial origin from the old barony of Dlazielin Lanarkshire. The name is pronounced ‘Diyell’ or simply, ‘DL’.” or 2. an altered form of Irish Doyle, as many of the same individuals bearing the surname in the Carolina’s were called Doyill, Doyal, Doyle, Dial, Deal, and Dyal, but also all possible misinterpretations of 1. An example of this is Larkin Doyle (1772-1865), who was variously known as Larkin Dial, Deal, Dyal, Doyal and Doyle. An old Scottish rhyme about the family and the close pronunciation to that of the Devil goes like this; "Deil an Da 'yell begins wi yae letter; Deil's no Gude and Da'yell's nae better" Also Linked to the Scottish Clan Douglas, variants include: Alidiel, Daleyhel, Daleyhelle, Daliel, Daliell, Dalsell, Dalyel, Dalyell, Dalyhel, Dalyhell, Dalyiel, Dalzel, Dalzell, Dalzelle, Dalziel, Dalziell, Dayzill, Deell, Deill, Diyell, Duill, Dyell, Dyall, Dial, Deal

The Dial families in the United States are paternally descended from Benjamin Doll.

Notable people with the surname include:

- Adolph Dial (1922–1995), American politician
- Benjy Dial (1943–2001), American football player
- Buddy Dial (1937–2008), American football player
- Derrick Dial (born 1975), American basketball player
- Edwin Dial (1853-1933), American politician
- Jeff Dial (born 1976), American politician
- Joe Dial (born 1962), American pole vaulter
- Marcellas Dial (born 2000), American football player
- Nathaniel B. Dial (1862–1940), American politician
- Quinton Dial (born 1990), American football player
- Thornton Dial (1928–2016), American artist

== See also ==
- Dial D. Ryder (1938–2011), American gunsmith
- Ruth Dial Woods (1937–2023), American educator
