= Gabriel Jacobs =

Black American slave (b.c. 1650)

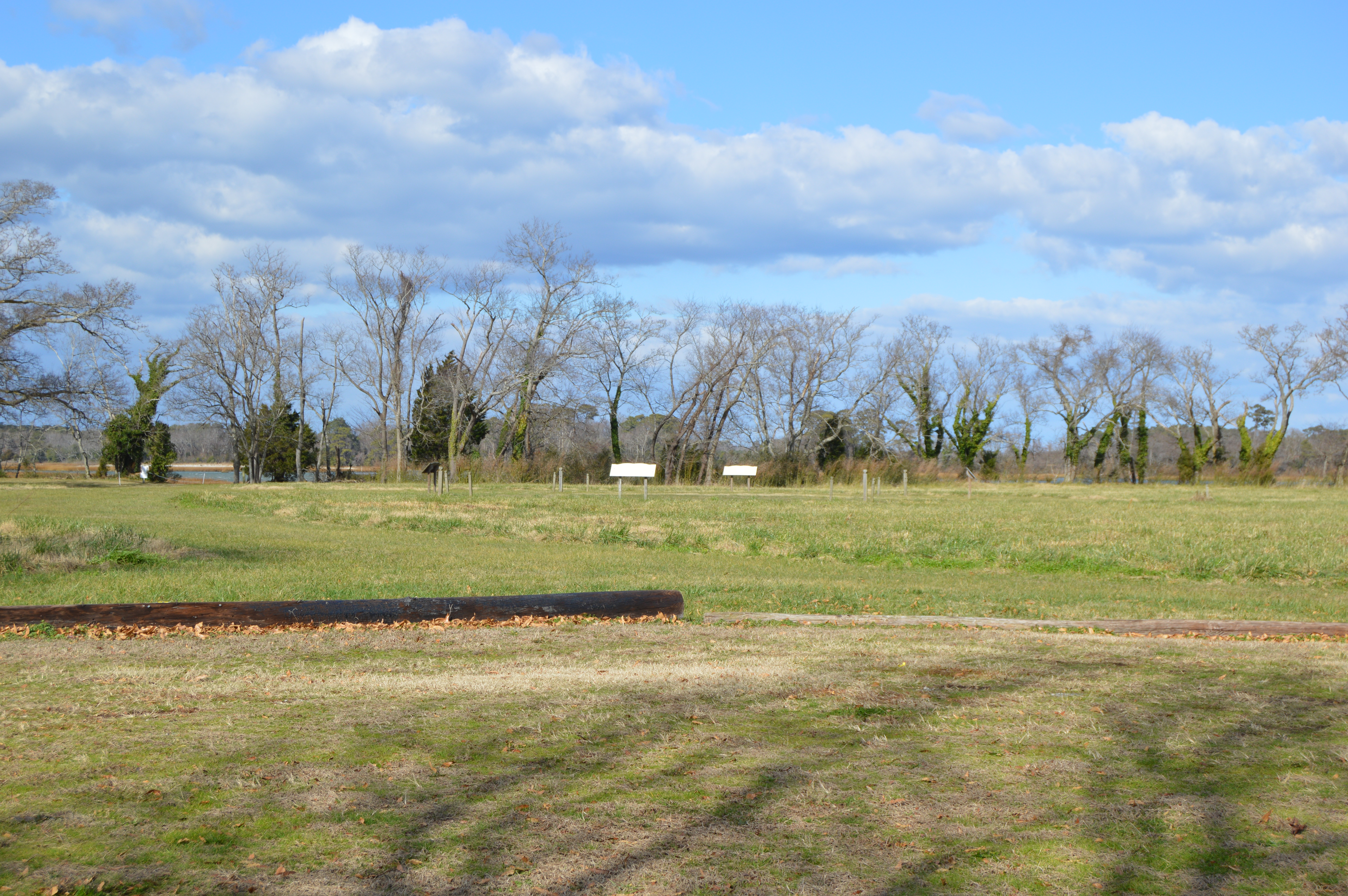
Arlington Archeological Site, Northampton County, Virginia: Gabriel Jacobs was a slave here

Gabriel Jacobs (born c. 1650) was the progenitor of the Jacobs family of free African Americans originating in Northampton County, Virginia. Several of his descendants migrated south in the mid-1700s, primarily to southeastern North Carolina. His story and that of his descendants is representative of the experiences of hundreds of other freedmen originating in early southern American colonies.

== Background ==
The context of the time in which Gabriel lived must be considered to understand the lives of Gabriel and his descendants fully. Slavery was introduced into the Colony of Virginia as early as 1619. When they arrived in Virginia, Africans joined a society that was divided between master and white servants - a society with such contempt for white servants that masters were not punished for beating them to death in 1624.

Beginning in 1662, by law, children received social status from their mother without consideration of the father. In this period, the intermingling of races was neither uncommon nor lawfully forbidden amongst indentured servants, slaves, and free people– African, Native American, or European descent.

Freedom came for some slaves through manumission (granted freedom by the owner), which usually occurred upon the owner's death. Manumission was common and was easily applied until 1723 when Virginia passed a law that required legislative approval for manumissions. Oppression of what would become known statistically as "other free" people increased steadily through the 1700s and into the early 1800s as class and color lines became more distinct through changing social norms and the passing of discriminatory laws. The Jacobs family, like many others in this group of people, began to be classified solely upon appearance as black, white, mulatto, Indian, or simply "other". On one extreme, there were attempts to enslave some who were born free, while on the other extreme lighter descendants became part of the "white" community.

== Biography ==
Jacobs is documented to be of Angolan origin. The first evidence of his approximate birth year comes from the Northampton County, Virginia, lists of tithables 1664–1667. The Virginia House of Burgesses had passed an act in 1658 declaring that all Africans and Indians over sixteen years of age were to be placed on tithable lists. Being tithable meant taxable, and slaveholders paid the taxes levied on their servants and slaves. Once free, they were tithable on their own accord and paid their taxes. In the 1670s, one-third of the taxable African Americans in Northampton County were either free, later became free, or had free children.

Gabriel and his presumed wife Bab were part of the Northampton County household of Captain John Custis as early as 1664. They were listed again in 1677, along with Fred Tucker, Daniel Webb, and Isbell Webb. John Custis was the founder of the Custis family in Virginia, and the great-grandfather of Daniel Parke Custis, first husband of Martha Dandridge Washington.

Early in the 1670s, John Custis built a three-story brick mansion named Arlington on the south bank of Old Plantation Creek in southwestern Northampton County. Gabriel Jacobs lived on Custis's 550-acre plantation until about 1700. John Custis's will, proven in 1696, split up Gabriel's family. Custis gave Gabriel to his wife Tabitha for four years to work on their "slope", which he had owned since at least 1682. Tabitha Custis was also given Gabriel Jacobs's daughter Jenny. Bab and Gabriel's son Daniel, along with 11 other slaves, were bequeathed to Custis' grandson John Custis (1678-1749), who inherited the plantation.

Gabriel's position and experience on the sloop, or even if he lived to be free, are unknown.

== Descendants ==
Many descendants of Gabriel Jacobs moved to Northeastern North Carolina after the death of his son Daniel Jacobs, a free man of color. Daniel's sister Jenny remained enslaved by the Custis family, and later had children. A descendant of Jacobs funded the Gabriel Jacobs EPOCH Initiative internship at Old Dominion University, for research into descendants of slaves of the Custis family.

=== Family tree ===
==== Generation 1 ====
Daniel Jacobs, son of Gabriel, (c. 1670–1733), was freed between 1702 and 1704. It appears that he had been transferred to Thomas Harmonson Sr, whose will stipulated Daniel's freedom upon the death of his wife. A condition to his freedom was paying 200 pounds of tobacco annually to someone Harmonson's wife Elizabeth would assign payment to or Harmonson's son-in-law William Waterson.

Daniel was called "Daniell Jacob Negro" in July 1709 when he agreed to pay Jean Grimes's fine for bastard bearing. He was a Northampton County taxable in his household from 1720 to 1723 and was a "negro" taxable head of a household from 1724 to 1731 with his wife Elizabeth and children.

Daniel's children are considered to be Isaac, Abigail, Frances and Elizabeth. He died in 1733.

==== Generation 2 ====
Abigail Jacobs, daughter of Daniel, born about 1708, was presented for bastard bearing in Northampton County, Virginia, on May 11, 1731. Her father, Daniel Jacob, paid her fine. Her sister Frances married Daniel Webb, grandson of Daniel Webb "Negro" (estate of John Custis of Arlington) and Ann Williams, a white indentured servant. Some of Abigail's children were counted as "white" on tax rolls beginning in 1762. Some children of her brother Isaac were also counted as "white". Thus, some of the families became multiracial nearly three hundred years ago. In the 1700s, some families began to identify as white, some as black. Abigail's children were Primus, John, Matthew, Esther, Abigail, and Zachariah.

==== Generation 3 ====
Zachariah Jacobs, son of Abigail, born about 1736, was taxable on a white male tithe and 2 Negro tithes in New Hanover County, North Carolina, in 1762. He was listed as a "Black" taxable in Brunswick County, North Carolina in 1772 and granted land on Buckhead Swamp in the same county in 1784.

Zachariah is the father of Peter, William, Josiah, and Ezekiah. All four sons served North Carolina during the American Revolution. They were among over 400 freeborn African-Americans from North Carolina who served as Patriots.

==== Generation 4 ====
Ezekiah Jacobs, son of Zachariah, born about 1760, enlisted as a private for one year in Mill's Company of the 10th North Carolina Regiment on December 18, 1781. He was head of a Brunswick County, North Carolina household of 4 "other free" in 1800, and 8 in 1810.

Ezekiah recorded a discharge certificate from his service as a soldier in the North Carolina Line on February 18, 1788, in New Hanover County. 675 acres of Brunswick County land was recorded in his name between 1800 and 1820.

There is currently no formal evidence of the descendants of Ezekiah. One theory suggests he married Prudence and is the father of Noah, born September 13, 1803, in Brunswick County, in the portion that became part of Columbus County upon its formation in 1808. However, there are DNA tests that do not confirm this theory. Additionally, there is no consensus among genealogists, but this is not the most commonly accepted parentage theory.

==== Generation 5 ====
Noah Jacobs, possible son of Ezekiah, (1803 - <1880) a cooper and cotton farmer, was born in Brunswick County, North Carolina. He married Keziah Long, daughter of Gabriel Long about 1835. He was listed as "white" in all existing census records during his lifetime. Noah and Keziah had 13 children: Caroline, Anna Jane, John Wilson, Gabriel K, Mary Elizabeth, George Washington, Noah Edwards, Dorcas Adaline, Susan E, Rebecca Ellen, Benjamin Franklin, Prudence L., and Daniel Pinkney. All of his progeny have been considered "white."

Noah's wife Keziah received a gift of 100 acres of land from her father Gabriel in 1835, likely a wedding present. Noah petitioned for a land grant of 100 acres in Columbus County "adjoining his own line" and that of Washington Long in 1846. This land was next to that his wife Keziah had received in 1835 from her father and near Gabriel Long's property.

On June 5, 1846, he sold 10 acres on Town Creek "adjoining McKay now Berry, on the second Branch below Meadow House Branch" to Jane Cumbo and her heirs of Brunswick County, North Carolina. This 10 acres was likely inherited from his father Ezekiah. Cumbo was a fairly common name among enslaved people in Virginia and subsequently among Cumbo freedmen beginning as early as the mid-1600s. Jane was likely descended from the early Virginia Cumbo family and may have been a relative of Noah Jacobs.

As part of the "free Negro Code," an 1840 North Carolina statute provided 'that if any free negro, mulatto, or free person of color, shall wear or carry about his or her person, or keep in his or her house, any shot gun, musket, rifle, pistol, sword, dagger or bowie-knife, unless he or she shall have obtained a license therefor from the Court of Pleas and Quarter Sessions of his or her county...." In other words, any "other free" persons needed to obtain a license to own a gun. Documents from Columbus County records contain Noah Jacobs' attestations to the need for other Jacobs men living near him to own a firearm for hunting purposes. These Jacobs were possibly "black" relatives with the same common ancestor – Gabriel Jacobs of colonial Virginia. In 20 years, the American Civil War would begin, and the final split between the white and black sides of the family would be complete.

== See also ==
- Angela (enslaved woman)
- Anthony Johnson
- Emanuel Driggus
- John Graweere
- Margaret Cornish
- Free Black people
- Free people of color
