= Jeanette Forchet =

Free African-American (c. 1736 – 1803)

Jeanette Forchet, or Fourchet (also referred to as Flore, Jeannette Flore, and Susan Jeannette) was one of few free African-Americans in what would become St. Louis, Missouri in the 18th-century. A 1796 census only listed forty-one free blacks living in St. Louis other than Forchet. Forchet was born around 1736, most likely in Illinois country. She ended up as a slave at a French outpost in Cahokia, Illinois. In 1763, the Catholic priest there felt his output falling into Protestant hands and freed all of his slaves. With nowhere to go, many of the slaves wandered around the area and eventually settled in newly founded St. Louis. Forchet was one of these freed slaves.

== Biography ==
Pierre Laclede gave her a town lot in St. Louis, Missouri in 1765. This made her one of the first lot owners in St. Louis and matriarch of one of the most prominent African-America families in the city. On her lot, Forchet built a twenty-five by twenty foot house, where she raised her family. The house was on Rue de L'eglise, later known as Second Street. Jeanette was married to Gregory, a free blacksmith, who died in 1770. After his death, Jeannette was left with a farm plot, two sons, and two daughters. The family supported themselves by growing corn and raising livestock, including cows, pigs, and chickens. Forchet also had a home laundry business to supplement their income.

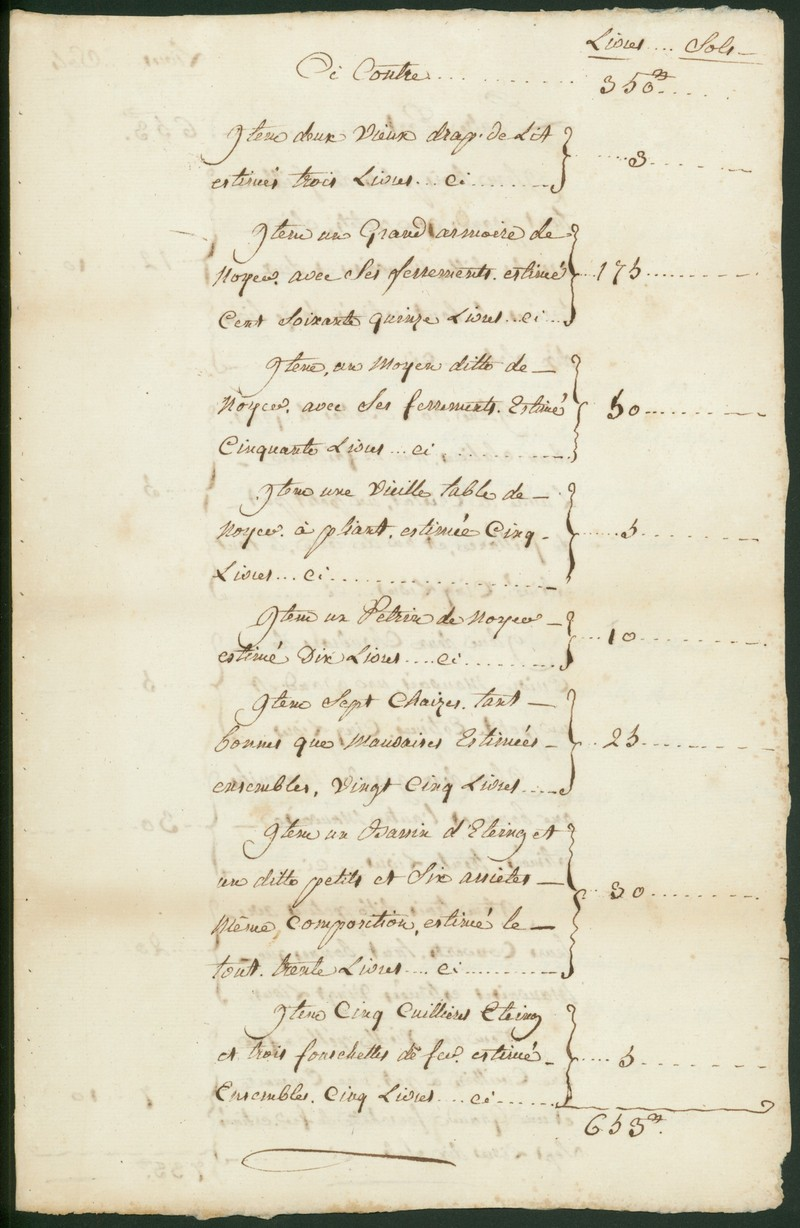
Inventory and appraisal of property belonging to Jeanette Forchet, a free negress, May 30, 1790

In 1773, Forchet married Pierre Ignac, a free black gunsmith who was known as Valentin. The two signed a prenuptial agreement, as was customary at the time and in keeping with French custom. Forchet prepared an inventory of all of her property, which included real estate, animals, household goods, and two copper candlesticks. Her property totaled 1,349 livres and her husbands totaled 1,220 livres. The family grew crops on their farm, including wheat, tobacco, and corn. Valentin worked as a trapper, gunsmith, and helped with the farming. In 1788, Spanish authorities gave Valentin permission to hunt in the territory of the Grand Osage Indians southwest of St. Louis. Valentin did not return from his trip, having died in 1789. Jeanette did not learn of his death until 1790. She was a widow a second time, at age fifty-four. During their marriage, the couple increased the value of their assets to 3,763 livres. Jeanette and Valentin had no children together.

== Death ==
Jeanette died in 1803. After her death, her descendants subdivided her land among themselves and it was later sold to developers. This would have amounted to eight arpents of land, according to a 1793 survey. Forchet was survived by a daughter, Susanne; a son, Augustin; and a grandson, Jean Baptiste Marly. Two of Jeanette's children died before she did, including the mother of Jean Baptiste. Augustin died not longer after his mother. Jean Baptiste never married and dabbled in real estate. Susanne later married a well to do Frenchman named Jean Baptist Irbour. They had a daughter, Julie. In 1850, Julie, married Antoine Labbadie, who was considered one of St. Louis's wealthiest black men. Their family became one of the city's largest and most prominent black families.

Forchet was one of a small number of free blacks in colonial St. Louis. She retained her personal freedom and had many rights that were denied to slaves. Under French and Spanish law, she could own property, marry, and enter into contracts. However, she still had to obey social and legal restrictions in place at the time. She had to have permission to leave St. Louis and she never earned the title of Veuve Forchet, an honorific title for widows in colonial St. Louis.
