= Edwin Dial =

Mississippi politician

Edwin H. Dial

Mayor of Meridian, Mississippi
- In office July 1, 1893 – July 1, 1901
- Preceded by: Thomas H. Griffin
- Succeeded by: Enoch Ephraim Spinks

Personal details
- Born: Edwin Hamilton Dial; May 7, 1853 Alabama, U.S.
- Died: December 30, 1933 (aged 80) Meridian, Mississippi, U.S.
- Party: Democratic
- Spouse: Annie Thompson (m. 1880)
- Children: 3
- Education: University of Mississippi School of Law

Edwin H. Dial (1853–1933) served as mayor of Meridian, Mississippi from 1893 to 1901, during a period of significant growth and modernization.

== Background ==
Dial was born in Alabama to Joseph R. and Emily Ann Elizabeth (Woodward) Dial. In the 1860s, the family moved to Mississippi.

== Political career ==
Dial was elected mayor of Meridian in 1893. During his eight years in office, major infrastructure improvements were made to the city. This included installing telephone lines, paving roads, and building sidewalks. Construction of both the original Union Station and the historic Grand Opera House were built during his tenure as well.

Dial is also attributed with coining the city's nickname, "The Queen City."

== Legacy ==
A marker was unveiled at the mayor's former residence on the corner of 30th Avenue and 10th Street in June 2009.

== Death ==
He's buried at the Rose Hill Cemetery in Meridian.
