= Angela (enslaved woman) =

Enslaved woman in the Colony of Virginia

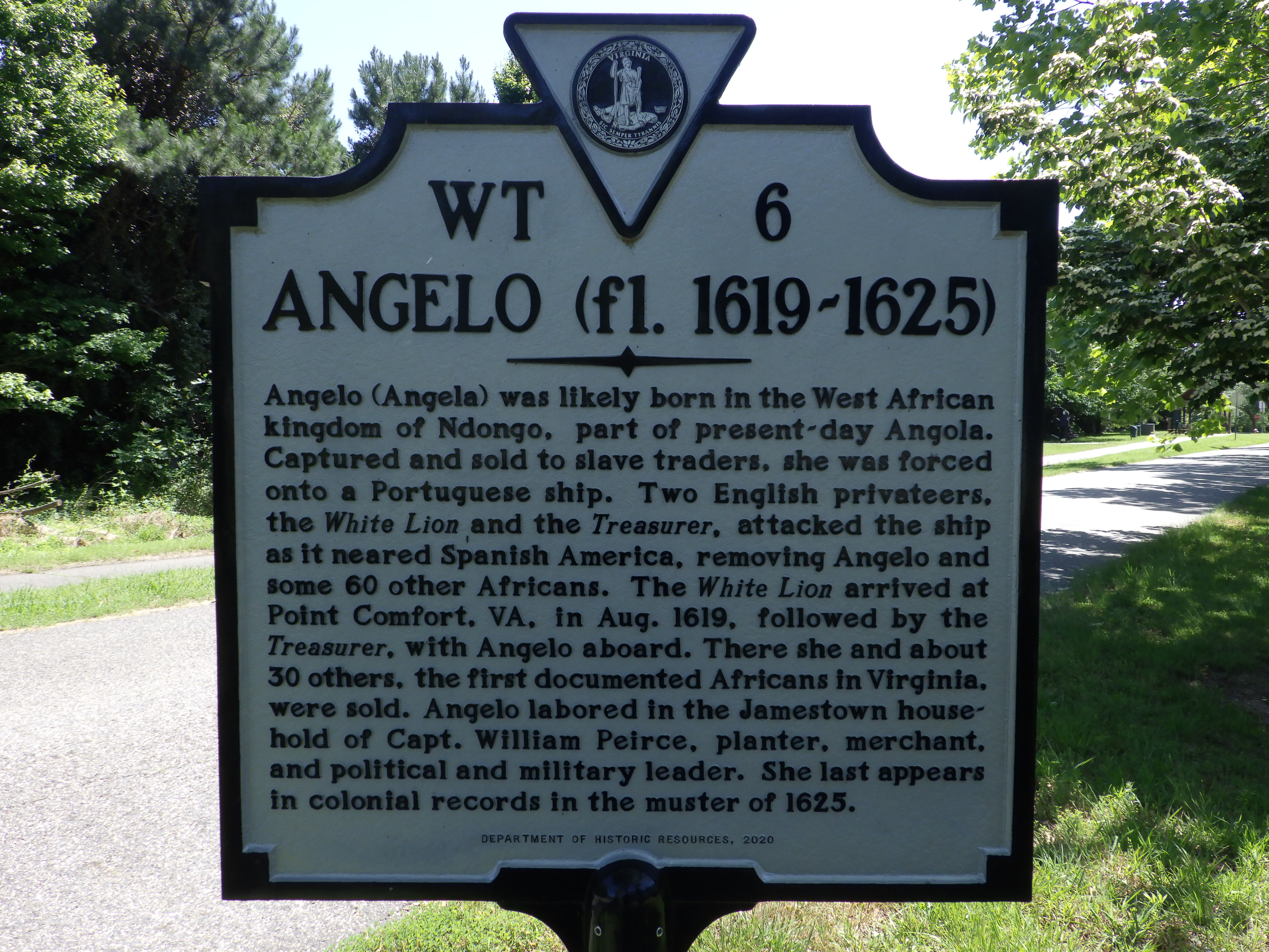
"Angelo" historical marker near Jamestown Settlement

Angela (fl. 1619–1625), also Angelo, was one of the first enslaved Africans to be officially recorded in the Colony of Virginia in 1619.

== Early life and enslavement ==
Angela's early life is little known, and her date of birth is unknown. Still, she was likely born in present-day Angola, in what was then the Kimbundu-speaking area of the Kingdom of Ndongo. She likely had a rural upbringing. In 1619, she was part of a group of 350 enslaved Africans who were sold to Manuel Mendes da Cunha, captain of the São João Bautista. This ship was destined for Vera Cruz, and the people who were its "cargo" were to be sold to plantations in the Caribbean and beyond.

During its journey across the Atlantic, the São João Bautista was attacked by the Treasurer and White Lion. Those ships carried a letter of marque, which permitted them to attack Portuguese vessels. These ships stole many enslaved Angolans, perhaps 45–50, and changed course to Virginia. The ships landed at Point Comfort in late August 1619. The first to arrive was the White Lion, with twenty enslaved people sold there in exchange for food. Three or four days later, the Treasurer arrived with a second group of enslaved people; some were put ashore before the ship fled, fearing arrest. Of those put ashore, one of them was likely Angela. A Captain Willian Peirce purchased her. These two groups of enslaved people have become known in historical and commemorative discourse as the 'First Africans'.

== Life in Virginia ==
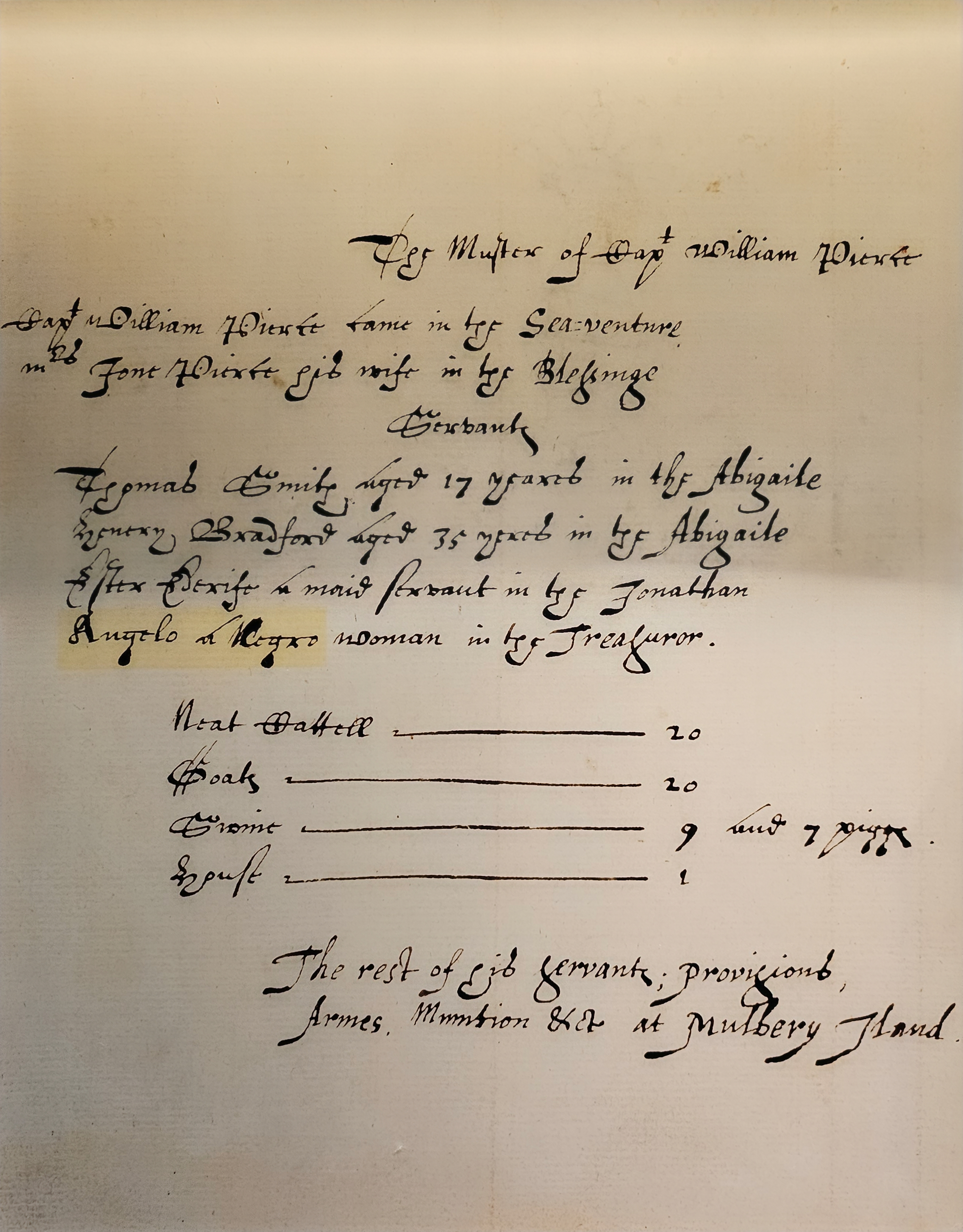
Muster of William Peirce, with "Angelo" highlighted

After William Peirce [sic] purchased her, Angela worked for his household. In 1622, local indigenous people attacked the colony and killed 347 of the inhabitants; Angela survived. The attack was followed by a period of famine, which Angela also survived. In 1625, she was listed in the Virginia Colony muster as one of four servants enslaved by the Peirces and the only Black person. After 1625, Angela no longer appears in the historical record. Her date of death is unknown.

== Archaeological investigation ==
The first archaeological investigation into parts of what has become known in the twenty-first century as 'The Angela Site' was undertaken by the Civilian Conservation Corps in the 1930s, many of whom were African American laborers. Between 2017 and 2019 archaeologists at Historic Jamestown investigated the site where Peirce's property lay, to reveal more about the kind of life that Angela and other early inhabitants may have lived. Four cowrie shells were excavated as part of the site assemblage and have been cautiously interpreted as connected to Angela.

== Legacy ==
On 18 August 2019, the 400th anniversary of the arrival of Angela and other enslaved people to America was commemorated in Jamestown. Attendees included over two hundred people, including local and national members of the National Association for the Advancement of Colored People, as well as people from the Ghanaian community. To some members of the African American community, Angela, as a part of the group of 'First Africans', is an important aspect of their historical identity. At Historic Jamestown, a costumed interpreter performs Angela's story for visitors. A new play was commissioned by the Jamestown Settlement, which also tells Angela's story. One of the cowrie shells excavated in 2019 is on display in the Archaearium at Historic Jamestowne. A memorial to Angela was unveiled at Fort Monroe.
