= Treasurer (privateer) =

Sailing ship in 1610s Virginia

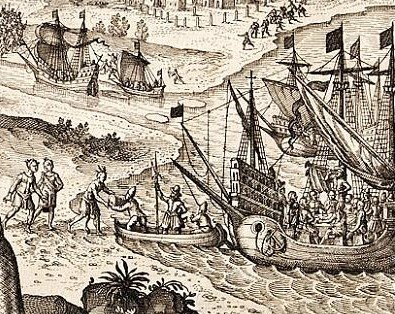
- 1618 The Abduction of Pocahontas, depicting ship Treasurer and Captain Samuel Argall
- Name: Treasurer
- Owner: Samuel Argall; Robert Rich, 2nd Earl of Warwick; Thomas West, 3rd Baron De La Warr
- Port of registry: Vlissingen, Netherlands
- Nickname(s): Treasorer [sic], Trier [sic], Treasorour [sic]
- Fate: Sunk in Bermuda

General characteristics
- Class & type: Man-of-war or Frigate
- Tons burthen: 130 tons
- Complement: 60
- Armament: 14 guns

Treasurer was a sailing ship operating in the Atlantic Ocean in the early 1600s. Captained by Samuel Argall and then Daniel Elfrith, it is notable for its dealings with the Colony of Virginia, notably encounters with Pocahontas, and (along with the White Lion) delivering the first Africans to Virginia and to Bermuda.

== Early history (1610s) ==
Co-owned by Robert Rich, 2nd Earl of Warwick, Thomas West, 3rd Baron De La Warr, and Samuel Argall, Treasurer was described as an "English man of war". Intended as an attack vessel for plundering non-English ships in and around the Spanish Main and Caribbean, the ship used Flushing, Netherlands, as a base of privateering.

In records, Treasurer was commissioned by the Virginia Company of London to transport English colonists, protect settlements, and provide relief for settlements in the 1610s. At least 17 surviving colonists claimed in the Muster of 1625 (N.S.) to have traveled on Treasurer to Virginia between 1613 and 1618. It is surmised that at least 60 settlers traveled to Virginia in 1613.

== Trading and Pocahontas' capture (1612-1613) ==
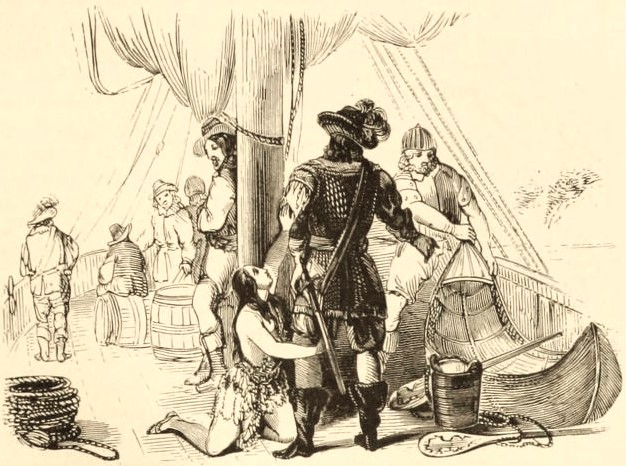
Depiction of Pocahontas and Samuel Argall

In July, 1612, Samuel Argall took command of the Treasurer in England. Argall reached Virginia in September, after a 57-day direct route west--the fastest Transatlantic crossing recorded in the 1610s.

In March, 1613 (N.S.), Argall sailed Treasurer up the Rappahannock River to explore, then up the Potomac River. He was informed by natives that "Pokerhuntas" was with the Patawomeck people at Passapatanzy, Virginia.

At a village led by Japazaws (Iapassus), Argall invited a few of the Patawomeck leadership and Pocahontas to tour the ship and to spend the night aboard. The next morning, Argall absconded with Pocahontas to deliver her to the English at Jamestown.

Some time before May, 1613, Samuel Argall manned a different ship (a frigate) to explore the Chesapeake and Eastern Shore. Treasurer was left with an unnamed master at Old Point Comfort, to be overhauled for a long-term "fishing voyage".

== Raiding French settlements (1613) ==
Samuel Argall returned from Chesapeake exploration in May, 1613, to retake command of the Treasurer. This planned "fishing voyage" was actually a military action--Argall had instructions to stamp out French Jesuit colonization in "North Virginia" (present-day Maine). Aboard the Treasurer, Argall sacked French Acadian settlements of Saint-Saveur (on Mount Desert Island), Saint Croix Island, and Port-Royal. The raids lasted until November, 1613.

== Transporting the Rolfes to England (1616) ==
Treasurer—the same vessel that captured Pocahontas and led her to become "Rebecca Rolfe"—transported Rebecca, husband John Rolfe, son Thomas Rolfe, Sir Thomas Dale, and a native entourage to London to promote the Virginia Company's progress in the New World.

== Captain Elfrith, the Neptune, and the White Lion (1618-1619) ==
In 1618, Samuel Argall had a private commission with the Treasurer with a letter of marque from Charles Emmanuel I, Duke of Savoy. He was commissioned to plunder the West Indies.

In March, 1618, Samuel Argall commanded Neptune out of London, by a charter from the Virginia Company, with Thomas West, 3rd Baron De La Warr as a passenger. Treasurer then captained by Daniel Elfrith, met up with Neptune in the Azores and traded passengers. Treasurer stopped in Bermuda, while the Neptune had a difficult journey Virginia. Lord De La Warr became ill and died on the Neptune. An investigation occurred in 1622 to discover the relationship of Neptune and Treasurer, and where Thomas West was interred, no definitive conclusions occurred.

In 1618, a faction of the Virginia Company of London desired to recall then acting-governor Samuel Argall to initiate an investigation of "privateering history" (acts of piracy) with the Treasurer.

In 1619, a refitted Treasurer was captained by Daniel Elfrith and piloted by a "Master Gray". In its travels around the Caribbean, Elfrith met up with the 160-ton White Lion (privateer) captained by a Calvinist minister John Colyn Jope. Jope took command and, using a letter of marque from the Prince of Orange, attacked Portuguese fluyt São João Batista [sic] (sometimes written in Spanish form, San Juan Bautista), captained by Manuel Mendes da Cunha. Elfrith still bore Argall's letter of marque from Duke of Savoy, a duchy which had recently made peace with the Spanish Empire and was united with Portugal. Near the Bay of Campeche, the crew of the White Lion and Treasurer plundered the Portuguese cargo: grain, tallow, and about 60 Angolans.

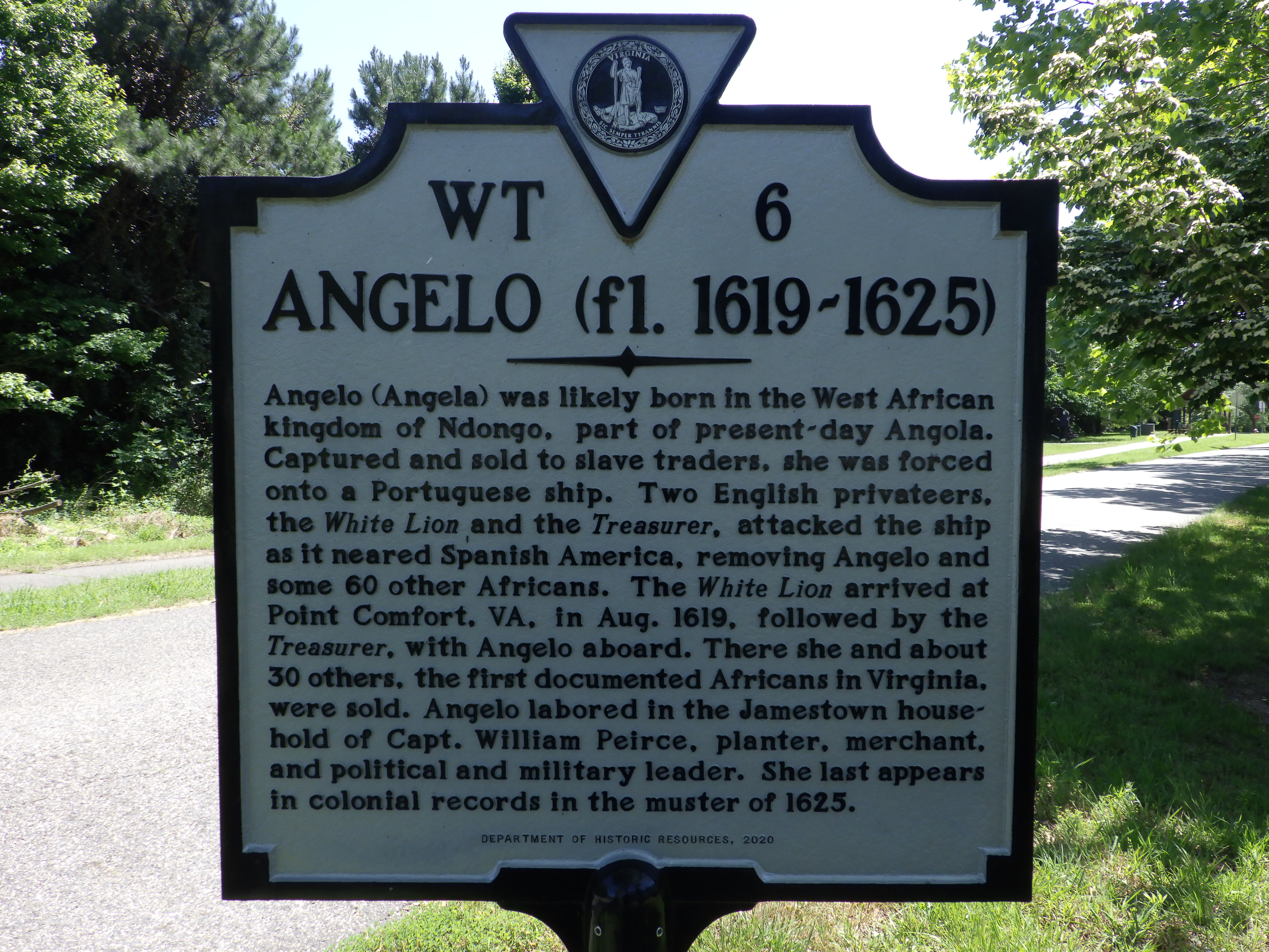
"Angelo" historical marker

In August, 1619, with cargo split between them both ships sailed for Virginia, but were separated along the voyage. Treasurer arrived a few days after the White Lion, The latter ship sold between 20-30 Angolan slaves to the James River plantations near Jamestown. Treasurer arrived at Old Point Comfort, badly needing resupply. Elfrith's privateering letter of marque was scrutinized by the inhabitants, alleging illegal piracy, thus the Angolans were considered "illicit goods". Treasurer absconded to Bermuda.

== Final stop in Bermuda (1619-1620) ==
About 28 Angolans arrived in Bermuda, of which only one was later named: "Angela". The Angolans were unloaded and given to work on land owned by the Earl of Warwick. These were the first Africans in Bermuda. In 1620, governor Nathaniel Butler wrote to Nathaniel Rich: "...these slaves are the most proper and cheap instruments for this plantation that can be".

The Treasurer was described as "extremely poore [sic] [condition], having all her upper works so rotten as she was utterly unable [to go to sea again]".

According to records, Angela and up to six other Angolans were re-boarded on the Treasurer to depart for Virginia in February 1620. Either the Treasurer sunk off a creek in the James River, or it was as intentionally sunk near St. George's Harbour, Bermuda.

== See also ==
- Jamestown supply missions
- First Africans in Virginia
- Slavery in Bermuda
- White Lion (privateer)
- Mary and John
