= First Africans in Virginia =

1619 arrival of the first slaves in the North American British colonies

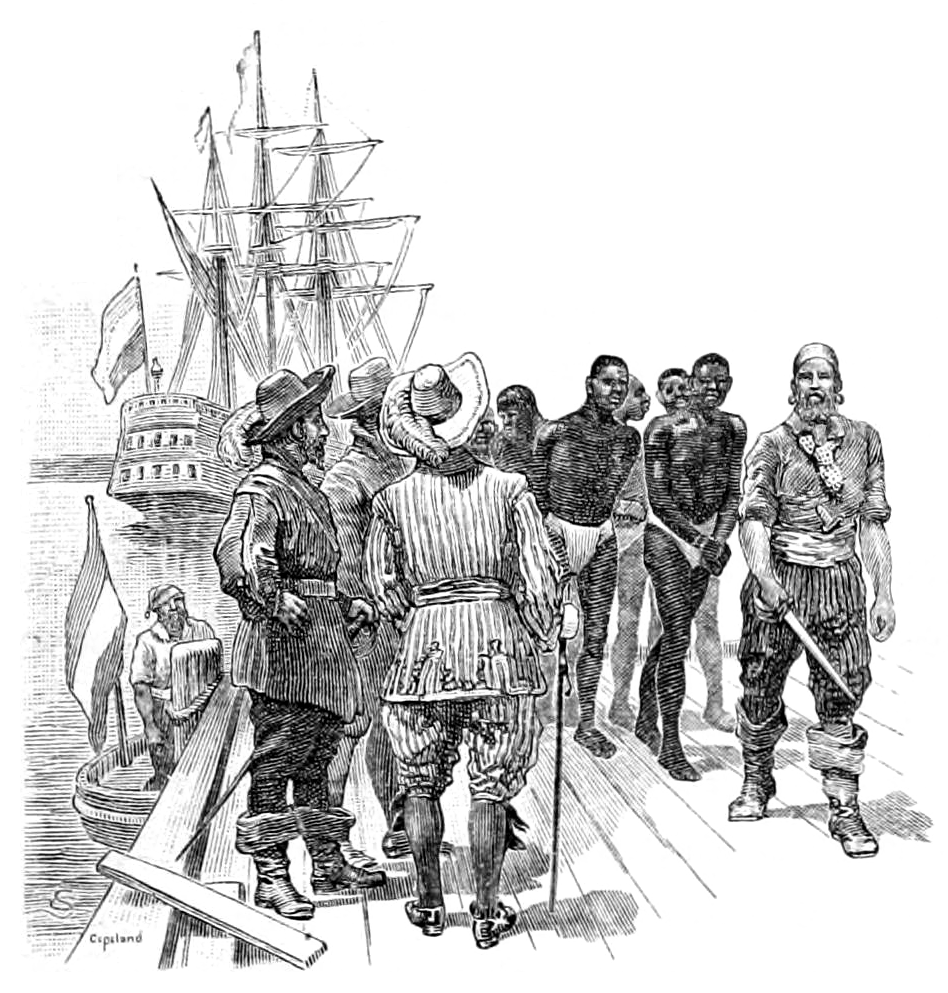
1910 depiction of the first Black slaves brought to the Colony of Virginia

The first Africans in Virginia were a group of "twenty and odd" captive persons, from the Mbundu ethnic group in modern-day Angola, who landed in the Colony of Virginia at Old Point Comfort in Hampton, Virginia in late August 1619 after their 11-week journey. Their arrival is seen as a beginning of the history of slavery in Virginia and British colonies in North America, although they were not in chattel slavery as it would develop in the United States, but were sold as indentured servants and had mostly worked off their indentures and were free by 1630. These colonies would go on to secede and become the United States in 1776. The landing of these captive Africans is also seen as a starting point for African American history, given that they were the first such group in mainland English America.

They were sold to the governor of Virginia by Captain John Colyn Jope, the commander of the White Lion, who attacked and plundered them from the slave ship São João Baptista, which was carrying over three hundred Mbundu people, from the Kingdom of Ndongo, on route to New Spain (modern-day Mexico). Upon arrival, they were sold as indentured servants. Recognition of this event has been promoted since 1994 by Calvin Pearson and "Project 1619 Inc", an organization he founded in 2007, whose work led the Virginia Department of Historic Resources to install a historic marker commemorating this event at Old Point Comfort in 2007 and the designation of this area as the Fort Monroe National Monument in 2011.

Several commemorations of this event took place on its 400th anniversary in August 2019, including the starting of The 1619 Project (not associated with Project 1619, Inc.) with a publication by Nikole Hannah-Jones commemorating this event and the Year of Return, Ghana 2019 to encourage the African diaspora to settle in and invest in Africa.

== Transit from Port of Luanda to Veracruz ==
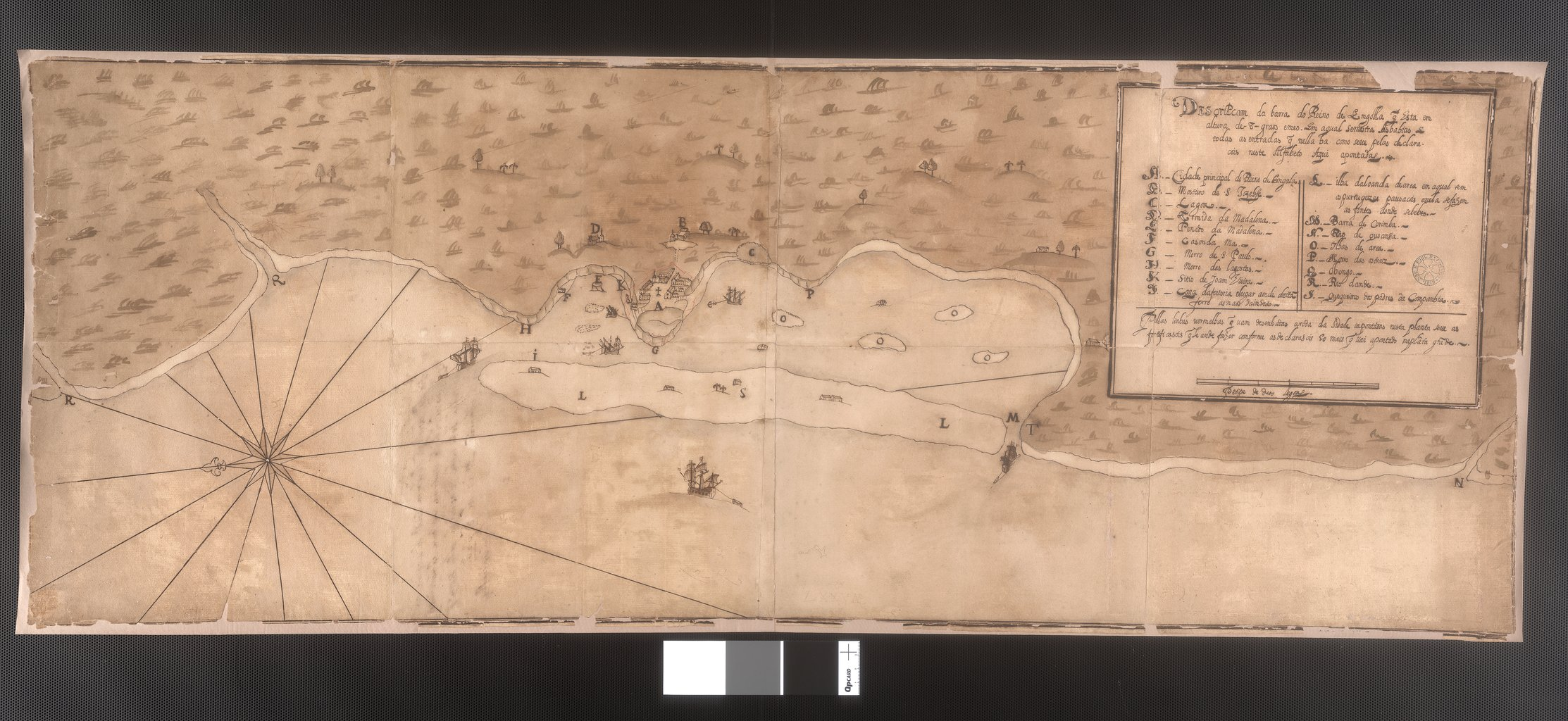
Port of Luanda, 1626.

During the Atlantic slave trade, starting in the 16th century, Portuguese slave traders brought large numbers of African people across the Atlantic to work in their colonies in the Americas, such as Brazil. An estimated 4.9 million people from Africa were brought to Brazil during the period from 1501 to 1866. Thousands of Mbundu people were captured by Portuguese slave traders and their African allies such as the Imbangala, in invasions of the Kingdom of Ndongo (part of modern Angola) under Governor Luís Mendes de Vasconcellos. These captives were taken to port and often sent to other parts of the Spanish and Portuguese Empires, which were brought together in that time by the Iberian Union. Thus, those taken captive from Angola and brought to Virginia in 1619 would have belonged to the Mbundu ethnic group, an interpretation used at the Jamestown Settlement Galleries.

In 1619, the Portuguese fluyt San Juan Bautista took a large group through the Middle Passage from the Port of Luanda in Angola to the bay of Veracruz in Mexico. Of the 350 total on the slave ship, about 143 died in the voyage, and 24 children were sold during a stop at the Colony of Santiago in Jamaica, with 123 enslaved people eventually being taken to Veracruz, in addition to the smaller group of 20-30 taken by the privateers, or perhaps double that amount.

== Attack by English privateers ==
Near Veracruz in the Bay of Campeche, the English privateers White Lion and Treasurer, operating under Dutch and Savoyard letters of marque and sponsored by the Earl of Warwick and Samuel Argall, attacked the San Juan Bautista, and each took 20-30 of the African captives to Old Point Comfort on Hampton Roads at the tip of the Virginia Peninsula, the first time such a group was brought to mainland English America. Of those aboard the Treasurer, only a few were sold in Virginia, the majority being taken shortly thereafter to Nathaniel Butler in Bermuda. English privateers had been sailing under Dutch and other flags since the 1604 Treaty of London concluded the Anglo-Spanish War.

The primary source document for the White Lion's arrival is as follows:

About the latter end of August, a Dutch man of Warr of the burden of a 160 tunes arriued at Point-Comfort, the Comandor name Capt Jope, his Pilott for the West Indies one Mr Marmaduke an Englishman. They mett wth the Trer in the West Indyes, and determyned to hold consort shipp hetherward, but in their passage lost one the other. He brought not any thing but 20. and odd Negroes, wth the Governor and Cape Marchant bought for vietualle (whereof he was in greate need as he p'tended) at the best and easyest rate they could. He hadd a largge and ample Comyssion from his Excellency to range and to take purchase in the West Indyes.

— Records of the Virginia Company (1619)

One of the enslaved women from the Treasurer was called Angela, who was purchased by Captain William Peirce. She is the earliest historically attested enslaved African in the colony.

== Colony of Virginia ==
The First Africans were initially owned by several colonists, including George Yeardley, William Tucker, Abraham Piersey, Francis West, and Edward Bennett. In 1628, one hundred additional Africans were brought to the colony.

=== Biographical summaries ===
A 1620 census showed thirty-two Africans were present in the colony. Initially, they remained in the same place for long periods of time. Several of them were moved around the colony when Yeardley and Piersey died.

==== Michael and Katherine Blizzard ====
The Blizzards were slaves of Captain William Ewens, and lived on the south side of the James River. They were married before 1639. Author K.I. Knight suggests they adopted their surname after surviving a blizzard in 1667. They had five children, and their descendants live in present-day Surry County, Virginia.

==== Anthony (Tony) Longo ====
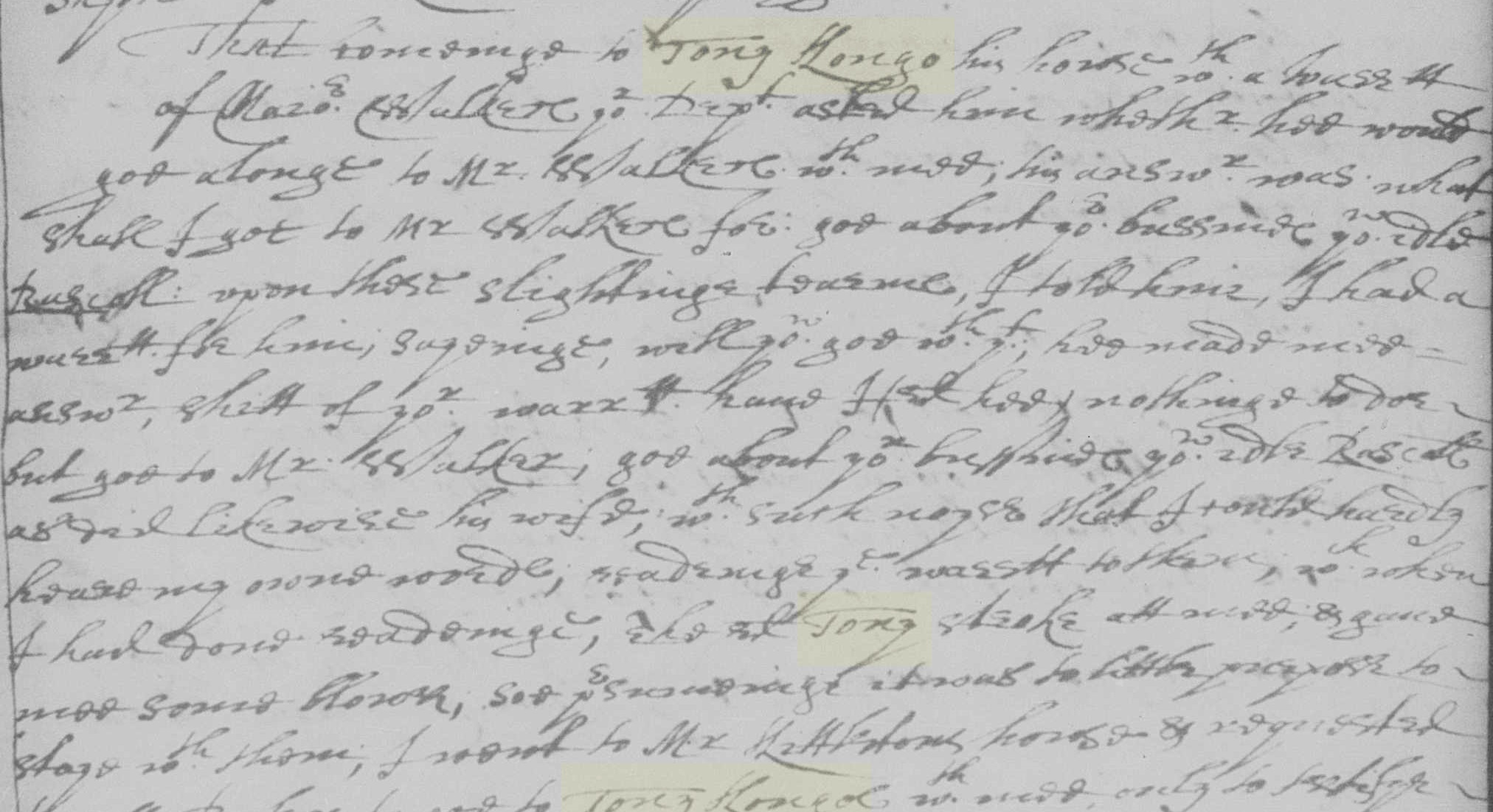
Except regarding Tony Longo, wherein he refers to the court official as an "idle rascal". Longo's name is highlighted.

Author Tim Hashaw suggests Anthony's surname, Longo, originates either from the Kingdom of Loango, or the surname Congo. Anthony (Portuguese: Antonio) Longo entered the ownership of Abraham Piersey in 1619. By 1635, he was free, seven years after Piersey's final will and testament was written. In 1653, he married Hannah, an Englishwoman, and they had three children in total. They acquired headrights for 250 acres of land, but Longo did not cultivate it, instead assigning it to a white planter in 1658. He worked as a tenant farmer afterwards.

After the fall of tobacco prices and the death of his wife in 1669, Longo was forced to apply to the magistrate for relief, and his children were hired out as indentured servants as a result. He was able to keep custody of his eldest daughter, Grace, by overturning a ruling in court. Anthony Longo died in 1670. John had been indentured to Edmund Scarborough, but his heirs released him halfway through his term.

John Longo later became a farmer, carpenter, and raised livestock. John's common-law marriage to an Englishwoman was challenged by the court, and she was charged for bastardy due to having a child with him. He later adopted a mulatto girl named Sarah born out of wedlock between a slave and an English maidservant, promising to pay the mother's fine for fornication and to be daughter's godparent. Grace Longo was living in Northampton County, Virginia with John Francisco during the 1660s. The free African-American Longo family was noted to decline after John's death, as Americans became more conscious of race.

==== John Francisco ====
Hashaw states John Francisco was of Angolan descent, and had a Latin Christian name before leaving Africa. John was listed on the Flowerdew Hundred Plantation from 1621 to 1628, and was moved to Samuel Mathews's plantation later on. At some point, he married a free Black woman named Arisbian. In 1668, he attained guardianship over the son of Thomas Driggus, an enslaved man. In 1672, another free Black man testified on his behalf, against a white planter who claimed he had not gone through with a cattle trade he had previously promised..

==== Anthony (Toney) King ====
Listed on Abraham Piersey's plantation in 1621, until his death in 1628. Recorded in the 1660s paying tithes and living on Northampton County. His daughter Sarah King married Thomas Johnson, the son of Mary and Anthony Johnson.

==== Benjamin Doll ====
Benjamin Doll (fl. 1620–1660) was an enslaved man, landowner, and the progenitor of the American Dial family. While enslaved, Doll acquired funds via animal husbandry, raising cattle, horses, chicken, and goats. He was later able to pay for the passage of six English indentured servants to the colony. This allowed him to acquire headrights for 300 acres of land in Surry County. He was noted to be literate in English, and represented a white woman as an attorney in 1659. (Note: Author Sheryll Cashin suggests he arrived to the colony already literate in Portuguese.)

Doll married a Black woman and had a son, John, who acquired 200 acres of land in Isle of Wight County. John also married a Black woman, who had the Portuguese-origin name Isabell. Their descendants emigrated from Tidewater Virginia with other free African-American families, taking on surnames such as Dial, Dyal, and Deal. Some moved to North Carolina, where they were termed Brass Ankles and Lumbee. The Dyal families of the Redbones are also descendants of Doll.

==== Emanuel Cumbo ====
Emmanuel Cumbo was first recorded as a Christian servant in 1644. His parents were Emanuel and Joan, Africans from the Kingdom of Ndongo. He was able to obtain a release from his contract in 1665, when the House of Burgesses ruled he was not a slave for life, but rather an indentured servant. By 1667, he had been given a patent for fifty acres of land in Archers Hope Creek of James City County, where his parents had worked. He was one of the few African-American landowners early Virginia, and his descendants were free. Many Cumbo descendants in the United states can trace their ancestry back to Emmanuel Cumbo. (Note: Some variations of the surname present in the family are Cumba, Cumbee, and Combo.) Some branches of the Cumbo family were able to pass as Melungeon, while others began self-identifying as Lumbee.

==== Frances Driggus and Peter George ====
Frances was one of the first four Africans on the plantation of Edward Bennett. She was traded to Abraham Piersey in exchange for the construction of a fort near his land. She was listed on Piersey's plantation with her son Peter George in 1621. She was moved to the plantation of Francis Pott during the 1630s. Frances married Emanuel Driggus before the year 1640, and had five children with him. Peter was working as a carpenter in 1640 under Nathaniel Littleton. By 1656, when Frances had died, he had a wife and two daughters. He was a free man in 1676 after promising to pay ten thousand pounds of tobacco to his master, which he finished paying in 1682.

==== Edward Mozingo ====
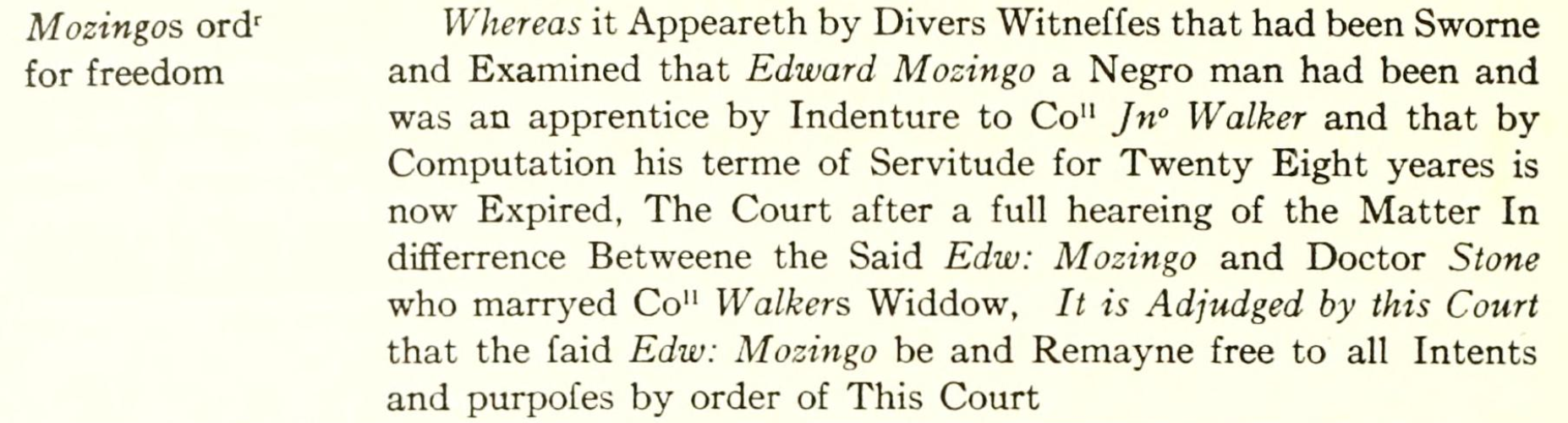
Entry regarding Edward Mozingo's order for freedom, October 5th 1672.

Edward is theorized to have been a Mbundu or Kongo man from the Kingdom of Kongo or Kingdom of Ndongo, previously named Duarte Mozinga. He initially lived on the Kingsmill Plantation. In the 1640s, he was on Col. John Walker's plantation in historic Warwick County. He married an Englishwoman named Margaret, and had three sons with her, two of which survived to adulthood. His son Edward Mozingo Jr. was born in 1642, in York County. Edward Sr. successfully sued for his own freedom in 1672, under a ruling by Governor William Berkeley presiding as judge.

In July 1711, Edward recorded his will, splitting his property between his wife and two surviving sons. His sons Edward and John both became leaseholders, and showed familial connections to other free Black families. Edward Jr.'s son patented land in North Carolina, where the effects of racism were not as harsh at the time. Edward's descendants became white within a few generations. They make up the Mozingo family in America, some of whom reside in the Northern Neck, where he had settled with Margaret.

==== Antoney and Isabel Tucker ====
Antoney and Isabel were slaves of Capt. William Tucker, and were the first African family in the Virginia Colony. They took their master's surname, and had their son William Tucker in 1624. He was the second documented African child in the colony, but the first one baptized. Many of his descendants live in Hampton.

==== John Pedro ====
John (Spanish: Juan) Pedro was baptized Catholic while in Africa. (Note: Juan Pedro's name followed Central African naming customs at the time, such that he had two first names. This system was applied to Christian names by the 16th century.) He was taken prisoner in 1619 by Imbangala fighting under Luís Mendes de Vasconcellos, and sold to the San Juan Bautista at the Port of Luanda. Pedro was taken by the Treasurer in 1619, and set to work in Bermuda. He was transported to England from 1620-1621. Capt. Francis West brought him to New England, first to Plymouth, and then to Weymouth. He was the first African and the first Catholic in the colony.

After approximately a year, they sailed to the Eastern Shore in 1623, where Pedro indentured himself as a servant, and served as a soldier at Fort Algernon. He was free by the 1650s when he began clearing land for his plantation and purchasing servants of his own. In 1654, he took up arms in support of Lord Baltimore and fought for the Catholics in the Battle of the Severn under Governor Stone. Stone's army lost, and Pedro was one of the soldiers executed in the aftermath, at the age of sixty. Pedro's descendants formed a community with the descendants of John Graweere in Lancaster County.

=== Other persons ===
- Angela (fl. 1619–1625), enslaved woman.
- Anthony Johnson (b. c. 1600 – d. 1670), indentured servant and landowner.
- Gabriel Jacobs (b. 1650)
- Jiro (fl. 1623 – d. 1624), lived on the plantation of Capt. Mathews on Hog Island. He did not use his baptismal name.
- John Graweere (ca. 1615 – living 1641), indentured servant and landowner.
- Margaret Cornish (b. c. 1610? – living 1670), indentured servant.
- Matthew (fl. 1628–1647), A slave on Matthew Ewen's plantation (The College Land).
- William (fl. 1621–1628), recorded on the Flowerdew Hundred Plantation.

== Artworks ==
Meta Vaux Warrick Fuller included a diorama of the 1619 arrival as part of her commission for the 1907 Jamestown Exposition, the first such granted to an African-American woman artist from the U.S. government. This work is no longer extant.

The 1940 American Negro Exposition included a historical diorama with a similar theme, and was restored in the 21st century. It is part of the collection of the Legacy Museum of Tuskegee University.

Sidney E. King painted a historical scene of the 1619 arrival for the National Park Service in the 1950s.

== Commemoration ==
Abraham Lincoln in his second inaugural address of 1865 refers to "the bondsman's two hundred and fifty years of unrequited toil", which would be approximately 1615, according to scholar Diana Schaub an allusion to the events of 1619.

The arrival was recognized by George Washington Williams as the starting point for African American history in the first comprehensive book ever written on the topic, the History of the Negro Race in America From 1619 to 1880: Negroes As Slaves, As Soldiers, And As Citizens, published in 1882.

The 350th anniversary of the arrival was marked in 1969 by a Virginia effort organized by civil rights attorney Oliver Hill, and with featured speaker Samuel DeWitt Proctor; it was however opposed by others including then-freshman state senator and future-Governor Douglas Wilder as an occasion inappropriate for celebration. There was also a commemoration of the 375th anniversary in 1994.

The 400th anniversary in 2019 was marked by the congressionally-chartered "400 Years of African-American History Commission" under the National Park Service, which administers Fort Monroe National Monument. That year also saw The 1619 Project of The New York Times and the Year of Return in Ghana.

== See also ==
- Atlantic Creole
- Coastwise slave trade
- Colonial South and the Chesapeake
- Great Dismal Swamp maroons
- History of slavery in Virginia
- Scramble
- Seasoning
- Slavery in the colonial history of the United States
- William Tucker, the first person of African descent born in the Thirteen British Colonies

== Bibliography ==
- Breen, T.H.; Innes, Stephen (September 16, 2005). "Myne owne ground": Race and Freedom on Virginia's Eastern Shore, 1640-1676 (25th Anniversary ed.). New York, NY: Oxford University Press. ISBN 0-19-517537-9.
- Deal, Joseph Douglas III (1981). Race and Class in Colonial Virginia: Indians, Englishmen, and Africans on the Eastern Shore During the Seventeenth Century. ProQuest (PhD thesis). Rochester, New York: University of Rochester.
- Hashaw, Tim (2007). The Birth of Black America: The First African Americans and the Pursuit of Freedom at Jamestown. New York, NY: Carroll & Graf Publishers. ISBN 978-0-78671-718-7.
- Kearns, Andre (2022). "A Cumbo Family Lineage: Connecting The Dots". Journal of the Afro-American Historical and Genealogical Society. 38. Afro-American Historical and Genealogical Society: 22–29. ISSN 0272-1937.
- Knight, K. I. (January 2019). "Documenting the 1619 San Juan Bautista Africans: The First Africans In England's Virginia". Journal of the Afro-American Historical & Genealogical Society. 36. Afro-American Historical and Genealogical Society: 16–27. ISSN 0272-1937.
- Mozingo, Joe (October 2012). The Fiddler on Pantico Run: An African Captive, His White Descendants, a Search for Family (Hardcover ed.). New York: Free Press. ISBN 978-1-4516-2748-0.
