= White Lion (privateer) =

Privateer which brought the first Africans to Virginia

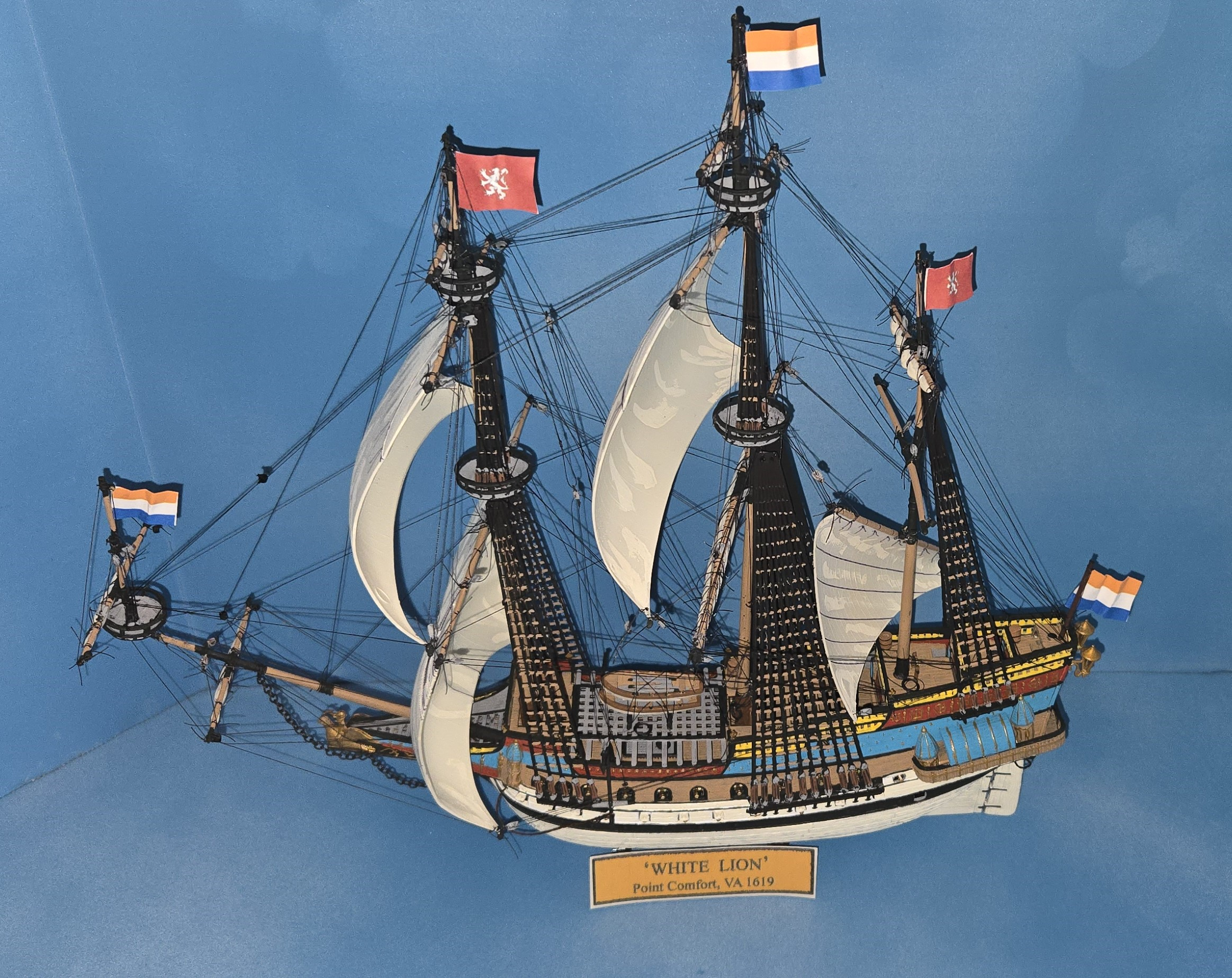
Model of White Lion on display

The White Lion was a 160-ton English privateer ship operating under a Dutch letter of marque which brought the first Africans to the English colony of Virginia in August 1619, a calendar year before the arrival of the Mayflower in New England (November 1620). Though the African captives were sold into a mixture of both chattel slavery and indentured servitude, the event is regarded as the start of African slavery in the colonial history of the United States.

The first enslaved Africans in the current boundaries of the United States landed in 1526 in the expedition of Spanish explorer Lucas Vázquez de Ayllón on the South Carolina and Georgia coasts. Some escaped and are thought to have joined Native Americans, if they survived. In 1527, Estevanico, an enslaved Moor, participated in the Spanish Narváez expedition. Enslaved Africans were also part of the Spanish expedition to Florida in 1539 with Hernando de Soto, and the 1565 founding of St. Augustine, Florida.

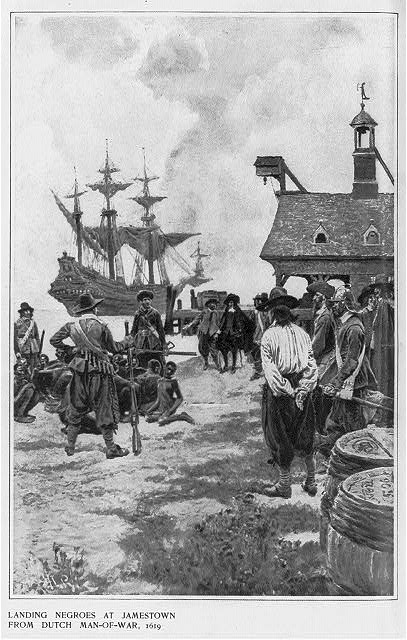
A 1901 illustration of the landing of the first Africans in Virginia. The White Lion is seen anchored in the background.

The Africans on the White Lion were probably among the thousands who had been captured in 1618–1619 by a slave raiding force primarily consisting of African raiders, under nominal Portuguese leadership, who were at war with the Kingdom of Ndongo. These particular enslaved Africans were taken on the Spanish slave ship San Juan Bautista from Luanda, Angola, capital of the Portuguese settlements in Angola.

The White Lion, along with another privateer, the Treasurer, commanded by Daniel Elfrith, intercepted the San Juan Bautista on its way to modern-day Veracruz on the Gulf coast of New Spain (present-day Mexico). The two ships captured and divided part of the Spanish ship's African captives, under the aegis of Dutch letters of marque from Maurice, Prince of Orange. White Lion captain John Colyn Jope sailed for the Virginia colony to sell the twenty-four African captives, first landing in Point Comfort, in modern-day Hampton Roads.

As John Rolfe, secretary of the colony of Virginia, wrote to Virginia Company of London treasurer Edwin Sandys:

About the latter end of August, a Dutch man of Warr of the burden of a 160 tunnes arrived at Point-Comfort, the Comandors name Capt Jope, his Pilott for the West Indies one Mr Marmaduke an Englishman. They mett with the Treasurer in the West Indyes, and determined to hold consort shipp hetherward, but in their passage lost one the other. He brought not any thing but 20. and odd Negroes, which the Governor and Cape Marchant bought for victualls (whereof he was in greate need as he pretended) at the best and easyest rates they could.

After being sold off the White Lion, two of the slaves, Isabella and Anthony, married and had a child in 1624. William Tucker, named after a Virginian planter, was the first recorded person of African ancestry born in English America.

== See also ==
- Clotilda, the last known slave ship to bring slaves to North America.
- The 1619 Project
