= John Graweere =

One of the First Africans in Virginia (born c. 1615)

John Graweere also known as John Gowen (ca. 1615–living 1641) (Note: His surname was spelled a number of ways, Graweere, Gowen, Grasheare, Grashere, and Geawean. His son was Mihill or Michael with the Gowen surname, but also spelled Gowree and Goen.) was one of the First Africans in Virginia, who was a servant who earned enough money to pay for his son's freedom. He filed a lawsuit to free his son, arguing that he wanted to raise him as a Christian. The court agreed and freed the son.

== Early life ==
John Graweere was born in Africa around 1615 with the name of João Geaween. He was likely born in Angola. He is believed to have arrived in Virginia between the 1620s or early 1630s. (Note: Hashaw states that Graweere arrived in 1619.) A man named John was a servant of ship captain William Evans or Ewins. John was in England in 1622 when he departed on the James for Virginia.

== Servitude ==
He was among the First Africans in Virginia. He lived in James City (now Jamestown), one of the few black indentured servants, and likely worked as a field hand in tobacco fields for William Evans. It was not clear if he was enslaved for a lifetime or was a servant for a set number of years. Graweere was able to raise hogs and the earnings were split between himself and Evans.

== Marriage and child ==
He met Margaret Cornish around 1635. She was born in Africa and in Virginia she was enslaved by Lieutenant Robert Sheppard, who owned the Chippoke plantation in Surry County, Virginia. John and Margaret had a boy named Mihill or Michael in 1635 or in the late 1630s. About 1635, Graweere attained his freedom, but he did not have enough money yet to buy Margaret's freedom.

Margaret entered into a relationship with a white gentleman Robert Sweat (or Sweet), and they had a mixed-race child around 1640. The Virginia General Assembly censured the couple for fornication on October 17, 1640. His punishment was to wear a white gown to church. Cornish was whipped. He lost interest in freeing Cornish, but he had saved his earnings and had enough money to purchase his son. It was unclear, though, who legally owned the boy.

== Legal suit ==
Graweere was one of the first African Americans to petition the court. He filed a lawsuit in on March 31, 1641 to purchase his son from Lieutenant Robert Sheppard, who was the slaveholder of the enslaved woman and her child. Graweere's intention was to raise his son as a Christian, specifically of the Church of England. Graweere won the court case, which said that the boy should "remain at the disposing and education of the said Graweere and the child's godfather - who undertaketh to see it brought up in the Christian religion as aforesaid." Robert Sheppard was the boy's godfather. He was not to be a servant or slave to Evans or others. Graweere was said to have "exhibited a sure-handed understanding of Chesapeake social hierarchy and the complex dynamics of patron-client relations."

== Descendants ==
Map of Goins families, 1790-1830.

Graweere arranged for his son to be indentured until the age of 21 with a planter, Christopher Stafford. His intention was to have his son obtain an education. While still at the Stafford plantation, Mihill fathered a child with an enslaved black woman known as Prossa as well as Pallassa, a Kimbundu name. (Note: Her name was stated Rosa in the General order) Gowen was freed of his indentured servitude by Christopher Stafford in his will and he lived in York County, Virginia. Ann Barnhouse, sister of Christopher Stafford, went to court in 1655 to free William Gowen, the son of Gowen and Prossa. Barnhouse, of Martin's Hundred, had William baptized and she posted a bond for the boy. She vowed "never to trouble Mihill Gowen or his son, William, or to demand service". (Note: In 1657, Gowen and his son were free and previously held by Christopher Stafford and Ann Barnhouse. A slave named Rosa was listed in the record. The subject was "The freedom of Mihill and his son William".) Gowen was free in 1657. Mihill took his son with him when he was freed, but he was not able to take Prossa with them. Gowen bought several acres to farm tobacco in James City County. He developed a relationship with a white woman.

The Goins families in the United States are paternally descended from Graweere, including ones in groups such as the Melungeons and the Lumbee.
