= Old Point Comfort =

East end of the Virginia Peninsula

Coordinates: 37°00′02″N 76°18′41″W

Old Point Comfort is a point of land located in the independent city of Hampton, Virginia. Previously known as Point Comfort, it lies at the extreme tip of the Virginia Peninsula at the mouth of Hampton Roads in the United States. It was renamed Old Point Comfort to differentiate it from New Point Comfort 21 miles (34 km) up the Chesapeake Bay. A group of enslaved Africans (first fleet) was brought to colonial Virginia at this point in 1619. Today the location is home to Continental Park and Fort Monroe National Monument.

== History ==
=== 17th and 18th centuries ===
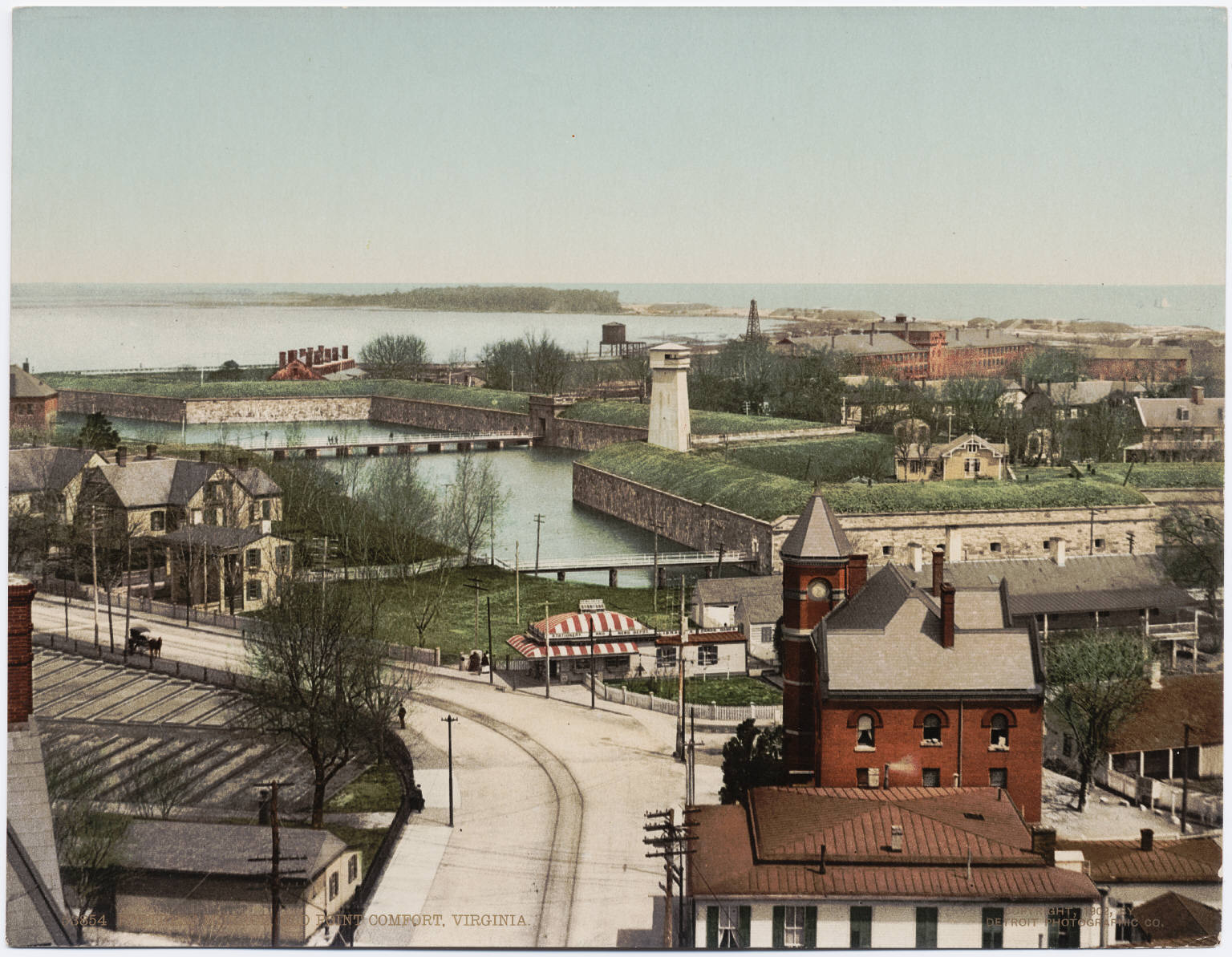
Old Point Comfort, c. 1900

For more than 400 years, Point Comfort served as a maritime navigational landmark and military stronghold.

According to a combination of old records and legend, the name derived from an incident when the Jamestown settlers first arrived. Captain Christopher Newport's flagship, Susan Constant, anchored nearby on 28 April 1607. Members of the crew "rowed to a point where they found a channel which put them in good comfort". They named the adjacent land Cape Comfort.

Point Comfort formed the beginning of the boundary of the Colony of Virginia. The Second Charter of the Virginia Company, granted in 1609, gave the company:

all those Lands, Countries, and Territories, situate, lying, and being in that Part of America, called Virginia, from the pointe of lande called Cape or Pointe Comfort all alonge the seacoste to the northward two hundred miles and from the said pointe of Cape Comfort all alonge the sea coast to the southward twoe hundred miles; and all that space and circuit of lande lieinge from the sea coaste of the precinct aforesaid upp unto the lande, throughoute, from sea to sea, west and northwest . . .

Because of the ambiguity as to which line was to run west and which northwest, the charter gave the Virginia Company either about 80,000 square miles (210,000 km^{2}) of eastern North America, or about one-third of the entire continent, extending to the Pacific Ocean. The Colony of Virginia chose the interpretation which gave it the larger area, and the Commonwealth of Virginia continued to claim much of the Ohio Valley and beyond, until after the American Revolution. In 1784, Virginia gave up most of these claims, and the relinquished area was organized as the Territory Northwest of the River Ohio (commonly known as the Northwest Territory) on July 13, 1787. In 1789, the remaining claims were abandoned when Virginia allowed Kentucky to become its own state, which it did on June 1, 1792.

In the fall of 1609, a Captain John Ratcliffe built the first English fort in the area, known as Fort Algernon.

In August 1619, the First Africans in Virginia arrived in what was then known as the Colony of Virginia (although the first people of direct African descent on mainland North America were enslaved by a Spanish colony in South Carolina in 1526, and the first recorded birth with direct African ancestry took place in Florida in 1606). Those enslaved arrived in the White Lion, a privateer owned by Robert Rich, 2nd Earl of Warwick, but flying a Dutch flag, which docked at Point Comfort. The approximately 20-25 Africans had been enslaved during a war fought by Portugal and some local African allies, against the Kingdom of Ndongo, in modern Angola, and had been taken off a Portuguese slave ship, the São João Bautista.

The humid conditions and exposure to Atlantic coastal storms caused the plank and timber forts at these locations to constantly deteriorate. In 1630, Capt Samuel Matthews was commissioned to rebuild the fort at Old Point Comfort, and it was completed by 1632.

In 1665, Colonel Miles Cary, a member of the Virginia Governor's Council, was assigned to place armaments at the fort during heightened tensions resulting from the Second Anglo-Dutch War. Cary was hit by a cannonball from a Dutch frigate, and died of those wounds on June 10, 1667.

=== 18th and 19th century ===
The Virginia colonies would build another fort at Point Comfort called Fort George in 1728. Despite it being made of masonry, Fort George was washed away by The Coastal Hurricane of 1749. Without a fort to protect the waterway from warships, the lighthouse was captured by the British during the War of 1812, when a Royal Navy fleet sailed into the Chesapeake. After their futile attempt to seize the town of Norfolk, the British landed at Old Point Comfort and used the lighthouse tower as an observation post. From there they invaded and captured Hampton on June 25, 1813. Afterwards, they routed an American force at Bladensburg before marching on to capture and burn Washington, D.C. in retaliation for the American destruction of York.

Construction on Fort Monroe began in 1819 and it was first garrisoned in 1823, though construction continued for nearly 25 years afterwards. Initially named Fortress Monroe, it was officially renamed as a fort in 1832, though it has often been called by the original name ever since. During the Marquis de LaFayette's famous trip to the United States in 1824-1825, the Marquis admired the Old Point Comfort stronghold which had been designed by French born engineer Simon Bernard.

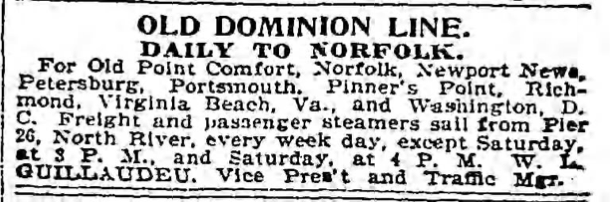
Old Dominion Steamship Company New York to Chesapeake Bay Ports advertisement, March 19, 1898

In the 19th and first half of the 20th centuries Old Point Comfort served as the terminus and connection point for passenger and express freight ships connecting cities of Chesapeake Bay by both water and rail routes with Boston, New York and along the southeastern coast. A steamship service example was the Baltimore Steamship Packet Company's Old Bay Line. Old Point Comfort was a stop on a Norfolk-Old Point Comfort-Baltimore circuit.

=== 20th century ===
Rail lines, including the New York, Philadelphia and Norfolk Railroad, provided rail car through ferry service from Old Point Comfort to Cape Charles on the Eastern Shore of Virginia, across the Chesapeake Bay. At Cape Charles, land route connections to points north could be made with the New York, Philadelphia and Norfolk Railroad (and its successor parent company, the Pennsylvania Railroad) on the eastern peninsula to Wilmington, Delaware and Philadelphia. The Zero Mile Post for the Chesapeake and Ohio Railway is also here, and represents the end of the line from which all main line distances were measured between Fort Monroe and Cincinnati. The station at Fort Monroe closed in 1939. And the Zero Mile Post was shifted north to Phoebus.

For most of the 19th and 20th centuries, Old Point Comfort was a summer and winter resort in the town of Phoebus in Elizabeth City County. Old Point Comfort is the location of historic Fort Monroe, The Chamberlin, and the Old Point Comfort Light.

The pier that was used by government vessels as well as being a routine stopping point for commercial shipping lines was government owned. In 1952 the residents of both the town and county voted to be consolidated with the independent city of Hampton.

On November 12, 1959, the Army issued notice it was closing the pier and that it would be removed. On January 2, 1960, the Army announced the pier would be open only "at your own risk" to visitors from shore, including guests of the Chamberlin Hotel that overlooked the pier, but closed to boat traffic and travelers. Steamship travel had declined after World War II and the last line using the Old Point Comfort stop was the Baltimore Steam Packet Company operating as the Old Bay Line. The line's City of Richmond made the last stop at the pier December 30, 1959. Despite a court injunction based on the terms under which Virginia ceded the land to the Federal Government in 1821 the pier was destroyed after federal courts overruled the injunction. The pier was demolished by the end of May 1961.

Old Point Comfort was the site in 1909 where Southern Baptists and Northern Baptists inaugurated negotiations toward a comity agreement.

It was near Old Point Comfort that the USS Missouri (BB-63), then the only U.S. battleship in commission, was proceeding seaward on a training mission from Hampton Roads early on January 17, 1950, when she ran aground 1.6 miles (3.0 km) from Thimble Shoal Light,(near Old Point Comfort. She hit shoal water a distance of three ship-lengths from the main channel. Lifted some seven feet above waterline, she stuck hard and fast. With the aid of tugboats, pontoons, and an incoming tide, she was refloated on 1 February 1950 and repaired.

== See also ==
- Fort Algernon
- Fort Monroe
- Phoebus, Virginia
