= Gibson family (Virginia) =

Family of free African-American origin from the Colony of Virginia

Gibson (Virginia)
- Current region: United States
- Origin: Colony of Virginia

The Gibson family is a family of free African-American origin from the Colony of Virginia. Members gained freedom and land within the colony in the 17th century. The ethnic identity of the family has historically been debated by government officials, and modern scholars discuss the family as an example of passing in the United States. Some members of the family passed as white, and others became part of various Melungeon communities. Genetic and genealogical analysis indicate the family to have European and African ancestry.

Some notable members of the family were the Regulator Gideon Gibson Jr. and former senator Randall Lee Gibson.

== History ==
Map of Gibson families on the 1790 United states census, only Virginia and the Carolinas are shown.

Map of Gibson families on the 1830 United states census. Note families in the counties of Hawkins and Hancock in Tennessee, where Melungeon communities were documented.

Census data from Price (1950).

The Gibson family was documented as originating from free African-Americans in Virginia. Some originate from Hubbard Gibson, son of Elizabeth Chavis. Over time, some members were able to pass the color line, becoming white.

=== Colonial era ===
Within Virginia, the Gibson family negotiated better conditions for themselves, such as being paid their own earnings, freedom from slavery, and greater levels of independence. In 1672, Elizabeth Chavis negotiated the freedom of her son Gibson (Gibby) Gibson in a court near Jamestown, Virginia. In the colony, the principle of partus sequitur ventrem dictated that the offspring of a free woman were also free, resulting in the first communities of free people of color. Her sons Gibby and Hubbard became land-owning slaveowners afterward. Their relative Jane Gibson had descendants illegally held as slaves during the 18th century, only thirteen of which were able to sue for their freedom.

The Gibson family was present on the early colonial frontier of historic Louisa County in 1745, along with the free African-American Bunch and Collins families. These Gibsons were shown to be ancestral to other Gibson families later on in other areas via genetic and genealogical analysis. Along with other free families of color, they were outnumbered by whites and slaves, and were vulnerable to being enslaved themselves. They also had issues with debt and maintaining property ownership from one generation to the next. The legislature of Virginia began removing the rights of free Black people, such as the right to own property, the right to bear arms, and the right to travel.

==== Settlement of North Carolina ====
By 1755, they were living in Orange County, North Carolina with the Bunch and Collins families. The Gibson, Bunch, and Chavis families owned over 1000 acres of land along the Roanoke River in the counties of Northampton and Halifax, along with slaves. Hubbard Gibson had previously moved to North Carolina with his children in the early 1720s, against the background of increasing legal restrictions on free African-Americans in Virginia.

==== Initial settlement in South Carolina ====
The Gibsons were among the first settlers of the South Carolinian backcountry. Hubbard's son Gideon Gibson Sr. moved with the family to the state from Virginia in 1731, causing a disturbance in Craven County. The House of Assembly complained, saying that the Gibson family consisted of colored men with white wives, who intended to settle on the Santee River. South Carolina governor Robert Johnson summoned Gibson Sr. in response to the complaints, and allowed the family to settle in the state after meeting him. He stated they were "not Negroes nor Slaves but Free people", noting they had black slaves, white wives, paid taxes, and were of good repute. Authors remarked the race of the Gibson family seemed to matter less, or not at all, compared to their social class, and they were able to be free of being defined as Negro or mulatto, partially due to being wealthy, useful, and pro-slavery.

They went on to be granted hundreds of acres in the backcountry, at Mars Bluff in an area populated by Welsh settlers. The family grew corn, cash crops, and livestock on the bluffs of the Pee Dee River, which provided protection from Native American raids. They married into the neighboring families, with the sister of Gibson Sr. marrying a wealthy planter.

Gideon Gibson Jr., free Black son of Gibson Sr., married a white woman, came to own seven slaves, and was appointed the administrator of an estate. By 1768 he led a band of Regulators in South Carolina. After defeating and whipping a local militia, Gibson and the Regulators were depicted in Charleston as a "Rogues party" of "Whites, Blacks and Mulattoes." Scholar Daniel J. Sharfstein proposed the precedent of Black people whipping whites meant that slaves joining the conflict could have caused the Regulator movement to overwhelm South Carolina. In response, the province strategically pardoned all Regulators except for Gideon Jr.'s band, and sent George Gabriel Powell to deal with him.

==== Classification of the family by the Assembly of South Carolina ====
Powell sought to have the Negro Act of 1740 brought against Gideon Jr., but was opposed by South Carolina Assembly member Henry Laurens. Laurens opined that Gibson Jr. had "more Red and White in his face" than half of the French Huguenot descendants in the Assembly, and that his children looked whiter than Powell himself. Privately, Lauren preferred the Gibson family classified as Black, as he later stated in a letter:

"to confine them to their original clothing will be best. They may and ought to continue a separate people, may be subjected by special laws, kept harmless, made useful and freed from the tyranny and arbitrary power of individual..."

Sharfstein states Lauren chose the realities of life over the law with respect to Gibson Jr.'s case, with Lauren proposing that "Reasoning from the colour carries no conviction...By perseverance the black may be blanched and the 'stamp of Providence' effectually effaced." The Assembly chose not to pursue Gibson Jr., and he returned to planter life afterwards. The reforms he sought were eventually granted.

In his final essay, historian Winthrop D. Jordan proposed that the case of the Gibson family demonstrated the Province of South Carolina, with its Black majority, was unique relative to other Anglo-dominated colonies. He stated that the colony was more open about miscegenation and giving higher status to mulatto people, and that the outcome of the Gibson family's case would not have occurred in the other continental colonies. He also stated the state of South Carolina remained relatively more fluid with respect to racial boundaries even after the American Revolution.

=== Antebellum to Reconstruction ===
In 1794, a branch of the Gibson family was still in South Carolina, when a petition was signed to remove the poll tax on free Black people. They were living with the Collins, Bolton, and Goins families, as well as with the Oxendine family associated with the Lumbee.

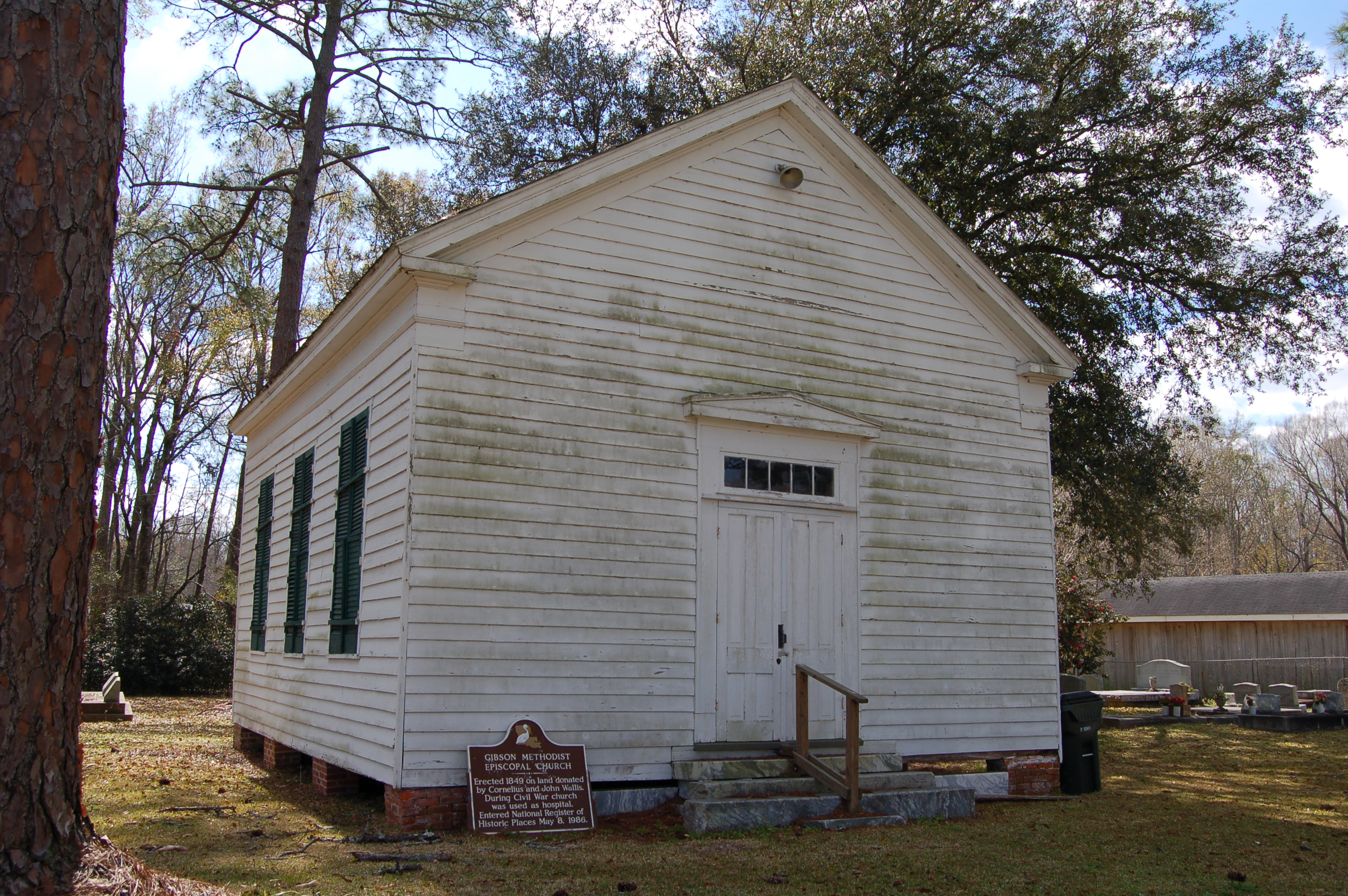
Gibson Methodist Episcopal Church

Another branch of the Gibson family settled Natchez, Mississippi earlier in 1781, later forming a "Gibson neighborhood" south of Vicksburg in Warren County, where they were among the first adherents to Methodism in the area. Gideon Jr.'s son Reverend Randall Gibson became part of a post-Revolution wave of Methodists, and was stated to be "the first man that ever joined the Methodist Episcopal Church south and west of the great Indian Nations." Sarah Gibson Humphreys said a member of the family named the city of Houma, Louisiana.

By 1833, the Mississippi branch had a seasonal home, and later plantation, near Tigerville, Louisiana. Both were started by Tobias Gibson. Their plantations were confiscated or ruined after the Civil War, and a few members of the family died during the war itself.

In 1857, a different branch of the family was listed as white in a Tennessee "Melungeon Town", with the Goins and Collins families.

==== Narratives and discussion of racial origin ====
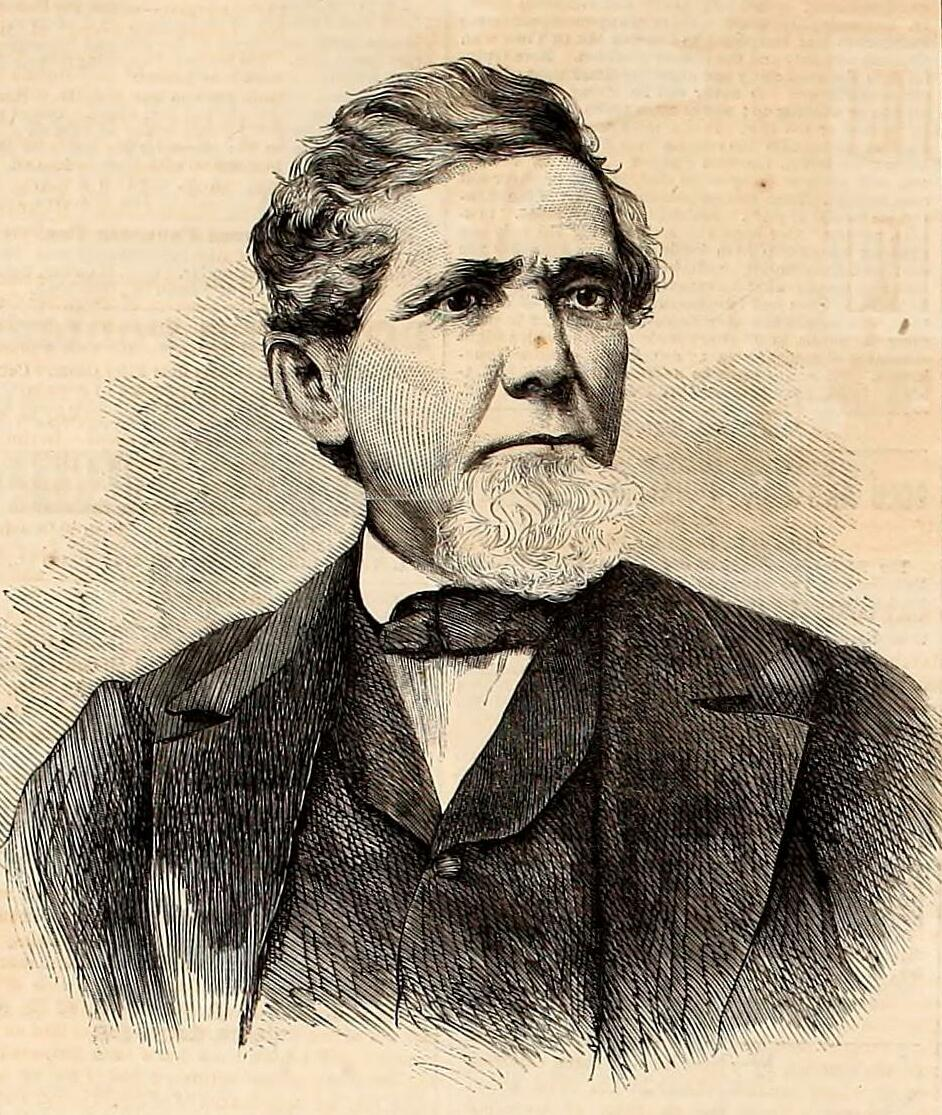
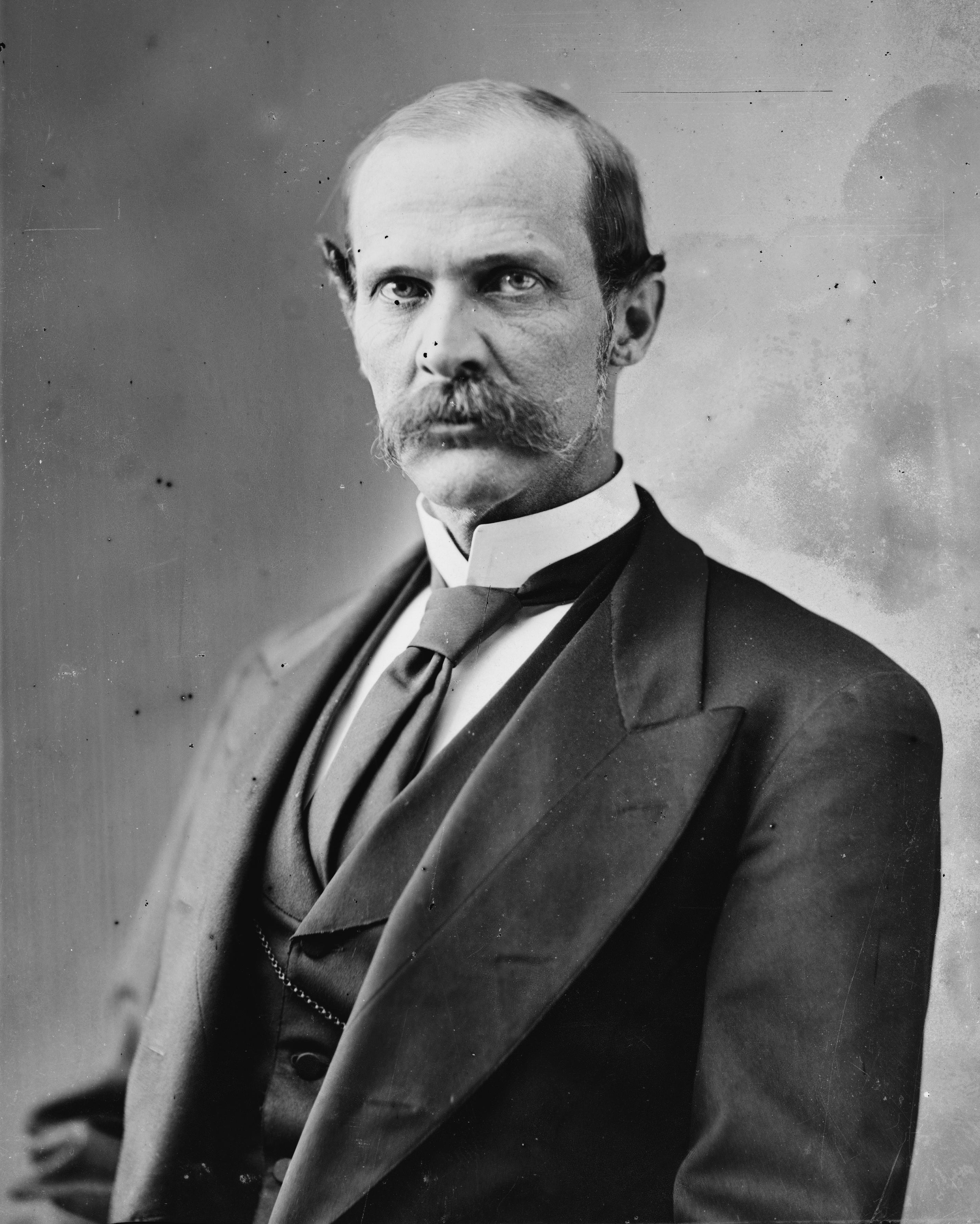
James Madison Wells and Russell Lee Gibson, political opponents. Wells stated Gibson was of African descent.

The Mississippi branch of the Gibson family cultivated a myth of Roma ancestry, providing an explanation for their darker features. Reverend John Griffing Jones suggested they descended from "Portuguese Huguenots" who settled in South Carolina. Sharfstein noted the existence of "little races" in the Antebellum South, many members having the same Gibson surname previously present among the first free people of color in colonial Virginia. Some examples of these groups he gave were Wesorts, Redlegs, Brass Ankles, and Croatans. He stated they often narrated different racial origins, such as Turks, mixed Portuguese-Natives, Berbers, Sephardic Jews, or Roanoke colonists.

In 1878, James Madison Wells accused Democrat senator Randall Lee Gibson of having African lineage, referring to him only as a "colored Democratic Representative". Randall was the son of Tobias Gibson. His comments, and Randall's response, were published in local newspapers.Randall and his brother McKinley wrote to Reverend Jones, as well as John Francis Hamtramck Claiborne for information on their family origins, to which they responded with positive accounts of their grandfather and extended family. Sharfstein suggested that white Southerners defended Randall due to the precedent of someone of his stature losing their whiteness; meaning the same could happen to them. Members of the family later located Gideon Gibson Jr. as one of their ancestors with genealogical research.

== Modern discussion ==
Author Tim Hashaw describes a Melungeon branch of the Gibson family having worked in Appalachian coal mines alongside Polish, Italian, and Jewish miners, as well as members of the Adkins, Mullins, Sizemore, and Bunch families, in an area stretching from West Virginia to Kentucky. Members of the Gibson family still live in an area around Lexington, where Randall Lee Gibson's father lived. Researchers found historical "Melungeon" members of the family lived in the counties of Hanover, Louisa, Montgomery, Grayson, Russell in Virginia, Granville, Orange, Wilkes, Ashe, in North Carolina, as well as Hawkins and Hancock in Tennessee.

A 1962 article by Winthrop D. Jordan addressed the passing of the color line by the Gibson family, leading to further discussion on the topic. Sharfstein notes Gibson family members took up genealogy as a hobby, spending time attempting to prove the family did not descend from African slaves. William Labach, a descendant of Sarah Gibson Humphreys and genealogist with a master's in history, said he had seen multiple theories explaining why the family were seen as people of color, adding he tended to disbelieve them. Historian Paul Spickard compared the family to the Hemings family, suggesting both showed the leakages in the color line between Black and white.

Genetic analysis in 2011 by Estes, Goins, Ferguson et al. on members of the family showed they had a mixture of paternal African and European Y-DNA lineages (R-L21, E1b1a, and R-M269), while only possessing European maternal mtDNA lineages (H). This surprised the researchers due to the higher historical consanguinity of these families. They stated that Paul Heinegg's genealogical analysis of families in early Virginia offered an explanation, given he showed they mostly descended from unions of African men with white women.

== Family tree ==
Gibson family (Virginia)

Elizabeth Chavis	Unnamed man
Unnamed woman	Hubbard Gibson	Gibby Gibson
Unnamed white woman	Gideon Gibson Sr.
Gideon Gibson Jr.	Mary O'Connell
Rev. Randall Gibson	Harriet McKinley
Louisa Breckenridge Hart	Tobias Gibson
Mary Montgomery	Randall Lee Gibson	Sarah Gibson Humphreys
Preston Gibson	Minna Field
Henry Field

== See also ==
- African-American genealogy
- African Americans in Virginia
- Ashworth family
- Blackwell Family of Virginia
- Bunch family
- Chavis family
- Dominickers
- Healy family
- Henry Field (anthropologist)
- Passing (racial identity)
- Quander family
- Syphax family
