= Emanuel Driggus =

Enslaved man who became free landowner

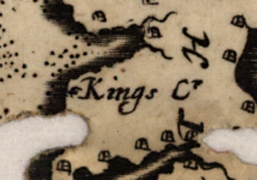
- King's Creek in Northampton County, 1670, during time of Emanuel Driggus's leasehold.
- Born: Angola, suggested to be the Kingdom of Ndongo.
- Died: 1685–1686 (Note: J. Douglas Deal writes that Driggus was last documented in 1685, proposing he died during the period of 1685-1686.); Magotha Bay, Northampton County, Virginia
- Other names: Surnames: Drighouse, Rodriggus, Dregis, Driggs, Driggers Given names: Manuel/Manuell, Emanuell
- Occupations: Enslaved servant, livestock farmer, planter
- Employer(s): Francis Pott, Roger Booker, Stephen Charlton, William Kendall
- Known for: Free Black landowner in colonial Virginia
- Spouse(s): Frances Driggus, Elizabeth Driggus
- Children: 10, including Elizabeth, Jane, Thomas, Mary, Edward, William, and Ann.

Emanuel Driggus (Portuguese: Emanuel Rodriges; fl. 1645–1685) was an enslaved Atlantic Creole in the mid-seventeenth century in the Colony of Virginia. The name Driggus/Drighouse is a corruption of the Portuguese name Rodrigues.

While enslaved, he was able to raise and sell livestock, obtaining capital for himself. He later achieved freedom, and became a free Black landowner. He also supported several enslaved Black children, donating livestock to assist them in obtaining freedom. In his later life, he became a servant to pay off his debts.

He founded one of the prolific free Black households on the Eastern Shore of Virginia, the descendants of whom intermarried with other free families on the frontier. Today, the Driggers and Drighouse families in the United States descend from Driggus.

== Biography ==
Author Tim Hashaw states Driggus was from the area now known as Angola, and suggests he was born to the First Africans in Virginia from the Kingdom of Ndongo. (Note: Author K.I. Knight suggests Driggus was one of three unnamed African men held by Governor George Yeardley.) He was a Christian, having converted while in Africa. Historian Thomas C. Holt believes Driggus first arrived on the Eastern Shore of Virginia during the 1620s–1630s.

Driggus and his wife Frances, one of the first Africans in Virginia, first appear in a record of sale in 1645 to Captain Francis Pott, the brother of governor John Pott. The couple agreed to a contract of limited indenture for their foster daughters Elizabeth and Jane, wherein Pott promised they would be raised as Christians. Jane was the colony-born daughter of Margaret Cornish, who was from the Kingdom of Ndongo. The Driggus couple had other children, who were born into slavery.

Pott gave Driggus his first cow and calf in 1645. Driggus raised multiple kinds of livestock while enslaved, negotiating with his masters to recognize he owned them legally. He bought and traded them frequently, amassing wealth for himself and improving his place in society.

=== Changes in residence ===
Emanuel and Frances were later sold to Pott's cousin Mary Menifee in 1648 to cover his debt, and were thus separated from their children. Menifee sold them to the planter Stephen Charlton. As Charlton also allowed him to raise cattle, Driggus was able to purchase Jane's freedom in 1652 using his earnings. In 1657, Pott sold Emanuel's children Ann and Edward Driggus as permanent slaves, rather than indentured servants. While enslaved, Driggus passed down many animals to his and other people's children, reportedly to help them benefit materially. When questioned on his ability to own a large herd of chickens, cattle, and pigs as a Black man, Pott and Charlton came to his defense, both swearing he had acquired them honestly while under their service. (Note: Historian Philip D. Morgan states Black quarters around the Chesapeake during the colonial era tended to have larger herds of cattle than white ones.)

=== Freedom and land ownership ===
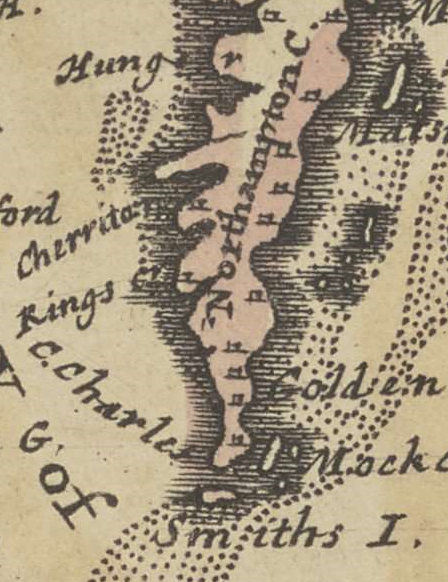
Northampton County in 1732. King's Creek can be seen labelled on the west coast.

After being resold twice, Driggus was inherited by William Kendall when Kendall married Pott's widow. Driggus was freed in the 1650s by Kendall. He then became a planter, joining other free Black men in the colony such as Anthony Johnson, Sebastian Cane, Philip Mongnum, and Anthony Longo as landowners.

For the price of 7500 pounds of tobacco, Driggus acquired a 145 acre leasehold on King's Creek, Northampton County from Kendall in 1665, growing tobacco and raising horses. To help finance the lease, he sublet the least valuable 50 acres of the tract to a white tenant farmer for 2500 pounds of tobacco. By then, he was a widower and had remarried a white woman named Elizabeth, but he continued to provide for the enslaved children from his first marriage. He also nursed the English sailor George Williams during his illness, who left him his wages and estate upon his death in 1667.

==== Departure from Kendall's tract ====
In 1672, Driggus moved with his family after exchanging his tract for his neighbor's on King's Creek. Unlike his first property, he held this one free of any debt. Seeing to the needs of enslaved Black people in the colony, he stood as security for Hannah Carter, and later gave a mare to his enslaved daughters Frances and Ann. Over his lifetime, Driggus gave up multiple calves and heifers to purchase the freedom of Black slave children not related to himself.

=== Return to servitude ===
Due to the rise of legal restrictions on free Black people, Driggus faced struggles in the later part of his life. He was often called into court to pay various debts he owed. He was fined 450 pounds of tobacco for entertaining two servants in 1672 (Note: Entertaining or harboring servants was made illegal in 1619. In 1699, the Virginia Assembly required every newly freed Black person to leave the colony, partially due to fears of them entertaining their former master's slaves.), then had to hire himself out as a servant in 1674 on the property of John Custis to cover his debts. The same year, he was unable to offer assistance to his daughter Mary when she had an illegitimate child. The last record of Driggus was a debt he owed to a deceased planter in 1685.

== Descendants ==
Most children of Emanuel Driggus, such as Ann and Edward, remained slaves. (Note: A partial map of the Driggus (Drighouse) family tree is present on pages of 282–283 of Colonial Chesapeake Society (1988).) His enslaved son Thomas Driggus eventually married the free Black woman Sarah King in 1667 or 1668. Their children were born free because she was free, according to the principle of partus sequitur ventrem. After facing a charge of fornication, they were allowed to cohabit on the land of William Kendall.

Sarah Driggus eventually left Kendall's plantation, but bore Thomas several children afterwards. Scholar Douglas Deal suggests she departed due to growing restrictions on her and their children's lifestyles due to living with an enslaved man. (Note: Under the doctrine of coverture, officials attempted to have the legal person of the wife of a slave vested under her husband's master. Deal notes (Sarah) Driggus had minimal interaction with white people, and that there is a lack of evidence of her hiring herself out or providing services for others.) Their daughter Frances won a case for her freedom from indenture in 1695 against John Brewer, who had hired John Custis as legal counsel. Emanuel's son William Driggus had previously been summoned to court for stealing from Custis.

=== Free relatives ===
Emanuel's adoptive daughter Jane Driggus was charged with fornication for having a child with an Irish man in 1663. She married the free Black man John Gussall afterwards, who died within a few years. Jane Gussall was remarried to William Harman, another free Black man.

Thomas's grandson Azaricum Driggus was apprenticed to a Richard Carver in 1716, with the proviso of providing him with 2 months of schooling per year. He later took up work as a carpenter, was married, and leased land for a house in 1722. By 1738, Azaricum's estate, slaves included, was valued above two-thirds of his neighbors.

=== Later descendants ===
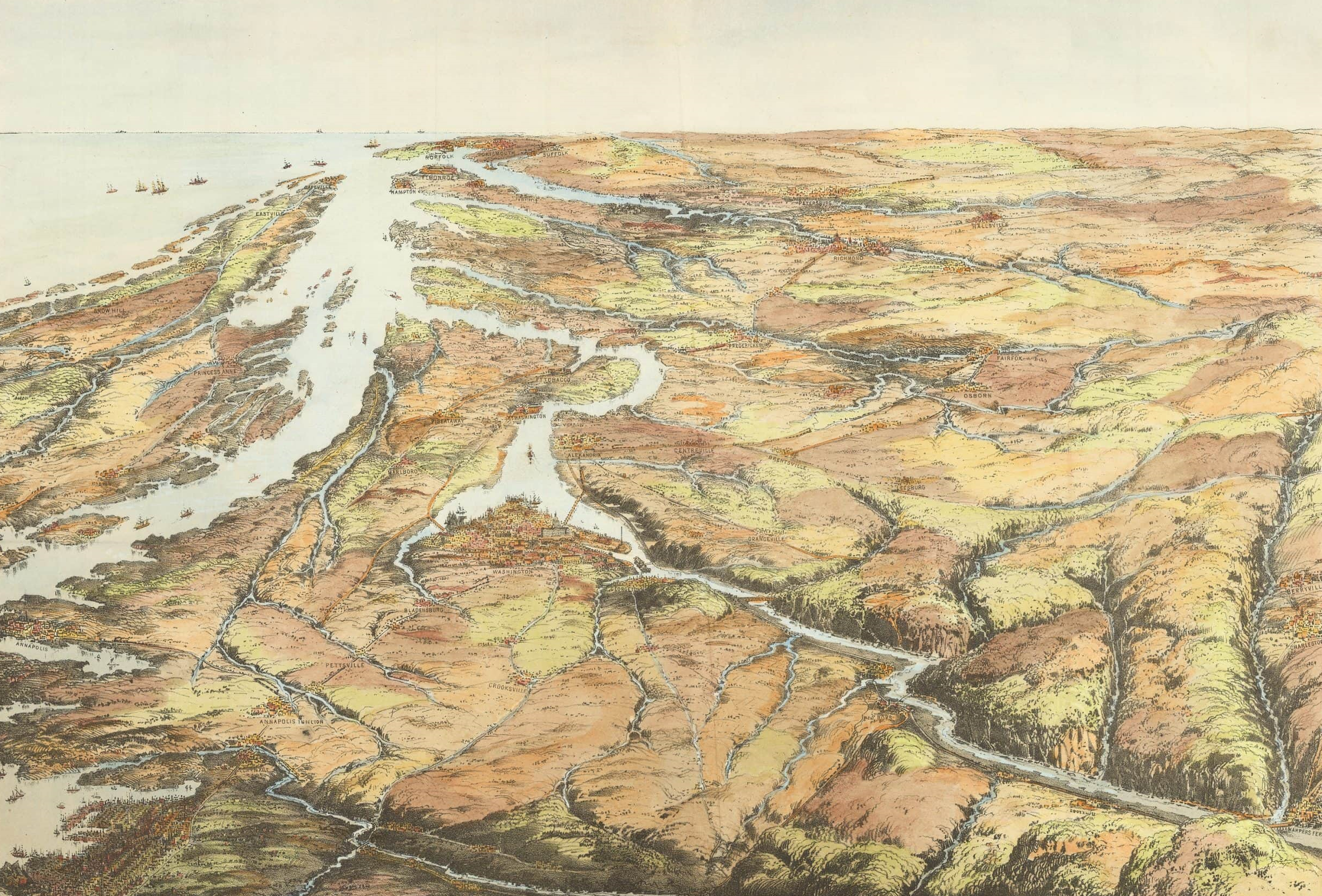
The Tidewater Region, where descendants of Driggus later emigrated from.

According to genealogical analysis by Paul Heinegg, Driggus's free Black descendants migrated to North and South Carolina from Tidewater Virginia. Some also migrated to Maryland, Alabama, and Georgia, a portion being marked white on the census.

The Driggers and Drighouse families in the United States are direct descendants of Emanuel Driggus. The Driggers and Chavis families were allied with the family of Gideon Gibson Sr. in Chowan County. Capt. Winslow Driggers, a direct descendant of Emanuel, led a militia against British strongholds in the Carolinas and was later hanged under the Negro Act.

==== Intermarriage ====
The Driggers family intermarried with the Songo, Sisco, and Consellor families, who also had surnames implying Spanish or Portuguese connections. Centuries later, they had also established communities together with the free African-American Dial, Carter, Harman, Cumbo, Cornish, Sweet, and Gowen families. The surname was later carried by the Melungeons of Appalachia, and the Driggers family was one of the founding families of the Lumbee encountered by English settlers.

== Historical analysis ==
Scholar Rebecca Anne Goetz proposes that the "unusual" life of Driggus is appealing to historians as precedent for a Southern society not based on chattel slavery. However, she suggests his later debt and non-independence, which she implies meant re-enslavement, indicates otherwise. She argues the flexibility experienced by Atlantic Creoles was probably only occurring on the Eastern Shore. Scholar John C. Coombs posits that the life of Driggus and his colleagues led historians to misguided and exaggerated extrapolations. He instead advances the view that planters were maliciously pursuing slavery earlier than historians state they were.

=== Personal ability ===
Goetz suggests Driggus's ability to navigate the local legal environment was informed by his likely early Christian background, and that Pott "protected" Elizabeth and Jane via their indenture, guaranteeing their safety while Driggus could not. Scholar Antonio T. Bly suggests Driggus being literate was due to previous familiarity with Western literacy in Angola. Author John M. Blanton poses Driggus's upbringing in West-Central Africa would have informed his ability to navigate his bound status, allowing him to leverage material resources, kin relationships, and enslaver networks.

=== Position in society ===
Scholar Stephan Palmie comments free Black planters like Driggus seemed to "act outside historical norms", given they acquired slaves and servants, formed patron-client relationships with the gentry, married white women, and litigated cases in court. Historians T.H. Breen and Stephen Innes suggested the questioning Driggus received regarding his livestock revealed he faced the risk of certain Virginians removing his ability to own property. They viewed Driggus and his contemporary Anthony Johnson as members of a "class" of Africans in the Virginia colony who had begun to associate property accumulation with their own future freedom. Scholar Douglas Deal states Breen and Innes placed too much focus on land ownership as a factor determining one's liberty. He noted free Black landowners like Azaricum Driggus existed later on, but still faced struggles in the 18th century. He concluded society changed its relationship with Black people, noting the rise of slave labor affected the status of free Black people in the colony.

== Bibliography ==
- Breen, T.H.; Innes, Stephen (September 16, 2005). "Myne owne ground": Race and Freedom on Virginia's Eastern Shore, 1640-1676 (25th Anniversary ed.). New York: Oxford University Press. ISBN 0-19-517537-9.
- Deal, Joseph Douglas III (1981). Race and Class in Colonial Virginia: Indians, Englishmen, and Africans on the Eastern Shore During the Seventeenth Century. ProQuest (PhD thesis). Rochester, New York: University of Rochester.
- Deal, Joseph Douglas III (1988). "A Constricted World: Free Blacks on Virginia's Eastern Shore, 1680-1750". In Carr, Lois Green; Morgan, Philip D.; Russo, Jean Burrell (eds.). Colonial Chesapeake Society. Chapel Hill, North Carolina: University of North Carolina Press & Omohundro Institute of Early American History and Culture. ISBN 9780807843437.
- Hashaw, Tim (2006). Children of Perdition. Melungeons and the Struggle of Mixed America. Macon, Georgia: Mercer University Press. ISBN 9780881460742.
- Hashaw, Tim (2007). The Birth of Black America: The First African Americans and the Pursuit of Freedom at Jamestown. New York: Carroll & Graf. ISBN 978-0-78671-718-7.
