= Atlantic Creoles =

Ethnic group

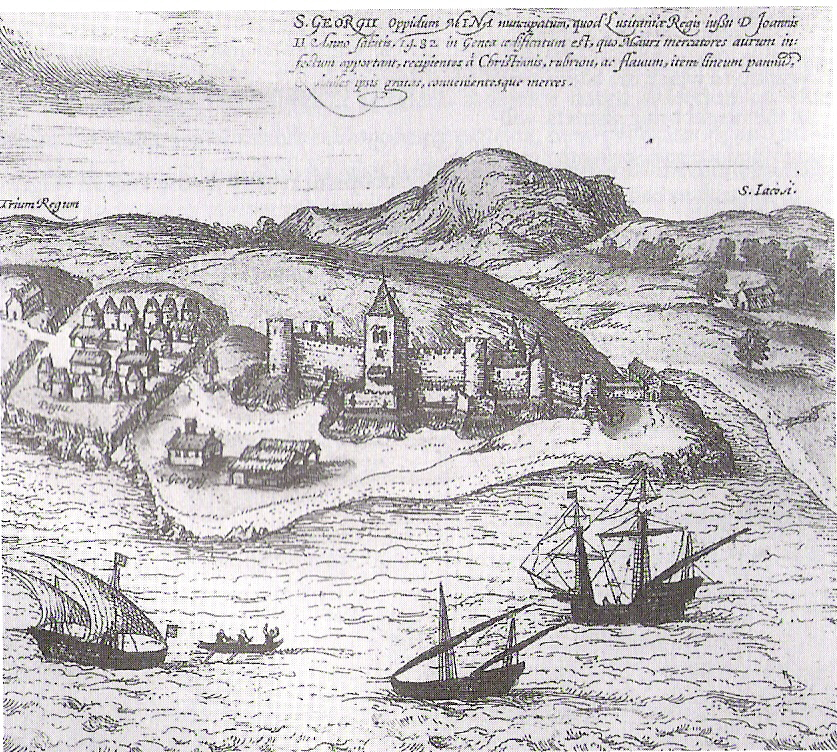
West African Atlantic trading centers like Elmina, pictured here in 1575, had communities of Atlantic Creoles; some ended up in the Americas, both free and captive.

Atlantic Creoles is a term used to describe people of predominately Congolese and Angolan heritage in Africa, the Americas, and Europe during the 16th and 17th centuries who also had ancestral or cultural ties to Europe. Some of these people, from mixed race cosmopolitan communities in West African trading centers, were transported from Africa as the 'Charter Generation' of enslaved people during the Atlantic Slave Trade.

Historians have noted that their exposure to different cultures gave them expert abilities in trading, negotiating and interpreting; and many who arrived in their new homelands as enslaved people managed to win their freedom. Examples of Atlantic Creoles in Colonial America included Anthony Johnson, John Punch and Emanuel Driggus (his surname was possibly derived from Rodriguez). The original Atlantic Creoles of Colonial America eventually assimilated into Black, White, Native and Creole communities in the United States. In Latin America and the Caribbean, they influenced the development of the diverse cultures there Atlantic Creoles and their descendants are known to be multilingual, often speaking the national languages of the countries and creole languages that formed from the fusion of African, European, and Indigenous American languages.

== History ==
Starting in the 15th century, Europeans, mainly the Portuguese, began to settle in regions of Africa such as Nigeria and Angola. Soon an early Atlantic Creole culture began to form with cultural diffusion and admixing occurring. Some of these individuals would travel with Europeans in the exploration, colonization and settlement of the Americas in the late 15th century and early 16th century such as Juan Garrido and Juan Valiente. Later, when more European populations began to establish themselves in Africa and the trans-atlantic slave trade ramped up, genetic, cultural and political admixing took place. In the multicultural trading ports of 16th century West Africa, the Atlantic Creoles were frequently outcasts in both African and European cultures, but they were admired for their abilities to navigate between the two worlds, earning them reputations as expert traders and negotiators. Though their intercultural abilities allowed them to succeed in the changing West African societies, they could also be enslaved when they fell out of official favor or into debt or criminal activity while others were the children of African elites who were sent to Europe to study. These original indentured and enslaved Creoles that experienced forced settlement in the Americas were joined by captive Africans that continued to admix genetically and culturally up to the 19th century which expanded and grew Atlantic Creole culture. With later migrations Atlantic Creole culture can be found throughout the Americas and the world, as Jane Landers notes, the Atlantic Creoles were "merchants, enslavers, linguists, sailors, artisans, musicians, and military figures" who "interacted with a wide variety of European and Amerindian groups and helped shape a new Atlantic world system."

== Atlantic Creoles in the United States ==
The historian Ira Berlin writes that Atlantic Creoles were among what he called the 'Charter Generation' in the Chesapeake Colonies, up until the end of the seventeenth century. Through the first century of settlement, lines were fluid between black and white workers as the color coded caste system didn't solidify until later; they often both worked off passage as indentured servants, and any captives were less set apart than they were later. The working class lived together, and many white women and black men developed relationships. Some of these White Europeans were also captives forced to the colonies as the practice of forcing convicts to the US colonies from Britain was also going on. Many of the new generation of Creoles born in the colonies were the children of European indentured servants and bonded or captive workers of primarily West African ancestry. Amerindian, and Malagasy admixture also occurred up through the 19th Century.

According to the principle of partus sequitur ventrem, incorporated into colonial law in 1662, children born in the colony took the status of the mother; when the mothers were enslaved, the children were born into bondage, regardless of paternity, whether or not their fathers were free or enslaved. This was a change from common law tradition, which had asserted that children took the status of the father. Paul Heinegg and other twentieth-century researchers have found that 80% of the free people of color in the Upper South in colonial times were born to white mothers (thus gaining freedom) and African or Creole fathers. Some male captive Creoles and Africans were freed in the early years as well, but free mothers were the predominant source of most of the free families of color.

According to Berlin, most of the original admixed Atlantic Creoles were descended from Portuguese and Spanish fathers, primarily in the trading ports of West Africa; they had Iberian surnames such as Chavez, Rodriguez, and Francisco. In later generations, they sometimes modified them, resulting in surnames such as Driggers, Chavis, and Chavers. In the Chesapeake Bay Colony, many of the Atlantic Creoles intermarried with their European neighbors, adopted Anglo-Saxon surnames, became property owners and farmers, and captured others in turn. The families became well-established, with numerous free descendants by the time of the American Revolution.

In 2007, Linda Heywood and John Thornton used "newly available data from the DuBois Institute and Cambridge University Press on the trade and transportation of enslaved people" in their new work on the relation of Central Africans to the Atlantic Creoles. They found strong support for Berlin's thesis that the Charter Generations of enslaved Creoles, before 1660, came primarily from West Central Africa.

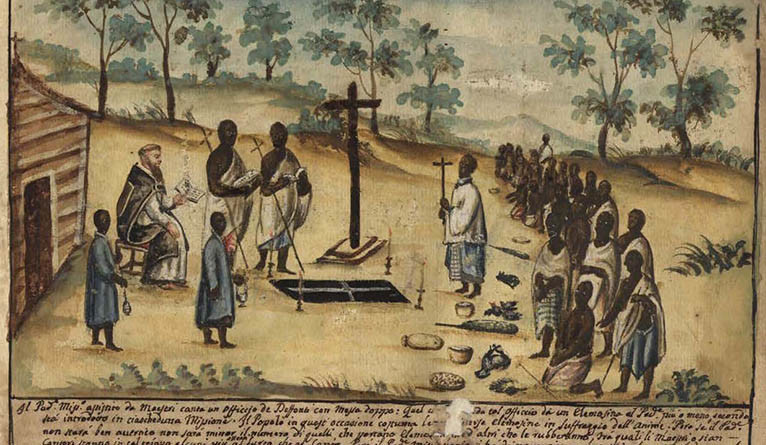
Dasti burial, circa 1750. Many Atlantic Creoles came from the Kingdom of the Kongo and had created an African-Christian spirituality which they brought to the Americas.

They also noted that in the Kingdom of Kongo (northern present-day Angola), the leaders adopted Catholicism in the late 15th century due to Portuguese influence. This led to widespread conversion of the people. They formed a type of African-Catholic spirituality unique to the region, and the people frequently adopted Portuguese names in baptism. The kingdoms were Christian for nearly 400 years and many of their people were taken as captives by the Portuguese. The historians argue that numerous people from Kongo were transported to the North American colonies as captives, especially to South Carolina and Louisiana. Kongolese Catholics led the Stono Rebellion in 1739. Thornton and Heywood estimate that about one in five Creoles are descended from Kongolese ancestors.

Brunelle says that the enslaved Kongolese, rather than the small admixed communities around European trading posts, were the source of most early Atlantic Creoles with Iberian surnames in North America. Many were Christian, were admixed and multi-lingual, and familiar with some aspects of European culture. The Dutch colonies in New York were also populated by numerous enslaved Atlantic Creoles from the Kingdom of Kongo.

=== Regional and ethnic variations ===
==== Tidewater Virginia and Maryland ====
The first Africans in Virginia were from parts of Angola that were settled by the Portuguese since the late 15th century. Many were multilingual and baptized. This creolization is attributed as the possible reason why some were able to gain freedom in colonial Virginia and Maryland. Some of these Creoles were Emmanuel Driggus, Sebastian Cane, John Francisco, and John Graweere.

Another such person was Anthony Johnson who sailed to Virginia in 1621 aboard the James. The Virginia Muster (census) of 1624 lists his name as "Antonio not given," recorded as "a Negro" in the "notes" column. Historians have some dispute as to whether this was the Antonio later known as Anthony Johnson, as the census lists several "Antonios." This one is considered the most likely.

Map of Chavis families, 1790-1830.

Johnson was sold as an indentured servant to a white planter named Bennet to work on his Virginia tobacco farm. (Enslavement laws were not passed until 1661 in Virginia; prior to that date, Africans were not officially considered to be captives). Such workers typically worked under a limited indenture contract for four to seven years to pay off their passage, room, board, lodging, and freedom dues. In the early colonial years, most Africans in the Thirteen Colonies were held under such contracts of limited indentured servitude. With the exception of those indentured for life, they were released after a contracted period. Those who managed to survive their period of indenture would receive land and equipment after their contracts expired or were bought out. Scholar Adam Kulikoff suggests that the period between 1650 and 1690 was when Black people assimilated to white society in Tidewater Virginia and Maryland. He concludes the rise in the Black population during this period resulted in repression by White people, noting several racial laws were passed in Virginia between 1660 and 1686. Philip D. Morgan speculates that by the 1780s, most slaves in the Piedmont were Tidewater Creoles born in Virginia.

==== Gullah region ====
Historically, the Gullah region extended from the Cape Fear area on North Carolina's coast south to the vicinity of Jacksonville on Florida's coast. The Gullah people and their language are also called Geechee, which may be derived from the name of the Ogeechee River near Savannah, Georgia. Gullah is a term that was originally used to designate the creole dialect of English spoken by Gullah and Geechee people. Over time, its speakers have used this term to formally refer to their creole language and distinctive ethnic identity as a people. The Georgia communities are distinguished by identifying as either "Freshwater Geechee" or "Saltwater Geechee", depending on whether they live on the mainland or the Sea Islands.

Because of a period of relative isolation from whites while working on large plantations in rural areas, the Africans, enslaved from a variety of Central and West African ethnic groups, developed a creole culture that has preserved much of their African linguistic and cultural heritage from various peoples; in addition, they absorbed new influences from the region.

==== Melungeons ====
As the Color lines continued to evolve groups of free Creoles and White Europeans began to travel together forming small tribes or clans that didn't fit with the various White, Creole and Black African populations.

Free Creoles are documented as migrating with white European-American neighbors in the first half of the 18th century to the frontiers of Virginia and North Carolina, where they received land grants like their neighbors. For instance, the Collins, Gibson, and Ridley (Riddle) families owned land adjacent to one another in Orange County, North Carolina, where they and the Bunch family were listed in 1755 as "free Molatas (mulattoes)", subject to taxation on tithes. By settling in frontier areas, free people of color found more amenable living conditions and could escape some of the racial strictures of Virginia and North Carolina Tidewater plantation areas.

Historian Jack D. Forbes has discussed laws in South Carolina related to racialized classification:

In 1719, South Carolina decided who should be an "Indian" for tax purposes since American [Indian] slaves were taxed at a lesser rate than African slaves. The act stated: "And for preventing all doubts and scruples that may arise what ought to be rated on mustees, mulattoes, etc. all such slaves as are not entirely Indian shall be accounted as negro.

Forbes said that, at the time, "mustees" and "mulattoes" were terms for persons of part-Native American ancestry. He wrote,

My judgment (to be discussed later) is that a mustee was primarily part-African and American [Indian] and that a mulatto was usually part-European and American [Indian]. The act is also significant because it asserts that part-American [Indians] with or without [emphasis added] African ancestry could be counted as Negroes, thus having an implication for all later slave censuses.

Beginning about 1767, some of the ancestors of the Melungeons reached the frontier New River area, where they are listed in the 1780s on tax lists of Montgomery County, Virginia. From there they migrated south in the Appalachian Range to Wilkes County, North Carolina, where some are listed as "white" on the 1790 census. They resided in a part that became Ashe County, where they are designated as "other free" in 1800.

==== Black Seminoles ====
Seminole Creoles (Black Seminoles) or Afro Seminoles) are descendants of the Seminole people and free or enslaved Creoles who allied with Seminole groups in Spanish Florida.

Historically, the Seminole Creoles lived mostly in distinct bands near the Amerindian Seminole. Some were enslaved, particularly of Seminole leaders, but the Seminole Creoles had more freedom than enslaved Creoles in the South and by other Amerindian tribes.

Today, Creole Seminole descendants live primarily in rural communities around the Seminole Nation of Oklahoma. Its two Freedmen's bands, the Caesar Bruner Band and the Dosar Barkus Band, are represented on the General Council of the Nation. Other centers are in Florida, Texas, the Bahamas, and northern Mexico.

==== American South ====
Those with Atlantic Creole heritage are most concentrated in the Southern US as they have been historically. A Southern Creole accent or dialect is still spoken by many and some historical traditions are still practiced there with cuisine being primary.

==== Western and Northeastern United States ====
Due to the Great Migration Atlantic creole culture spread throughout the United States. A large portion of Atlantic Creole culture was able to become mainstream due to the music culture that sprung up in California and New York mainly via hip hop but also television broadcasting. Some will speak in a Creole accent or dialect mixed with Western US American English, California English and Northeastern English or New York english.

=== Culture ===
==== Cuisine ====
US Atlantic Creole cuisine originated from various US creole populations. The early cuisine originated from the merging of various cooking techniques, recipes, practices and produce from Africa with various European and Amerindian cooking cultures as well as substituting produce and meat indigenous to the Americas. One root of the cuisine also stems from captives transforming less desired food or scraps into a palatable meal in creative or innovate ways. There were also cases of captives or enslaved Creoles working in households and free Creoles homemaking or working various jobs that entailed cooking. Different Creole ethnic groups and populations contributed to distinct cuisine such as Louisiana Creole food and soul food as well as other US American or regional cuisine such as Southern food.

==== Language ====
Since the 1960s, when linguists began describing this language in great detail, it has gone through many name changes based on the social and political times in which it exists. Today most linguists refer to the distinctive speech of African Americans as Black English or African American English (AAE). This language is a result of Atlantic creolization, with its own unique accent, grammar, vocabulary features, and dialects. We can find it spoken by some 30 million native speakers throughout the United States.

US Atlantic Creole or just US Creole, most commonly known as AAVE, was a dialect that formed in the early US. The presiding theory among linguists is that AAVE has always been a dialect of English, meaning that it originated from earlier English dialects rather than from English-based creole languages that "decreolized" back into English. In the early 2000s, Shana Poplack provided corpus-based evidence—evidence from a body of writing—from isolated enclaves in Samaná and Nova Scotia peopled by descendants of migrations of early AAVE-speaking groups (see Samaná English) that suggests that the grammar of early AAVE was closer to that of contemporary British dialects than modern urban AAVE is to other current American dialects, suggesting that the modern language is a result of divergence from mainstream varieties, rather than the result of decreolization from a widespread American Creole.

Linguist John McWhorter maintains that the contribution of West African languages to AAVE is minimal. In an interview on National Public Radio's Talk of the Nation, McWhorter characterized AAVE as a "hybrid of regional dialects of Great Britain that captive people in America were exposed to because they often worked alongside the indentured servants who spoke those dialects..." According to McWhorter, virtually all linguists who have carefully studied the origins of AAVE "agree that the West African connection is quite minor."

However, a creole theory, less accepted among linguists, posits that AAVE arose from one or more creole languages used by African captives of the Middle Passage, due to the captives speaking many different native languages and therefore needing a new way to communicate among themselves and with their captors. According to this theory, these captives first developed what are called pidgins: simplified mixtures of languages. Since pidgins form from close contact between speakers of different languages, the Middle Passage would have been exactly such a situation. Creolist John Dillard quotes, for example, slave ship captain William Smith describing the sheer diversity of mutually unintelligible languages just in The Gambia. By 1715, an African pidgin was reproduced in novels by Daniel Defoe, in particular, The Life of Colonel Jacque. In 1721, Cotton Mather conducted the first attempt at recording the speech of enslaved people in his interviews regarding the practice of smallpox inoculation. By the time of the American Revolution, varieties among enslaved Creoles were not quite mutually intelligible. Dillard quotes a recollection of "slave language" toward the latter part of the 18th century: "Kay, massa, you just leave me, me sit here, great fish jump up into da canoe, here he be, massa, fine fish, massa; me den very grad; den me sit very still, until another great fish jump into de canoe; but me fall asleep, massa, and no wake 'til you come...." Not until the time of the American Civil War did the languages become familiar to a large number of people. The abolitionist papers before the war form a rich corpus of examples of plantation creoles. In Army Life in a Black Regiment (1870), Thomas Wentworth Higginson detailed many features of his Black soldiers' language. Distinct cultural dialects formed including Gullah, Louisiana Creole, and Seminole Creole and regional dialects formed as well.

==== Music ====
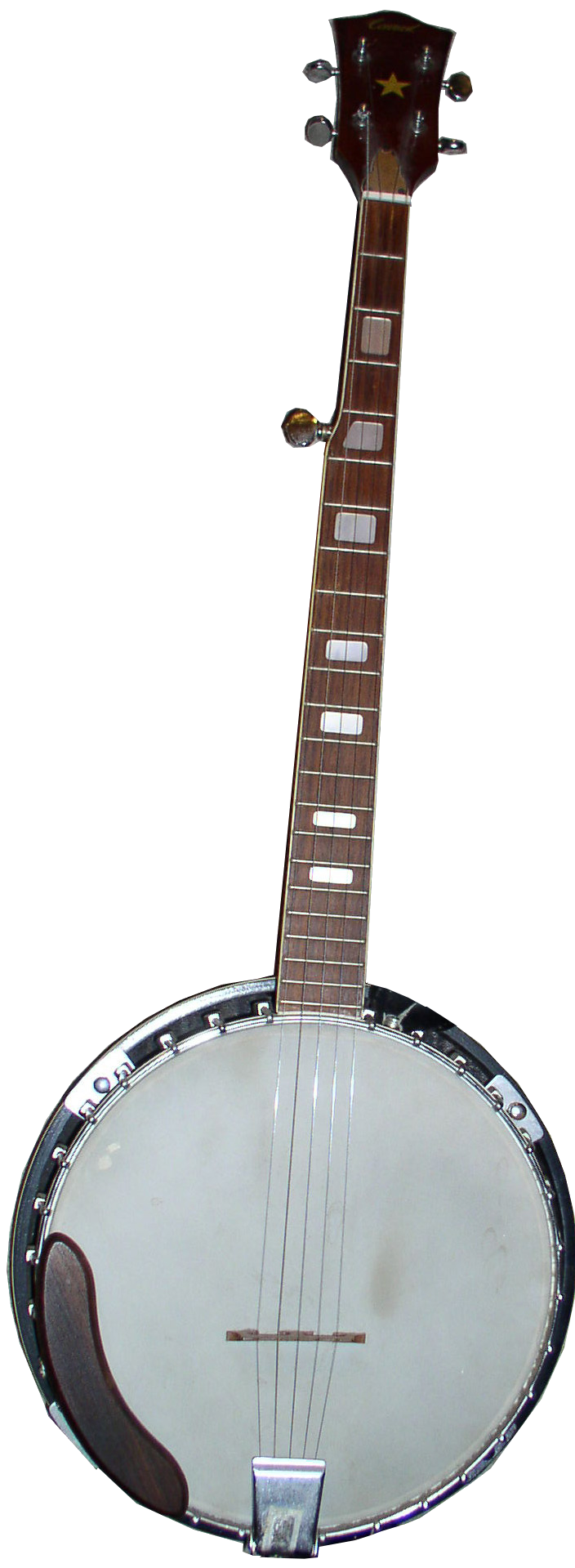
The banjo could be considered an Atlantic Creole instrument, with its roots in an African instrument and European crafting.

Dozens of music genres and their subsequent subcultures originated or partly originated from US Atlantic Creole culture including pop, rap, country, hip hop, EDM, rock and jazz. Many of these genres originate from early genres that were a blend of musical cultures from Africa, Europe and the Americas such as spirituals and blue grass. In the 20th century ragtime, the blues, and jazz would originate from Atlantic Creole culture.

Encompassing the earliest folk traditions to present day popular music "Africans brought their own cultures and way of life to the Americas. As enslaved Africans they participated in African rituals and music-making events. They told stories, sang, danced, played African and African-derived instruments, and more broadly, celebrated life as they had done in Africa. In North America, their introduction to European culture and music came from participating in or witnessing the religious and social activities of slaveholders, which they reinterpreted to conform to their own cultural practices and musical values through processes of adaption and resistance. As freed people, Blacks and their descendants continued to create new and distinctive styles of Black music in the tradition of African music-making that defined their unique African-American identity."

US Creole music speaks directly to the experience of African-American people, showing us the duality of both African and American identities, as well as their perseverance, which continues to shape their music today.

==== Religion and spiritual practices ====
Louisiana Voodoo (French: Vaudou louisianais), also known as New Orleans Voodoo, is an Atlantic Creole religion that originated in Louisiana, now in the southern United States. It arose through a process of syncretism between the traditional religions of West Africa, the Roman Catholic form of Christianity, and Haitian Vodou. No central authority is in control of Louisiana Voodoo, which is organized through autonomous groups.

Hoodoo is a set of spiritual practices, traditions, and beliefs which were created and concealed by Atlantic Creoles in North America. Hoodoo evolved from various traditional African religions and practices, and, in the American South, incorporated various elements of American botanical knowledge. Hoodoo is Creole tradition created during the time of enslavement in the United States and is an esoteric system of Creole occultism. Many of the practices are similar to those of other African Diaspora traditions, as the practices come from the Bakongo people in Central Africa. During the transatlantic slave trade, about 40 percent of Africans taken to the United States were Bantu-Kongo. Hoodoo is a syncretic spiritual system that combines Christianity, Islam brought over by enslaved West African Muslims, and Spiritualism. Practitioners of Hoodoo are called rootworkers, conjure doctors, conjure men, conjure women, root doctors, Hoodoo doctors, and swampers. Regional synonyms for Hoodoo include conjure and rootwork.

Creoles historically could be found in various Christian and Islamic denominations, their houses of worship typically segregated from White-identified populations, though some White-passing Creoles could be found in either.

== Atlantic Creoles in Canada ==
Atlantic Creoles arrived in Canada in several waves. The first of these came as free persons serving in the French Army and Navy, though some were enslaved people or indentured servants. About 1,000 captive Creoles were brought to New France in the 17th and 18th centuries. After the American Revolutionary War, over 2000 indentured servants arrived to what was to become Quebec and Ontario. At the same time, approximately 3,500 free Black persons emigrated from the US and settled in what became Nova Scotia and New Brunswick. These Black Loyalists had won their freedom due to their support for Britain during the American Revolution. In 1792, about 1200 of the resettled Black Loyalist emigrated to West Africa and founded a new colony, where their descendants identified as the Sierra Leone Creoles.

Another group of over 800 free Black people from California migrated to Vancouver Island between 1858 and 1860. Many Creoles migrated to Canada in search of work and became porters with the railroad companies in Ontario, Quebec, and the Western provinces or worked in mines in the Maritimes. Between 1909 and 1911 over 1500 migrated from Oklahoma as farmers and moved to Manitoba, Saskatchewan, and Alberta.

== Atlantic Creoles in the Caribbean ==
Starting in the early 16th century the Modern colonization and settlement of the Caribbean began. Modern European and African cultures began to mix with the established Amerindian cultures. Later settlers from India and China would also contribute to the growing Caribbean Creole culture.

Caribbean Creole cuisine is a fusion of West African, Amerindian, East Asian, Arab, South Asian and British cuisines.

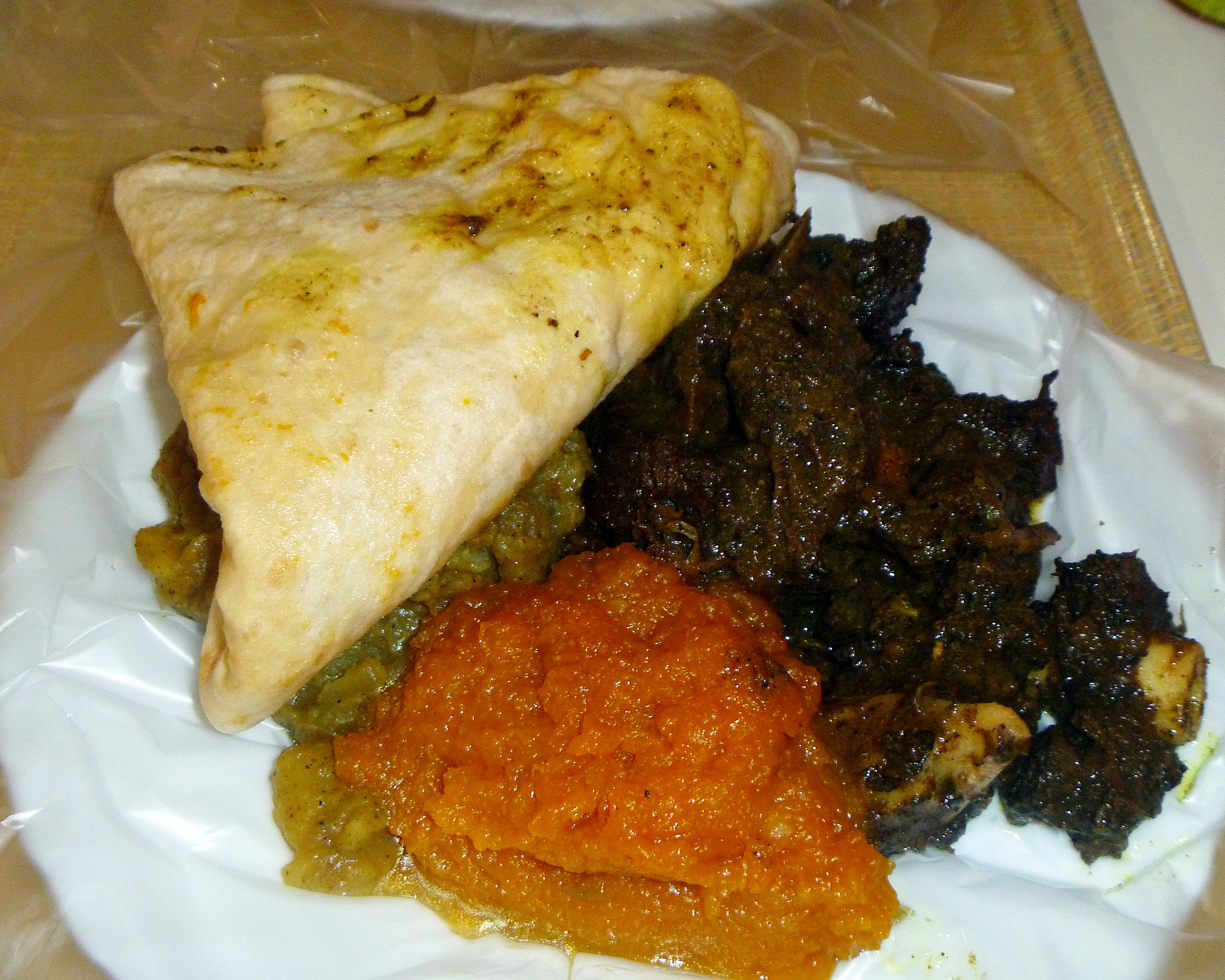
Dhalpurie roti, pumpkin tarkari, channa and aloo, and curry goat, from Trinidad and Tobago

Ingredients that are common in most islands' dishes are rice, plantains, beans, cassava, cilantro, bell peppers, chickpeas, tomatoes, sweet potatoes, coconut, and any of various meats that are locally available like beef, poultry, pork or fish. A characteristic seasoning for the region is a green herb-and-oil-based marinade called sofrito, which imparts a flavor profile which is quintessentially Caribbean in character. Ingredients may include garlic, onions, scotch bonnet peppers, celery, green onions, and herbs like cilantro, Mexican mint, chives, marjoram, rosemary, tarragon and thyme. This green seasoning is used for a variety of dishes like curries, stews and roasted meats.

Caribbean music genres are diverse and are each syntheses of African, European, Indian and Amerindian influences. Some of the styles to gain wide popularity outside the Caribbean include, bachata, merenque, palo, mambo, denbo, baithak gana, bouyon, cadence-lypso, calypso, chutney, chutney-soca, compas, dancehall, jing ping, parang, pichakaree, punta, ragga, reggae, reggaeton, salsa, soca, and zouk. Caribbean music is also related to Central American and South American music.

Several spiritual traditions also formed from Creole culture, such as Santeria, Palo, and Obeah, and some religions such as Rastafari.

Dialect, Kreyòl, Kriol, Kweyol and Patois also refer to the creole languages in the Caribbean, including Antillean French Creole, Bajan Creole, Bahamian Creole, and Belizean Creole, among others.

== See also ==
- Africanisms
- Angolan Americans
- Angola, Delaware
- Atlantic World
- Atlantic history
- Biography and the Black Atlantic
- Chesapeake Colonies
- Children of the plantation
- Colonial South and the Chesapeake
- Gullah
- Jamaican Maroon Creole
- Kingdom of Ndongo
- Maroons
- Portuguese Angola
- Seasoning (slavery)
- The Black Atlantic
- Tobacco colonies
- Transatlantic migrations
