= Peter Crosby =

Peter Crosby may refer to:

- Peter Crosby (clergy), Canadian clergy, Archdeacon of Ottawa
- Peter Crosby (sheriff) (1844–1884), American sheriff and treasurer in Warren County, Mississippi, U.S.
