= Chavis family =

Family of free African-American origin from the colony of Virginia

Chavis (United States)
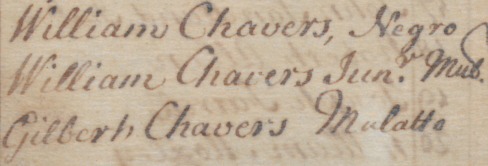
- Chavis family members listed in muster roll, 1754
- Current region: United States
- Origin: Colony of Virginia

The Chavis family is a family of free African-American origin from the Colony of Virginia. They migrated further into the United States, becoming part of early African-American kinship networks and settlements in the Antebellum South. Passing down skills and land inheritances within the free Black community, some members became part of the historic African-American upper class, and their contributions were extolled by scholars.

Later descendants were sometimes documented in anthropological reports as mixed-race people. In modern times, the Chavis family is represented among African-American families in the USA, and have been recorded in multiple recent family histories.

== History ==
The Chavis family has been documented as originating in the 17th century, from free African-Americans in colonial Tidewater Virginia. Alternate spellings of the surname are "Chavous" and "Chavers".

=== Colonial era ===
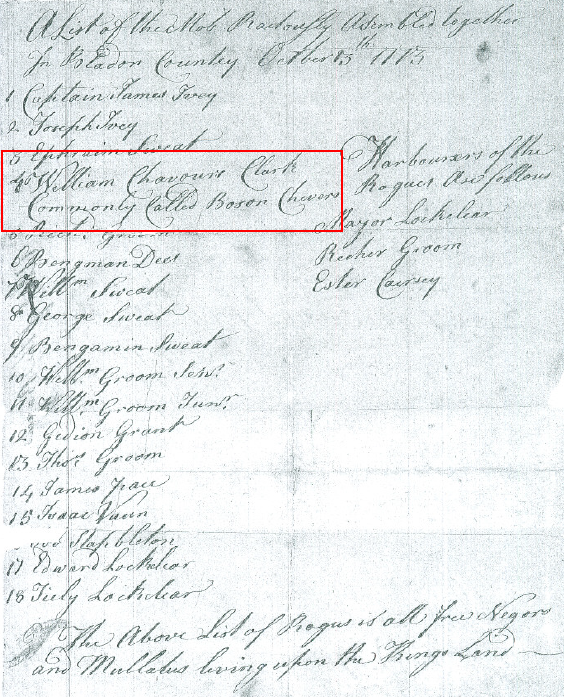
List of free African-Americans in Bladen County, 1773. William Chavours Clark is highlighted.

In 1672, Elizabeth Chavis successfully won the freedom of her son, Gibby Gibson, under the doctrine of partus sequitur ventrem. She was a free Black woman residing near historic Jamestown. Her other son, Hubbard, was the progenitor of the Gibson family of free African-Americans. By the 1750s, free members of the Chavis family resided in multiple counties of Virginia and the Carolinas. William Chavis and his son were recorded on a Granville County muster roll in 1754, labelled Black and "mulatto" respectively. Both owned over 1000 acres of land each, with William also possessing a lodging house and eight slaves. The Chavis family was present in historic Bladen County classified as "mulattoes" in 1768, one member later being listed as part of a group of "free Negors and Mullatus [sic] living upon the Kings land." in 1773.

=== Antebellum ===

The Chavis family settled in Wilkes County during the 1790s, where some are buried in the Harris cemetery, named after another free African-American family. They were among the first settlers on the frontier of South Carolina between 1790 and 1810, many migrating from Virginia and North Carolina. The family was documented on the 1810 United States census, having 46 members in Virginia, 159 in North Carolina, and 12 in South Carolina.

During the 1820s, members of the Chavis family were documented not paying taxes in Richland District; the surname was later prevalent in the area within a mixed-race group known as the "sandhillers". The district sheriff requested amnesty from acquiring their tax payments, stating they were difficult to find due to living remotely. Members of the family also settled in the western part of Greenfield Township, Ohio in the 1840s. They formed a farming community known as "Poke Patch" with other free Black families originating in Virginia. One member, named William Chavis, was a local conductor on the Underground Railroad.

Another group of Chavises migrated with other free Black families to Lost Creek Township, Indiana, after sending a man to locate an area to settle in that was free from racial persecution. They established a schoolhouse for free Black people and an African Methodist Episcopal church in the area. Locust Grove, a free Black community in south Illinois, was also known to have members of the Chavis family residing there. Group intermarriage was common among families like the Chavises, due to a lack of prospects within the upper-class free colored community as they could not marry whites or slaves. The contributions of the Antebellum-era Chavis family were lauded by Daniel Murray, an African-American bibliographer.

Before the Civil War, networks of kinship formed between the Chavis family and other free Black families in the counties of Robeson and Granville. Each new generation inherited property and trade skills. Chavis family migrants from the counties of Granville, Person, and Wake settled in Durham County. There they formed similar networks of kinship, some possessing trade skills such as blacksmithing and milling. Some members of the family participated in the Robeson County Lowry War against the Confederates. A subset of the family was able to pass as white.

==== John Chavis ====
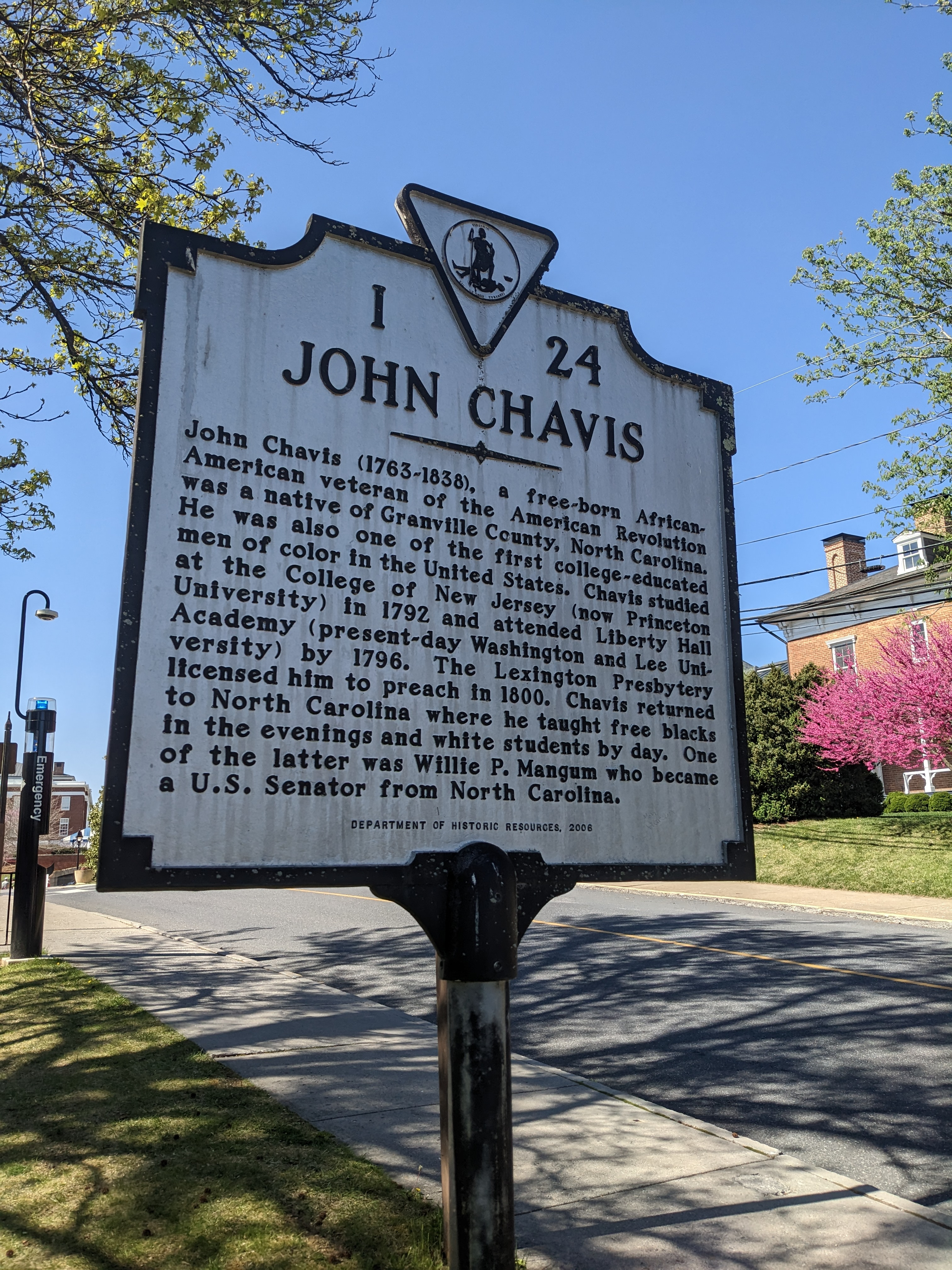
Historical marker honoring John Chavis.

Since the Chavis family was legally free, John Chavis, born 1763 in Granville County, was able to attend college and became the first African-American to do so in the United States. He graduated from Washington and Lee University with high honors in 1801, later returning to North Carolina in 1808 to found a school. His school taught the children of slaveowners, as well as Black people, both free and enslaved. He later became a dedicated opponent of slavery and civil rights leader in the American South. He was a Presbyterian missionary, but was banned from preaching after Nat Turner's Rebellion.

=== Reconstruction ===
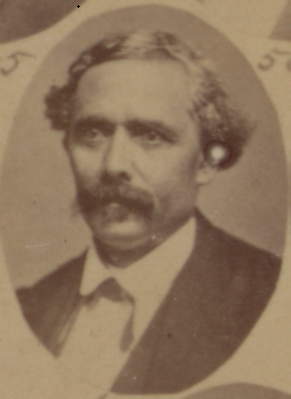
State legislator George Washington Chavis.

In 1873, George Washington Chavis, a member of the Chavis family, was elected to Mississippi's Reconstruction legislature. His family had previously fled Mississippi to Arkansas in 1859, due to a law requiring they leave or be sold into slavery. His son Calvin was deputy sheriff of Warren County, and witnessed a white mob intimidate sheriff Peter Crosby into resigning at the Old Warren County Courthouse, setting the stage for the later Vicksburg Massacre. Calvin was later replaced with a white deputy, who fatally shot Crosby.

=== Jim Crow era ===
During the Jim Crow era, Chavis became a prominent surname among mixed-race groups known as "triracial isolates", such as Melungeons, Redbones, Brass Ankles and the "Croatans". In some cases, these groups would simply be referred to as "Chavises", rather than by a specific name. The surname was also reported as belonging to unspecified mixed-race people in Orangeburg County. In the 20th century, the Chavis family moved into northern states like Ohio, occupying positions of prominence in the 20th century.

== Modern descendants ==
As Presbyterian family networks began to break up in white congregations, they persisted in African-American ones. From 1940 to 1970, a branch of the Chavis family remained in a network of intermarriage with the Richardson, Chisolm, Watson, Smalls, Whaley, Brown, and Middleton families attending Saint James Presbyterian in South Carolina. Similar networks were seen in other Black Presbyterian churches in the state. The Chavis family in Boston, a branch of the family in Richmond, Virginia, originates from North Carolina.

In 2006, a century-old Chavis family cemetery was disturbed by a subdivision expansion in northern Wake County, to the complaint of descendants.

Later generations of the Chavis family served in the NAACP, such as Benjamin Chavis Jr. and his parents, who were descendants of John Chavis. Benjamin's sister, Helen Chavis Othow, wrote a biography on John Chavis, after finding his unmarked grave. Margaret Jones Bolsterli, a white descendant of George Washington Chavis, wrote a Chavis family history in 2015. A 2017 documentary on African-American family histories covered the Chavis family in the counties of Sampson, Duplin, Pender, New Hanover, and Columbus in North Carolina.

== See also ==
- African-American genealogy
- African Americans in Virginia
- African-American upper class (Historic)
- Ashworth family
- Black elite (United States)
- Black Southerners
- Blackwell Family of Virginia
- Bunch family
- Chavous
- Dominickers
- Free Black people
- Gibson family (Virginia)
- Healy family
- Hemings family
- Kevin P. Chavous
- P.W. Chavers
- Quander family
- Syphax family
