= Sango =

Sango may refer to:

== Ethnicities and languages ==
- Sango people, an ethnic group of the Central African Republic
- Sango language, a language of the Central African Republic

== Places ==
- Sango Bay, a settlement in Uganda
- Sangō, Nara, a town in Nara Prefecture, Japan
- Sango, Zimbabwe, a town in Zimbabwe
- Sango Pond, site of Natuashish, Newfoundland and Labrador
- The local name for the town within the Eidghah valley of Pakistan

== Other ==
- Sangō a kind of Buddhist temple
- Sango or Shango, a Yoruba thunder god
- Sango (film), a 1997 Nigerian film
- Sango Fighter, a video game series
- Sango (musician), an electronic musician and DJ from Seattle, Washington
- Sango (InuYasha), a character in the manga and anime Inuyasha
- Sango (ToHeart2), one of the Himeyuri twins in the game ToHeart2
- Sango Suzumura, a.k.a. Cure Coral, a character in the anime series Tropical-Rouge! Pretty Cure
- Bintou Sango, Burkina Faso politician
- Hakka hill song, also known as sango in the Hakka language

== See also ==
- Sangu (disambiguation)
- Songo (disambiguation)
