= Tigerville =

Tigerville may refer to:

- Tigerville, Louisiana
- Tigerville, South Carolina
- Tigerville, South Dakota
- Tigerville, California
