= Songo =

Songo may refer to:

- Songo music, a type of contemporary Cuban music originating in Havana
- Songo people, of northern Angola
- Songo (surname), a surname in Africa
- Songo-salsa, a style of music that blends Spanish rapping and hip hop beats with salsa music and songo
- Songo.mn, an on-demand delivery service in Mongolia

== Places ==
- Songo (Bolivia), Songo, or Zongo: a locality in Bolivia
- Songo, Angola, a town and municipality in Uíge Province in Angola
- Songo, Mozambique, a town next to the Cahora Bassa lake in Tete Province in central Mozambique
- Songo, Burkina Faso, a town in the Zabré Department of Boulgou Province in south-eastern Burkina Faso
- Songo-Doubacore, a commune in the Cercle of Koutiala in the Sikasso Region of southern Mali
- Songo – La Maya, a municipality in Santiago de Cuba Province, Cuba
- Songo Mnara, a historic Swahili settlement in Tanzania

== See also ==
- Sango (disambiguation)
