= Chavis =

Chavis is a name. Notable uses of the name include:

== People ==
=== Surname ===
- Ben Chavis (educator), American educator and controversial education reform advocate
- Benjamin Chavis (born 1948), African-American civil rights activist
- Boozoo Chavis (1930–2001), American musician
- Denis Chavis (fl. 1780s), Syrian priest and monk
- Chris Chavis, American professional wrestler best known by the ring name Tatanka
- George Washington Chavis (c. 1817 – after 1880), American free man of color who served in the Mississippi Legislature
- John Chavis (c. 1763–1838), American educator and minister
- John Chavis (American football) (born 1956), American football coach
- Kory Chavis (fl. 2005–2008), American wrestler also known by the ring name Rainman
- Lazarus Chavis (born 1756), progenitor of the Beaver Creek Indians
- Lonnie Chavis (born 2007), American actor and activist
- Michael Chavis (born 1995), American baseball player

=== Given name ===
- Chavis Carter (died 2012), American man who died in police custody, later ruled a suicide
- Chavis Holmes (born 1986), American basketball player
- Chavis Williams (born 1989), American gridiron football coach and former player

=== Middle name ===
- Angel Joy Chavis Rocker (1966–2003), American politician and guidance counselor

== Other uses ==
- Boozoo Chavis, eponymous album by the above noted American musician
- John Chavis Memorial Park, a public park in North Carolina named for the above noted American educator and minister
- The Chavis family, family of free African-American origin from the Colony of Virginia
