= Randall L. Gibson =

American politician (1832–1892)

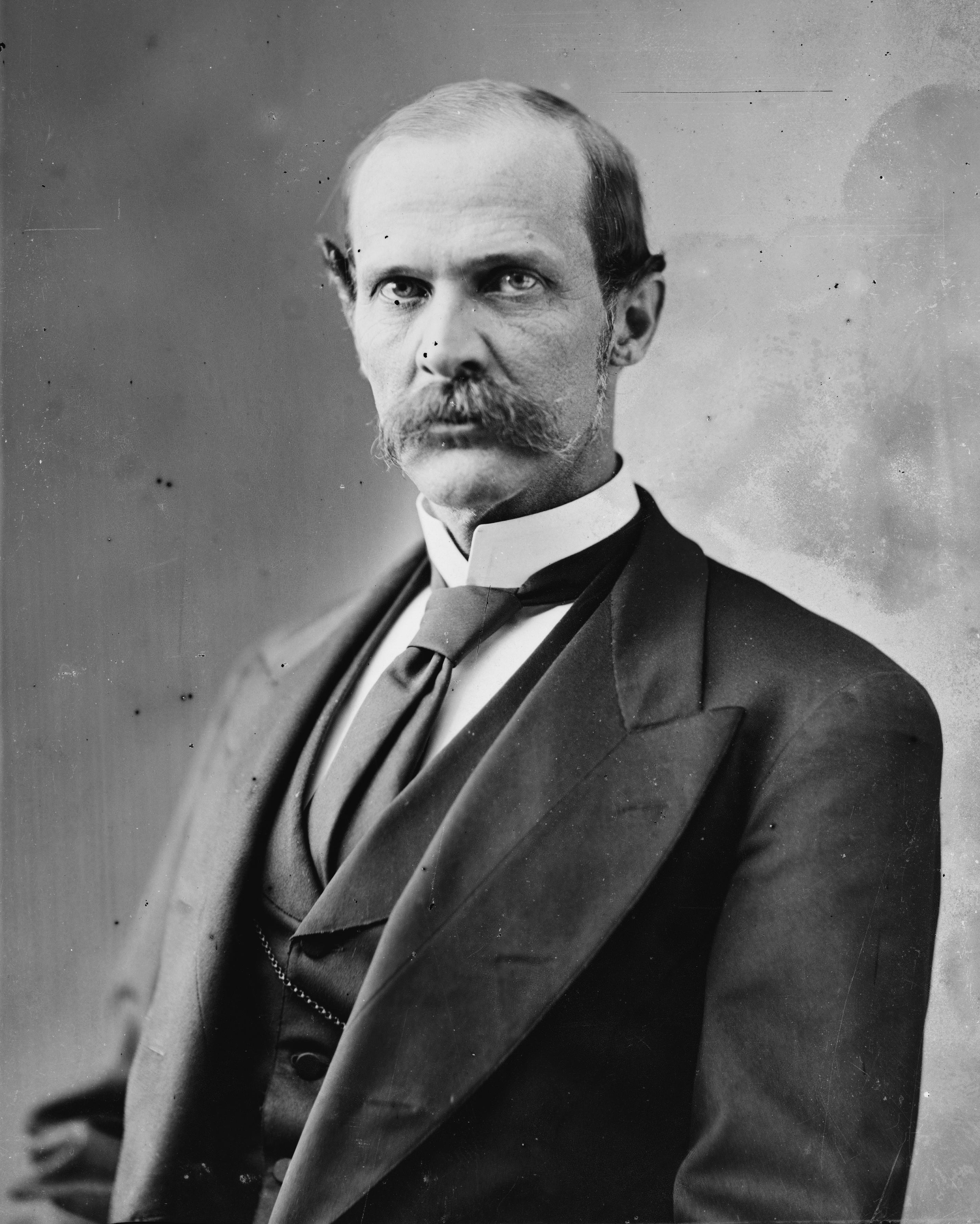
- Gibson, 1870–1880
- In office March 4, 1883 – December 15, 1892
- Preceded by: William P. Kellogg
- Succeeded by: Donelson Caffery

Member of the U.S. House of Representatives from Louisiana's 1st district
- In office March 4, 1875 – March 3, 1883
- Preceded by: Effingham Lawrence
- Succeeded by: Carleton Hunt

Personal details
- Born: September 10, 1832 Versailles, Kentucky, U.S.
- Died: December 15, 1892 (aged 60) Hot Springs, Arkansas, U.S.
- Party: Democratic
- Education: Yale University

Military service
- Allegiance: Confederate States of America
- Branch/service: Confederate States Army
- Years of service: 1861–1865
- Rank: Brigadier General
- Battles/wars: American Civil War

Randall Lee Gibson (September 10, 1832 – December 15, 1892) was an American attorney and politician, elected as a member of the House of Representatives and U.S. senator from Louisiana. He served as a brigadier general in the Confederate States Army. Later he was a regent of the Smithsonian Institution, and a president of the board of administrators of Tulane University.

== Early life ==
Gibson was born in 1832 at "Spring Hill", Versailles, Kentucky, the son of Tobias Gibson, a planter and slaveholder. His mother was from a slaveholding family in Lexington, Kentucky. His paternal great-grandfather was Gideon Gibson Jr., a free man of color who was likely born in the colony of South Carolina in 1731.

Gibson's father moved his family to Louisiana when Randall was a child, where the youth was educated in local academies. He went to college in the North, graduating from Yale University in 1853, where he was a member of the Skull and Bones society. He returned to Louisiana to study for his bachelor of laws (LL.B) from the University of Louisiana Law School, later Tulane University.

== Civil War ==
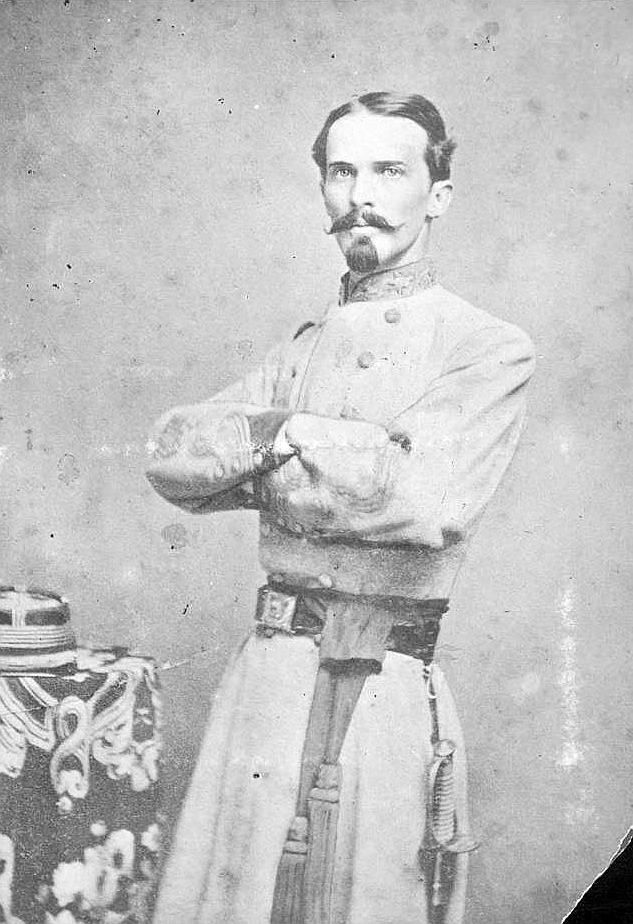
c. 1860

Soon after the Louisiana's secession from the Union, Gibson became an aide to Gov. Thomas O. Moore. On May 8, 1861, he left Frankfort to join the 1st Louisiana Artillery as a captain.

On August 13, 1861, he was commissioned as colonel of the 13th Louisiana Infantry. Gibson fought at the Battle of Shiloh and subsequent actions. With the Army of the Mississippi, he took part in the 1862 Kentucky Campaign and the Battle of Chickamauga. After being promoted to brigadier general (special) on January 11, 1864, he fought in the Atlanta campaign and the Franklin-Nashville Campaign; he next was assigned to the defense of Mobile, Alabama. He inspired his troops to hold Spanish Fort, which was under siege, until the last moment, after which they escaped at night on April 8, 1865. Gibson was captured at Cuba Station, Alabama on May 8, 1865 and paroled at Meridian, Mississippi on May 14, 1865. He was pardoned on September 25, 1866.

== Postbellum career ==
In 1874, Gibson was elected as a Democrat in the United States House of Representatives, being re-elected and serving from March 4, 1875, until March 3, 1883. He promoted the creation of the United States House Committee on the Mississippi Levees on December 10, 1875, to investigate the state of Mississippi levees and gain federal support for their building and repair, issues he persuaded his fellows were in the national interest because of the importance of the Mississippi, its trade, and the region's agriculture. The committee's name was changed to the Levees and Improvements of the Mississippi River on November 7, 1877.

In 1882, Gibson was elected by the Louisiana state legislature (as was the procedure at the time) as United States Senator, serving from March 4, 1883, until his death on December 15, 1892.

=== Accusations surrounding whiteness ===
According to historian Daniel J. Sharfstein in The Invisible Line: Three American Families and the Secret Journey From Black to White (2011), during these years a political opponent challenged Gibson's status as a white man, based on records. Gibson investigated but learned only that his ancestors were property owners, which was "enough to satisfy most of Gibson's contemporaries."

"Such status," Sharfstein explains, "could not mean anything but whiteness. ... As much as racial purity mattered to white Southerners, they had to circle the wagons around Randall Gibson. If someone of his position could not be secure in his race, then no one was safe."

His great-great-grandfather, Gideon Gibson, was a free man of color who was married to a white woman, and had owned land and a few slaves in Virginia (likely where he was born) and North Carolina, before migrating with other settlers to South Carolina in the 1730s. The government was worried that he might provoke a slave revolt and the colonial governor had an interview with him. Learning about his life, the governor declared him a free man with all privileges, and granted him land.

Sharfstein claims that Gibson's paternal line went back to freed African slaves in colonial Virginia.

=== Death ===
Randall Gibson died as a United States senator while in Hot Springs, Arkansas. His body was returned to Kentucky, where he was buried at Lexington Cemetery in Lexington, Kentucky. He was a member of The Boston Club of New Orleans.

== In memoriam ==
Gibson Hall on the campus of Tulane University is named for Senator Gibson, who was instrumental after the war in helping fund and continue the public University of Louisiana as the private Tulane University of Louisiana. The town of Tigerville in Terrebonne Parish was renamed Gibson, Louisiana in his honor.

== See also ==
- Gibson family (Virginia)
- List of American Civil War generals (Confederate)
- List of members of the United States Congress who died in office (1790–1899)

== Notes ==
U.S. House of Representatives
Preceded by Effingham Lawrence	Member of the U.S. House of Representatives from Louisiana's 1st congressional district 1875–1883	Succeeded by Carleton Hunt
U.S. Senate
Preceded by William P. Kellogg	U.S. senator (Class 2) from Louisiana; 1883–1892; Served alongside: Benjamin F. Jonas, James B. Eustis, Edward D. White	Succeeded by Donelson Caffery
