= Gibson Methodist Episcopal Church =

Historic church in Louisiana, United States

- U.S. National Register of Historic Places
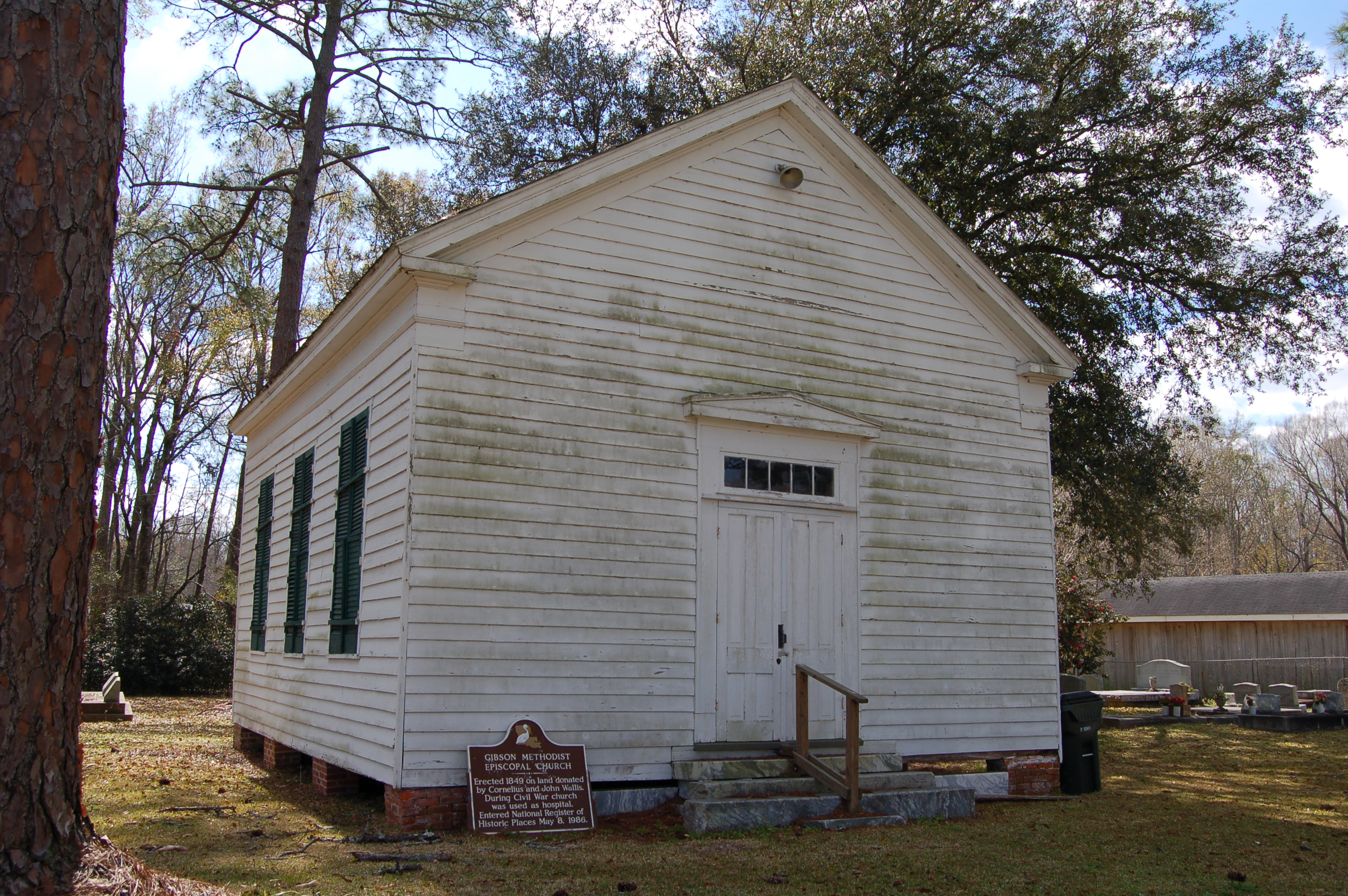

- Location within Louisiana Location within the United States
- Location: S. Bayou Black Dr., Gibson, Louisiana
- Coordinates: 29°41′6″N 90°59′16″W
- Area: 0.2 acres (0.081 ha)
- Built: 1849
- Architectural style: Greek Revival
- NRHP reference No.: 86001032
- Added to NRHP: May 8, 1986

Gibson Methodist Episcopal Church is a historic church on S. Bayou Black Drive in Gibson, Louisiana. It was built in 1849 and added to the National Register of Historic Places in 1986.

== History ==
On May 17, 1849, land was donated in Tigerville, Louisiana (now formally known as Gibson) by Cornelius C. Wallis and John Wallis. They donated this land to the Methodists for the construction of a cemetery and a Church. The church took approximately six months to build and was completely built by the end of the year. This church turned out to be the simplest and smallest church of the surrounding areas of Tigerville, Thibodaux, and Houma. At the time, it was known as the Sycamore Church because of the sycamore trees that grew in the yard. The common style during this time and the style of this church is a variation of the Greek Revival Style. Tobias Gibson, William Thompson, and John McIntyre were a few of the original members of the church.

Tobias Gibson and his wife moved from Kentucky to Louisiana in the 1850s. Tobias owned Plantations named Holly Wood, Live Oak, and Oak Forest near Tigerville, Louisiana. They had eight children, but one child in particular was more eminent. His name is Randall Lee Gibson and he served in the United States Senate and the United States House of Representatives. Randall conducted all his business in French including owning a Plantation in Lafourche Parish and practicing law in Thibodaux, Louisiana. Also, it was he who requested Tigerville, Louisiana be changed to Gibson, Louisiana in 1859.

== Greek revival architecture ==
The South was successful in adapting existing styles rather than developing their own distinctive style. During the colonial times, it was the Georgian style that really took hold until the Greek Revival Style came into favor in the 1830s. Yet, often there are houses who show traces of the Georgian influences. However, the earliest example of Greek Revival Styling was built in Philadelphia in 1798 which was the Latrobe's Bank of Pennsylvania. The Greek Styling did not reach the Deep South till the very last.

However, once it reached the United States, fine stone was no longer used. Instead deTocqueville's materials, “painted wood” and “white washed bricks” were used. Greek Revival Architecture was associated with the “white columned look” in Greece, but that did was not common in Louisiana. In certain southern states, including Louisiana, the Greek Revival looked different from popular Greek temples found elsewhere in the United States. However, the most common are buildings in “the peripteral mode,” the galleried cottage and the double gallery house.

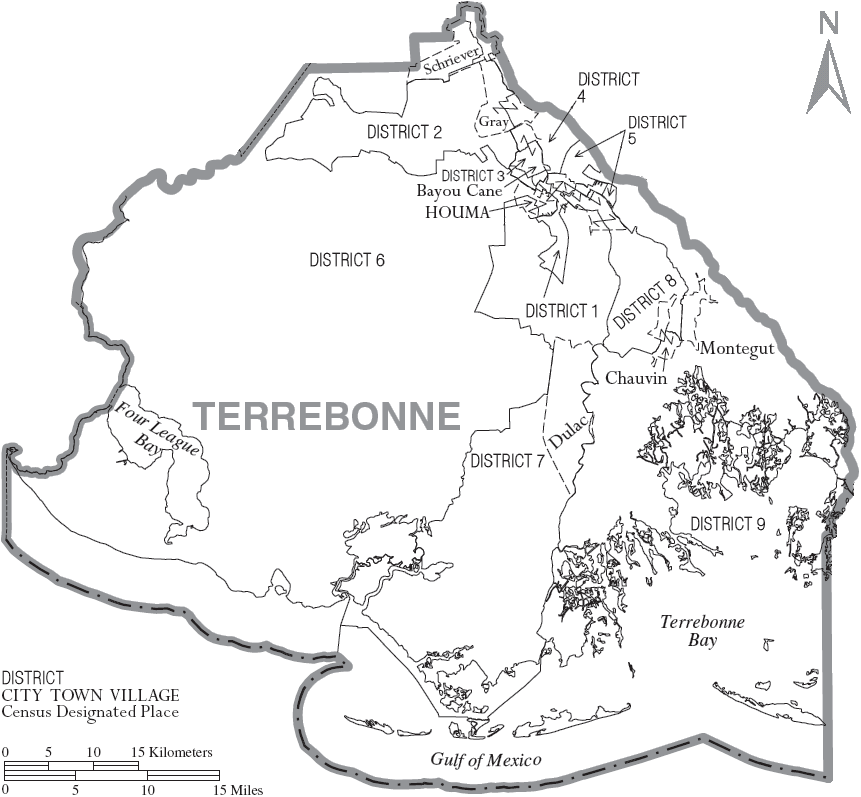

== See also ==
- St. Matthew's Episcopal Church: formerly NRHP-listed in Terrebonne Parish
- National Register of Historic Places listings in Terrebonne Parish, Louisiana
