= Gideon Gibson Jr. =

Free man of colour and enslaver

Gideon Gibson Jr., (c. 1721–1792) was a free man of color in the colony of South Carolina. Gibson became an enslaver and "regulator" in the backcountry. Gibson supported their vigilantism to oppose British taxation policy.

In May 2011, Gibson was discussed in the New York Times as a paternal great-grandfather of Randall Lee Gibson, a planter who served as a Confederate general from Louisiana. The senior Gibson was an example of mixed-race people who succeeded economically and, over several generations, moved into white society.

== Genealogy ==
1695: Gideon Gibson Sr. was born in Boston as a free man of color. Gibson later married a white woman and had children. His profession was carpentry. Their son, Gideon Gibson Jr., was born around 1721.

1730s: Gideon Gibson and his family and other settlers leave Boston and travel south to settle in parts of the frontier. They eventually settle in the area that would become North Carolina.

== Vigilantes ==
1750s: Gibson became a prominent landowner in the area and is known for his success in farming and trading. Some shareholders have abandoned their lands along the Santee River and depend on raiding other farms for sustenance. The farmers reach out to Charleston for help with the raiders, but it is too far, and no help is coming from the Royal Governor. As a result, they band together in vigilante bands, capturing raiders and issuing public whippings. Various Tax acts by the provincial government were the cause of property abandonments and the outlaw status of the raiders.

1760s: Gibson became involved in the Regulator Movement, a grassroots movement of settlers protesting against colonial officials and the corrupt practices of local officials—the movement aimed to bring about greater representation for settlers and challenge the colonial government's power. Gideon, who was leading the Regulators, participated in a clash with a group of constables near Marrs Bluff on the Pee Dee River on July 25, 1767. This event exacerbated the tension between the Governor and the Regulators. Gideon Gibson and the Regulators were portrayed negatively by the South Carolina Gazette 200 miles away in Charleston. According to the August 15, 1768 edition, the Regulators had two distinct factions. One group was composed of individuals of upstanding character and wealth. At the same time, the other was a band of bandits consisting of a large gathering of outcast Mulattos, Mustees, and Free Negroes from the Virginia border and other Northern Colonies. It claimed they were all notorious horse thieves led by Gideon Gibson.

The truth was the Regulators were a group of North and South Carolina colonists who were dissatisfied with the corrupt practices of local officials and sought to bring about reforms. They were not a gang of bandits but concerned citizens who wanted to improve their communities.

The skirmish near Marrs Bluff resulted from tension between the Regulators and the government. The Regulators felt that their grievances were not being addressed, and they resorted to more extreme measures to make their voices heard. However, this incident only served to escalate the conflict between the two sides. 1770s: Gideon Gibson's involvement in the Regulator Movement continues. He participates in protests and demonstrations against colonial officials. The movement eventually culminated in the Battle of Alamance, where colonial troops defeated the Regulators.

=== Loyalists enforce the Stamp Act ===
Loyalist Governor Lord Charles Montagu attempted to enforce the 1765 Stamp Act in South Carolina, which made him unpopular with the local colonists. Montagu tried to encourage favor with the colonials and American rebels, selectively issuing pardons for some of the Regulators. By 1771, Montagu had issued a full pardon for any actions taken by the regulators in his state (with the notable exception of Gideon Gibson Jr. and his followers.) Montague was recalled during the American Revolution.

Gibson was a planter and enslaved people. Notably, some North and South Carolina regulators decided to sit out the Revolutionary War due to the British offering emancipation of anyone enslaved by rebels who joined their lines.

Lord Dunmore's Proclamation, the first mass emancipation of enslaved people in North American history, significantly impacted the course of the Revolutionary War and the eventual abolition of slavery.

== The American Revolution ==
The principal opposition to the Stamp Act proposed by the British colonial authorities in 1764 and later repealed began in Massachusetts colony, which called on the other colonies to convene a convention of deputies in New York.

South Carolina became the first colony to second that motion and the first to advance toward a continental union, long before the other colonies. This shift in popular opinion was of considerable influence to the other colonies, who were divided in their views of the propriety of such a cause. The War of the Regulation in North Carolina and Gibson's rebellion in South Carolina resulted from ordinary people defending what was seen as a just cause. They were against taxation without representation. When the colonial government in Charlestown rejected the petitions for redress of their courts by the bush country landowners, the seeds of the American Revolution were planted. By 1771 the tax skirmishes and imprisonment of various patriots had hardened into a rejection of British rule. Despite his stature in South Carolina and his role as a colonel in the militia, Gideon Gibson Jr. met a tragic end when he was shot and killed by his nephew, Colonel Maurice Murphy, during an argument over Murphy's mistreatment of an elderly Tory during the Revolutionary War.

== Gibson family descendants ==
1832: Gibson's great-grandson Randall Gibson, is born. Randall would become a prominent lawyer and politician in Louisiana, eventually serving as a Confederate general during the Civil War.

1880s: Randall Gibson became involved in founding Tulane University in New Orleans, Louisiana. The university, named after benefactor Paul Tulane, was established as a public-private partnership to educate white male students only. The change to accept and educate students regardless of race or gender changed in the 1970's.

1890s: The Gibson family's legacy continues to live on, with Randall Gibson's descendants playing important roles in Louisiana politics and society.

== See also ==
- Gibson family (Virginia)
- James Williams (Revolutionary War)
