= Sarah Gibson Humphreys =

American novelist

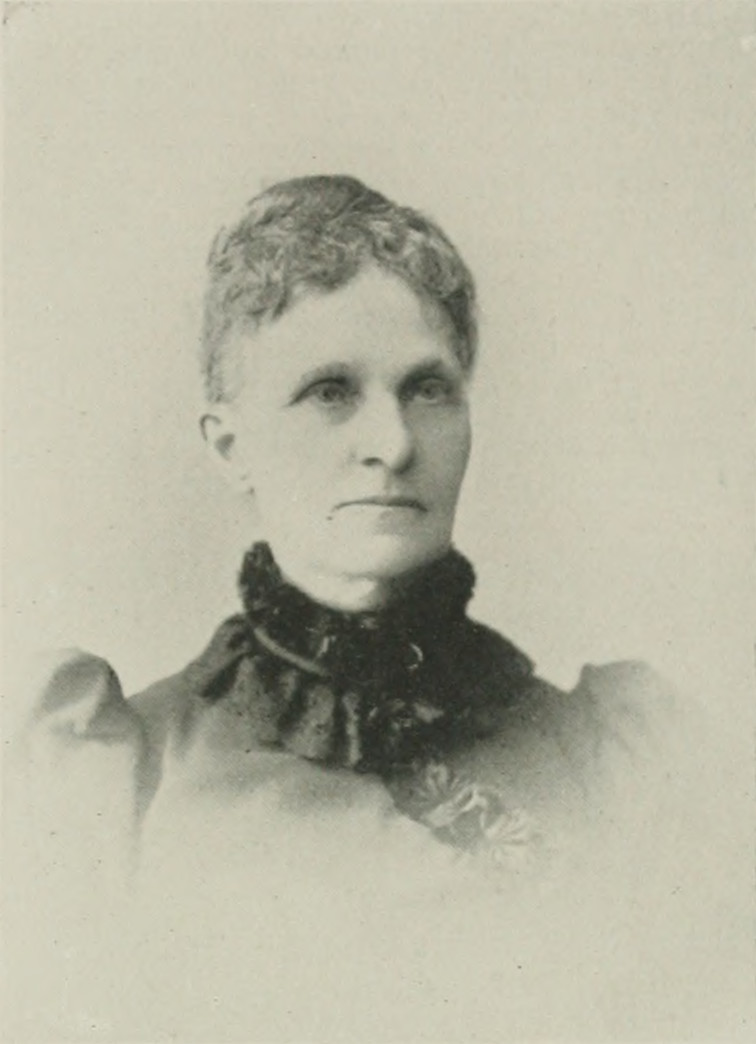
- Photo in A Woman of the Century
- Born: Sarah Thompson Gibson; May 17, 1830; Warren County, Mississippi, U.S.
- Died: May 31, 1907 (aged 77); Lexington, Kentucky, U.S.
- Resting place: Lexington Cemetery, Lexington, Kentucky
- Occupations: Author, suffragist
- Spouse: Joseph A. Humphreys (m. 1853; died 1863)
- Relatives: Randall L. Gibson (uncle)
- Writing career
- Notable works: "Man and Woman in the Bible and in Nature"

Sarah Gibson Humphreys (née, Gibson; May 17, 1830 – May 31, 1907) was an American author and suffragist. In her day, Humphreys was the only woman in the U.S. ever put on the board of directors of a public road by the vote of the officers and stockholders, and probably the only one ever elected to the office of public lecturer to an Alliance lodge. She was also known in Kentucky for her table settings and cooking.

== Early life and education ==
Sarah Thompson Gibson was born in Warren County, Mississippi, on May 17, 1830. Her father was Tobias Gibson, and her mother was Louisiana Breckenridge Hart, of Kentucky. Sarah was a niece of Louisiana Senator, Randall L. Gibson.

Until she was 14, Humphreys' education was supervised by her parents, although the most accomplished teachers were employed to instruct her. At 14, she was sent to the school of Miss Margaret Mercer, of Loudoun County, Virginia. For three years, she studied in the French school of Charles Picot in Philadelphia. Her mother died soon after her return from school, and she assumed the charge of her father's summer home in Lexington, Kentucky, as well as the winter plantation home in Louisiana, and took the place of her mother in the care and control of six brothers younger than herself, and an infant sister.

== Career ==
In 1853, she married Joseph Alexander Humphreys, of Kentucky. He died February 15, 1863, leaving her with a family of little children to bring up and a large estate to manage unaided. After the children got older and she was relieved of some financial responsibilities, Humphreys was able to follow her inclination in literary pursuits and the cause of the emancipation of woman. Her first literary work was a novel, which she wrote when only 13, and which was never published. For at least 10 years, she contributed stories, essays, letters, and sketches to various magazines and papers, always over a pen name. One of her contributions to Bedford's Magazine was the "Negro Libertines in the South."

The most original of Humphrey's literary productions was an article read before the Convention of the Kentucky Equal Rights Association on "Man and Woman in the Bible and in Nature," in which she advanced the theory of the sexual duality of God, of the Adam made in His image, and of all His creatures which were in the beginning spiritual. Through social persecution for her advanced position, the responsibilities of being a wife, mother, and widow, the word "Liberty" became a talisman to her. In her day, Humphreys was the only woman in the United States ever put on the board of directors of a public road by the vote of the officers and stockholders, and probably the only one ever elected to the office of public lecturer to an Alliance lodge.

== Death ==
Sarah Gibson Humphreys died May 31, 1907.
