= St. Matthew's Episcopal Church (Houma, Louisiana) =

Historic church in Louisiana, United States

- Formerly listed on the U.S. National Register of Historic Places
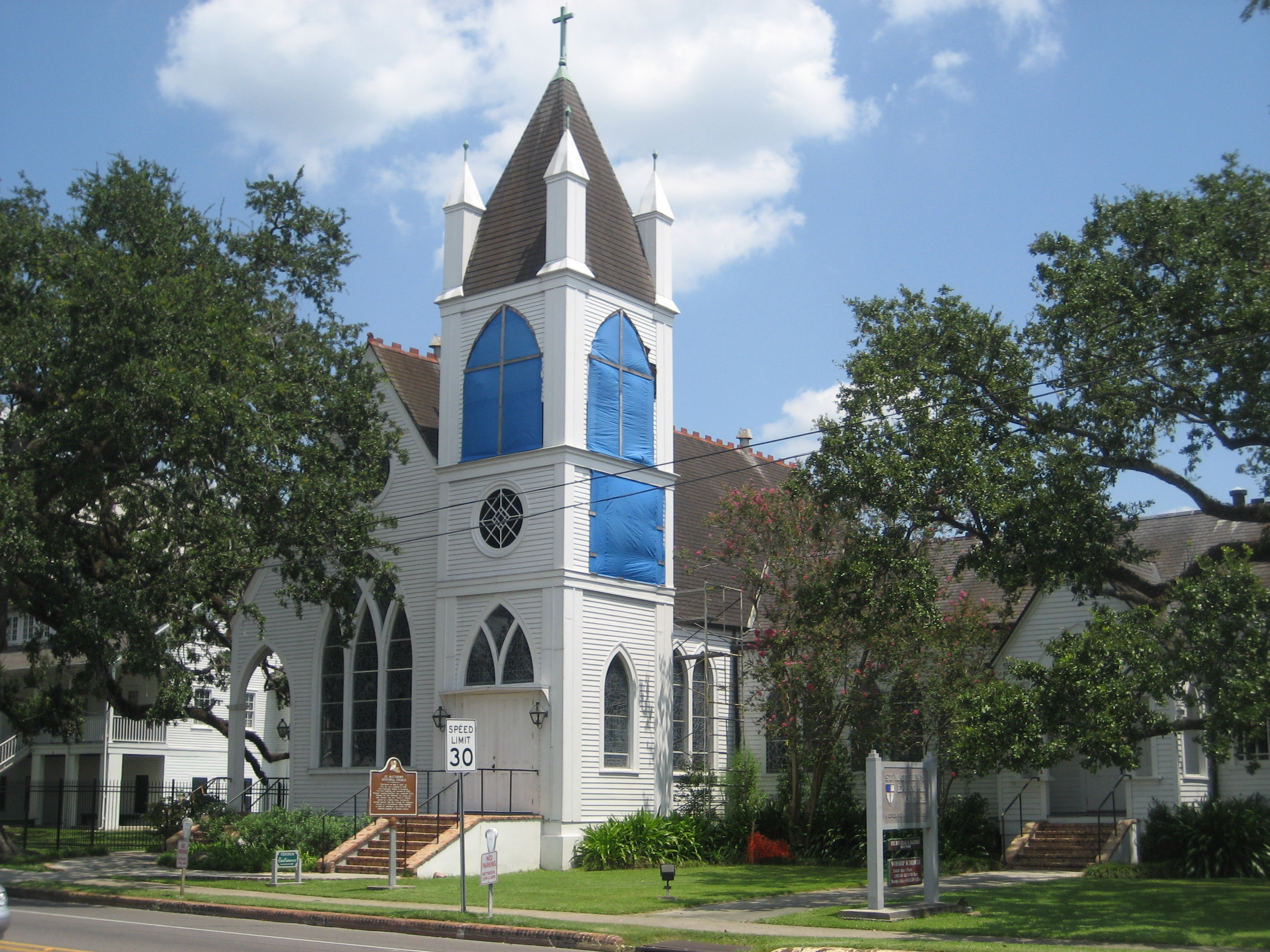

- Location within Louisiana Location within the United States
- Location: 243 Barrow St., Houma, Louisiana
- Coordinates: 29°35′48″N 90°43′7″W
- Area: 0.6 acres (0.24 ha)
- Built: 1892
- Architectural style: Gothic Revival
- NRHP reference No.: 89000331

Significant dates
- Added to NRHP: May 1, 1989
- Removed from NRHP: March 31, 2015

St. Matthew's Episcopal Church is a parish of the Episcopal Church in Houma, Louisiana, in the Episcopal Diocese of Louisiana. It is noted for its historic church at 243 Barrow Street, which was built in 1892. The church was added to the National Register of Historic Places in 1989 and later removed in 2015.

The parish was chartered in 1855. In 1857, Robert Ruffin Barrow donated five lots on Barrow Street, where the first church was built in 1857. In 1888, fire destroyed the rectory and the church was deemed unsafe, leading to the construction of the current buildings 1890–92.

On November 11, 2010, the church was destroyed in a fire and it was delisted from the National Register of Historic Places in March 31, 2015.

== See also ==
- Gibson Methodist Episcopal Church: also NRHP-listed in Terrebonne Parish
- National Register of Historic Places listings in Terrebonne Parish, Louisiana
