= Driggers =

Driggers is a surname most often originating in the Southeastern United States. The surname derives from "Driggus", which derived from the Portuguese name Rodrigues.

Notable people with the surname include:

- Emanuel Driggers (born c. 1620s–d. 1685), paternal ancestor of the Driggers families in the United States
- Nate Driggers (born 1973), American basketball player
- Scott Driggers (born 1962), American handball player

== See also ==
- Driggers D1-A, American monoplane
- Walt Driggers Field, baseball venue in Texas, United States
