= Chavous =

Chavous is a surname. Notable people with the surname include:

- Barney Chavous (born 1951), American football player
- Corey Chavous (born 1976), American football player
- Kevin P. Chavous (born 1956), American attorney, author, education reform activist, and politician
- Wendell Chavous (born 1985), American professional stock car racing driver and entrepreneur
