= Old Warren County Courthouse =

- Old Courthouse, Warren County
- U.S. National Register of Historic Places
- U.S. National Historic Landmark
- Mississippi Landmark
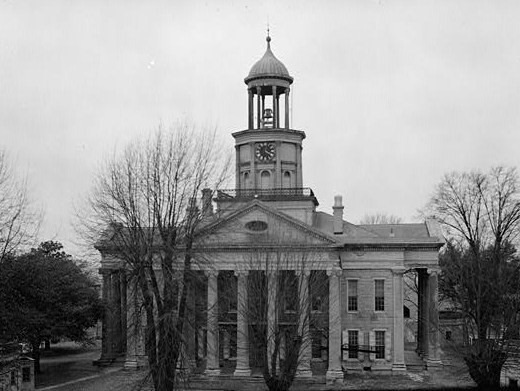
- The Old Courthouse in 1940

- Location within Mississippi Location within the United States
- Interactive map showing the location of Old Warren County Courthouse
- Location: 1008 Cherry Street, Vicksburg, Mississippi
- Coordinates: 32°21′7.38″N 90°52′43.04″W
- Built: 1861
- Architect: William Weldon
- Architectural style: Greek Revival
- NRHP reference No.: 68000029
- USMS No.: 149-VKS-0042-NHL-ML

Significant dates
- Added to NRHP: May 23, 1968
- Designated NHL: May 23, 1968
- Designated USMS: March 5, 1986

The Old Courthouse, Warren County, stands prominently on a hill in Vicksburg, Mississippi, and was a symbol of Confederate resistance during the Siege of Vicksburg. It was designated a National Historic Landmark in 1968 and a Mississippi Landmark in 1986. The landmarked area comprises the entire Courthouse Square, which includes the courthouse and four attached buildings that were originally cistern houses for catching rainwater to fight fires, but these were later converted into offices. Since 1948, it has served as The Old Courthouse Museum, focused on local history and the Confederacy.

== History ==
Atop one of the highest bluffs in Vicksburg, construction began in the summer of 1858. The property for the new building was donated to the city by its founder, Newitt Vick. The Weldon brothers from Rodney, Mississippi, were hired to build the courthouse, which was completed in 1860 at a cost of $100,000.

During the Civil War, the building was one of the main targets in Vicksburg. As hard as the Union tried, the building suffered only one major hit. After a 47-day siege, on July 4, 1863, the Stars and Bars were lowered and the Stars and Stripes were raised. Many historical figures have visited the courthouse over the years, including Jefferson Davis, Booker T. Washington, William McKinley, and Theodore Roosevelt.

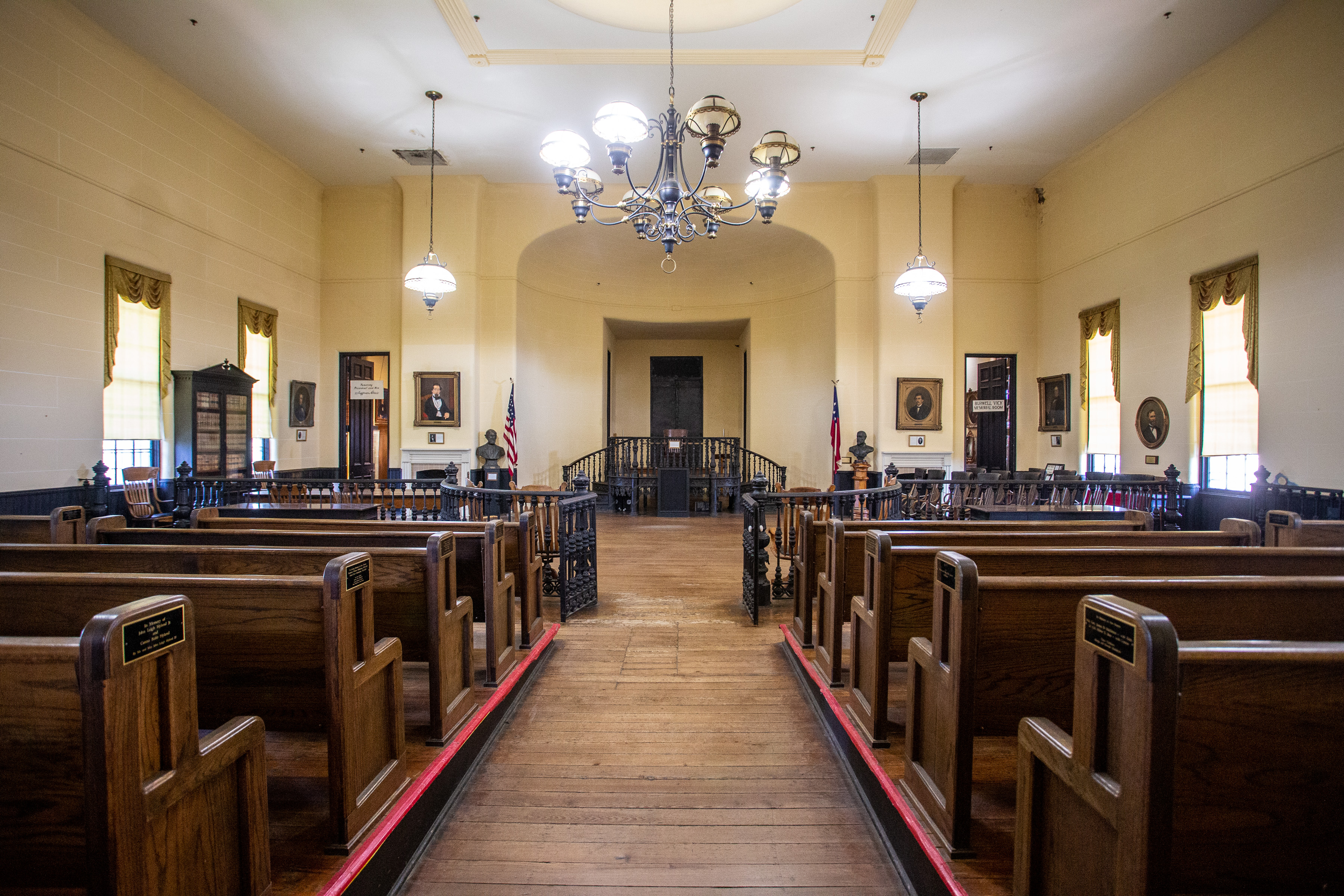
Interior of the courtroom

Famous trials were conducted in the building's second-floor courtroom. One was of freed slave Holt Collier, who in 1867 was arrested and charged with the murder of a white police officer from North Mississippi. He was acquitted of all charges for defending his former owner's name.

On December 7, 1874, during the Reconstruction-era, the Warren County Courthouse was the site of the first brutal event related to the Vicksburg massacre, when Black citizens were attempting to reinstate the newly elected Black sheriff Peter Crosby who had been coerced at gunpoint by a White militant group to sign a paper of resignation. The event which lasted into January of the following year, and ended with the arrival of the U.S. Army.

The original iron doors and shutters are still on the building today.

Following the construction of the new Warren County Courthouse in 1939, the old building was neglected. Throughout the early 1940s, Eva Whitaker Davis, founder of the Vicksburg and Warren County Historical Society, conducted a letter-writing campaign and other public efforts to preserve the old courthouse. With the approval of the county board of supervisors, supervised prison inmates helped Davis clean and repair the building for use as a museum. On June 3, 1948, the building was reopened as The Old Courthouse Museum.
