= Peter Crosby (clergy) =

Canadian clergy

Peter Crosby is the current Archdeacon of Ottawa.
