= Magotha, Virginia =

Unincorporated community in Virginia, US

Coordinates: 37°10′49″N 75°56′56″W

Magotha is an unincorporated community in Northampton County, Virginia, United States which is known mostly for poultry and small chicken farming.
