= Sizemore =

Sizemore is a family name. Notable people with the surname include:

- Barbara Sizemore (1927–2004), American educator and researcher
- Bill Sizemore (born 1951), American political activist
- Chris Costner Sizemore (1927–2016), American patient with multiple personality disorder
- Grady Sizemore III (born 1982), American professional baseball player
- Herschel Sizemore (1935–2022), American mandolinist
- James Sizemore (born 1978), American composer and orchestrator of film scores
- Jason Sizemore, American writer and editor
- Scott Sizemore (born 1985), American professional baseball player
- Susan Sizemore (1951–2020), American novelist
- Ted Sizemore (born 1945), American former professional baseball player
- Tom Sizemore (1961–2023), American actor

== See also ==
- Roy Sizmore (born 1950), English former motorcycle speedway rider and Grasstrack rider
