= Driggers D1-A =

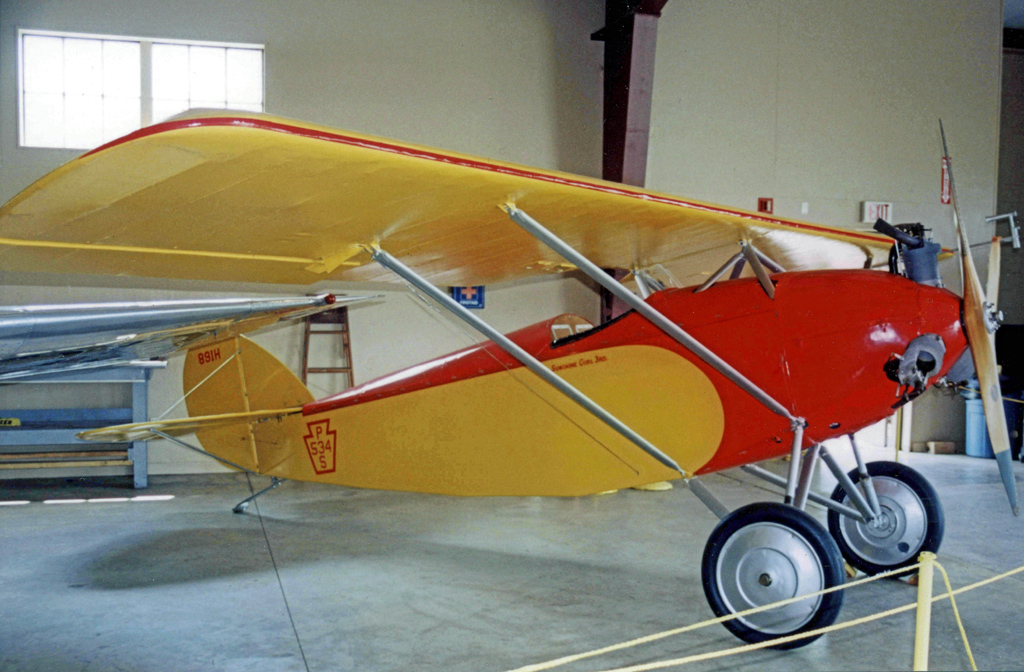
- The sole Driggers D1-A exhibited at the EAA Museum at Oshkosh, Wisconsin, in 2006

General information
- Type: light sporting monoplane
- National origin: United States
- Manufacturer: Willard A. Driggers
- Designer: Willard A. Driggers
- Status: preserved
- Primary user: builder
- Number built: one

History
- Introduction date: 1929
- Retired: 1936

The Driggers D1-A is an American-built light high-wing single-seat sporting monoplane of the late 1920s.

== Design and development ==
Willard A. Driggers of Washington, DC and Willow Grove, Pennsylvania designed and built the D1-A in 1929. It is a parasol high-wing monoplane with the aerofoil braced from the upper fuselage and lower fuselage. A fixed tailwheel undercarriage is fitted. The tailplane is set high on the rear fuselage and is braced. The rounded fin has a large rudder area. The 60 h.p. Lawrance L-4 engine is fitted within an elegant curved cowling with the cylinder heads protruding to allow air cooling. The D1-A has manufacturers number 1 and is registered N891H. Driggers went on to design and build the two-seat Driggers D2-A in 1933.

== Operational history ==
The builder and owner flew the D1-A from 1929 until 1936, when it was damaged in a ground loop. It was named Sunshine Girl III. The aircraft was stored until 1968 when an Experimental Aircraft Association group rebuilt it for static exhibition. It is currently displayed at the EAA museum at Oshkosh Wisconsin.

== Specifications ==
Data from Aerofiles

General characteristics

- Crew: 1
- Length: 17 ft 8 in (5.38 m)
- Wingspan: 22 ft 9 in (6.93 m)
- Powerplant: 1 × Lawrance L-4 piston, 60 hp (45 kW)

Performance

- Maximum speed: 95 mph (153 km/h, 83 kn)
- Cruise speed: 85 mph (137 km/h, 74 kn)
- Stall speed: 40 mph (64 km/h, 35 kn)
- Range: 245 mi (394 km, 213 nmi)
