= Vicksburg massacre =

Anti-black racial massacre in Mississippi, US

- Vicksburg troubles, Vicksburg riot Part of the Reconstruction era
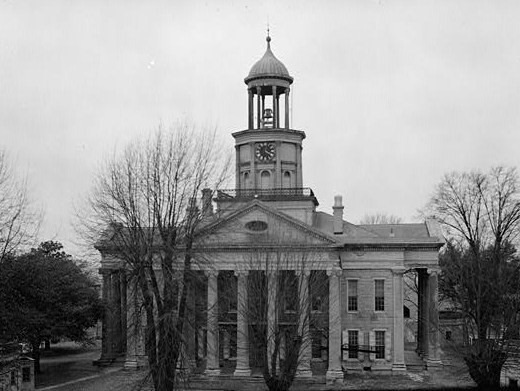
- Warren County Courthouse (c. 1940)
- Date: December 7, 1874 – January 5, 1875
- Location: Vicksburg, Warren County, Mississippi, United States
- Caused by: White supremacy
- Methods: Shootings
- Result: 150-300 deaths of Black citizens; 2 deaths of White citizens

The Vicksburg massacre, sometimes referred to as the Vicksburg riot, was a freedmen massacre on December 7, 1874, that continued until around January 5, 1875, in Vicksburg, Mississippi, United States. An estimated 150–300 Black citizens, and 2 White citizens were killed during the violence. Sheriff Peter Crosby, an African American, was forcibly removed from office, reinstated, and then shot in the head.

== Background ==
After the American Civil War ended in 1865, the United States underwent a period of Reconstruction. During Reconstruction, former slaves were granted citizenship and African-American men were granted the franchise by the 14th and 15th Amendments. The consequences of this were far-reaching and almost immediate, as freedmen eagerly registered and flooded the polls.

In November 1873, Peter Crosby, a Black man was elected as sheriff of Warren County, Mississippi; and he was to assume the office the following January 1, 1874. Mississippi Governor Adelbert Ames assumed his office only a few days after Crosby, on January 4, 1874. On December 2, 1874, members of a White citizens organization known as the Taxpayers’ League, met in the sheriff's office and demanded Crosby's signed resignation. Crosby refused and the group returned with six hundred armed White men, and at gunpoint Crosby was forced to sign his own resignation paperwork.

== The massacre ==
On December 7, 1874, Black citizens from Vicksburg marched to the Warren County Courthouse with the goal of reinstating Crosby to office. At the courthouse they were met with an armed White mob, that told them to go home. Some of the Black citizens were leaving, when a second White group (referred to as the White League in some citations) allegedly opened fire on the mostly unarmed Black group. However reports differ on exactly who fired weapons first. One White man was killed, and twenty five Black men were killed during the December 7, 1874 event.

Following this attack, President Ulysses S. Grant sent federal troops to Vicksburg. The killing continued south of the city including the burning of gin houses, and some historians estimate that anywhere between 150 and 300 Black citizens were killed on January 5, 1875, when United States Army forces under Gen. Phil Sheridan arrived to secure the city. Shortly after the arrival of the troops, they reinstated Crosby as sheriff.

== Aftermath ==
Governor Adelbert Ames was forced to leave the state during the event. In the 1875 elections, White Democrats regained control of a majority of seats in the state legislature.

Upon reinstatement, Crosby hired a new deputy, a White man named J.P. Gilmer. Gilmer attempted to assassinate Crosby and shot him in the head on June 7, 1875, after not wanting to follow orders from the Black sheriff. Gilmer was arrested but never went to trial. Crosby did not die and he never fully recovered from his wounds; and his remaining term in office was served by a White man. His term as sheriff ended in the last quarter of 1875.

Following the Vicksburg massacre, a congressional inquiry took place, with 115 witnesses. The White mob was found at fault by the majority of US Congress, and the dissenting report placed the blame on the Black population.

Into the 20th century, Vicksburg continued to struggle with racial tension and racial violence. From 1877 until 1950, Warren County had fourteen recorded lynchings of Black people by White people. It was the highest amount of lynching in the surrounding area, and most likely not all of the lynching events were recorded.

== See also ==
- Mass racial violence in the United States
- List of incidents of civil unrest in the United States
- Red Shirts and White League, two Southern US white supremacist paramilitary organizations
- Redeemers, Southern US anti-Reconstruction political group
- Political violence
