= Oxendine =

Oxendine is a surname. It is documented to be of free African-American origin.

Notable people with the surname include:

- John Oxendine (born 1962), American politician
- Ken Oxendine (born 1975), American football player
- Henry Ward Oxendine (born 1940), American lawyer and politician
- Chad Oxendine (born 1981), American baseball coach
