= Sangu =

Sangu may refer to:

- Sangu people
- Sangu clan, a clan of Gujjar community
- Sangu dynasty, Gurjar (Gujjar) dynasty of Kashmir
- Sangu language (Gabon)
- Sangu language (Tanzania)
- Sanghu, Taplejung, Nepal
- Sangu River, Bangladesh
- Sangu (armour), samurai armour
