= Songo (surname) =

Songo is a surname. Notable people with the surname include:

- Tommy Songo (born 1995), Liberian footballer
- Sam Songo (1929 – c. 1977), Rhodesian artist
