= Peter Crosby (sheriff) =

American sheriff (1844–1884)

- Born: between c. 1844 – c. 1848; Clarke County, Mississippi, U.S.
- Died: March 15, 1884; Vicksburg, Warren County, Mississippi, U.S.
- Occupations: Sheriff, tax collector, military officer, businessperson

Peter Crosby (c. 1844–1884), was an American sheriff, tax collector, military officer, and businessperson. In 1873, during the Reconstruction era, Crosby was the first African American to be elected as sheriff in Warren County. Crosby was forcibly removed from his office in December 1874 by an angry mob of White militia, an event often referred to as the Vicksburg massacre.

== Early life and military service ==
Peter Crosby was born, as a slave, in c. 1844, in Clarke County, Mississippi, U.S. Some records have his year of birth as 1846. He was described as "mulatto" in some records. At the age of 20 during the American Civil War, Crosby joined the United States Colored Troops (a Union Army regiment) in Company C, 5th U.S. Colored Heavy Artillery in Vicksburg, Mississippi.

Crosby joined a Black political group in 1872, the Vicksburg Ring. He served as treasurer of Warren County in 1873. By 1875, he acquired large sums of property, which made him the most well-off Black community member in Vicksburg.

== Sheriff career ==
Extremist White Democrats in Mississippi had publicly threatened violence for anyone not voting for them after the Civil War. Crosby was a Republican and was elected as county sheriff in November 1873, and he was to assume the office the following January 1, 1874. The Democrats declared Crosby's bond invalid. On December 2, 1874, members of the Taxpayers’ League, a White citizens organization, met in the sheriff's office and demanded Crosby's resignation. The group returned with six hundred armed White men, and at gunpoint Crosby was forced to sign his own resignation paperwork.

Days later on December 7, 1874, Black citizens from Vicksburg marched to the Warren County Courthouse with the goal of reinstating Crosby to office. The group of Black citizens was told to go home by one White mob that had met them at the courthouse. Some of the Black citizens were slowly leaving, when a second White group (referred to as the White League in some citations) allegedly opened fire on the mostly unarmed Black group. Reports differ on exactly who fired weapons first, but only one White man was killed and twenty five Black men were killed during the December 7, 1874 event. This was later referred to as the Vicksburg Massacre (or the Vicksburg riots).

Following this attack, President Ulysses S. Grant sent federal troops to Vicksburg. The killing continued south of the city, and some historians estimate that anywhere between 150 and 300 Black citizens were killed on January 5, 1875, when U.S. Army forces under Gen. Phil Sheridan arrived to secure the city. They reinstated Crosby as sheriff shortly after the arrival of the U.S. Army.

Upon reinstatement, Crosby hired a new deputy, a White man named J.P. Gilmer. Gilmer attempted to assassinate Crosby and shot him in the head on June 7, 1875, after not wanting to follow orders from the Black sheriff. Gilmer was arrested but never went to trial. Crosby did not die and he never fully recovered from his wounds; and his remaining term in office was served by a White man. His term as sheriff ended in the last quarter of 1875.

Following the Vicksburg Massacre, a congressional inquiry took place, with 115 witnesses.

== Death and legacy ==
Crosby died at the age of forty on March 15, 1884, in Vicksburg.

Warren County would not see another Black sheriff serve until Otha Jones, appointed from 1995 to 1996 (120 years after Crosby). There are no known images of Crosby. In 2015, a portrait of Crosby by local student Michael Neal was added to the lobby of the sheriff's office in Warren County placed alongside many of the other historical sheriffs.

== See also ==
- Red Shirts and White League, two Southern US white supremacist paramilitary organizations
- Redeemers, Southern US anti-Reconstruction political group
