= George Washington Chavis =

American politician (c. 1817-?)

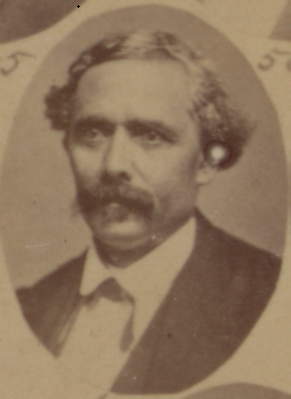
George Washington Chavis.

George Washington Chavis (c. 1817 – after 1880) was an American free man of color who served in the Mississippi Legislature. He served in the Mississippi House of Representatives from Warren County in 1874 and 1875.

== Biography ==
Chavis was born circa 1817 in Tennessee; his father was a free man of color who owned a plantation in Warren County, Mississippi.

As of the 1850 United States census, Chavis and his wife and children lived in Copiah County, Mississippi, and he owned one slave. Chavis subsequently moved to Illinois after Mississippi banned "free people of color". Per the 1860 census and 1870 census, he and his family lived in Massac County, Illinois. Chavis returned to Mississippi in the early 1870s.

In 1879, Chavis wrote to Blanche K. Bruce that is it "too late now for much reform" and that he was planning to leave the state because "the old rebs has too much old prenudice that is bound to destroy not only the one that has it but will destroy both soul and body and a nation that will let it rule the government."

His son Jordan Chavis graduated from Alcorn State and became a teacher; he later served as a chaplain in the Spanish–American War.

Chavis's date of death is unknown; he last appeared on the 1880 United States census.
