= Daniel Sharfstein =

Legal scholar

Daniel J. Sharfstein is a professor of law and history at Vanderbilt University and a legal scholar who has written books and articles about the legal history of the United States and African Americans as well as Oliver Otis Howard and the war against Nez Perce. He was a 2013 Guggenheim Fellow.

He graduated from Harvard College and then worked for 3 years as a journalist. He received his Juris Doctor degree from Yale Law School, clerked for judge Dorothy W. Nelson at the U.S. Court of Appeals for the Ninth Circuit and for judge Rya W. Zobel of the U.S. District Court for the District of Massachusetts. He was an associate at Strumwasser & Woocher, a public interest law firm in Santa Monica, California.

He is the director of the George Barrett Social Justice Program at Vanderbilt. He delivered the Edward L. Prichard lecture at the University of Kentucky in 2019.

In 2021 he was researching a book on New York's garment workers.

== Selected bibliography ==
- Sharfstein, Daniel J (2012). "Atrocity, Entitlement, and Personhood in Property". Virginia Law Review. 98 (635). SSRN 2109960. Winner of the Association of American Law Schools 2011 Scholarly Papers Competition.
- Sharfstein, Daniel J. (2011). The Invisible Line: Three American Families and the Secret Journey from Black to White. Penguin Press. OCLC 650210744. Winner of the 2012 J. Anthony Lukas Book Prize for excellence in non-fiction, Law & Society Association 2012 James Willard Hurst Jr. Prize for socio-legal history, William Nelson Cromwell Book Prize from the American Society for Legal History, and the Chancellor’s Award for Research from Vanderbilt.
- Sharfstein, Daniel J. (2017). Thunder in the Mountains: Chief Joseph, Oliver Otis Howard and the Nez Perce War. W.W. Norton & Company. OCLC 951070818.
- Sharfstein DJ. "Reading American Anarchy as a Legal History of Immigrants: Forum on Willrich’s American Anarchy" Law and History Review. 2025;43(1):189-194.
