= Tigerville, Louisiana =

Unincorporated community in Louisiana

- Unincorporated community
- Location within Louisiana Location within the United States
- Coordinates: 30°02′34″N 90°32′36″W
- Country: United States
- State: Louisiana
- Parish: St. John the Baptist
- Elevation: 13 ft (4.0 m)
- Time zone: UTC-6 (Central (CST))
  - Summer (DST): UTC-5 (CDT)
- Area code: 985
- GNIS feature ID: 1628368

Tigerville is an unincorporated community in St. John the Baptist Parish, in the U.S. state of Louisiana.

== Etymology ==
According to tradition, Tigerville was so named when early settlers mistook native cougars for tigers.
