= The Other Madisons =

The Other Madisons may refer to:

- The Other Madisons (book), a 2020 memoir by Bettye Kearse
- The Other Madisons (film), a 2021 documentary based on the 2020 memoir
