= Weaver family =

Weaver family may refer to:

- Araneidae, a family of orb-weaver spiders
- Ploceidae, a family of birds commonly called weavers
- Weaver family (North Carolina), an American pioneer family that founded Weaverville, NC
- Weaver family standoff, the siege of a cabin by the United States Marshals Service in 1992
- Weaver family (Virginia), a free African-American family from colonial Virginia
