= Marriage of Charlie Johns and Eunice Winstead =

1937 child marriage in Tennessee, U.S.

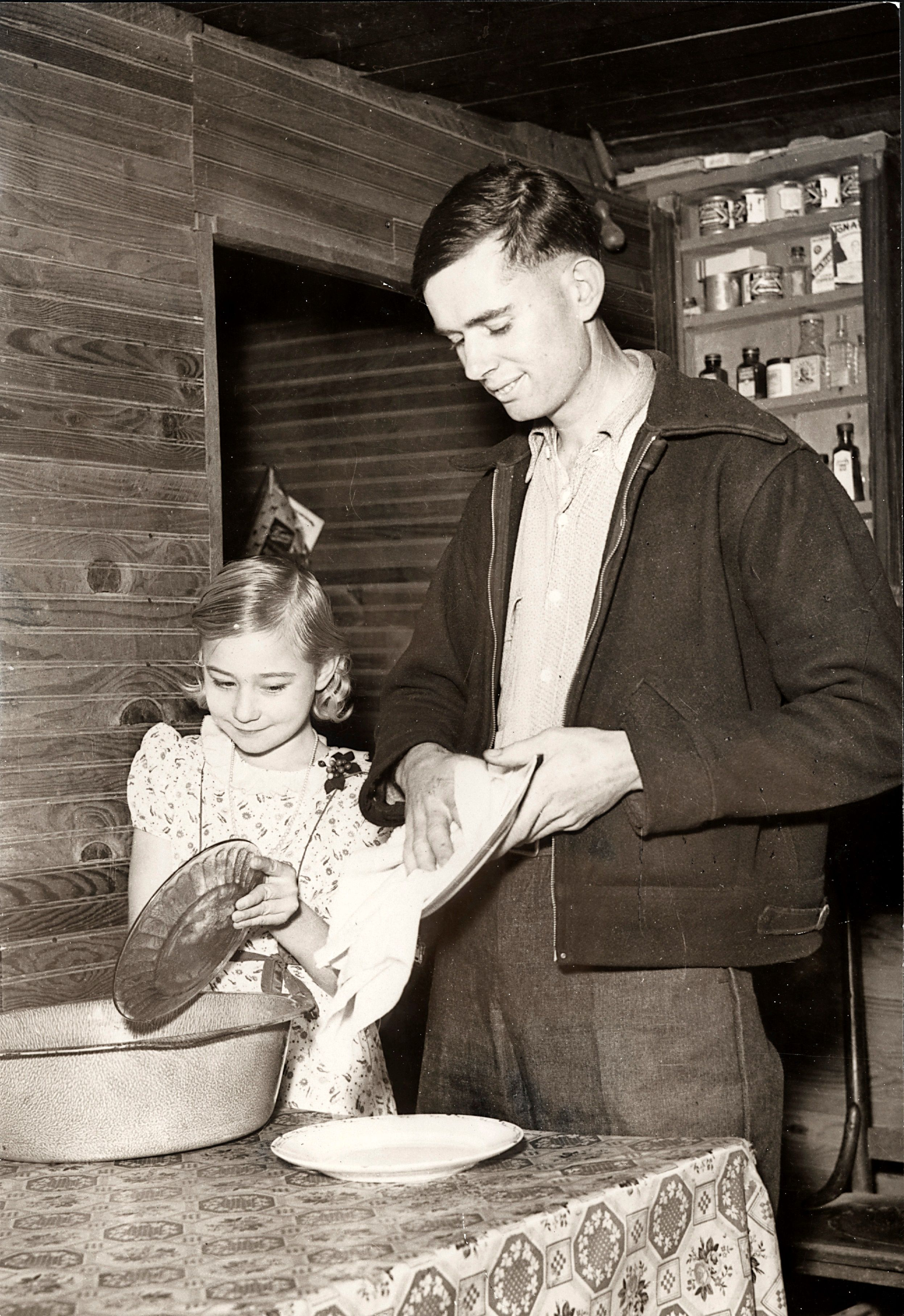
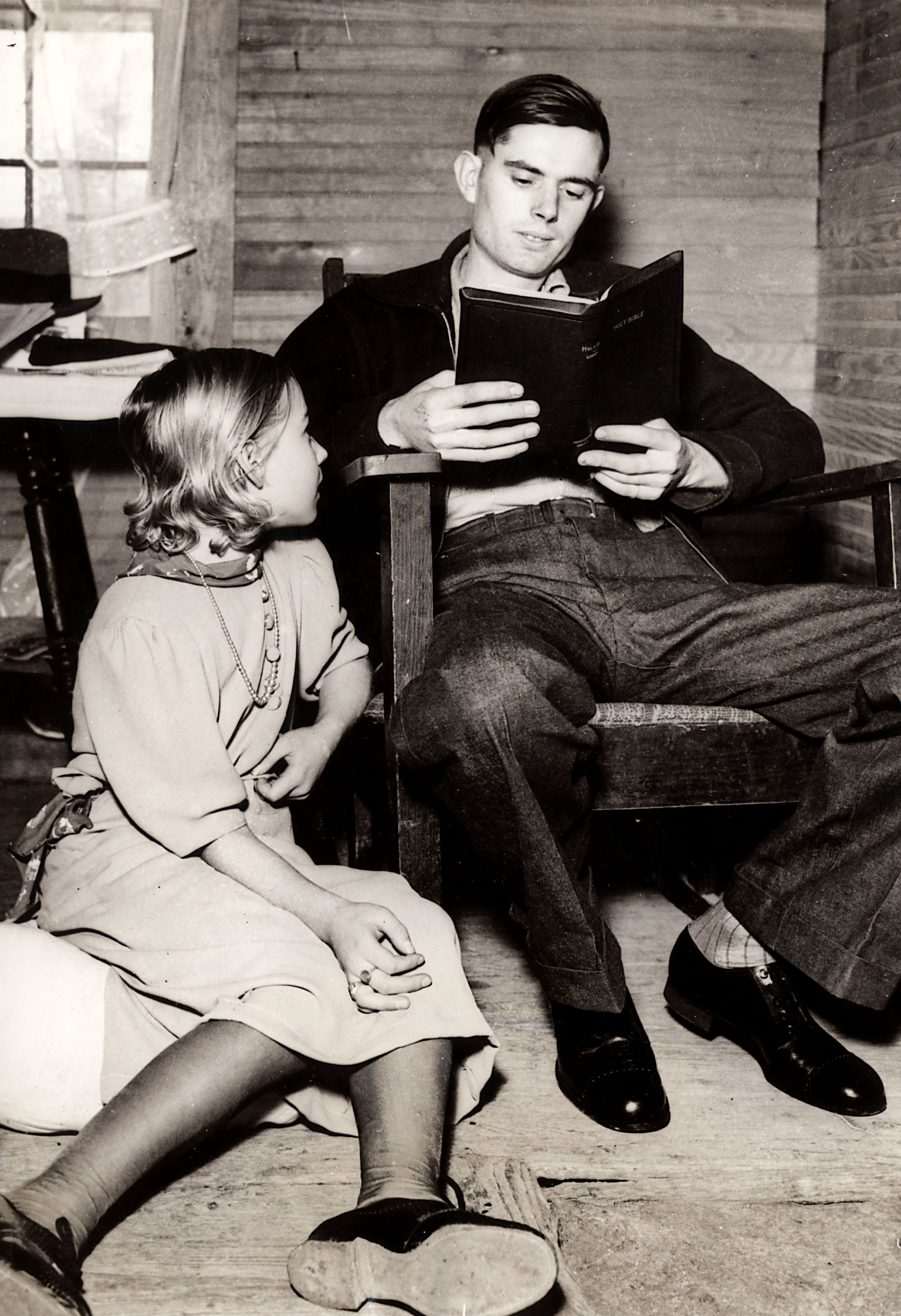
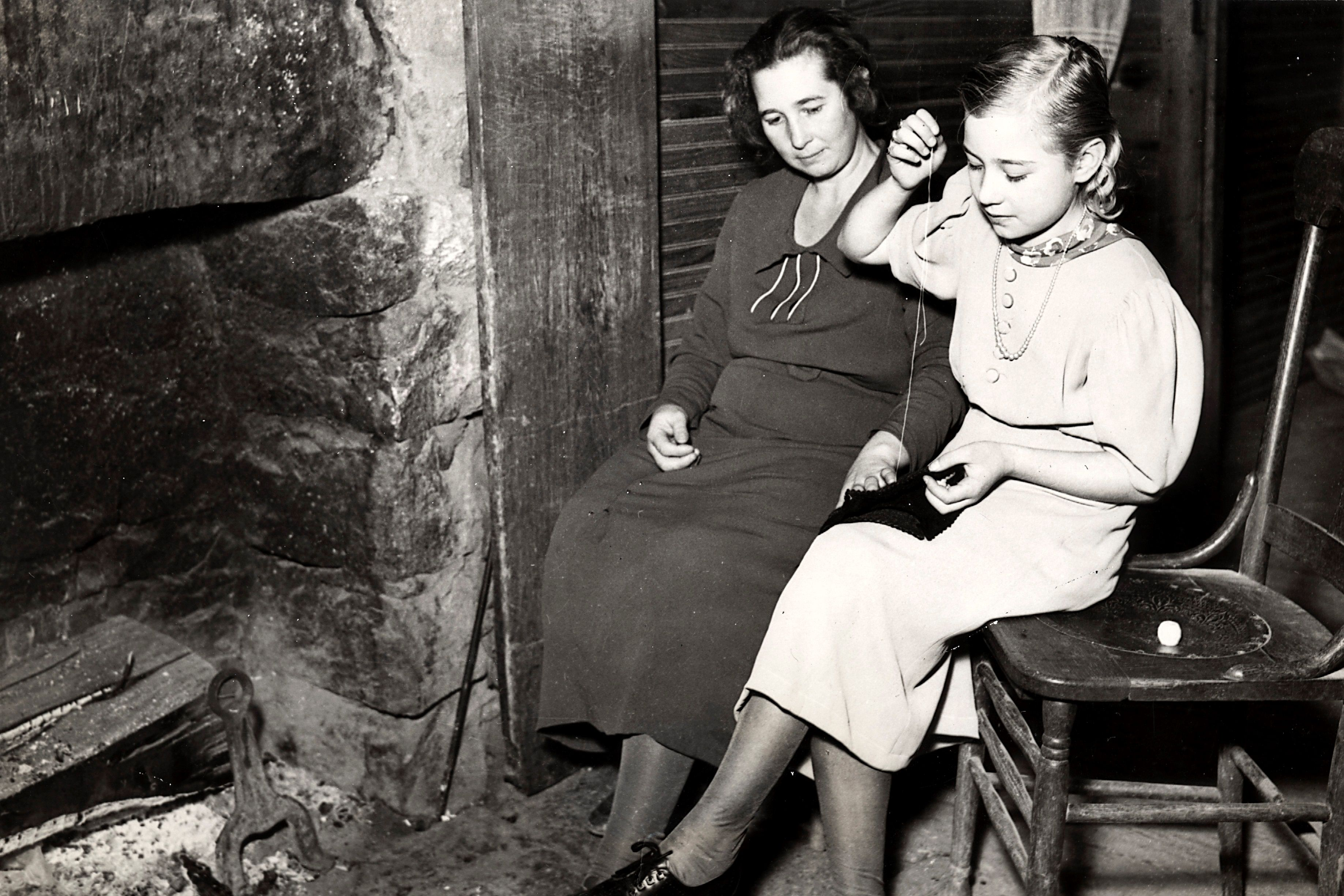
Eunice Johns, Charlie Johns, and Mrs. Lewis Winstead (née Martha Elizabeth Harris)

The marriage of Sneedville, Tennessee residents 22-year-old Charlie Johns and 9-year-old Eunice Winstead, was a child marriage that took place in the state of Tennessee, United States, in January 1937. The event received national attention after Life magazine published an article about the union the following month.

In response to Johns and Winstead's marriage, the state of Tennessee introduced a law setting the minimum age of marriage at sixteen years. Only the jurisdictions of Minnesota, Rhode Island, and Washington, D.C. introduced similar laws. The couple remained married after the Tennessee law was passed, and the marriage lasted until Johns' death in 1997. Johns and Winstead had nine children.

== Marriage ==
On January 19, 1937, 24-year-old tobacco farmer Charlie Johns married his 9-year-old neighbor, Eunice Winstead. The couple was joined by Baptist preacher Walter Lamb in Sneedville, Hancock County. Johns paid Lamb a dollar (equivalent to $22 in 2025) to perform the marriage. To get to the wedding without her parents' knowledge, Winstead told them she was going out to get a doll.

Johns falsified Winstead's age in order to obtain their marriage license. At the time of their marriage, the state of Tennessee had no minimum age for marriage. Winstead's mother had married at the age of sixteen, and her sister Ina married at thirteen. Though the mothers of Johns and Winstead initially believed that Eunice was too young to marry, they ultimately decided to approve of the marriage.

== Reactions ==
Johns and Winstead's marriage was discovered by the press approximately ten days after the wedding. It was then widely covered by American newspapers and magazines. The union was reported by The Times and Life magazines, along with The New York Times. It also inspired the 1938 film Child Bride. Johns avoided media attention, accusing reporters of making things up, and he did not allow any photographs to be taken of his wife and children.

A 1937 piece published by Life about the case displayed a picture of Winstead and Johns at their home in Sneedville. In a news article published that year, The Knoxville Journal reported that "The Winstead family seems complacent over the future of the 9-year-old bride because Charlie, the bridegroom, owns 50 acres of mountain land, several mules and he's a good farmer". Another article in Newsweek portrayed Winstead sitting on Johns' knee.

Reactions to the marriage triggered a change to the law in Tennessee, forbidding marriage of individuals under the age of 16, even if they had parental consent. It provided for exceptions in cases such as pregnancy.

== Later life ==
Winstead dropped out of school in 1937. She attended school for two days but her husband pulled her out after she was punished for misbehaving. State law was changed to reflect that married children were exempt from compulsory education.

As of 1938, the couple still lived with Johns' parents. They slept together in the same room. In December 1942, at the age of fourteen, Winstead gave birth to the couple's first child. They subsequently had eight more children. Johns objected when his oldest child, 17-year-old Evelyn, eloped in 1960 with 20-year-old John Antrican. He alleged that Antrican had falsified Evelyn's age to obtain a marriage license. Johns and Winstead remained married until Johns' death in 1997. Winstead died in 2006.

== See also ==
- Child marriage in the United States
- Marriage age in the United States
- Marriage of Daddy and Peaches
