= Xenophon, Tennessee =

- Unincorporated community
- Location within Tennessee Location within the United States
- Coordinates: 36°29′27″N 83°19′35″W
- Country: United States
- State: Tennessee
- County: Hancock
- Elevation: 1,257 ft (383 m)
- Time zone: UTC-5 (Eastern (EST))
  - Summer (DST): UTC-4 (EDT)
- Area code: 423
- GNIS feature ID: 1308276

Xenophon is an unincorporated community in Hancock County, Tennessee, United States. Xenophon is located on Tennessee State Route 33 6.6 miles (10.6 km) west-southwest of Sneedville.
