= South Asians in the Thirteen Colonies =

South Asians had been present in the colonies that became the United States since at least 1635 with the recording of an East Indian man named "Tony" in the Colony of Virginia. They were brought over as indentured servants and sometimes slaves who eventually assimilated into the dominant white and black American populations.

== History ==
Researcher Paul Heinegg identified a handful of free, indentured, or enslaved Indians in colonial and early American records, mostly in Maryland and Virginia. However, he also notes that blacks seeking to free themselves from strict racial laws of the era would occasionally claim to be of East Indian descent to minimize their African ancestry.

== Notable individuals and families of Indian descent ==
- Jordan Arterburn and Tarlton Arterburn - Kentucky slave traders of Indian descent
- Weaver family - Virginia family descended from East Indian servants whom escaped their plantation

== See also ==
- Melungeons
- Free people of color
- Indian Americans
- Anglo-Indians
- Lascar
- Luso-Indians
