= Weaver, Indiana =

Unincorporated community in Indiana, U.S.

- Unincorporated community
- Location within Indiana Location within the United States
- Coordinates: 40°27′55″N 85°43′45″W
- Country: United States
- State: Indiana
- County: Grant
- Township: Liberty
- Elevation: 873 ft (266 m)
- ZIP code: 46953

Weaver is an unincorporated community in Liberty Township, Grant County, Indiana. Weaver's first settlers were free people of color who migrated from North Carolina and South Carolina to Grant County in the early 1840s. The neighborhood was originally known as Crossroad; however, it was later renamed Weaver in honor of a prominent family of the community. The rural settlement reached its peak in the late 1800s, when its population reportedly reached 2,000. Many of its residents left the community for higher-paying jobs in larger towns during the Indiana's natural gas boom, but more than 100 families remained in the settlement in the early 1920s. Weaver, as with most of Indiana's black rural settlements, no longer exists as a self-contained community, but Weaver Cemetery remains as a community landmark.

== History ==
Weaver was one of Indiana's early black pioneer communities. Dating from the 1840s, Weaver's first settlers were free people of color and ex-slaves, who migrated from North Carolina and South Carolina. With aid from Aaron Betts, a white Quaker from Ohio, Billy Clark, John Wright, Robert Smith, Robert Brazelton, and Robert Brown settled in Grant County in 1847.

Byrd [Burd] Weaver, a free person of color, was another early settler. It is believed that Weaver arrived around 1847; he is listed in the 1850 census for Grant County. Other of the community's early pioneers were members of the Pettiford [Pettifoot] family, also free people of color. The Weavers and Pettifords were originally from North Carolina. Later arrivals to the settlement migrated from Wayne County and Randolph County, Indiana, and Chillicothe, Ohio. William Wood was among the Weaver community's wealthiest landowners; Byrd Weaver was known for his leadership in recruiting new settlers to the community. Other members of the Weaver family had prominent positions in the community, such as postmaster and storekeeper.

Weaver developed as a farming community in the 1850s and 1860s. Only three African American families who lived in Liberty Township, one of whom was headed by Byrd Weaver, were identified in the 1850 census. By 1860 the township's black population was 284 individuals. The community continued to attract new migrants during the American Civil War-era, including freed and escaped slaves. Some Weaver residents farmed their own land, while others worked on farms owned by their white neighbors. Although the main occupation of the settlement's men was farming, some provided additional services to the community. Beverly Pettiford was a farmer and a shoemaker; Jack White was a farmer who played a violin at community gatherings.

Weaver eventually had its own school, church, general store, and blacksmith shop. When the community reached its peak in the 1870s and 1880s, its population reportedly reached nearly 2,000 individuals. A post office was established at Weaver in 1880 and remained in operation until 1902.

After Grant County experienced a natural gas boom during the 1880s, many of its rural citizens, including those from Weaver, relocated to larger industrial towns, such as nearby Marion and Gas City, to find better-paying jobs. The Indiana gas boom has also been attributed as a factor in changing the attitudes of Grant County's general population, including an increase in racial tension. In the early twentieth century Weaver's population continued to decline, although more than 100 black families remained at the settlement in the early 1920s. Most of Indiana's early black rural settlements, including Weaver, no longer exist.

== Geography ==
Weaver was established in northern Liberty Township, Grant County, Indiana. Several streams, including Big Deer, Grassy Fork, and Middle Fork Creeks, flow through the township in southwestern Grant County, which is known for its level terrain and rich soil. As with other early black rural settlements in Indiana, Weaver was established near Quakers, who were known for their strong antislavery views.

== Demographics ==
Founded by free blacks and ex-slaves, Weaver saw an increase in population in the late 1840s and early 1850s. The settlement peaked in the late 1800s, when its population reportedly reached 2,000 individuals. Many of the settlement's residents had kinship ties. The Weaver family, for example, had sixty members in sixteen households by 1860. The neighborhood became known as the Crossroads early in its history, but it was later renamed Weaver because many of its residents had the Weaver surname. Other Weaver settlers included those with surnames of Smith, Hill, Pettiford, Burden, Ward, Jones, Wood, Guillford, Artis, and White, among others. Weaver began to decline in early twentieth century and it no longer exists as a self-contained community.

== Education ==
The neighborhood's children attended Weaver School, a one-room schoolhouse that was formally known as Liberty Township School Number 2. Established in 1869, the segregated public school served as the educational and community center of the settlement. West School, another township school, was built one mile west of Weaver School.

== Religion ==
Weaver's African Methodist Episcopal Church (AME) congregation built Hill's Chapel in 1849. Other churches near the Weaver community included a Baptist church, built in 1854, and a Wesleyan church, built in the 1870s.

== Transportation ==
A gravel road east of Weaver was built in 1869 to replace an earlier corduroy road that linked Liberty Township to Marion, Grant County's seat of government.

== Points of interest ==
Weaver Cemetery remains as a community landmark.

== See also ==
- Carthagena, Ohio
- Chubbtown, Georgia
- Free Hill, Tennessee
- Pee Pee Township, Ohio
- Oberlin Village
- Pocahontas Island
- Rumley, Ohio
- Timbuctoo, New Jersey
