= Hancock County, Tennessee =

County in Tennessee, United States

- County
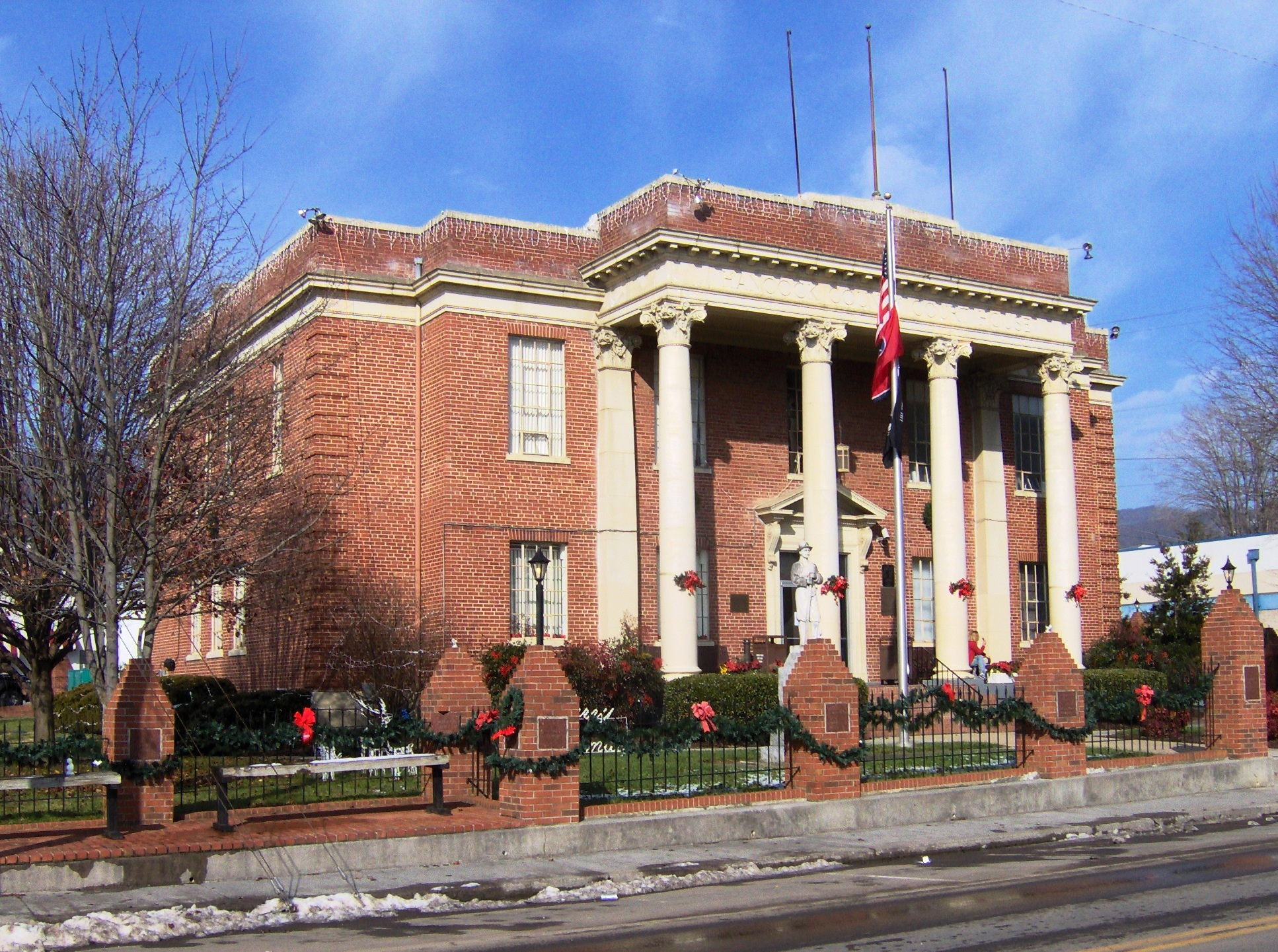
- Hancock County Courthouse in Sneedville

- Flag

- Location within the U.S. state of Tennessee
- Coordinates: 36°32′N 83°13′W
- Country: United States
- State: Tennessee
- Founded: 1844
- Named for: John Hancock
- Seat: Sneedville
- Largest town: Sneedville

Area
  - Total: 223 sq mi (580 km^{2})
  - Land: 222 sq mi (570 km^{2})
  - Water: 1.2 sq mi (3.1 km^{2}) 0.5%

Population (2020)
  - Total: 6,662
  - Estimate (2025): 7,075 ▲
  - Density: 31/sq mi (12/km^{2})
- Time zone: UTC−5 (Eastern)
  - Summer (DST): UTC−4 (EDT)
- Congressional district: 1st
- Website: www.hancockcountytn.com

Hancock County is a county located in the northeastern part of the U.S. state of Tennessee. As of the 2020 census, the population was 6,662, making it the fourth-least populous county in Tennessee. Its county seat is Sneedville.

== History ==
Hancock County was created from parts of Hawkins and Claiborne counties. The act establishing the county was passed by the state legislature in 1844, but several Hawkins residents sued to block its creation. In 1848, the Tennessee Supreme Court ruled in favor of the new county. The county seat, Sneedville, was named in honor of the attorney William H. Sneed, who represented the county in the court case. The county was named after the Revolutionary War patriot John Hancock.

== Geography ==
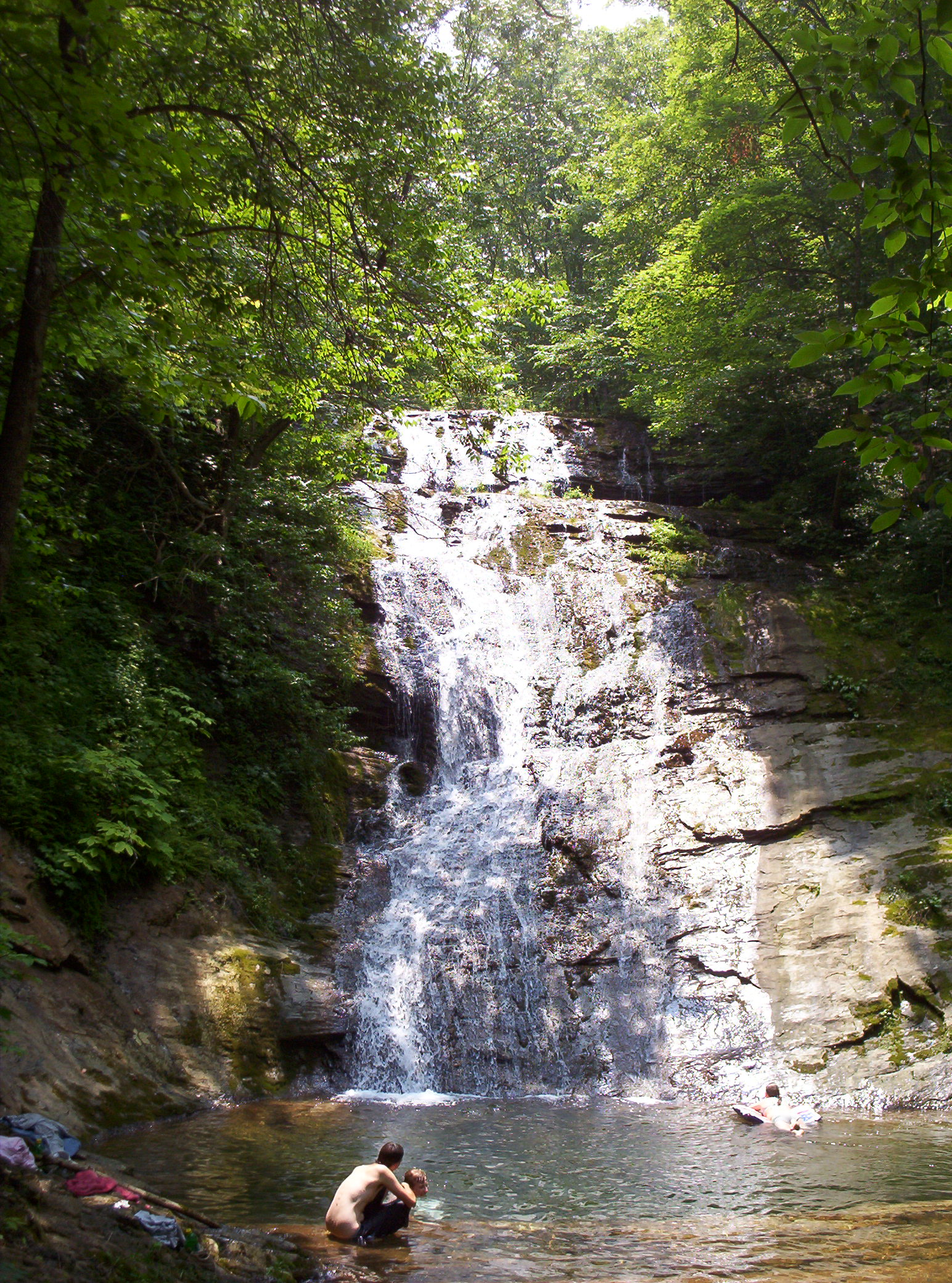
Elrod Falls in Hancock County

According to the U.S. Census Bureau, the county has a total area of 223 square miles (580 km^{2}), of which 222 square miles (570 km^{2}) is land and 1.2 square miles (3.1 km^{2}) (0.5%) is water.

=== Adjacent counties ===
- Lee County, Virginia (north)
- Scott County, Virginia (northeast)
- Hawkins County (east)
- Grainger County (southwest)
- Claiborne County (west)

=== State protected areas ===
- Kyles Ford Wildlife Management Area (part)

=== Major highways ===
There are 3 primary state highways and 4 secondary state highways that run through Hancock County.

- SR 31 (to US 11W/ SR 1 and Hawkins County, northbound from Mooresburg terminates at SR 66 and Main Street.
- SR 33 Main Street (Turns to SR 33 after the fork in Kyles Ford) then becomes SR 600 Flower Gap Road in VA. Southbound to Tazewell and Central Claiborne County)
- SR 63 (To Harrogate and Northern Claiborne County)
- SR 70 (Turns to SR 70 after the fork from SR 33 to the Virginia border. Then it becomes SR 70 in VA. Southbound goes to Rogersville)
- SR 131 (to US 25E/ SR 32 and NE Grainger County)
- Back Valley Rd (Connects downtown Sneedville with other communities with a terminus at SR 33 going towards Tazewell)
- SR 66 (to US 11W/ SR 70/SR 1 northbound from Rogersville terminating at Main Street and SR 31

== Demographics ==
Historical population
Census	Pop.	Note	%±
1850	5,660		—
1860	7,020		24.0%
1870	7,148		1.8%
1880	9,098		27.3%
1890	10,342		13.7%
1900	11,147		7.8%
1910	10,778		−3.3%
1920	10,454		−3.0%
1930	9,673		−7.5%
1940	11,231		16.1%
1950	9,116		−18.8%
1960	7,757		−14.9%
1970	6,719		−13.4%
1980	6,887		2.5%
1990	6,739		−2.1%
2000	6,786		0.7%
2010	6,819		0.5%
2020	6,662		−2.3%
2025 (est.)	7,075	▲	6.2%
U.S. Decennial Census; 1790-1960 1900-1990; 1990-2000 2010-2020 2020

=== Racial and ethnic composition ===
Hancock County, Tennessee – Racial and ethnic composition Note: the US Census treats Hispanic/Latino as an ethnic category. This table excludes Latinos from the racial categories and assigns them to a separate category. Hispanics/Latinos may be of any race.
Race / ethnicity (NH = Non-Hispanic)	Pop 1980	Pop 1990	Pop 2000	Pop 2010	Pop 2020	% 1980	% 1990	% 2000	% 2010	% 2020
White alone (NH)	6,760	6,564	6,625	6,673	6,391	98.16%	97.40%	97.63%	97.86%	95.93%
Black or African American alone (NH)	38	119	33	24	33	0.55%	1.77%	0.49%	0.35%	0.50%
Native American or Alaska Native alone (NH)	3	18	16	19	25	0.04%	0.27%	0.24%	0.28%	0.38%
Asian alone (NH)	4	1	5	7	1	0.06%	0.01%	0.07%	0.10%	0.02%
Native Hawaiian or Pacific Islander alone (NH)	x	x	1	0	0	x	x	0.01%	0.00%	0.00%
Other race alone (NH)	4	2	20	5	11	0.06%	0.03%	0.29%	0.07%	0.17%
Mixed race or Multiracial (NH)	x	x	61	78	161	x	x	0.90%	1.14%	2.42%
Hispanic or Latino (any race)	78	35	25	13	40	1.13%	0.52%	0.37%	0.19%	0.60%
Total	6,887	6,739	6,786	6,819	6,662	100.00%	100.00%	100.00%	100.00%	100.00%

=== 2020 census ===
As of the 2020 census, the county had a population of 6,662, 2,827 households, and 1,729 families. The median age was 45.8 years, with 20.8% of residents under the age of 18 and 21.4% aged 65 years or older. For every 100 females there were 102.1 males, and for every 100 females age 18 and over there were 101.2 males age 18 and over.

As of the 2020 census, the racial makeup of the county was 95.9% White, 0.5% Black or African American, 0.4% American Indian and Alaska Native, <0.1% Asian, <0.1% Native Hawaiian and Pacific Islander, 0.4% from some other race, and 2.7% from two or more races, with Hispanic or Latino residents of any race comprising 0.6% of the population.

As of the 2020 census, <0.1% of residents lived in urban areas, while 100.0% lived in rural areas.

The 2020 census recorded 2,827 households, of which 27.4% had children under the age of 18 living in them. Of all households, 45.3% were married-couple households, 22.1% were households with a male householder and no spouse or partner present, and 27.6% were households with a female householder and no spouse or partner present. About 31.4% of all households were made up of individuals and 14.9% had someone living alone who was 65 years of age or older.

The 2020 census recorded 3,669 housing units, of which 22.9% were vacant. Among occupied housing units, 76.3% were owner-occupied and 23.7% were renter-occupied. The homeowner vacancy rate was 2.0% and the rental vacancy rate was 8.5%.

=== 2010 census ===
At the 2010 census, there were 6,819 people living in the county. 98.0% were White, 0.4% Black or African American, 0.3% Native American, 0.1% Asian, 0.1% of some other race and 1.1% of two or more races. 0.2% were Hispanic or Latino (of any race).

=== 2000 census ===
At the 2000 census, there were 6,786 people, 2,769 households and 1,938 families living in the county. The population density was 30 people per square mile (12 people/km^{2}). There were 3,280 housing units at an average density of 15 units per square mile (5.8/km^{2}). The racial makeup of the county was 97.91% White, 0.49% Black or African American, 0.24% Native American, 0.07% Asian, 0.01% Pacific Islander, 0.34% from other races, and 0.94% from two or more races. 0.37% of the population were Hispanic or Latino of any race.

There were 2,769 households, of which 31.00% had children under the age of 18 living with them, 55.10% were married couples living together, 11.00% had a female householder with no husband present, and 30.00% were non-families. 27.70% of all households were made up of individuals, and 13.50% had someone living alone who was 65 years of age or older. The average household size was 2.39 and the average family size was 2.91.

23.10% of the population were under the age of 18, 8.80% from 18 to 24, 26.90% from 25 to 44, 25.50% from 45 to 64, and 15.70% who were 65 years of age or older. The median age was 39 years. For every 100 females there were 95.10 males. For every 100 females age 18 and over, there were 94.30 males.

The median household income was $19,760, which was the lowest median household income of any county in Tennessee, and the 27th lowest in the United States. The median family income was $25,372. Males had a median income of $23,150 and females $18,199. The per capita income was $11,986. About 25.30% of families and 29.40% of the population were below the poverty line, including 37.50% of those under age 18 and 30.70% of those age 65 or over.

The county as of the fiscal year 2020, was designated as an "economically distressed" area by the state government, and is one of the poorest in the state. Hancock County is estimated to experience a massive population decline.

== Culture ==
Hancock County is known particularly for its population of people of Melungeon ancestry, who are believed to be of mixed European, African, and Native American heritage. The Vardy Community School, which provided state-mandated education for Melungeon children in the early 20th century, is now a historic site located in the Newman's Ridge area.

== Communities ==
=== City ===
- Sneedville (county seat)

=== Unincorporated communities ===
- Alanthus Hill
- Kyles Ford
- Mulberry Gap
- Treadway
- Xenophon

== Politics ==
United States presidential election results for Hancock County, Tennessee
Year	Republican		Democratic		Third party(ies)	
Year	No.	%	No.	%	No.	%
1912	659	56.32%	427	36.50%	84	7.18%
1916	1,229	76.10%	386	23.90%	0	0.00%
1920	1,740	81.92%	384	18.08%	0	0.00%
1924	1,028	76.72%	305	22.76%	7	0.52%
1928	1,039	82.79%	216	17.21%	0	0.00%
1932	1,089	66.40%	551	33.60%	0	0.00%
1936	1,673	63.54%	960	36.46%	0	0.00%
1940	1,673	61.94%	1,014	37.54%	14	0.52%
1944	1,929	81.60%	431	18.23%	4	0.17%
1948	1,598	77.38%	416	20.15%	51	2.47%
1952	1,830	79.50%	458	19.90%	14	0.61%
1956	1,939	83.29%	350	15.03%	39	1.68%
1960	2,107	82.56%	438	17.16%	7	0.27%
1964	1,517	68.83%	687	31.17%	0	0.00%
1968	1,489	72.88%	318	15.57%	236	11.55%
1972	1,813	81.59%	393	17.69%	16	0.72%
1976	1,309	62.63%	764	36.56%	17	0.81%
1980	1,734	69.72%	704	28.31%	49	1.97%
1984	1,491	69.87%	619	29.01%	24	1.12%
1988	1,303	62.58%	737	35.40%	42	2.02%
1992	1,274	52.02%	1,000	40.83%	175	7.15%
1996	1,259	58.45%	760	35.28%	135	6.27%
2000	1,343	64.72%	690	33.25%	42	2.02%
2004	1,756	68.84%	777	30.46%	18	0.71%
2008	1,588	70.86%	604	26.95%	49	2.19%
2012	1,527	74.63%	475	23.22%	44	2.15%
2016	1,843	82.61%	322	14.43%	66	2.96%
2020	2,372	86.44%	362	13.19%	10	0.36%
2024	2,558	87.96%	334	11.49%	16	0.55%

Like all of Unionist East Tennessee, Hancock County has been overwhelmingly Republican since the Civil War. Since the Republican Party first contested the state in 1868, every official Republican nominee has gained an absolute majority of Hancock County's vote, even William Howard Taft during 1912 when the GOP was bitterly divided. The only post-Civil War Democratic presidential nominee to even reach forty percent of Hancock County's vote has been Bill Clinton in 1992, when he was aided by the local popularity of Senator Al Gore, a Smith County native.

== Education ==
There is one school district in the county, Hancock County School District.

== See also ==
- National Register of Historic Places listings in Hancock County, Tennessee
