= Free African Americans of North Carolina, Virginia, and South Carolina from the Colonial Period to About 1820 =

Genealogical work on free African-Americans

- Cover of the 6th edition, Volume I
- Author: Paul Heinegg
- Subject: African-American genealogy
- Publisher: Genealogical Publishing Co., Clearfield Company
- Publication date: 1992 (1st ed.); 2021 (6th ed.)
- Publication place: Baltimore, MD
- Awards: Donald Lines Jacobus Award, Award of Excellence in Publishing (Note: From the North Carolina Genealogical Society.)
- ISBN: 978-0-806-35921-2 (6th ed.)
- LC Class: E185.96
- Website: freeafricanamericans.com

Free African Americans of North Carolina, Virginia, and South Carolina from the Colonial Period to About 1820 is a work on African-American genealogy by Paul Heinegg. It was first published in 1992, and the sixth edition was published in 2021. It documents over 80% of people recorded under 'all other free persons' on the 1790 and 1800 United States censuses.

One main thesis of the text is that white slaveowners were not prominent in the origins of free African-American families within the states of Virginia, North Carolina, and South Carolina.

== Background ==
In the work, Heinegg writes that most free people of color in the states covered (Note: Heinegg published an additional work, Free African Americans of Maryland and Delaware, where he wrote of a similar pattern occurring in those states.) descended from white indentured servant women. He also writes that they mostly descend from unions of these women with slaves or free African Americans.

Out of the 400 families surveyed in one edition, he said 163 descended from white women, while three descended from white slaveowning men. Heinegg writes that these families were a major part of the free population after the colonial era, due to natural increase. He additionally documents most free Black people in North Carolina descending from individuals in Virginia.

The work is also available online at www.freeafricanamericans.com, with supplemental colonial tax lists and census records.

=== Contents ===
The foreword was written by Ira Berlin. An introduction covers historical context, societal trends, and detailed information about specific African-American families.

The work documents over 80% of those recorded under 'all other free persons' on the first two United States censuses. The sixth edition covers 541 free African-American families in three volumes. Some families documented are the Africa, Ashworth, Bunch (Note: Traced to Ralph Bunche in the work.), Braveboy, Cumbo, Cuffee, Chavis, Collins, Demery, Driggers, Longo, Johnson, Fortune, Gowen, Gibson, Mozingo, Nickens, Payne, and Weaver families.

=== Reception ===
The work has been received positively by historians Ira Berlin and Virginia DeMarce. It received awards from the North Carolina Genealogical Society and the American Society of Genealogists.

== See also ==
- African Americans in North Carolina § Free Black people
- African Americans in South Carolina § Free persons of color
- African burial grounds and historic African American cemeteries of Richmond, Virginia
- African Origins
- Book of Negroes
- History of slavery in Virginia § Freedom
- Voyages: The Trans-Atlantic Slave Trade Database
