= The Other Madisons (book) =

2020 memoir by Bettye Kearse

- Book Cover First Edition
- Author: Bettye Kearse
- Language: English
- Subject: African-American history, Memoir, James Madison, Oral tradition
- Genre: Memoir, Non-fiction
- Publisher: Houghton Mifflin Harcourt
- Publication date: 2020
- Publication place: United States
- Media type: Hardcover, E-book
- Awards: International Afro-American Historical and Genealogical Book Award for Nonfiction, Autobiography
- ISBN: 978-1-328-60439-2 (hardcover)
- LC Class: E342.1 .K43 2020

The Other Madisons is a 2020 memoir by Bettye Kearse, published by Houghton Mifflin Harcourt. The full title is The Other Madisons: The Lost History of a President's Black Family. The book explores the author's family history and oral tradition claiming descent from President James Madison and an enslaved woman named Coreen.

== Synopsis ==
The memoir opens with a traditional West African griot chant and establishes Kearse's role as griotte, the eighth-generation female storyteller for her family since 1990. Kearse explains that griots and griottes serve as "human links between past and present," preserving not just family histories but entire cultures and values. She traces this oral tradition back to her family's first "wordsmith," an enslaved woman called Mandy, whose voice Kearse describes as sounding "like a xylophone: precise, clear, musical" with inflections of the Ga language of Ghana. Kearse recounts the oral tradition passed down through generations that she is a descendant of President James Madison and his enslaved cook and half-sister, Coreen. As an African American pediatrician turned historical detective, Kearse investigates her family's history and, by extension, that of America, noting that while slave owners "successfully abolished many African customs," the tradition of oral history has held strong in African-American families like hers.

The book is structured with 18 numbered chapters interwoven with sections titled "Mandy," which represent the first-person narrative of the family's ancestral enslaved woman. Mandy is captured from her coastal village and enslaved, transported through the Middle Passage, sexual assault by "Massa," and witnesses the abuse of her daughter Coreen. The other chapters discuss the process of historical recovery.

== Accuracy ==
Cousins of Kearse have claimed to not be aware of the alleged family oral-history before she gave a presentation on it at a family gathering in 2014. No documentary evidence attests to the existence of Coreen, and DNA test results from Ancestry.com show no connection between Kearse and Madison relatives.

== Publication ==
The book was published in 2020 by Houghton Mifflin Harcourt. The hardcover edition (ISBN 978-1-328-60439-2) and ebook edition (ISBN ISBN 978-1-328-60353-1) were catalogued by the Library of Congress under classification number E342.1 .K43 2020.

== Reception ==
Kirkus Reviews gave the book a starred review, calling it "A Roots for a new generation, rich in storytelling and steeped in history." Library Journal also awarded it a starred review, describing it as "A moving, beautifully told story that adds to our understanding of Madison along with African American genealogy and oral history." Booklist called it "A compelling saga that gives a voice to those that history tried to erase . . . Poignant and eye-opening".

== See also ==
- The Other Madisons (film)
- James Madison
- African-American genealogy
- Oral tradition
- Griot
- Slavery in the United States

== Bibliography ==
Kearse, Bettye (2020). The Other Madisons: The Lost History of a President's Black Family. Boston: Houghton Mifflin Harcourt. ISBN 978-1-328-60439-2.
