= Voyages: The Trans-Atlantic Slave Trade Database =

Database at Emory University

Voyages: The Trans-Atlantic Slave Trade Database is a database hosted at Rice University that aims to present all documentary material pertaining to the transatlantic slave trade. It is a sister project to African Origins.

The database breaks down the kingdoms and countries that engaged in the Atlantic trade.

Participation in the trans-Atlantic slave trade
Country	Enslaved persons
Portugal	5,848,266
Great Britain	3,259,441
France	1,381,404
Spain	1,061,524
Netherlands	554,336
United States	305,326
Denmark	111,040

By 2008, the project had gathered data on nearly 35,000 transatlantic slave voyages from 1501 to 1867. For each voyage they sought to establish dates, owners, vessels, captains, African visits, American destinations, numbers of slaves embarked, and numbers landed. They have been able to find much of this material for an estimated 80 percent of the entire transatlantic African slave trade. With corrections for missing voyages, the Project has estimated the entire size of the transatlantic slave trade with more comprehension, precision, and accuracy than before. They reckon that in 366 years, slaving vessels embarked about 12.5 million captives in Africa, and landed 10.7 million in the New World. A horrific discovery is a careful estimate that the Middle Passage took a toll of more than 1.8 million African lives. In this quantitative database, the numbers are enslaved people.

== See also ==
- The 1619 Project
- Free African Americans of North Carolina, Virginia, and South Carolina from the Colonial Period to About 1820
