= Alanthus Hill, Tennessee =

Unincorporated community in Tennessee, US

Coordinates: 36°33′55″N 83°23′30″W

Alanthus Hill is an unincorporated community in Hancock County, Tennessee, in the United States.

== History ==
A post office called Alanthus Hill was established in 1855, and remained in operation until it was discontinued in 1935. The community may have been named for an Ailanthus altissima, commonly known as the tree of heaven, growing atop a nearby summit.
