= Newman Ridge =

Ridge in Hancock County, Tennessee, United States

Highest point
- Coordinates: 36.551477°N 83.234065°W

Geography
- Location: Tennessee, United States

Newman Ridge is a ridge in the U.S. state of Tennessee.

Newman Ridge was named after a pioneer who explored the area in the 1760s.

Historically, Newman Ridge has been home to a population of Melungeons.

== See also ==
- Sneedville, Tennessee
