= Melungeon =

Mixed-race group from the South Central Appalachian region of the United States

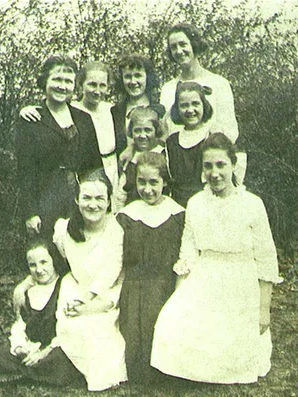
- Melungeon girls from Vardy, Tennessee around 1916 in front of the Melungeon boarding school in Asheville, North Carolina.

Regions with significant populations
- United States (East Tennessee, Southwest Virginia, North Carolina, and Kentucky)

Languages
- Southern American English, Appalachian English

Religion
- Predominantly Protestant Christianity

Related ethnic groups
- Affrilachians, Carmel Melungeons, Chestnut Ridge people, Lumbee, Pee Dee Lumbee, Atlantic Creole, Turks of South Carolina, Dominickers, Redbone (ethnicity), Appalachians

Melungeon (/məˈlʌndʒən/ mə-LUN-jən) (sometimes also spelled Malungean, Melangean, Melungean, Melungin) is a reclaimed term historically applied to mixed-race individuals and families and their descendants with roots in colonial Virginia, Tennessee, Kentucky, and North Carolina who were primarily descended from early European and African interracial relationships. In the late 20th century, the term was reclaimed by descendants of these families, especially in southern Appalachia.

Prior to the 1960s, no individual or family identified as Melungeon. However, in the 1990s, individuals descended from mixed-race families began identifying with the term. This process has been defined by Melissa Schrift as an identity relying or built on popular culture, media narratives, and myths.

Researcher Paul Heinegg, who compiled thousands of pages and oral histories documenting early free black families, believed the Melungeons to be the product of free blacks marrying white women during the colonial period before racial attitudes and laws intensified.

Some modern researchers, such as Ira Berlin, write that early Atlantic Creole slaves were one of the precursor populations to these groups. Many creoles, once in British America, were able to obtain their freedom and many married into local white families.

Descendants vehemently denied their African ancestry for generations and had existed as an group deemed "not white enough" by their predominately European-descended neighbors. Despite this, a common feature of these families and groups was their refusal to be associated with or integrate into black communities. This can be traced back to their free black forebearers, who often explicitly integrated into white communities, and married white women.

== Etymology ==
The term Melungeon likely comes from the French word mélange ultimately derived from the Latin verb miscēre ("to mix, mingle, intermingle"). It was once a derogatory term, but later became used by the Melungeon people as a primary identifier. The Tennessee Encyclopedia states that in the 19th century, "the word 'Melungeon' appears to have been used as an offensive term for nonwhite and/or low socioeconomic class persons by outsiders."

The term Melungeon was historically considered an insult, a label applied to Appalachians who were by appearance or reputation of mixed-race ancestry. Although initially pejorative in character, this word has been reclaimed by members of the community. The spelling of the term varied widely, as was common for words and names at the time.

=== Early uses ===
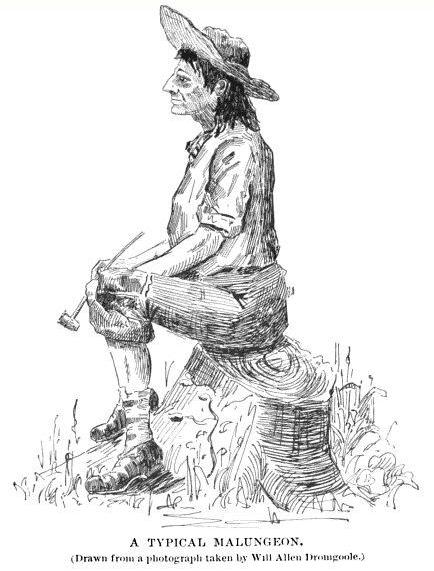
"A Typical Malungeon" (1890) by Will Allen Dromgoole

The earliest historical record of the term Melungeon dates to 1813. In the minutes of the Stoney Creek Baptist Church in Scott County, Virginia, a woman stated another parishioner made the accusation that "she harbored them Melungins." The second oldest written use of the term was in 1840, when a Tennessee politician described "an impudent Melungeon" from what became Washington, D.C., as being "a scoundrel who is half Negro and half Indian." In the 1890s, during the age of yellow journalism, the term "Melungeon" started to circulate and be reproduced in U.S. newspapers, when the journalist Will Allen Dromgoole wrote several articles on the Melungeons.

== History ==
=== Colonial and Antebellum eras ===
Free people of color in colonial Virginia were predominantly of African and European descent; however, some families also had Native American and East Indian heritage.

=== Civil War to Nadir of American race relations ===
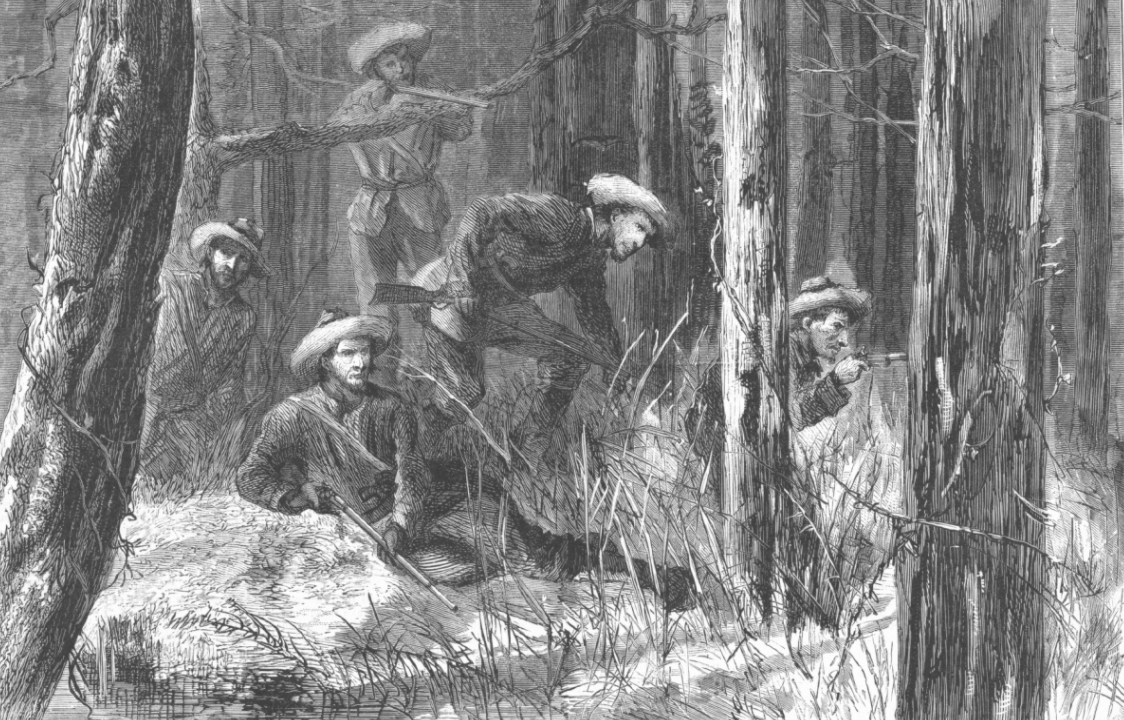
Depiction of Henry Berry Lowry and members of his gang in a Robeson County swamp during the Lowry War

Many free people of color, white-passing or otherwise, served in the American Civil War on both sides of the conflict. Some served in the Confederate military, though others resisted the Confederate government, such as Henry Berry Lowry. As part of the 1st Tennessee Cavalry Regiment in the Battle of Nashville, Harrison Collins was the first Union soldier from Tennessee to be awarded the Congressional Medal of Honor for heroism.

In 1894, the US Department of the Interior, in its "Report of Indians Taxed and Not Taxed," under the section "Tennessee" noted:

In a number of states small groups of people, preferring the freedom of the woods or the seashore to the confinement of regular labor in civilization, have become in some degree distinct from their neighbors, perpetuating their qualities and absorbing into their number those of like disposition, without preserving very clear racial lines. Such are the remnants called Indians in some states where a pure-blooded Indian can hardly longer be found. In Tennessee is such a group, popularly known as Melungeans, in addition to those still known as Cherokees. The name seems to have been given them by early French settlers, who recognized their mixed origin and applied to them the name Melangeans or Melungeans, a corruption of the French word "melange" which means mixed. (See letter of Hamilton McMillan, under North Carolina.)

According to the 1894 Department of Interior Report of Indians Taxed and not Taxed within the "Tennessee" report, "The civilized (self-supporting) Indians of Tennessee, counted in the general census numbered 146 (71 males and 75 females) and are distributed as follows: Hawkins county, 31; Monroe county, 12; Polk county, 10; other counties (8 or less in each), 93. Quoting from the report:

The Melungeans or Malungeans, in Hawkins county, claim to be Cherokees of mixed blood (white, Indian, and negro), their white blood being derived, as they assert, from English and Portuguese stock. They trace their descent primarily to 2 Indians (Cherokees) known, one of them as Collins, the other as Gibson, who settled in the mountains of Tennessee, where their descendants are now to be found, about the time of the admission of that state into the Union (1796).

=== Jim Crow era ===
In 1924, Virginia passed the Racial Integrity Act that codified hypodescent or the "one-drop rule, suggesting that anyone with any trace of African ancestry was legally Black and would fall under Jim Crow laws designed to limit the freedoms and rights of Black people. Anti-miscegenation laws in the United States were not declared unconstitutional until the 1967 Loving v. Virginia case.

In December 1943, Walter Ashby Plecker of Virginia sent county officials a letter warning against "colored" families trying to pass as "white" or "Indian" in violation of the Racial Integrity Act of 1924. He identified these as being "chiefly Tennessee Melungeons". He directed the offices to reclassify members of certain families as black, causing the loss for numerous families of documentation in records that showed their continued self-identification as being of Native American descent on official forms.

Despite often being able to pass as white people, Melungeons were affected by the one-drop rule. The one-drop rule either caused, or had the potential to cause, many Melungeons to be labeled as non-white. Some Melungeons who were labeled as non-white were sterilized by state governments, most notably in Plecker's Virginia.

In the 20th century, during the Jim Crow era, some Melungeons attended boarding schools in Asheville, North Carolina, Warren Wilson College, and Dorland Institution which integrated earlier than other schools in the southern United States.

=== Modern ===
Anthropologist E. Raymond Evans wrote in 1979 regarding Melungeons: "In Graysville, the Melungeons strongly deny their Black heritage and explain their genetic differences by claiming to have had Cherokee grandmothers. Many of the local Whites also claim Cherokee ancestry and appear to accept the Melungeon claim. ..."

Jack D. Forbes speculated that the Melungeons may have been Saponi/Powhatan descendants, although he acknowledges an account from circa 1890 described them as being "free colored" and mulatto people.

In 1999, historian C. S. Everett hypothesized that John Collins (recorded as a Saponi Indian who was expelled from Orange County, Virginia about January 1743), might be the same man as the Melungeon ancestor John Collins, who was classified as a "mulatto" in 1755 North Carolina records. However, Everett revised that theory after he discovered evidence that these were two different men named John Collins. Only descendants of the latter man, who was identified as mulatto in the 1755 record in North Carolina, have any proven connection to the Melungeon families of eastern Tennessee.

== Identity ==
Due to the binary nature of race in the United States, free people of color could be described as white, black, or mulatto regardless of their exact genetic makeup. This resulted in families being split along racial lines; those of more European appearance and ancestry assimilated into the wider white population, while those with predominately African features and ancestry assimilated into the black population. Historically, some Melungeons passed as white, while others did not. In the modern era, some Melungeons identify as White, while others identify as Black or neither.

=== Genetic testing ===
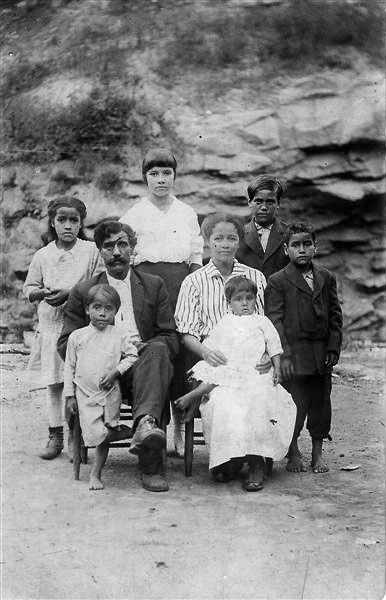
Melungeon Goins and family (probably Elijah Goins, Arch Goins' brother) from Graysville, Tennessee

From 2005 to 2011, researchers Roberta J. Estes, Jack H. Goins, Penny Ferguson, and Janet Lewis Crain began the Melungeon Core Y-DNA Group online. They interpreted these results in their (2011) paper titled "Melungeons, A Multi-Ethnic Population", which shows that ancestry of the sample is primarily European and African, with one person having a Native American paternal haplotype.

Estes, Goins, Ferguson, and Crain wrote in their 2011 summary "Melungeons, A Multi-Ethnic Population" that the Riddle family is the only Melungeon participant with historical records identifying them as having Native American origins, but their DNA is European. Among the participants, only the Sizemore family is documented as having Native American DNA. "Estes and her fellow researchers "theorize that the various Melungeon lines may have sprung from the unions of black and white indentured servants living in Virginia in the mid-1600s. They conclude that as laws were put in place to penalize the mixing of races, the various family groups could only intermarry with each other, even migrating together from Virginia through the Carolinas before settling primarily in the mountains of East Tennessee."

=== Myths ===
Dispute regarding the origin of Melungeons families has led to a large number of ahistorical and dubious myths regarding their origins. Some myths involve physical characteristics and genetic diseases that are claimed to indicate Melungeon descent, such as shovel-shaped incisors, an Anatolian bump, Familial Mediterranean fever, polydactyly, dark skin with bright-colored eyes, and high cheekbones.

Other myths claim that the Melungeons are descendants of lost Spanish colonists, marooned Portuguese sailors, descendants of the ancient Israelites or Phoenicians, Romani slaves, or Turkish settlers.

Since the mid-1990s, popular interest in the Melungeons has grown tremendously, although many descendants have left the region of historical concentration. The writer Bill Bryson devoted the better part of a chapter to them in his The Lost Continent (1989). People are increasingly self-identifying as having Melungeon ancestry. Internet sites promote the anecdotal claim that Melungeons are more prone to certain diseases, such as sarcoidosis or familial Mediterranean fever. Academic medical centers have noted that neither of those diseases is confined to a single population.

== Families ==
Map of Goins families, 1790–1830, with racial census data included.

Definitions of who is Melungeon differ. Historians and genealogists have tried to identify surnames of different Melungeon families. In 1943, Virginia State Registrar of Vital Statistics, Walter Ashby Plecker, identified surnames by county: "Lee, Smyth and Wise: Collins, Gibson, (Gipson), Moore, Wolffs, Goins, Ramsey, Delph, Bunch, Freeman, Mise, Barlow, Bolden (Bolin), Mullins, Hawkins (chiefly Tennessee Melungeons)".

In 1992, Virginia DeMarce explored and reported the Goins genealogy as a Melungeon surname. Genealogical evidence indicates the Goins/Going/Gowen family directly descends from John Graweere (Gowen) and Margaret Cornish, two of the First Africans in Virginia. Beginning in the early 19th century, or possibly before, the term Melungeon was applied as a slur to a group of about 40 families along the Tennessee-Virginia border, but it has since become a catch-all phrase for a number of groups of mysterious mixed-race ancestry. Through time the term has changed meanings but often referred to any mixed-race person and, at different times, has referred to 200 different communities across the Eastern United States. These have included Van Guilders and Clappers of New York and Lumbees in North Carolina to Creoles in Louisiana.

Many groups have historically been referred to as Melungeon, including the Melungeons of Newman's Ridge, the Lumbee, the Chestnut Ridge people, and the Carmel Melungeons.

== See also ==
- Affrilachians
- Alabama Cajans
  - MOWA Band of Choctaw Indians
- Brandywine people
  - Piscataway Indian Nation and Tayac Territory
  - Piscataway-Conoy Tribe of Maryland
- Carmel Melungeons
- Ben-Ishmael Tribe
- Chestnut Ridge people of West Virginia
- Croatan
- Delaware Moors
  - Lenape Indian Tribe of Delaware
  - Nanticoke Indian Association
  - Nanticoke Lenni-Lenape Tribal Nation
- Dominickers in the Florida Panhandle
- John Punch (slave)
- List of topics related to the African diaspora
- Lumbee
  - Lumbee Tribe of North Carolina
- Margaret Cornish
- Pardo
- Ramapough Mountain People ("Jackson Whites")
- Redbones
- South Asians in Colonial America
- Turks of South Carolina
  - Sumter Tribe of Cheraw Indians
- Vardy Community School
- Weaver family (Virginia)
