= Sneedville, Tennessee =

Sneedville
- City
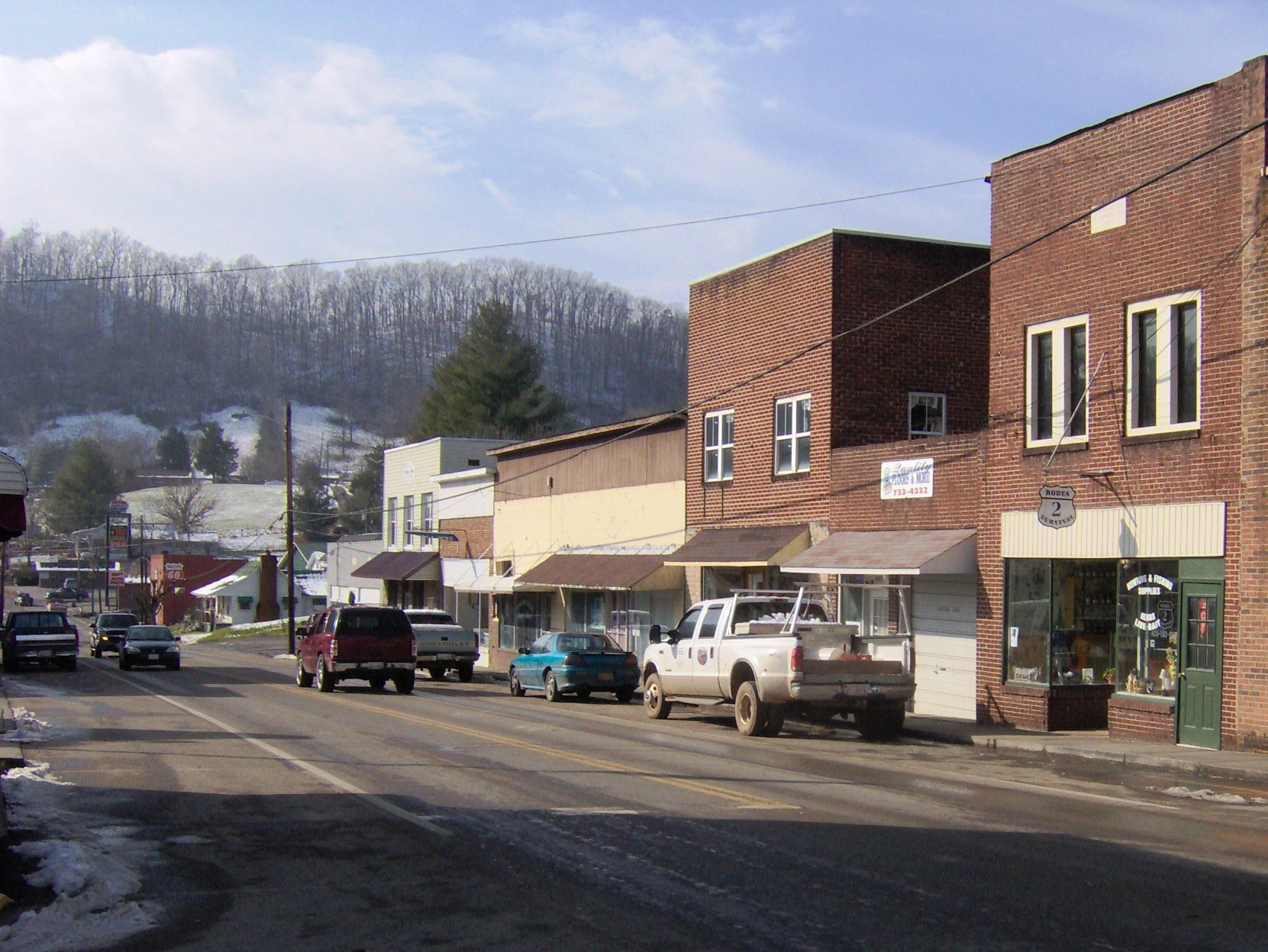
- Main Street (TN-33) in Sneedville
- Nickname: Overhome
- Location of Sneedville in Hancock County, Tennessee.
- Coordinates: 36°31′55″N 83°12′51″W
- Country: United States
- State: Tennessee
- County: Hancock
- Settled: 1790s
- Incorporated: 1850
- Named for: William Henry Sneed

Government
  - Type: Mayor-council
  - Mayor: William Riley
  - Vice Mayor: Matthew Waddell

Area
  - Total: 2.30 sq mi (5.95 km^{2})
  - Land: 2.30 sq mi (5.95 km^{2})
  - Water: 0 sq mi (0.00 km^{2})
- Elevation: 1,171 ft (357 m)

Population (2020)
  - Total: 1,282
  - Density: 558/sq mi (215.5/km^{2})
- Time zone: UTC-5 (Eastern (EST))
  - Summer (DST): UTC-4 (EDT)
- ZIP code: 37869
- Area code: 423
- FIPS code: 47-69460
- GNIS feature ID: 1303706
- Website: www.hancockcountytn.com/Sneedville-City-Government.php

Sneedville is the only city in and the county seat of Hancock County, Tennessee, United States. The population was 1,282 per the 2020 census.

== History ==
Settlement began in the 1790s, following the American Revolutionary War, as migrants moved into the area from the Piedmont frontiers of Virginia and North Carolina. Such migrants had formed families in colonial Virginia. Among them was a biracial group of settlers who became known as Melungeons. They have been documented as having primarily European and Black African ancestry.

The county historical society asserts that French traders noted encountering the Melungeons in the late 1600s in the area that is now east Tennessee. Such early settlement is not supported by the research of Edward Price, a cultural geographer who wrote a 1950 dissertation on the Melungeons; Dr. Virginia DeMarce, a professional genealogist; and Paul Heinegg, a genealogist; each of whom has documented the migration of ancestors of the first families known as Melungeon from Virginia and North Carolina in the late eighteenth century.

When Hancock County was formed from parts of Hawkins and Claiborne counties in the 1840s, Greasy Rock was chosen as the county seat. The city was renamed in honor of William Henry Sneed (1812–1869), a Confederate and attorney from Knoxville who helped legally defend the new county when several residents sued in an attempt to block its creation.

== Geography ==
Sneedville is located at 36°31′55″N 83°12′51″W (36.532062, -83.214140).

According to the United States Census Bureau, the city has a total area of 2.3 square miles (6.0 km^{2}), all land. The Clinch River passes within the city limits.

=== Climate ===
According to the Köppen climate classification, Sneedville has a humid subtropical climate, typical for Tennessee. The plant hardiness zone is 6b.

== Demographics ==
Historical population
Census	Pop.	Note	%±
1870	177		—
1880	157		−11.3%
1890	156		−0.6%
1960	799		—
1970	874		9.4%
1980	1,110		27.0%
1990	1,446		30.3%
2000	1,257		−13.1%
2010	1,387		10.3%
2020	1,282		−7.6%

=== 2020 census ===
Sneedville town, Tennessee – Racial composition
Race (NH = Non-Hispanic)	2020	2010	2000	1990	1980
White alone (NH)	93.5% (1,199)	97.1% (1,347)	97.5% (1,225)	92.2% (1,333)	97.8% (1,086)
Black alone (NH)	1.4% (18)	0.6% (8)	0.6% (8)	6.7% (97)	0% (0)
American Indian alone (NH)	0.9% (11)	0.3% (4)	0.2% (2)	0.5% (7)	0.3% (3)
Asian alone (NH)	0.1% (1)	0.1% (1)	0% (0)	0% (0)	
Pacific Islander alone (NH)	0% (0)	0% (0)	0% (0)		
Other race alone (NH)	0.3% (4)	0% (0)	0.7% (9)	0.1% (1)	
Multiracial (NH)	3.1% (40)	1.7% (23)	0.8% (10)	—	—
Hispanic/Latino (any race)	0.7% (9)	0.3% (4)	0.2% (3)	0.6% (8)	1.9% (21)

As of the 2020 United States census, there were 1,282 people, 573 households, and 369 families residing in the town.

=== 2010 census ===
As of the 2010 United States census, there were 1,387 people living in the city. 97.4% were White, 0.6% Black or African American, 0.3% Native American, 0.1% Asian and 1.7% of two or more races. 0.3% were Hispanic or Latino (of any race).

=== 2000 census ===
As of the census of 2000, there were 1,257 people, 527 households, and 310 families living in the city. The population density was 551.0 inhabitants per square mile (212.7/km^{2}). There were 593 housing units at an average density of 259.9 per square mile (100.3/km^{2}). The racial makeup of the town was 97.69% White, 0.64% African American, 0.16% Native American, 0.72% from other races, and 0.80% from two or more races. Hispanic or Latino of any race were 0.24% of the population. Melungeons, a so-called "racial isolate", are also present in this area, especially in the Vardy Valley, on the other side of Newman's Ridge.

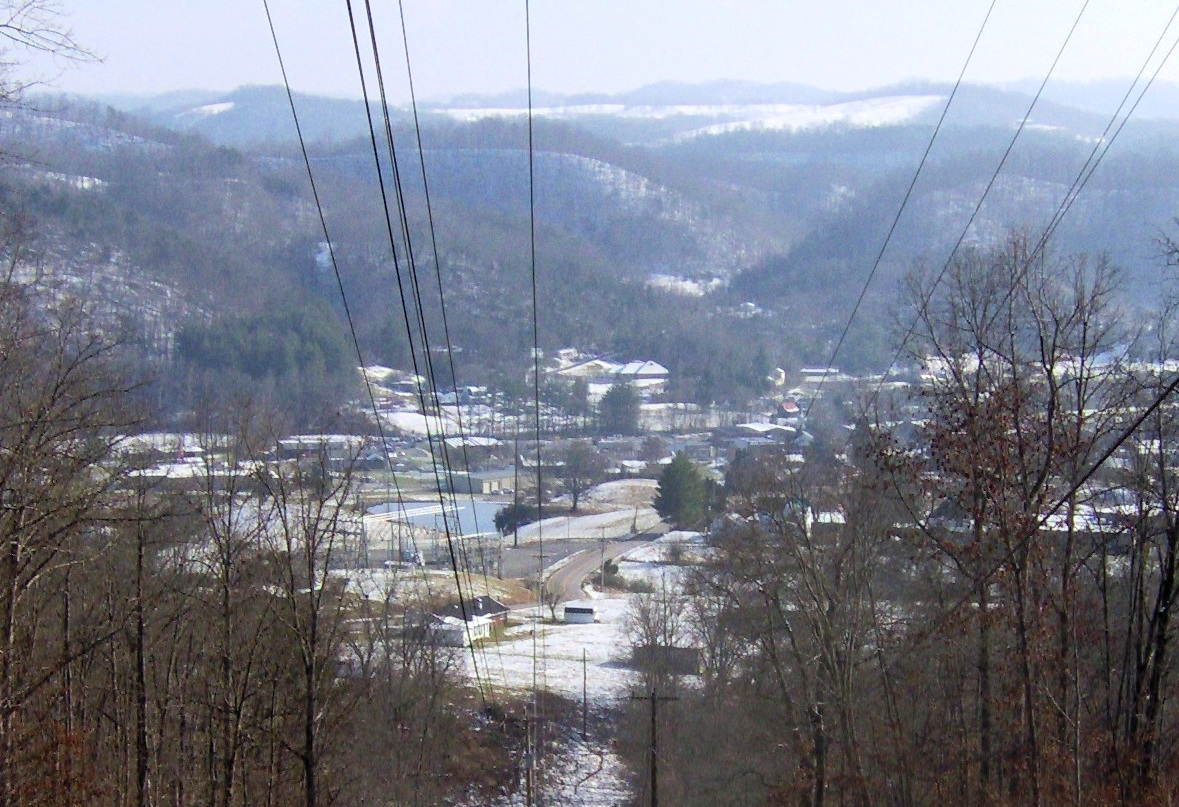
Sneedville, viewed from Newmans Ridge

There were 527 households, out of which 27.1% had children under the age of 18 living with them, 41.2% were married couples living together, 14.6% had a female householder with no husband present, and 41.0% were non-families. 38.9% of all households were made up of individuals, and 18.6% had someone living alone who was 65 years of age or older. The average household size was 2.08 and the average family size was 2.77.

In the city, the population was spread out, with 18.4% under the age of 18, 11.4% from 18 to 24, 28.2% from 25 to 44, 23.5% from 45 to 64, and 18.5% who were 65 years of age or older. The median age was 40 years. For every 100 females, there were 93.7 males. For every 100 females age 18 and over, there were 96.9 males.

The median income for a household in the city was $13,281, and the median income for a family was $20,208. Males had a median income of $20,500 versus $15,461 for females. The per capita income for the town was $13,173. About 32.9% of families and 36.3% of the population were below the poverty line, including 46.9% of those under age 18 and 28.4% of those age 65 or over.

In 2010, Sneedville had the 10th-lowest median household income of all places in the United States with a population over 1,000.

== Arts and culture ==
=== Museums and related points of interest ===
The Hancock County Tennessee Historical and Genealogical Society is a non-profit organization located in the Old County Jail. The organization provides access to archival material related to the community and maintains a small museum displaying aspects of traditional mountain life, such as was practiced by the Melungeons. They publish a bi-yearly newsletter called Our Mountain Heritage for members of the society.

== Education ==
There is one school district in the county, Hancock County School District.

Schools in Sneedville include Hancock County Middle/High School and Hancock County Elementary School.

== Infrastructure ==
Hancock County Hospital, which opened in 2005, is located in Sneedville.

== Notable people ==
- Charlie Johns - tobacco farmer, received national attention when he married his 9-year-old neighbor in Sneedville, where he lived on a 50-acre property
- Doyle Lawson — musician, lived in Sneedville as a child
- Jimmy Martin — musician; born in Sneedville, dubbed "King of Bluegrass" and inducted into the International Bluegrass Music Hall of Honor
- Morgan Wallen — multi-platinum country music artist
- Eunice Winstead - 9-year-old girl from Sneedville who received national notoriety when she became the child bride of her adult neighbor Charlie Johns

== See also ==
- Vardy Community School
