= Anita L. Wills =

American author and historian

Anita L. Wills (born September 20, 1946) is an American author, historian, and social advocate known for her contributions to African American genealogy and historical preservation. She is recognized for documenting the lives of free persons of color, African American families, and abolitionist movements throughout American history.

== Early life and education ==
Anita L. Wills was born on September 20, 1946, in Coatesville, Pennsylvania, and spent her early years there and in Berks County, Pennsylvania. Her father, George Baxter, served in World War II as a military policeman and later worked at the Veterans Affairs hospital. He was monitored during the 1940s and 1950s under suspicions of communist affiliations due to his fluency in German and Russian.

Her mother, Vivian Martin Baxter, served as the family historian and inspired Wills to research their Native American and African American heritage. Through genealogical research, Wills connected her lineage to the Iroquois Confederacy and became a member of the Monacan Indian Nation, a federally recognized tribe in Virginia.

In 1998, Wills successfully demonstrated her lineage to Charles Lewis, a Revolutionary War soldier, earning membership in the Daughters of the American Revolution.

== Career ==
Wills's writing focuses on African American genealogy and marginalized histories. Her notable works include Notes and Documents of Free Persons of Color (2011), which reconstructs the lives of free African Americans in Colonial Virginia. In Along the Rappahannock (2017), Wills examines African American families in the Rappahannock region of Virginia, blending genealogical findings with historical context.

Her work also highlights African American soldiers in the Civil War, particularly those trained at Camp William Penn, the first federal training camp for Black soldiers. Wills's book Black Minqua: The Life and Times of Henry Green explores the Christiana Resistance, a significant abolitionist event in 1851 in Lancaster County, Pennsylvania. Her ancestors were among the abolitionists who defended escaped slaves against Edward Gorsuch, a Maryland slaveholder. The incident culminated in a treason trial supported by Frederick Douglass and Thaddeus Stevens, resulting in acquittals for those involved.

== Advocacy and public engagement ==
Wills is also a vocal advocate for social justice, focusing on elder abuse and parole reform. She volunteers with organizations like *Parole Elder Abuse*, addressing systemic challenges affecting older individuals in the criminal justice system.

Her public engagement includes a feature in The New Yorker documentary, A Son's Note from Prison: Your Love is a Verb, which highlights her advocacy against contemporary systems of incarceration. She has also appeared on platforms like C-SPAN to discuss her work and books.

== Institutional recognition ==
Wills's book Notes and Documents of Free Persons of Color is housed in the Smithsonian Libraries and Archives, affirming its value as a significant scholarly resource.

== Selected works ==
- Pieces of the Quilt: The Mosaic of an African American Family (2009)
- Notes and Documents of Free Persons of Color (2011, revised 2013)
- Black Minqua: The Life and Times of Henry Green (2012)
- A Nation of Flaws: Justus in the Homeland (2015)
- Along the Rappahannock: The Homeland of the Nanzatico (Nantaughtacund) Indian Nation (2017)
