= African Origins =

The African Origins project is a database run by researchers at Emory University, Georgia, United States, which aims to document all the known facts about the African diaspora, including all documentary material pertaining to the transatlantic slave trade. It is a sister project to Voyages: The Trans-Atlantic Slave Trade Database.
