= The Other Madisons (film) =

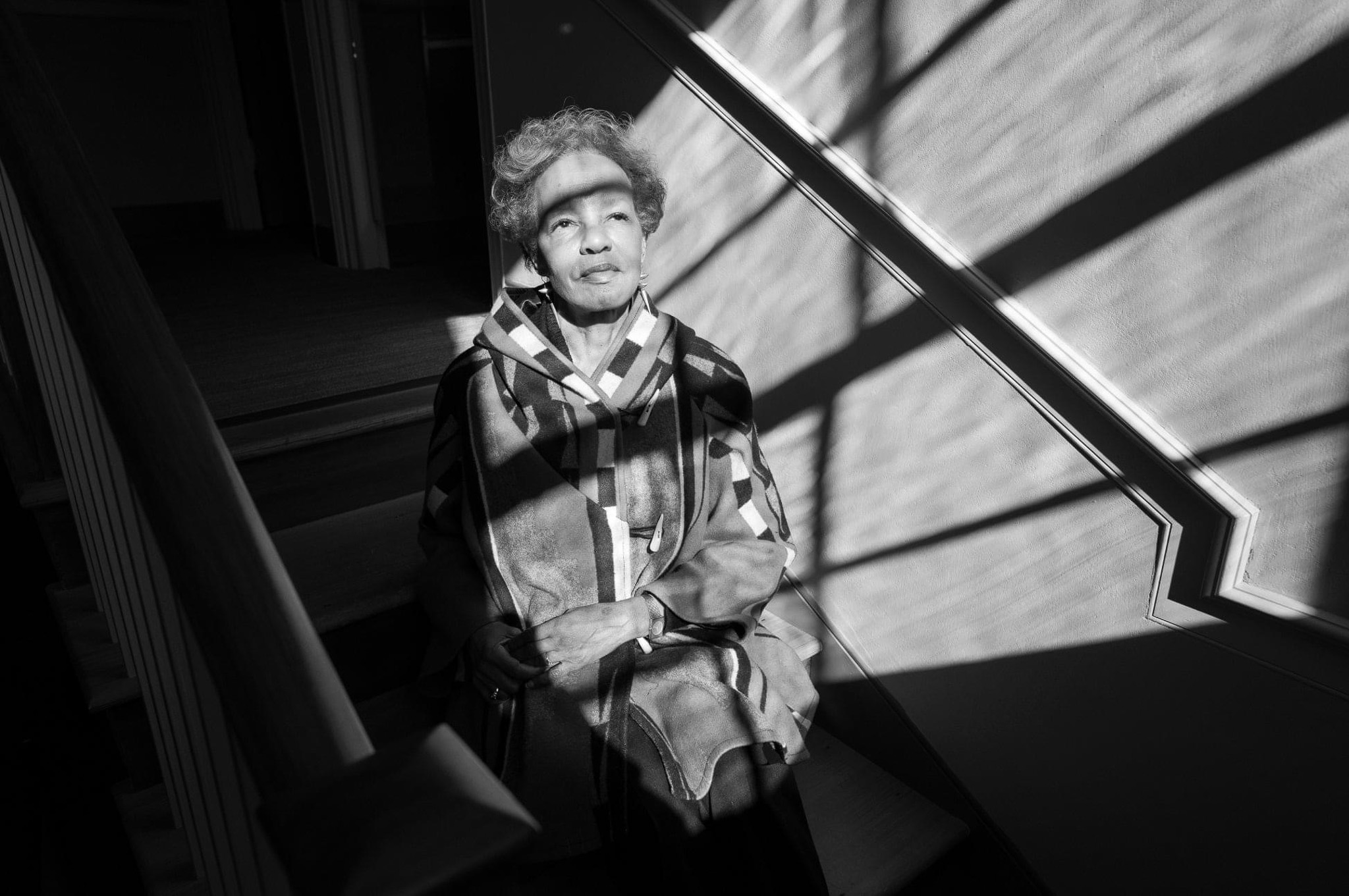
- Bettye Kearse
- Directed by: Eduardo Montes-Bradley
- Written by: Eduardo Montes-Bradley
- Based on: The Other Madisons: The Lost History of a President's Black Family by Bettye Kearse
- Produced by: Heritage Film Project
- Starring: Bettye Kearse, Rita Dove, Matthew B. Reeves, Christian Cotz, Lynn Rainville
- Cinematography: Eduardo Montes-Bradley
- Distributed by: Heritage Film Project
- Release date: 2021
- Running time: 30 minutes
- Country: United States
- Language: English

The Other Madisons is a 2021 American documentary film directed by Eduardo Montes-Bradley and produced by the Heritage Film Project. The film is based on the 2020 memoir The Other Madisons: The Lost History of a President's Black Family by Bettye Kearse. The documentary explores the oral tradition of a family of Black descendants of James Madison, the fourth President of the United States.

== Synopsis ==
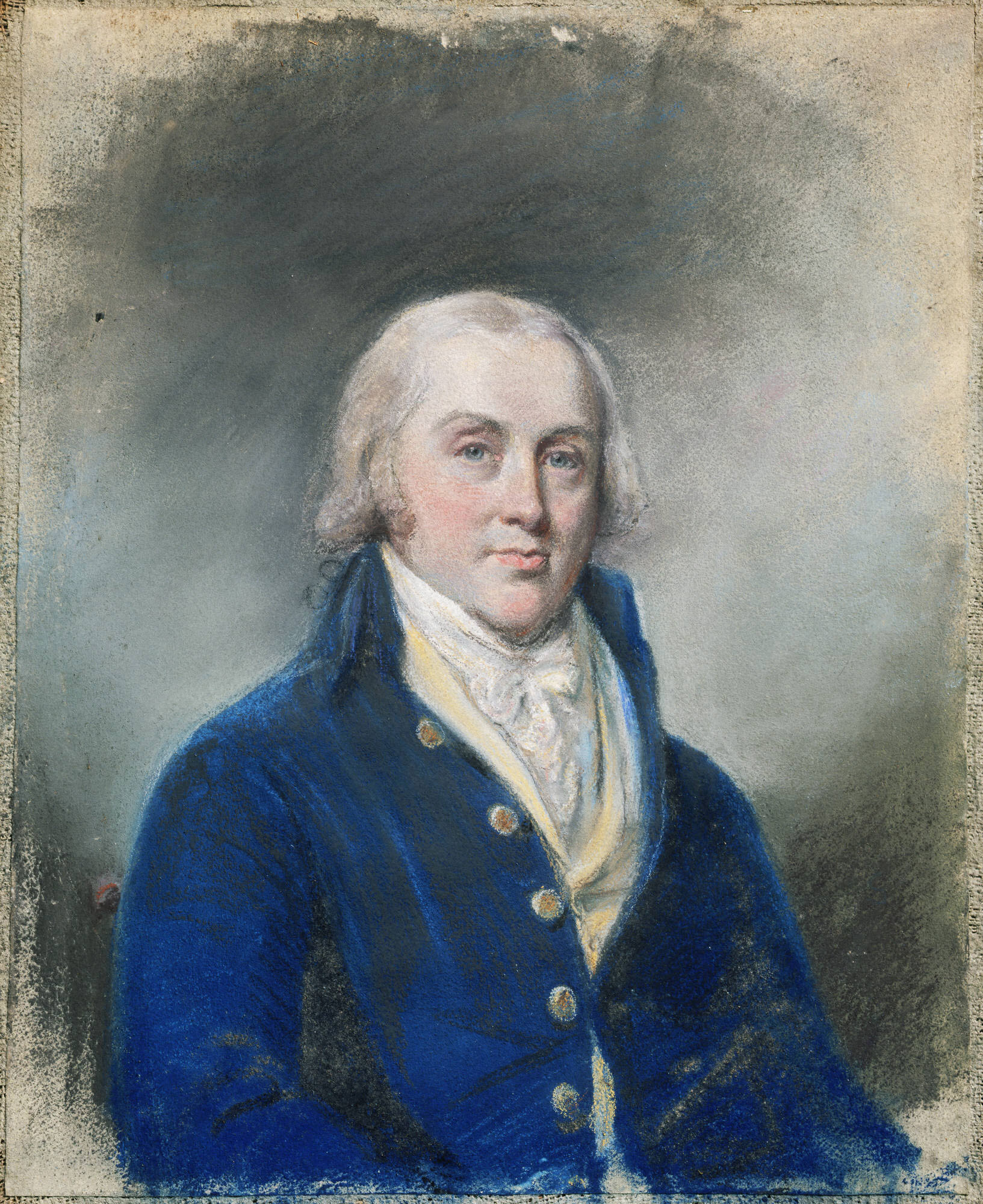
James Madison

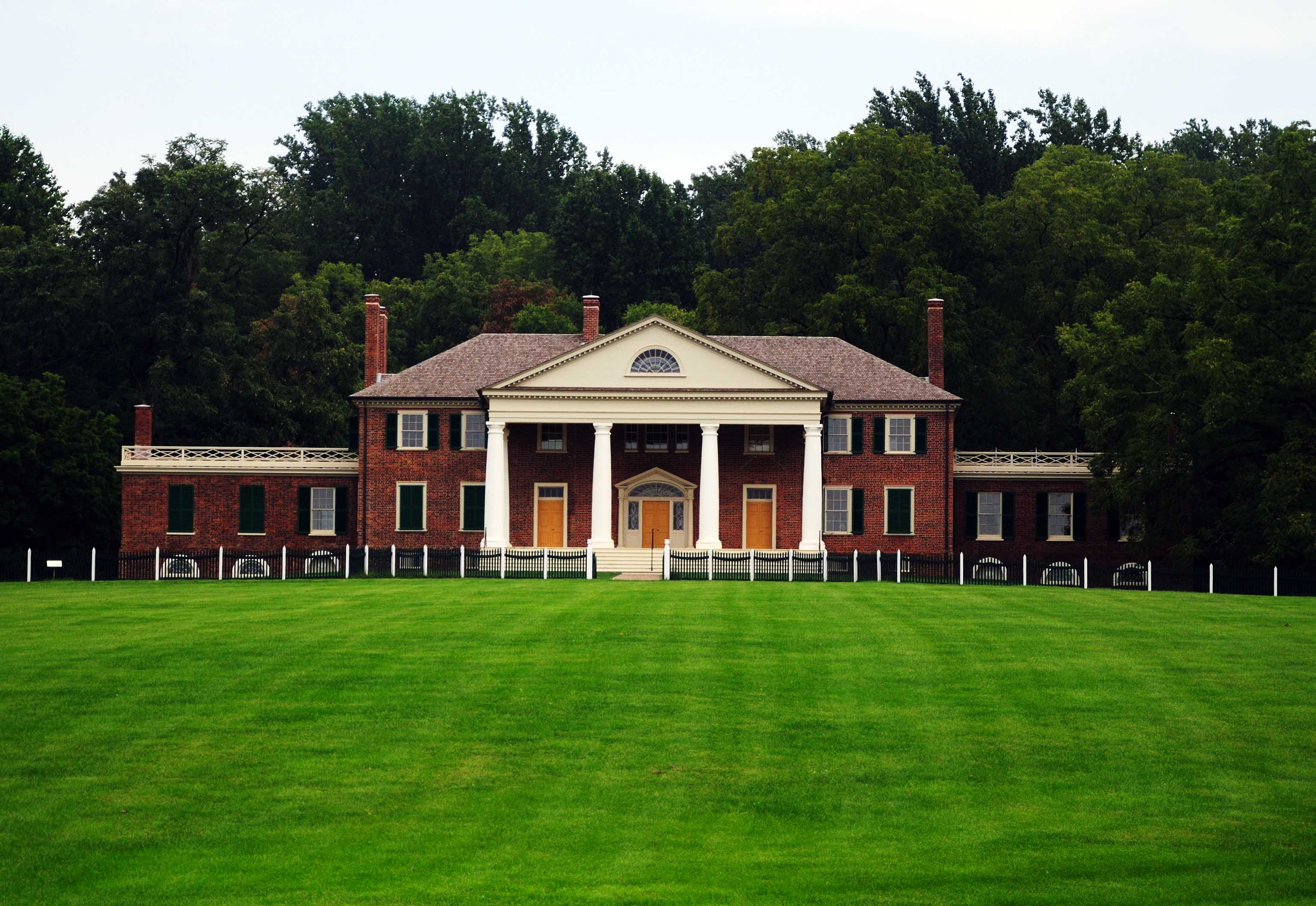
James Madison's Montpelier

The documentary examines the process by which an oral tradition preserves an important social record, both in spite of and in response to suppression and racism. The film follows Bettye Kearse, who traces her ancestry to Mandy, the family's first African ancestor enslaved on American soil and owned by President Madison's estate in Virginia, Montpelier. Kearse narrates the saga of her family — multiple generations of descendants of both enslaved people and James Madison — examining how historical memory survives systemic suppression.

== Production ==
The Other Madisons was directed by Eduardo Montes-Bradley and produced by Heritage Film Project. Montes-Bradley received the "Outstanding Public History Project Award" from the National Council on Public History for the project, presented in connection with the parallel exhibit "The Mere Distinction of Colour" produced by James Madison's Montpelier.

== Accuracy ==
See The Other Madisons Accuracy for more details

== Release and distribution ==
The Other Madisons was released through Kanopy and Alexander Street Press in 2021, and has been screened at multiple cultural institutions and film festivals.

== Festival appearances ==
The Other Madisons was selected for the following film festivals:

- Roxbury International Film Festival (2021)
- Mystic Film Festival (2022)
- DC Black Film Festival (2021)
- AfryKamera African Film Festival (2021)
- Martha's Vineyard African American Film Festival (2022)
- Black Truth Film Festival (2022) — Honorable Mention
- Atlanta Black Pride Film Festival (2022) — Honorable Mention

== Critical reception ==
The Other Madisons was covered by WVTF Radio, which highlighted the film's documentation of oral tradition within African American families. Black Enterprise covered the film's subject matter in the context of Kearse's broader research into her family's history.

=== Featured participants ===
- Bettye Kearse, protagonist and author, descendant of the Madison enslaved community
- Rita Dove, former United States Poet Laureate
- Matthew B. Reeves, archaeologist and historian at James Madison's Montpelier
- Christian Cotz, former CEO of the First Amendment Museum
- Lynn Rainville, former dean of Sweet Briar College and Director of Institutional History at Washington and Lee University

== Subject matter ==
The film is based on Bettye Kearse's memoir, which received the International Afro-American Historical and Genealogical Society Book Award for Nonfiction. Kearse's genealogical research was featured in The Washington Post.
