= Weaver family (Virginia) =

Family of East Indian origin from the colony of Virginia

Weaver
- Current region: United States, significant community in Indiana
- Origin: Colony of Virginia (Lancaster County)

The Weaver family is a free African-American family of East Indian origin from colonial Lancaster County, Virginia. In Indiana, they are also referred to as the Pettiford-Weaver family.

The Weaver family associated with other free Black families and formed free settlements in the states of North Carolina, South Carolina, Ohio, and Indiana. The family has been commemorated with a historical marker in Grant County, Indiana, and is studied using African-American genealogy.

== Historical background ==
The Weaver family originated from three East Indian men in Lancaster County, who were freed from their indentures in 1708. They were associated with the free Black Nickens family, who also originated in Lancaster County. Author Tim Hashaw dates their presence in Virginia back to the 1690s, and categorizes them a free Tidewater family of color, along with the Bunch, Mozingo, Gibson, Driggers, and Dial families.

=== Migration to the Carolinas ===
The Weaver family were taxed residents of Bertie County in North Carolina by 1751. Scholar Jean Bradley Anderson writes the Weaver surname begins appearing within historic Orange County by the 1800 census, and persists in the area. The family was present in Durham County after 1809. A branch of the family lived in Jamestown, North Carolina, nearby to High Point City Lake. Some later left to Indiana.

==== South Carolina ====
The Weaver family were among some of the first settlers of the South Carolinian backcountry in the years between 1790 and 1810. They and other free Black families were granted land in the counties of Marion, Marlboro, and Richland, where they formed settlements together.

=== Migration to Indiana ===
In the 1840s, some members of the Weaver family left the American South with the free Black Pettiford family to Indiana, due to hostility towards African-Americans. Weaver family migrants to Indiana originated from the counties of Orange and Guilford in North Carolina.

==== Weaver, Indiana ====
A branch of the family helped found the Black settlement Weaver, Indiana in Grant County with two other free African-American families. The community is alternatively described as being named after two different members of the family. One is Thomas Weaver, born within Guilford County in 1841. The other is John Henry Weaver, who operated a general store and post office in the settlement. Together with the other free families, the family had accumulated 1,000 acres of land by the American Civil War.

Due to the prevalence of the surname Weaver in the area, some escaped slaves took on the surname to avoid slave catchers. Local resident Thomas P. Weaver worked with the Underground Railroad and documented the settlement in an autobiography.

=== Migration to Ohio ===
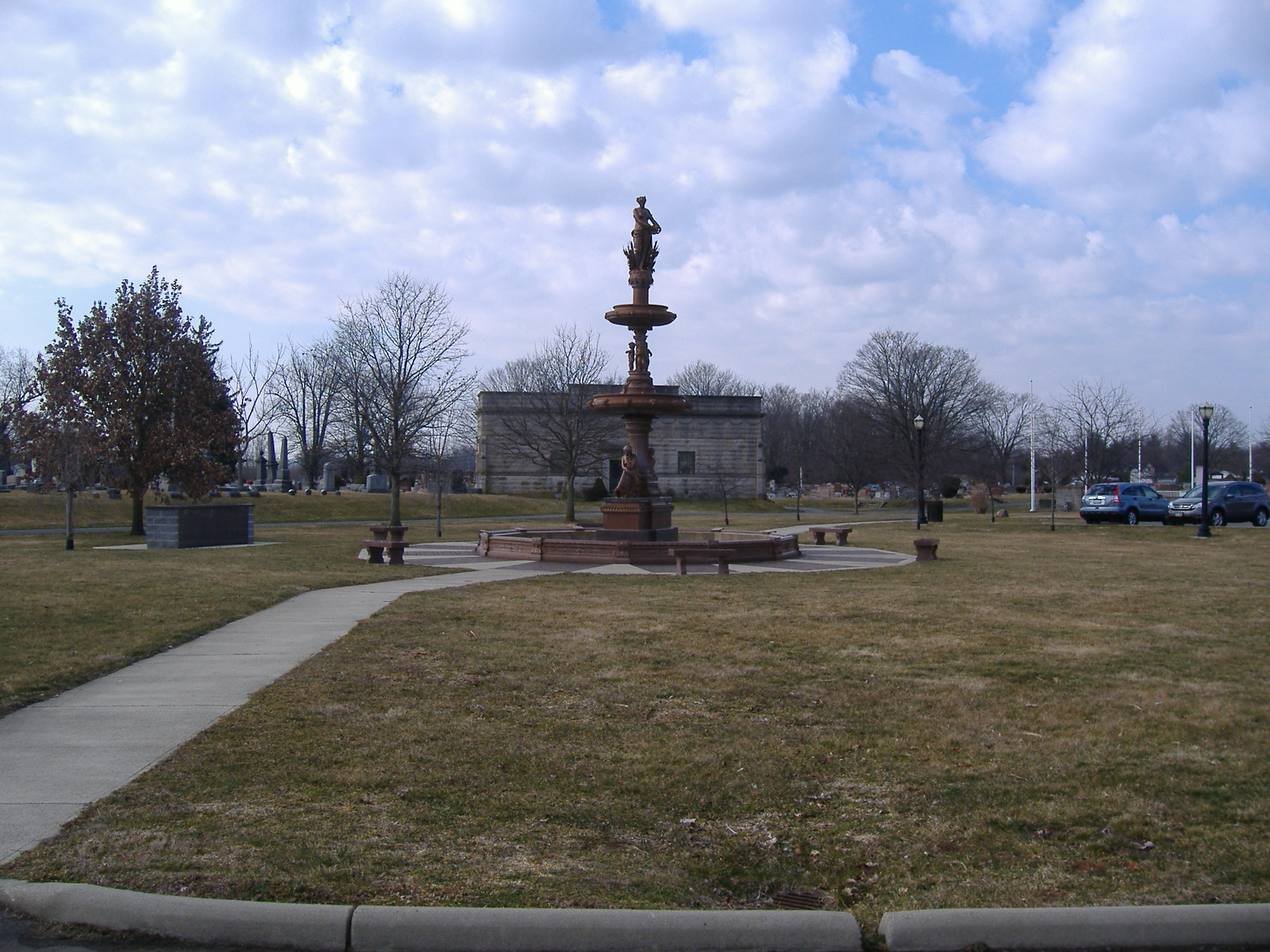
Some members of the Weaver family are buried at Washington Court House cemetery, Ohio.

A branch of the Weaver family migrated from Granville County in North Carolina to Washington Court House in Ohio between 1863 and 1870. They were accompanied by the free Black Anderson family. In 1890, the wealthiest African-American in Washington Court House was Silas Weaver, who had an African-American servant in his home. Author Jack S. Blocker writes this was unusual for an African-American family, and indicated their level of wealth. The family has an obelisk in the Washington Court Cemetery, where Blocker labels them the Scott/Weaver family.

==== Local activism ====
Silas served as a Republican political activist during the 1888 election campaign, and his wife Agnes led the founding of an African Methodist Episcopal church in 1867. Silas's nephew James also became a Republican activist, and helped found the local colored Republican club in 1891.

== Modern day ==
In Weaver, Indiana, the family is now known as the Pettiford-Weaver family. Members of the family hold a reunion annually every August. They have repurchased land in their historic area of settlement.

Retired professor Kersten Priest gave a presentation on the family during an event at the High Point Museum about descendants of free African-American families from Jamestown, North Carolina. Members of the Weaver and Pettiford families still reside in the area. Priest said the North Carolinian origin of emigrant free people of color was known to her partially due to maintenance of records by the Weaver family, through their genealogies and family reunions. She collaborated with Latanya Bowman, a member of the Historic Jamestown Society who did genetic and genealogical research on the family.

In 2020, The Indiana Historical Landmark Association placed a landmark for the Pettiford-Weaver family in Grant County. The same year, Taylor University held an event about the family and two others who founded Weaver, Indiana. A documentary about the Weaver and Pettiford families, Rooted In Love, Lifted in Strength, was produced about their history, and documents the repurchase of their family land.

== See also ==
- African-American genealogy
- African Americans in Virginia
- African Americans in North Carolina
- Armistead S. Nickens
- Ashworth family
- Bethel A.M.E. Church (Indianapolis, Indiana)
- Blackwell Family of Virginia
- Bunch family
- Chavis family
- Gibson family (Virginia)
- Healy family
- Hemings family
- Jordan Arterburn and Tarlton Arterburn
- People's history
- Quander family
- South Asians in Colonial America
- Syphax family

== Bibliography ==
- Heinegg, Paul (2021). Free African Americans of North Carolina, Virginia, and South Carolina from the Colonial Period to About 1820. Sixth Edition. Vol. I - Families Abel to Drew. Baltimore, MD: Genealogical Publishing Company. ISBN 9780806359298.
- Hashaw, Tim (2006). Children of Perdition. Melungeons and the Struggle of Mixed America. Macon, GA: Mercer University Press. ISBN 9780881460742.
- Anderson, Jean Bradley (2011). Durham County: A History of Durham County, North Carolina (2nd ed.). Durham, NC: Duke University Press. ISBN 978-0-8223-4983-9.
- Blocker, Jack S. (2008). Miller, Zane L. (ed.). A Little More Freedom: African Americans Enter the Urban Midwest, 1860-1930. Columbus, OH: The Ohio State University Press. ISBN 978-0-8142-1067-3.
