= Anthony Johnson (colonist) =

Indentured servant, farmer, enslaver (1600–1670)

- Born: Unknown c. 1600; Kingdom of Ndongo, Portuguese Angola
- Died: 1670 (aged 69–70); Colony of Virginia
- Other name: António or Antonio
- Occupations: Farmer, slaveowner
- Known for: Landowner in Colonial Virginia and Maryland who owned European indentured servants and was the first African American to own an African slave, John Casor, through a court proceeding over a dispute of fulfillment of his labor contract.

Signature
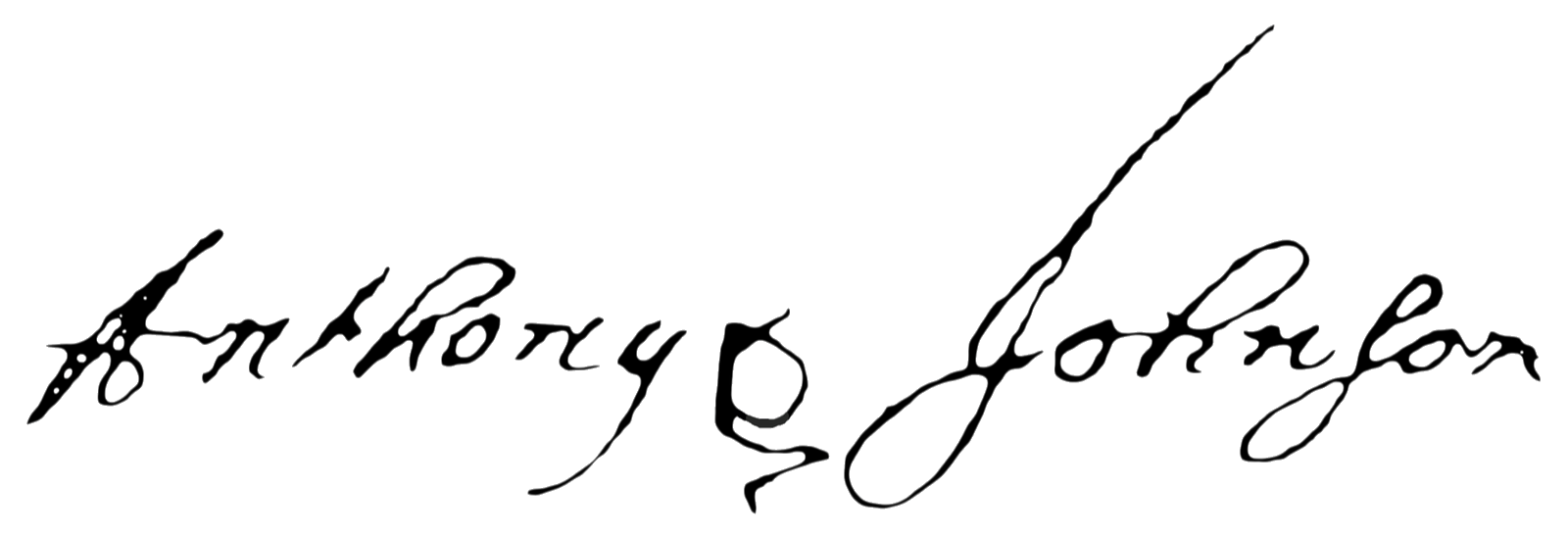

Anthony Johnson (b. c. 1600 – d. 1670) brought as an indentured servant from Angola and manumitted in the Colony of Virginia, became the first black man in America to own another black man in servitude for life, before moving to the Province of Maryland. He has been referred to as "'the black patriarch' of the first community of Negro property owners in America".

== Early life ==
In the early 1620s, African slave traders kidnapped the man who would later be known as Anthony Johnson in Portuguese Angola and sold him to Portuguese slavers, who named him António and sold him into the Atlantic slave trade. A colonist in Virginia acquired António. As an indentured servant, António worked for a merchant at the Virginia Company. He was also received into the Roman Catholic Church.

== Virginia ==
He sailed to Virginia in 1621 aboard the James. The Virginia Muster (census) of 1624 lists his name as "Antonio not given," recorded as "a Negro" in the "notes" column. Historians dispute whether this was the same António later known as Anthony Johnson, as the census lists several men named "Antonio". This one is considered the most likely.

Johnson was sold as an "indentured servant" to merchant Edward Bennett to work on his Virginia tobacco farm, Warrosquoake, on the southern bank of the James River. Slave laws were not passed until 1661 in Virginia; before that date, Africans were not officially considered to be enslaved.

Such workers typically worked under a limited indenture contract for four to seven years to pay off their passage, room, board, lodging, and freedom dues. In the early colonial years, most Africans in the Thirteen Colonies were held under such contracts of limited indentured servitude. Except for those indentured for life, they were released after a contracted period. Those who managed to survive their period of indenture would receive land and equipment after their contracts expired or were bought out. Most white laborers in this period also came to the colony as indentured servants.

António almost died in the Indian massacre of 1622 when Bennett's plantation was attacked. The Powhatan, who were the indigenous people dominant at that time in the Tidewater region of Virginia, were attempting to evict the colonists. They raided the settlement where Johnson worked on Good Friday and killed 52 of the 57 men present. He was manumitted by Nathaniel Littleton in 1635.

In 1623, a Black woman named Mary arrived aboard the ship Margaret. She was brought to work on the same plantation as António, where she was the only woman present. António and Mary married and lived together for more than forty years.

Sometime after 1635, António and Mary concluded the terms of their indentured servitude. António changed his name to Anthony Johnson. He first entered the legal record as an unindentured man when he purchased a calf in 1647.

The colonial government granted Johnson a large plot of farmland after he paid off his indentured contract by his labor. On July 24, 1651, he acquired 250 acres (100 ha) of land under the headright system by buying the contracts of five indentured servants, one of whom was his son, Richard Johnson. The headright system worked so that if a man were to bring indentured servants over to the colonies (in this particular case, Johnson brought the five servants), he was owed 50 acres a "head", or servant. The land was located on the Great Naswattock Creek, which flowed into the Pungoteague River in Northampton County, Virginia.

Johnson ran a tobacco farm using indentured servants. One of those servants, John Casor, would later become one of the first African men to be declared indentured for life.

In 1652, "an unfortunate fire" caused "great losses" for the family, and Johnson applied to the courts for tax relief. The court reduced the family's taxes and, on February 28, 1652, exempted his wife Mary and their two daughters from paying taxes "during their natural lives." At that time, taxes were levied on people, not property. Under the 1645 Virginia taxation act, "all negro men and women and all other men from the age of 16 to 60 shall be judged tithable." It is unclear from the records why the Johnson women were exempted, but the change gave them the same social standing as white women, who were not taxed. During the case, the justices noted that Anthony and Mary "have lived Inhabitants in Virginia (above thirty years)" and had been respected for their "hard labor and known service".

By the 1650s, Anthony and Mary Johnson were farming 250 acres in Northampton County, while their two sons owned 550 acres.

== Casor lawsuit ==
When Anthony Johnson was released from his servitude, he was legally recognized as a "free Negro." He became a successful farmer. In 1651, he owned 250 acres (100 ha) and the services of five indentured servants (four white and one black). In 1653, John Casor, a black indentured servant whose contract Johnson appeared to have bought in the early 1640s, approached Captain Samuel Goldsmith, claiming his indenture had expired seven years earlier and that he was being held illegally by Johnson. A neighbor, Robert Parker, intervened and persuaded Johnson to free Casor.

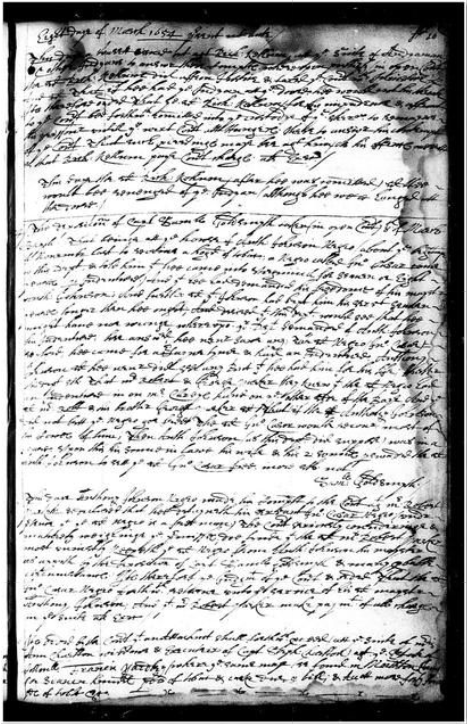
Handwritten court ruling. March 8, 1655

Parker offered Casor work, and he signed a term of indenture to the planter. Johnson filed a Freedom suit against Parker in the Northampton Court in 1654 for the return of Casor. The court initially found in favor of Parker, but Johnson appealed. In 1655, the court reversed its ruling. Finding that Anthony Johnson still "owned" John Casor, the court ordered that he be returned with the court dues paid by Robert Parker.

This was the first instance of a judicial determination in the Thirteen Colonies holding that a person who had committed no crime could be held in servitude for life.

Though Casor was the first person who was declared an enslaved person in a civil case, there were both black and white indentured servants sentenced to lifetime servitude before him. Many historians describe indentured servant John Punch as the first documented slave (or slave for life) in America as punishment for escaping his captors in 1640. It is considered one of the first legal cases to make a racial distinction between black and white indentured servants.

=== Significance of Casor lawsuit ===
The Casor lawsuit demonstrates the culture and mentality of planters in the mid-17th century. Individuals made assumptions about the society of Northampton County and their place in it. According to historians T.H. Brean and Stephen Innes, Casor believed he could form a stronger relationship with his patron, Robert Parker, than Anthony Johnson had developed over the years with his patrons. Casor considered the dispute to be a matter of patron-client relationship, and this wrongful assumption resulted in his losing his case in court and having the ruling against him. Johnson knew that the local justices shared his fundamental belief in the sanctity of property. The judge sided with Johnson, although in future legal issues, race played a more prominent role.

The Casor lawsuit was an example of how difficult it was for Africans who were indentured servants to prevent being reduced to slavery. Most Africans could not read and had almost no knowledge of the English language. Planters found it easy to force them into slavery by refusing to acknowledge the completion of their indentured contracts. This is what happened in Johnson v. Parker. Although two white planters confirmed that Casor had completed his indentured contract with Johnson, the court still ruled in Johnson's favor.

== Later life ==
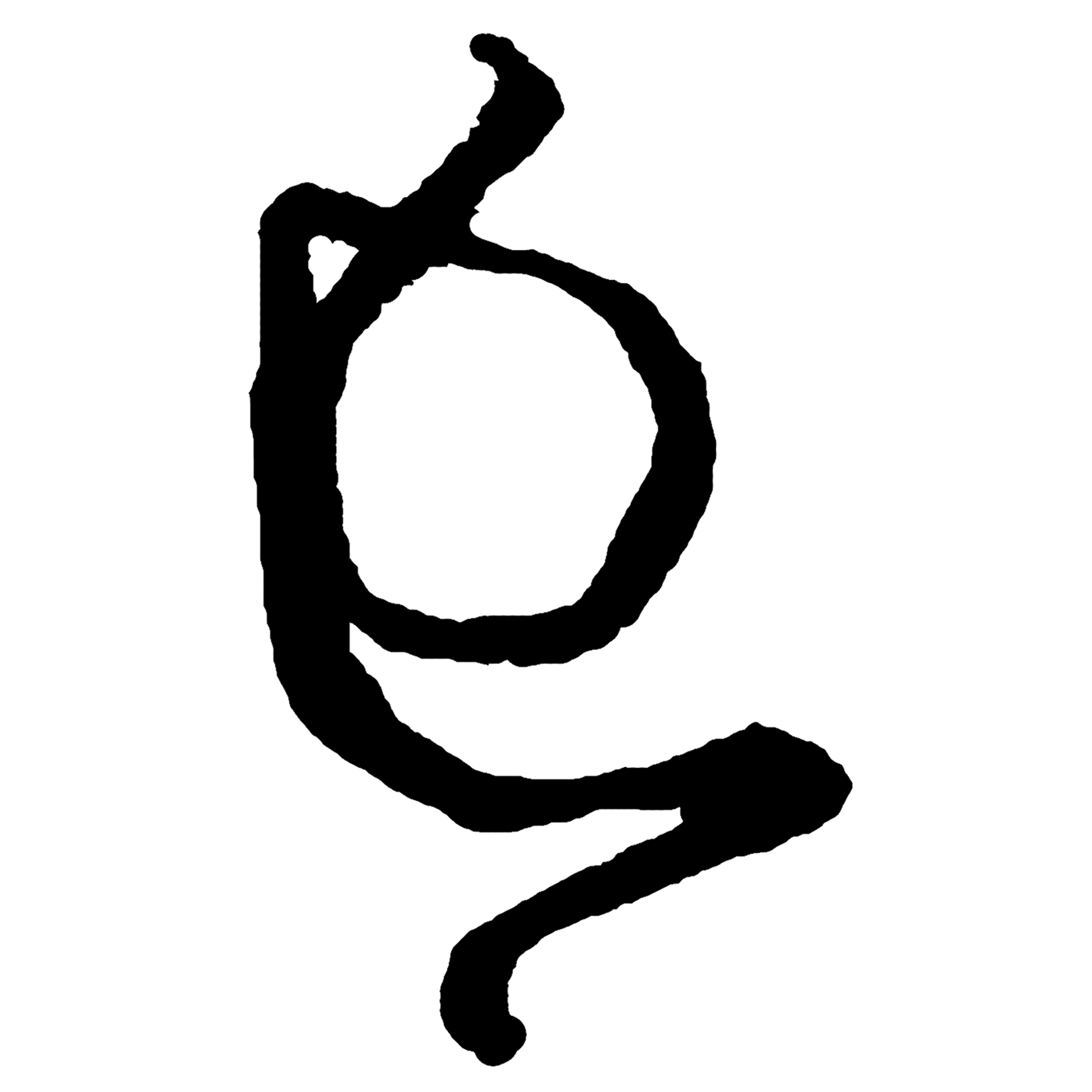
1666 Marke of Anthony Johnson

In 1657, Johnson's neighbor, Edmund Scarborough, allegedly forged a letter in which Johnson acknowledged a debt; whether this debt was real or not is unknown. Johnson did not contest the case. Johnson was illiterate and could not have written the letter; nevertheless, the court awarded Scarborough 100 acres (40 ha) of Johnson's land to pay off his alleged "debt".

In this early period, free blacks enjoyed "relative equality" with the white community. About 20% of free black Virginians owned their own homes. In 1662, the Virginia Colony passed a law that children in the colony were born with the social status of their mother, according to the Roman principle of partus sequitur ventrem. This meant that the children of slave women were born into slavery, even if their fathers were free, European, Christian, and white. This was a reversal of English common law, which held that the children of English subjects took the status of their father. The Virginian colonial government expressed the opinion that since Africans were not Christians, common law could not and did not apply to them.

Anthony Johnson moved his family to Somerset County, Maryland in 1665, where he negotiated a lease on a 300-acre (120 ha) plot of land for ninety-nine years. He developed the property as a tobacco farm, which he named Tories Vineyard. Mary survived, and in 1672, she bequeathed a cow to each of her grandsons.

Research indicates that when Johnson died in 1670, his plantation was given to a white colonist, not to Johnson's children. A judge had ruled that he was "not a citizen of the colony" because he was black.

=== Descendants ===
In 1677, Anthony and Mary's grandson, John Jr., purchased a 44-acre (18-hectare) farm, which he named Angola. John Jr. died without leaving an heir, however. By 1730, the Johnson family had vanished from historical significance. Genealogical research suggests that some of Anthony's other descendants moved to Delaware and then to North Carolina.

== See also ==
- African-American history

== Sources ==
- Berlin, Ira. Many Thousands Gone, The First Two Centuries of Slavery in North America, Harvard University Press, 1998.
- Breen, Timothy and Stephen Innes. "Myne Own Ground" Race and Freedom on Virginia's Eastern Shore, 1979/reprint 2004, 25th-anniversary edition: Oxford University Press
- Cox, Ryan Charles. Delmarva Settlers Settlers and Sites - "The Johnson Family: The Migratory Study of an African-American Family on the Eastern Shore", Delmarva Settlers], University of Maryland Salisbury, accessed 16 November 2012.
- Horton, James Oliver and Lois E. Horton, Hard Road to Freedom: The Story of African America, Rutgers University Press, 2002.
- Johnson, Charles; Patricia Smith, and the WGBH Research Team, Africans in America: America's Journey Through Slavery, Houghton Mifflin Harcourt, 1999.
- Klein, Herbert S. Slavery in the Americas; A Comparative Study of Virginia and Cuba.
- Nash, Gary B., Julie R. Jeffrey, John R. Howe, Peter J. Frederick, Allen F. Davis, and Allan M. Winkler. The American People: Creating a Nation and a Society. 6th ed. New York: Pearson, 2004. 74–75.
- Matthews, Harry Bradshaw, The Family Legacy of Anthony Johnson: From Jamestown, VA to Somerset, MD, 1619–1995, Oneonta, NY: Sondhi Loimthongkul Center for Interdependence, Hartwick College, 1995.
- Russell, Jack Henderson. The Free Negro in Virginia, 1619–1865, Baltimore: Johns Hopkins University Press, 1913
- WPA Writers' Program, Virginia, Guide to The Old Dominion, Oxford University Press, NY, 1940 (p. 378)
- "Anthony Johnson", Thinkport Library
