= John Casor =

American indentured servant and slave

- Died: Colony of Virginia
- Occupation: Slave
- Years active: 1654 until his death
- Known for: First official slave in the Thirteen Colonies under civil law

John Casor (surname also recorded as Cazara and Corsala), an indentured servant and later slave in Northampton County in the Colony of Virginia, in 1655 became one of the first people of African descent in the Thirteen Colonies to be enslaved for life as a result of a civil suit.

In 1662, the Virginia Colony passed a law incorporating the principle of partus sequitur ventrem, ruling that children of enslaved mothers would be born into slavery, regardless of their father's race or status. This contradicted English common law for English subjects, which based a child's status on that of the father. In 1699, the Virginia House of Burgesses passed a law deporting all free Black people. But many new families of free Black people continued to be formed during the colonial years by the close relationships among the working class.

== Background ==
At this time, there were only about 300 people of African origin living in the Virginia Colony, about 1% of an estimated population of 30,000. The first group of 20 or so Africans were brought to Jamestown in 1619 as freed captives.

Although most historians believe slavery, as an institution, developed much later, they differ on the exact status of the servitude of Africans before slavery was established legally, as well as differing over the date when this took place. The colonial charter entitled English subjects and their children the rights of the common law. Still, people of other nations were considered foreigners or aliens outside the common law. At the time, the colony had no provision for naturalizing foreigners.

== Legal dispute ==
Anthony Johnson, a Black Angolan, was an indentured servant brought to the James River area of Virginia on the ship James in 1621. During the late 1640s, Johnson moved with his family to Northampton County on the Eastern Shore of Virginia. He acquired property on Pungoteague Creek and began raising livestock. He was the first known African landowner in the colony. By July 1651, he had expanded his holdings, which he referred to in a court record as myne owne ground, to 250 acres (100 ha), then a considerable tract by Eastern Shore standards. He was prosperous enough to import five indentured servants of his own and was granted an additional 250 acres (100 ha) as "headrights" for bringing in workers.

In 1653, John Casor, an African man employed by Johnson, filed what later became known as a freedom suit. He said that he had been imported with an indenture of "seaven or eight yeares", and that Johnson told him he did not have one after he attempted to reclaim it. According to the civil court documents, Casor demanded his freedom. "Anthony Johnson was in a feare. Upon this his son in law, his wife and his two sonnes persuaded the said Anthony Johnson to set the said John Casor free."

Casor went to work for Robert Parker, an English colonist who, along with his brother George, later testified that they knew Casor had an indenture. One commentator said that Johnson may have feared losing his headrights land if the case went to court.

In 1654, Johnson sued Robert Parker in Northampton County court for detaining his "Negro servant, John Casor," saying, "Hee never did see any [indenture] but that hee had ye Negro for his life". In the case of Johnson v. Parker, the court of Northampton County upheld Johnson's right to enslave Casor, saying in its ruling of March 8, 1655:

This daye Anthony Johnson negro made his complaint to the court against mr. Robert Parker and declared that hee deteyneth his servant John Casor negro under the pretence that said negro was a free man. The court seriously consideringe and maturely weighing the premisses, doe fynde that the saide Mr. Robert Parker most unjustly keepeth the said Negro from Anthony Johnson his master ... It is therefore the Judgement of the Court and ordered That the said John Casor Negro forthwith returne unto the service of the said master Anthony Johnson, And that Mr. Robert Parker make payment of all charges in the suit.

== Slavery ==
In sustaining the claim of Johnson to the perpetual service of Casor, the court also gave judicial sanction to the right of free Black people to enslave another Black person. In a 1916 article, John H. Russell wrote, "Indeed no earlier record, to our knowledge, has been found of judicial support given to slavery in Virginia except as a punishment for a crime." Russell makes that distinction because in 1640, John Punch "was reduced from his former condition of servitude for a limited time to a condition of slavery for life." In 1670, the colonial assembly passed a law prohibiting free and baptized Black and Indigenous people from purchasing White, Christian persons, but allowing them to buy people "of their owne nation." In this meaning, "purchase" is also related to buying the contract services of indentured servants of various "nations."

In 1665, Anthony Johnson and his wife, Mary; his son John; and his wife, Susanna; and John Casor moved to Somerset County, Maryland. Casor remained enslaved by Johnson for the rest of his life.

Legal restrictions related to African servants continued to be made. The courts reasoned that "Insofar as Negroes were heathens, they could never become Englishmen; insofar as they were not Englishmen, they could not be entitled to the protections of the common law," which was limited to English subjects. Africans were considered foreigners or aliens.

In 1662, the colony passed a law that children of enslaved women (of African descent and thus foreigners) were to take the mother's status rather than the father's, as was current under English common law. The principle, called partus sequitur ventrum, had been adopted from Roman law and caused children born of a free White mother and Black father to be born free. In 1691, the law was amended; such mixed-race children had to serve as indentured servants for 30 years while the mother would be fined fifteen pounds sterling. If the mother failed to pay the fine within a month of birth, she was indentured herself for five years.

By the end of the 17th century, colonists were importing many African slaves via European slave traders to satisfy their demands for labor. There was limited demand for slaves, and trade with America was unprofitable, with the trade with the West Indies and South America remaining far more lucrative. The most likely source of slaves was directly from the West Indies, rather than Africa, through the contacts the American colonists maintained with the European colonies in the region. By an act of 1699, the colony ordered all free Black people deported, virtually defining slaves as all people of African descent who remained in the colony.

Most historians argue that John Punch, an African who was ordered indentured for life in 1640, should be considered the first documented slave in Virginia. Punch had escaped along with two White indentured servants, one from the United Provinces and the other from Scotland. When they were captured, all three were sentenced to whippings. The Dutchman and the Scotsman were sentenced to an additional four years of servitude. However, John Punch, the African, was sentenced to servitude for the rest of his life. The difference in penalties makes this one of the first cases to show a racial distinction between Black and White indentured servants.

== See also ==
- Indentured servitude in Virginia
- John Punch
- Freedom suit
- List of slaves
