= Slavery in the colonial history of the United States =

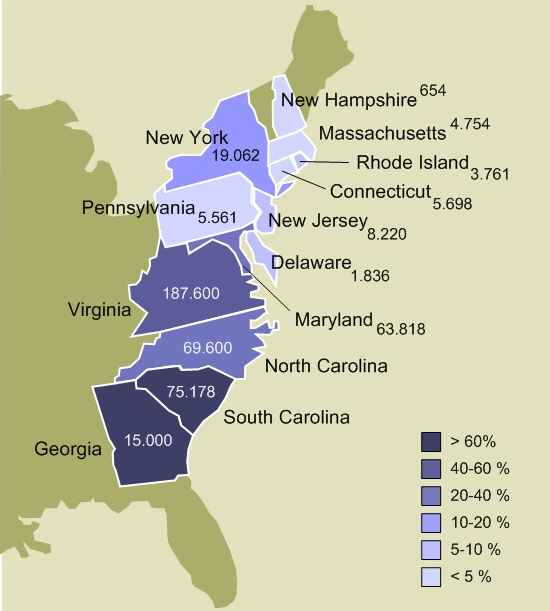
A map of the Thirteen Colonies in 1770, showing number of slaves in each colony and percentage of colony's total population held as slaves

The institution of slavery in the colonies of British America developed through a combination of factors, but primarily from a boom in industrialized agriculture and the early existence of large slave labor populations on nearby European-colonized Caribbean islands. Before the 1650s, however, African-based industrial slavery had not developed within the colonies. During this time, Native Americans were the main target for servitude by British American colonists.

By the 1650s, several Southern colonies were known to have begun enslaving both local Native Americans and African Americans for work on industrial plantations. As indigenous peoples suffered massive population losses due to imported diseases, Europeans turned to the importation of African slaves, initially, from European-owned West Indies (Caribbean) sugar plantations, primarily to work on tobacco, rice or indigo plantations.

Ancient methods of European slavery and racist ideologies were handed down to the British American colonies shortly after agriculture became industrialized in the South. Most African American colonists eventually succumbed to slavery and were legally defined by hereditary traits as chattels of property.

There was a period of about 50 years during which industrialized slavery was mostly absent from the colonies. The 1587 Roanoke Colony attempt by around 112 English colonists on a Virginia island was found abandoned in 1590. Jamestown was the second English colony, founded in 1606 by around 214 colonists. The first documented Africans to arrive in English America first lived in Jamestown and were captured from a slave ship and transported on the frigate known as the White Lion in August 1619. The Virginia colonists traded provisions to obtain the Africans. The two early colonists are described in the 1624 census as an African man and woman named Antoney and Isabella.

Most early European colonists were indentured laborers who signed away their freedom to an English investment company known as the Virginia Company. Many were escaping famine and debt in Europe and paid their way to the "New World" by entering into contracted servitude for a paid ticket to America. Known as the Headright System, new colonists were promised 50 acres (0.20 km2) in return for years of indentured labor. Most early colonists were not of the same economic class as European slave owners and did not own slaves during their indenture. Years after living as colonists, few were able to fully pay their debt and, as a result, never received their promised plot of land. The main barrier was a lack of resources in the colonies and corruption within the Virginia Company. Early colonists were unsuccessful in finding the anticipated gold and proper soil to grow European crops. To cover its losses, originally agreed-upon periods of indentured servitude were often fraudulently extended by the Virginia Company for years without justification. Over half the population of Jamestown perished from starvation in 1618, still in debt to the Virginia Company. The one crop appearing to be most successful for colonists was tobacco. In 1614, John Rolfe began to raise the tobacco seeds he carried from Bermuda to Jamestown. Over the next decade, tobacco became the colonies' first cash crop and likely opened the door to African American slavery within some colonies in later decades, mainly in regions where tobacco grew successfully.

In 1624, the charter of the Virginia Company was revoked and the British Crown took over direct administration of the colony. Estimates suggest there were under 100 African Americans in the colony, or less than 2 percent of the population, through the 1650s. Up until then, early laborers of African descent were brought to the colonies, out of the Atlantic slave trade, and as there were yet no local slavery laws, placed mainly under the Headright System working alongside their white counterparts as indentured laborers. However, African Americans unlike others in the colony were not considered subjects of the Crown but foreigners and suffered a higher level of mis-treatment than whites and only a handful escaped systematic corruption to briefly experience freedom and a precarious legal system, especially as chattel slavery for Africans was established under the Crown and grew in importance in the colony. There are accounts of few African American colonists, freed under the Headright System, who later owned African American slaves and as chattel slavery grew in the 17th century even these few accounts cease.

By the Revolutionary War, most Southern colonies had developed large slave-based plantation systems, largely based on British-taught methods of slavery. Prohibitions on the importation of new slaves from the Caribbean and Africa, between 1776 to 1808, had little effect on American slavery, as it was already well established in the South. Slavery in the Northern colonies—which did not have the warm climates and ideal conditions for plantations to exist—primarily took the form of domestic labor, including other forms of unpaid work alongside non-enslaved counterparts. The American Revolution led to the first abolition laws in the Americas, although the institution of chattel slavery would continue to exist and expand across the Southern United States until finally being abolished at the time of the American Civil War in 1865.

== Native Americans ==
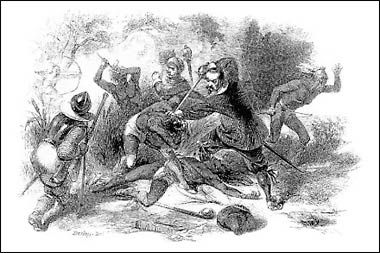
The Pequot War resulted in the enslavement of numerous Pequots by New England colonists and their indigenous allies.

A 1711 petition made by Sarah Robins, a "free born Indian woman", to colonial New York governor Robert Hunter, protesting being threatened with enslavement for refusing to convert to Christianity

Native Americans enslaved members of their own and other tribes, usually as a result of taking captives in raids and warfare, both before and after Europeans arrived. This practice continued into the 1800s. In some cases, especially for young women or children, Native American families adopted captives to replace members they had lost. Among those native to the modern Southeastern United States, the children of slaves were considered free. Slaves included captives from wars and slave raids; captives bartered from other tribes, sometimes at great distances; children sold by their parents during famines; and men and women who staked themselves in gambling when they had nothing else, which put them into servitude in some life cases.

In three expeditions between 1514 and 1525, Spanish explorers visited the Carolinas. They enslaved Native Americans, who they took to their base on Santo Domingo. The Spanish Crown's charter for its 1526 colony in the Carolinas and Georgia was more restrictive. It required that Native Americans be treated well, paid, and converted to Christianity, but it also allowed already enslaved Native Americans to be bought and exported to the Caribbean if they had been enslaved by other Native Americans. This colony did not survive, so it is not clear if it exported any slaves. Native Americans were enslaved by the Spanish in Florida under the encomienda system. New England and the Carolinas captured Native Americans in wars and distributed them as slaves. Native Americans captured and enslaved some early European explorers and colonists.

Larger societies structured as chiefdoms kept slaves as unpaid field laborers. In band societies, owning enslaved captives attested to the captor's military prowess. Some war captives were subjected to ritualized torture and execution. Alan Gallay and other historians emphasize differences between Native American enslavement of war captives and the European slave trading system, into which numerous native peoples were integrated. Richard White, in The Middle Ground, elucidates the complex social relationships between Native American groups and the early empires, including 'slave' culture and scalping. Robbie Ethridge states,

Let there be no doubt...that the commercial trade in Indian slaves was not a continuation and adaptation of pre-existing captivity patterns. It was a new kind of slave, requiring a new kind of occupational specialty ... organized militaristic slavers.

One example of militaristic slaving can be seen in Nathaniel Bacon's actions in Virginia during the late 1670s. In June 1676, the Virginia assembly granted Bacon and his men what equated to a slave-hunting license by providing that any enemy Native Americans caught were to be slaves for life. They also provided soldiers who had captured Native Americans with the right to "reteyne and keepe all such Indian slaves or other Indian goods as they either have taken or hereafter shall take." By this order, the assembly had made a public decision to enslave Native Americans. In the years to follow, other laws resulted in Native Americans being grouped with other non-Christian servants who had been imported to the colonies (Negro slaves) as slaves for life.

Puritan New England, Virginia, Spanish Florida, and the Carolina colonies engaged in large-scale enslavement of Native Americans, often through the use of Indian proxies to wage war and acquire the slaves. In New England, slave raiding accompanied the Pequot War and King Philip's War but declined after the latter war ended in 1676. Enslaved Native Americans were in Jamestown from the early years of the settlement, but large-scale cooperation between slave-trading English colonists and the Westo and Occaneechi peoples, whom they armed with guns, did not begin until the 1640s. These groups conducted enslaving raids in what is now Georgia, Tennessee, North Carolina, South Carolina, Florida, and possibly Alabama. The Carolina slave trade, which included both trading and direct raids by colonists, was the largest among the British colonies in North America, estimated at 24,000 to 51,000 Native Americans by Gallay.

Historian Ulrich Phillips argues that Africans were inculcated as slaves and the best answer to the labor shortage in the New World because Native American slaves were more familiar with the environment, and would often successfully escape into the frontier territory they knew. Africans had more difficulty surviving in unknown territory. Africans were also more familiar with large-scale indigo and rice cultivation, of which Native Americans were unfamiliar.. Early colonial America depended heavily on rice and indigo cultivation, which produced disease-carrying mosquitoes that caused malaria—a disease to which Africans were far less susceptible to than Native American slaves.

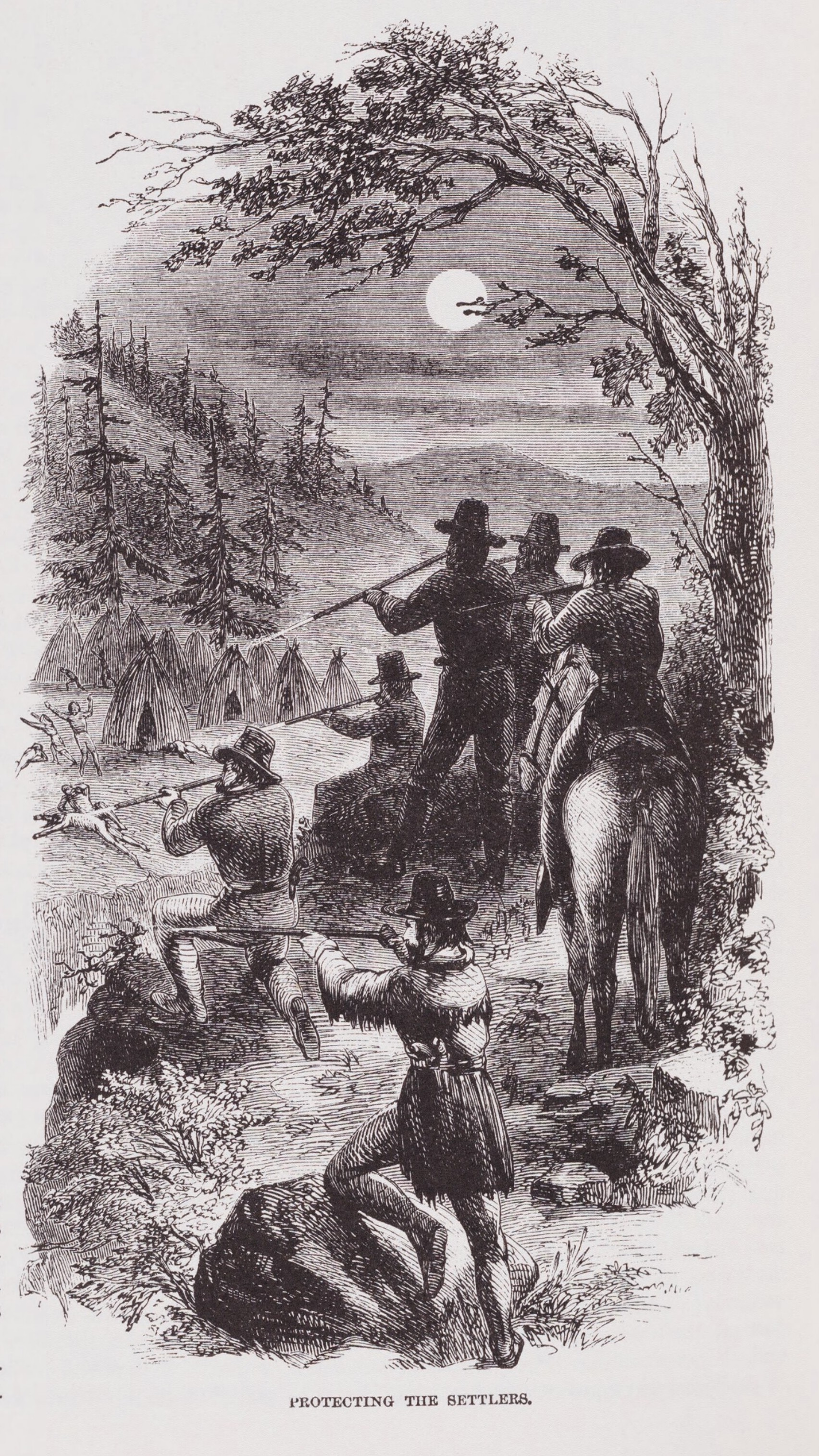
Many Native Americans were enslaved during the California Genocide by American settlers.

During the 17th and 18th centuries, Native American slavery, the enslavement of Native Americans by European colonists, was common. Many of these Native slaves were exported to the Northern colonies and to off-shore colonies, especially the "sugar islands" of the Caribbean. The exact number of Native Americans who were enslaved is unknown because vital statistics and census reports were at best infrequent. Historian Alan Gallay has estimated that from 1670 to 1715, slave traders in the Province of Carolina sold between 24,000 and 51,000 Native Americans into slavery as part of the Indian slave trade in the American Southeast. Andrés Reséndez estimates that between 147,000 and 340,000 Native Americans were enslaved in North America, excluding Mexico. Even after the Indian Slave Trade ended in 1750 the enslavement of Native Americans continued in the west, and also in the Southern states mostly through kidnappings.

Slavery of Native Americans was organized in colonial and Mexican California through Franciscan missions, theoretically entitled to ten years of Native labor, but in practice maintaining them in perpetual servitude, until their charge was revoked in the mid-1830s. Following the 1847–48 invasion by U.S. troops, the "loitering or orphaned Indians" were de facto enslaved in the new state from statehood in 1850 to 1867. Slavery required the posting of a bond by the slave holder and enslavement occurred through raids and a four-month servitude imposed as a punishment for Indian "vagrancy".

== The first enslaved Africans ==
=== Carolinas ===
The first African slaves in what would become the present-day United States of America arrived in Puerto Rico in the early 16th century, at the hands of the Portuguese. The island's native population was conquered by the Spanish settler Juan Ponce de León with the help of a free West African conquistador, Juan Garrido, by 1511. The slave population on the island grew after the Spanish crown granted import rights to its citizens, but did not reach its peak until the 18th century. African slaves arrived on August 9, 1526, in Winyah Bay (off the coast of present-day South Carolina) with a Spanish expedition. Lucas Vázquez de Ayllón brought 600 colonists to start a colony at San Miguel de Gualdape. Records say the colonists included enslaved Africans, without saying how many. After a month, Ayllón moved the colony to what is now Georgia.

Until the early 18th century, enslaved Africans were difficult to acquire in the British mainland colonies. Most were sold from Africa to the West Indies for the labor-intensive sugar trade. The large plantations and high mortality rates required continued importation of slaves. One of the first major centers of African slavery in the English North American colonies occurred with the founding of Charles Town and the Province of Carolina (later, South Carolina) in 1670. The colony was founded mainly by British sugar planters from colonial Barbados, who brought relatively large numbers of African slaves from that island to develop new plantations for sugar, tobacco, rice or indigo in the Carolinas.

To meet agricultural labor needs, colonists also practiced Indian slavery for some time. The Carolinians transformed the Indian slave trade during the late 17th and early 18th centuries by treating such slaves as a trade commodity to be exported, mainly to the West Indies. Historian Alan Gallay estimates that between 1670 and 1715, an estimated 24,000 to 51,000 captive Native Americans were exported from South Carolina to the Caribbean. This was a much higher number than the number of Africans imported to the English mainland colonies during the same period.

In 1733, royal governor George Burrington complained that no ships brought their slave cargoes from Africa directly to the Province of North Carolina.

=== Georgia ===
The first African slaves in what is now Georgia arrived in mid-September 1526 with Lucas Vázquez de Ayllón's establishment of San Miguel de Gualdape for the Spanish Crown. They rebelled and lived with indigenous people, destroying the Spanish colony in less than two months.

Two centuries later, the Province of Georgia was the last of Britain's Thirteen Colonies to be established and the farthest south. (Florida, a possession of Spain, lay just to its south). Founded in 1733, British Georgia and its powerful backers did not necessarily object to slavery as an institution, but their business model relied first on labor from Britain (primarily England's poor). The British were also concerned with security, given the closeness of Spanish Florida and Spain's regular offers to enemy-slaves to revolt or escape. Despite support for slavery, it was not until the defeat of the Spanish by Georgia's British colonials in the 1740s (Battle of Bloody Marsh) that arguments for opening the colony to slavery intensified. To staff Georgia's new rice plantations and settlements, the colony's proprietors relented in 1751, and African slavery grew quickly. After becoming a British royal colony in the 1760s, Georgia began importing slaves directly from Africa.

=== Florida ===
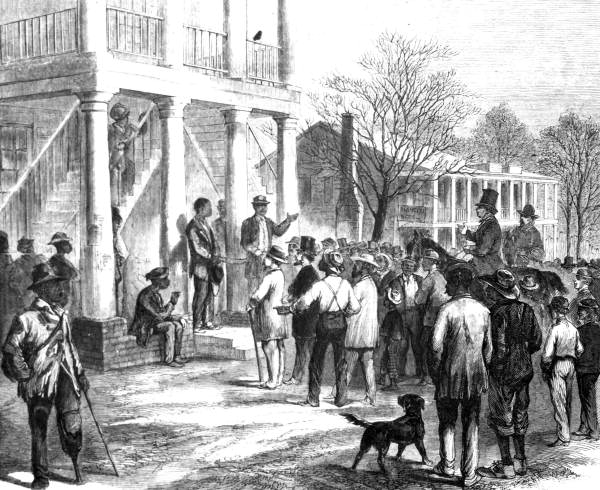
Selling a freedman to pay his fine: Monticello, Florida (1860)

One African slave, Estevanico arrived with the Narváez expedition in Tampa Bay in April 1528 and marched north with the expedition until September, when they embarked on rafts from the Wakulla River, heading for Mexico. African slaves arrived again in Florida in 1539 with Hernando de Soto, and in the 1565 founding of St. Augustine, Florida. When St. Augustine was founded in 1565, the site already had enslaved Native Americans, whose ancestors had migrated from Cuba. The Spanish settlement was sparse and they held comparatively few slaves.

The Spanish promised freedom to refugee slaves from the English colonies of South Carolina and Georgia in order to destabilize English settlement. If the slaves converted to Catholicism and agreed to serve in a militia for Spain, they could become Spanish citizens. By 1730 the black settlement known as Fort Mose developed near St. Augustine and was later fortified. There were two known Fort Mose sites in the eighteenth century, and the men helped defend St. Augustine against the British. It is "the only known free black town in the present-day southern United States that a European colonial government-sponsored. The Fort Mose Site, today a National Historic Landmark, is the location of the second Fort Mose." During the nineteenth century, this site became marsh and wetlands.

In 1763, Great Britain took over Florida in an exchange with Spain after defeating France in the Seven Years' War. Spain evacuated its citizens from St. Augustine, including the residents of Fort Mose, transporting them to Cuba. As British colonists developed the colony for plantation agriculture, the percentage of slaves in the population in twenty years rose from 18% to almost 65% by 1783.

=== Texas and the southwest ===
An African slave, Estevanico, reached Galveston Island in November 1528, with the remnants of the Narváez expedition in Florida. The group headed south on the mainland in 1529, trying to reach Spanish settlements. They were captured and held by Native Americans until 1535. They traveled northwest to the Pacific Coast, then south along the coast to San Miguel de Culiacán, which had been founded in 1531, and then to Mexico City.

Spanish Texas had few African slaves, but the colonists enslaved many Native Americans. Beginning in 1803, Spain freed slaves who escaped from the Louisiana territory, recently acquired by the United States. More African-descended slaves were brought to Texas by American settlers.

=== Virginia and Chesapeake Bay ===
The first recorded Africans in Virginia arrived in late August 1619. The White Lion, a privateer ship owned by Robert Rich, 2nd Earl of Warwick but flying a Dutch flag, docked at what is now Old Point Comfort (located in modern-day Hampton) with approximately 20 Africans. They were captives from the area of present-day Angola and had been seized by the privateer's crew from a Portuguese slave ship, the "São João Bautista". To obtain the Africans, the Jamestown colony traded provisions with the ship. Some number of these individuals appear to have been treated like indentured servants, since slave laws were not passed until later, in 1641 in Massachusetts and in 1661 in Virginia. But from the beginning, in accordance with the custom of the Atlantic slave trade, most of this relatively small group, appear to have been treated as slaves, with "African" or "negro" becoming synonymous with "slave". Virginia enacted laws concerning runaway slaves and 'negroes' in 1672.

A number of the colony's early Africans earned freedom by fulfilling a work contract or for converting to Christianity. At least one of these, Anthony Johnson, in turn, acquired slaves or indentured servants for workers himself. Historians such as Edmund Morgan say this evidence suggests that racial attitudes were much more flexible in early 17th-century Virginia than they would later become. A 1625 census recorded 23 Africans in Virginia. In 1649 there were 300, and in 1690 there were 950. Over this period, legal distinctions between white indentured servants and "Negros" widened into lifelong and inheritable chattel-slavery for Africans and people of African descent.

=== New England ===
The 1677 work The Doings and Sufferings of the Christian Indians documented how hundreds of Praying Indians, who were allied with the New England Colonies, were enslaved and sent to the West Indies in the aftermath of King Philip's War by the colonists. Captive indigenous opponents, including women and children, were also sold into slavery at a substantial profit, to be transported to West Indies colonies.

African and Native American slaves made up a smaller part of the New England economy, which was based on yeoman farming and trades, than in the South, and a smaller fraction of the population, but they were present. Most were house servants, but some worked at farm labor. The Puritans codified slavery in 1641. The Massachusetts Bay royal colony passed the Body of Liberties, which prohibited slavery in some instances, but did allow three legal bases of slavery. Slaves could be held if they were captives of war, if they sold themselves into slavery, were purchased from elsewhere, or if they were sentenced to slavery by the governing authority. The Body of Liberties used the word "strangers" to refer to people bought and sold as slaves, as they were generally not native born English subjects. Colonists came to equate this term with Native Americans and Africans.

The New Hampshire General Court passed "An Act To Prevent Disorders In The Night" in 1714, prefiguring the development of sundown towns in the United States:

Whereas great disorders, insolencies and burglaries are oft times raised and committed in the night time by Indian, Negro, and Molatto Servants and Slaves to the Disquiet and hurt of her Majesty's subjects, No Indian, Negro, or Molatto is to be from Home after 9 o'clock.

Notices emphasizing and re-affirming the curfew were published in The New Hampshire Gazette in 1764 and 1771.

=== New York and New Jersey ===
The Dutch West India Company introduced slavery in 1625 with the importation of eleven enslaved blacks who worked as farmers, fur traders, and builders to New Amsterdam (present day New York City), capital of the nascent province of New Netherland. The Dutch colony expanded across the North River (Hudson River) to Bergen (in today's New Jersey). Later, slaves were also held privately by settlers in the area. Although enslaved, the Africans had a few basic rights and families were usually kept intact. They were admitted to the Dutch Reformed Church and married by its ministers, and their children could be baptized. Slaves could testify in court, sign legal documents, and bring civil actions against whites. Some were permitted to work after hours earning wages equal to those paid to white workers. When the colony fell to the English in the 1660s, the company freed all its slaves, which created an early nucleus of free Negroes in the area.

The English continued to import slaves to New York. Slaves in the colony performed a wide variety of skilled and unskilled jobs, mostly in the burgeoning port city and surrounding agricultural areas. While the existing page emphasizes slavery in plantation-based economies, slavery in northern colonies had distinct characteristics in non-agrarian contexts. In ports like New York City, enslaved Africans constituted approximately 20% of the population by 1740, working as dockworkers, blacksmiths, and in shipbuilding. In 1703 more than 42% of New York City's households held slaves, a percentage higher than in the cities of Boston and Philadelphia, and second only to Charleston in the South.

=== Midwest, Mississippi River, and Louisiana ===
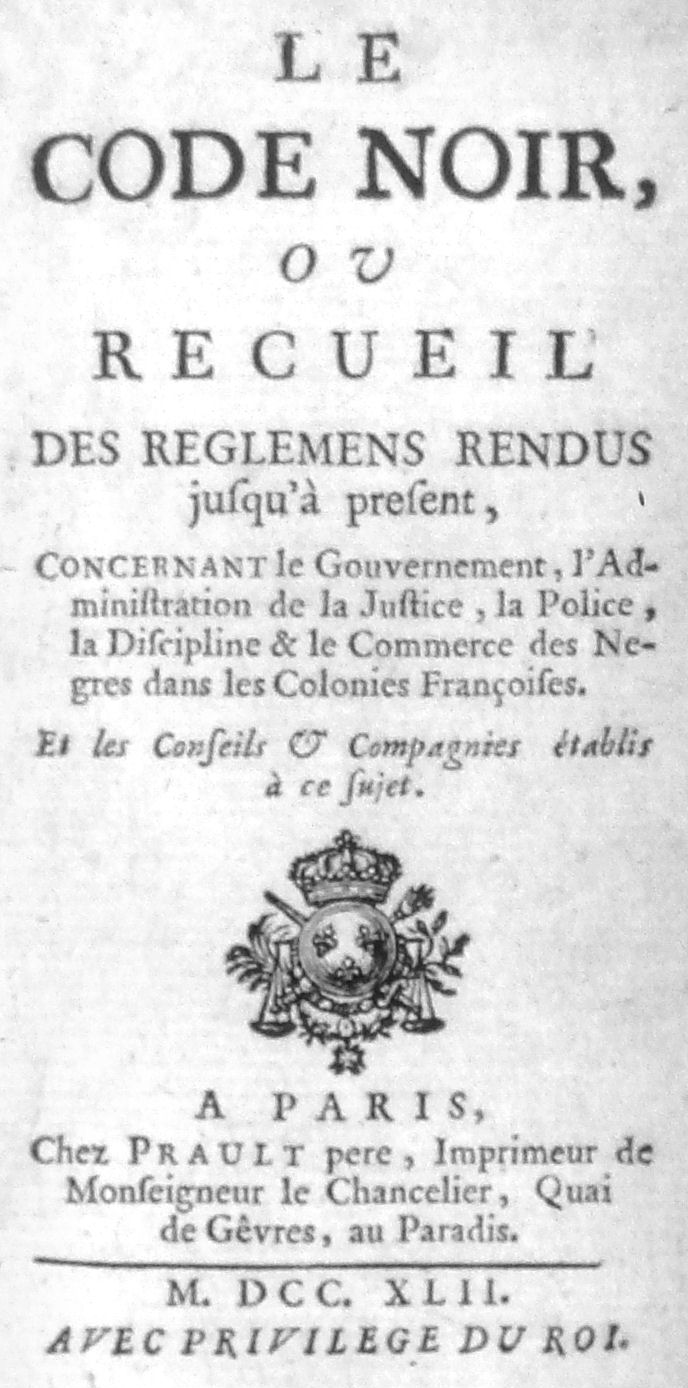
A frontispiece of the Code Noir, from the 1742 edition

The French introduced legalized slavery into their colonies in New France both near the Great Lakes and the Mississippi River. They also used slave labor on their island colonies in the Caribbean: Guadeloupe and especially Saint-Domingue. After the port of New Orleans was founded in 1718 with access to the Gulf Coast, French colonists imported more African slaves to the Illinois Country for use as agricultural or mining laborers. By the mid-eighteenth century, slaves accounted for as much as one-third of the limited population in that rural area.

Slavery was much more extensive in lower colonial Louisiana, where the French developed sugar cane plantations along the Mississippi River. Slavery was maintained during the French (1699–1763, and 1800–1803) and Spanish (1763–1800) periods of government. The first people enslaved by the French were Native Americans, but they could easily escape into the countryside which they knew well. Beginning in the early 18th century, the French imported Africans as laborers in their efforts to develop the colony. Mortality rates were high for both colonists and Africans, and new workers had to be regularly imported.

Implemented in colonial Louisiana in 1724, Louis XIV's Code Noir regulated the slave trade and the institution of slavery in the French colonies. As a result, Louisiana and the Mobile, Alabama areas developed very different patterns of slavery compared to the British colonies.

As written, the Code Noir gave some rights to slaves, including the right to marry. Although it authorized and codified cruel corporal punishment against slaves under certain conditions, it forbade slave owners from torturing slaves, separating married couples, and separating young children from their mothers. It required owners to instruct slaves in the Catholic faith, implying that Africans were human beings endowed with a soul, an idea that had not been acknowledged until then.

The Code Noir forbade interracial marriages, but interracial relationships were formed in La Louisiane from the earliest years. In New Orleans society particularly, a formal system of concubinage, known as plaçage, developed. Usually formed between young white men and African or African-American women, these relationships were formalized with contracts that sometimes provided for freedom for a woman and her children (if she was still enslaved), education for the mixed-race children of the union, especially boys; and sometimes a property settlement. Free people of color became an intermediate social caste between whites and enslaved blacks; many practiced artisan trades, and some acquired educations and property. Some white fathers sent their mixed-race sons to France for education in military schools.

Gradually in the English colonies, slavery became known as a racial caste system that generally encompassed all people of African descent, including those of mixed race. From 1662, Virginia defined social status by the status of the mother, unlike in England, where under common law fathers determined the status of their children, whether legitimate or natural. Thus, under the doctrine of partus sequitur ventrum, children born to enslaved mothers were considered slaves, regardless of their paternity. Similarly, children born to mothers who were free were also free, whether or not of mixed-race. At one time, Virginia had prohibited enslavement of Christian individuals, but lifted that restriction with its 1662 law. In the 19th century, laws were passed to restrict the rights of free people of color and mixed-race people (sometimes referred to as mulattoes) after early slave revolts. During the centuries of slavery in the British colonies, the number of mixed-race slaves increased.

== Slave rebellions ==
Colonial slave rebellions before 1776, or before 1801 in Louisiana, include:

- San Miguel de Gualdape (1526)
- Gloucester County Conspiracy (1663)
- New York Slave Revolt of 1712
- Samba rebellion (1731)
- Stono Rebellion (1739)
- New York Conspiracy of 1741
- Pointe Coupée Conspiracy (1791)
- Pointe Coupée Conspiracy (1795)

== 16th century ==
While the British knew about Spanish and Portuguese slave trading, they did not implement slave labor in the Americas until the 17th century. British travelers were fascinated by the dark-skinned people they found in West Africa; they developed mythologies that situated them in their view of the cosmos. The first Africans to arrive in England came voluntarily in 1555 with John Lok (an ancestor of the famous philosopher John Locke). Lok intended to teach them English in order to facilitate the trading of material goods with West Africa. This model gave way to a slave trade initiated by John Hawkins, who captured 300 Africans and sold them to the Spanish. Blacks in England were marginalized but some remained free, as slavery was never authorized by law in England.

In 1607, the English established Jamestown as their first permanent colony on the North American continent. Tobacco became the chief commodity crop of the colony, due to the efforts of John Rolfe in 1611. Once it became clear that tobacco was going to drive the Jamestown economy, more workers were needed for the labor-intensive crop. British plantation owners in North America and the Caribbean also needed a workforce for their cash crop plantations, which was initially filled by indentured servants from Britain before transitioning to Native American and West African slave labor. During this period, the English established colonies in Barbados in 1624 and Jamaica in 1655. These and other Caribbean colonies generated wealth by the production of sugar cane, as sugar was in high demand in Europe. They also were an early center of the slave trade for the growing English colonial empire.

English colonists entertained two lines of thought simultaneously toward indigenous Native Americans. Because these people were lighter-skinned, they were seen as more European and therefore as candidates for civilization. At the same time, because they were occupying the land desired by colonists, they were from the beginning, frequent targets of colonial violence. At first, indentured servants were used for labor. These servants provided up to seven years of service in exchange for having their trip to Jamestown paid for by someone in Jamestown. The person who paid was granted additional land in headrights, dependent on how many persons he paid to travel to the colony. Once the seven years were over, the indentured servant who survived was free to live in Jamestown as a regular citizen. However, colonists began to see indentured servants as too costly, in part because the high mortality rate meant the force had to be resupplied. In addition, an improving economy in England reduced the number of persons who were willing to sign up as indentured servants for the harsh conditions in the colonies.

=== Ottoman Empire ===
During this period, the Ottoman Empire in Northern Africa was expanding its territory as an economic power. Hayreddin Barbarossa, who united Algeria and Tunisia as military states, promoted piracy and the slave trade. During this period, Algerian and Tunisian pirates joined forces, and by 1650 more than 30,000 of their captives were imprisoned in Algiers alone. Many of these prisoners would be sold to European slave traders and shipped to America's Spanish colonies to work on tobacco plantations.

Pirate raids for the acquisition of slaves occurred mainly in Africa's Atlantic towns and villages, as well as in Europe. From around 1500, the pirates also conducted raids on seaside towns and villages of Italy, Spain, Greece, Ireland, and as far away as Iceland, capturing men, women, and children, and these raids lasted as late as the early 19th century. Robert Davis estimated that between 1 and 1.25 million Europeans were captured by pirates and sold as slaves in Tunis, Algiers, and Tripoli during this time period. However, there is no record of white slaves in the Americas.

== 17th century ==
In 1619, the English privateer White Lion, with Dutch letters of marque, brought 20 Africans seized Portuguese slave ship to Point Comfort. Several colonial colleges held enslaved people as workers and relied on them to operate.

=== The development of slavery in 17th-century America ===
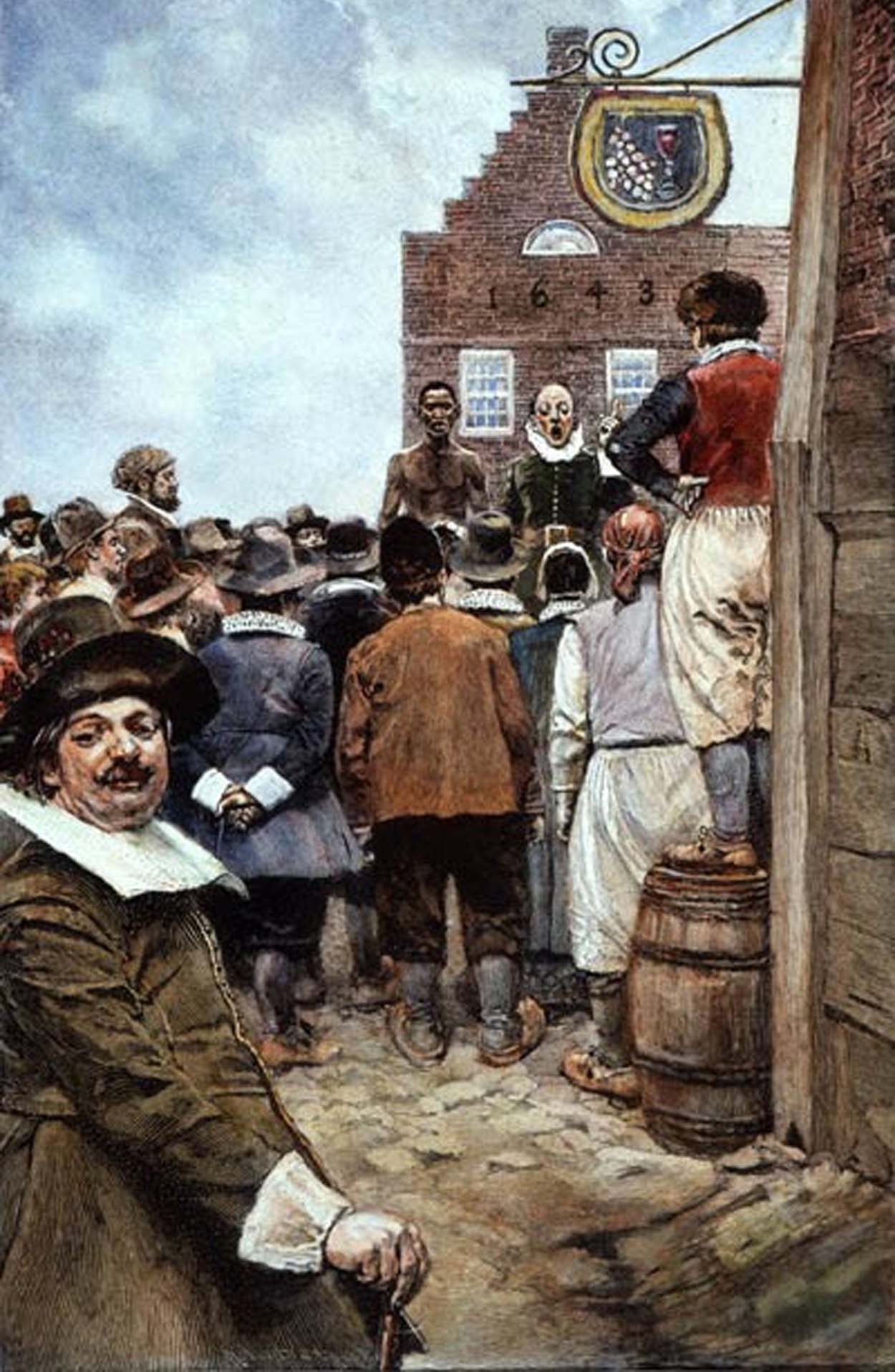
The First Slave Auction at New Amsterdam in 1655, an illustration by Howard Pyle

The laws relating to slavery and their enforcement hardened in the second half of the 17th century, and the prospects for Africans and their descendants grew increasingly dim. By 1640, the Virginia courts had sentenced at least one black servant, John Punch, to slavery. In 1656 Elizabeth Key won a suit for freedom based on her father's status as a free Englishman, his having baptized her as Christian in the Church of England, and the fact that he established a guardianship for her that was supposed to be a limited indenture. Following her case, in 1662 the Virginia House of Burgesses passed a law with the doctrine of partus, stating that any child born in the colony would follow the status of its mother, bond or free. This overturned a long held principle of English common law, whereby a child's status followed that of the father. It removed any responsibility for the children from white fathers who had abused and raped slave women. Most did not acknowledge, support, or emancipate their resulting children.

During the second half of the 17th century, the British economy improved and the supply of British indentured servants declined, as poor Britons had better economic opportunities at home. At the same time, Bacon's Rebellion of 1676 led the planter class to worry about the prospective dangers of creating a large class of restless, landless, and relatively poor white men (most of them former indentured servants). Wealthy Virginia and Maryland planters began to buy slaves in preference to indentured servants during the 1660s and 1670s, and poorer planters followed suit by c. 1700. (Slaves cost more than servants, so initially only the wealthy could invest in slaves.) The first European colonists in Carolina introduced African slavery into the colony in 1670, the year the colony was founded, and Charleston ultimately became the busiest slave port in North America. Slavery spread from the South Carolina Lowcountry first to Georgia, then across the Deep South as Virginia's influence had crossed the Appalachians to Kentucky and Tennessee. Northerners also purchased slaves, though on a much smaller scale. Enslaved people outnumbered free whites in South Carolina from the early 1700s to the Civil War. An authoritarian political culture evolved to prevent slave rebellion and justify white slaveholding. Northern slaves typically dwelled in towns, rather than on plantations as in the South, and worked as artisans and artisans' assistants, sailors and longshoremen, and domestic servants.

In 1672, King Charles II of England rechartered the Royal African Company (which had been originally established in 1660), granting the company an exclusive monopoly on all English trade with Africa, which included the slave trade. This monopoly was overturned by an Act of Parliament in 1697. The slave trade to the mid-Atlantic colonies increased substantially in the 1680s, and by 1710 the African population in Virginia had increased to 23,100 (42% of total); Maryland contained 8,000 Africans (23% of total). During the early 18th century, Britain passed Spain and Portugal to become the world's leading slave-trading nation.

The North American royal colonies not only imported Africans but also captured Native Americans, impressing them into slavery. Many Native Americans were shipped as slaves to the Caribbean. Many of these slaves from the British colonies were able to escape by heading south, to the Spanish colony of Florida. There they were given their freedom if they declared their allegiance to the King of Spain and accepted the Catholic Church. In 1739 Fort Mose was established by African-American freedmen and became the northern defense post for St. Augustine. The fort was destroyed during the War of Jenkins' Ear in 1740, though it was rebuilt in 1752. Because Fort Mose became a haven for escaped slaves from the Southern Colonies to the north, it is considered a precursor site of the Underground Railroad.

Chattel slavery developed in British North America before the full legal apparatus that supported slavery did. During the late 17th century and early 18th century, harsh new slave codes limited the rights of African slaves and cut off their avenues to freedom. The first full-scale slave code in British North America was South Carolina's (1696), which was modeled on the colonial Barbados slave code of 1661. It was updated and expanded regularly throughout the 18th century.

A 1691 Virginia law prohibited slaveholders from emancipating slaves unless they paid for the freedmen's transportation out of Virginia. Virginia criminalized interracial marriage in 1691, and subsequent laws abolished free blacks' rights to vote, hold office, and bear arms. Virginia's House of Burgesses established the basic legal framework for slavery in 1705.

=== The Atlantic slave trade to North America ===
Of the enslaved Africans brought to the New World an estimated 5–7% ended up in British North America. The vast majority of slaves transported across the Atlantic Ocean were sent to the Caribbean sugar colonies, Brazil, or Spanish America. Throughout the Americas, but especially in the Caribbean, tropical disease took a large toll on their population and required large numbers of replacements. Many Africans had limited natural immunity to yellow fever and malaria; but malnutrition, poor housing, inadequate clothing allowances, and overwork contributed to a high mortality rate.

In British North America, the enslaved population rapidly increased via the birth rate, whereas in the Caribbean colonies they did not. The lack of proper nourishment, being suppressed sexually, and poor health are possible reasons. Of the small numbers of babies born to slaves in the Caribbean, only about 1 in 4 survived the miserable conditions on sugar plantations. It was not only the major colonial powers of Western Europe such as France, Great Britain, Spain, Portugal, and the Dutch Republic that were involved. Other countries, including Sweden and Denmark–Norway, also participated in the Atlantic slave trade, though on a much more limited scale.

English and Dutch slavers, who had supplied England's nearby Caribbean Island sugar plantations with African slaves, looked upon the expanding American colonies as a lucrative new market. The Dutch-Jewish Yulee and Levy families made a name for themselves in the slave trade with the British American colonies. These families were some of the earliest and most established slavers to sell to colonists. The two families established their early operations on St. Thomas in the Danish West Indies in the late 1700s. Moses Elias Levy, the family patriarch, is said to have amassed a fortune managing his local slave trade businesses throughout the late 1700s and early 1800s.

=== Sexual role differentiation and slavery ===
"Depending upon their age and gender, slaves were assigned a particular task, or tasks, that had to be completed during the course of the day." In certain settings, men would participate in the hard labor, such as working on the farm, while women would generally work in the household. They would "be sent out on errands but in most cases their jobs required that they spend much of their time within their owner's household." These gender distinctions were mainly applied in the Northern colonies and on larger plantations. In Southern colonies and smaller farms, however, women and men typically engaged in the same roles, both working in the tobacco crop fields for example.

Although slave women and men in some areas performed the same type of day-to-day work, "[t]he female slave ... was faced with the prospect of being forced into sexual relationships for the purpose of reproduction." This reproduction would either be forced between one African slave and another, or between the slave woman and the owner. Slave owners saw slave women in terms of prospective fertility. That way, the number of slaves on a plantation could multiply without having to purchase another African. Unlike the patriarchal society of white Anglo-American colonists, "slave families" were more matriarchal in practice. "Masters believed that slave mothers, like white women, had a natural bond with their children that therefore it was their responsibility—more so than that of slave fathers—to care for their offspring." Therefore, women had the extra responsibility, on top of their other day-to-day work, to take care of children. Men, in turn, were often separated from their families. "At the same time that slaveholders promoted a strong bond between slave mothers and their children, they denied to slave fathers their paternal rights of ownership and authority..." Biological families were often separated by sale.

=== Indentured servitude ===
Some historians such as Edmund Morgan and Lerone Bennett have suggested that indentured servitude provided a model for slavery in the 17th-century Crown colonies. In practice, indentured servants were teenagers in England whose fathers sold their labor voluntarily for a period of time (typically four to seven years), in return for free passage to the colonies, room and board and clothes, and training in an occupation. After that, they received cash, clothing, tools, and/or land, and became ordinary settlers.

=== The Quaker petition against slavery ===
In 1688, four German Quakers in Germantown, a town outside Philadelphia, wrote a petition against the existence of slavery in the Province of Pennsylvania. They presented the petition to their local Quaker Meeting, and the Meeting was sympathetic, but could not decide what the appropriate response should be. The Meeting passed the petition up the chain of authority to the Philadelphia Yearly Meeting, where it continued to be ignored. It was archived and forgotten for 150 years.

The Quaker petition was the first public American document of its kind to protest slavery. It was also one of the first public declarations of universal human rights.

== 18th century ==
During the Great Awakening of the late eighteenth century, Methodist and Baptist preachers toured in the South, trying to persuade planters to manumit their slaves on the basis of equality in God's eyes. They also accepted slaves as members and preachers of new chapels and churches. The first black churches (all Baptist) in what became the United States were founded by slaves and free blacks in Aiken County, South Carolina, in 1773; Petersburg, Virginia, in 1774; and Savannah, Georgia, in 1778, before the end of the Revolutionary War.

Slavery was officially recognized as a serious offense in 1776 by the Philadelphia Yearly Meeting of Quakers. The Yearly Meeting had been against slavery since the 1750s.

=== East Indian slaves ===
In the early 21st century, new research has revealed that small numbers of East Indians were brought to the Thirteen Colonies as slaves, during the period when both India and the colonies were under British control. As an example, an ad in the Virginia Gazette of August 4, 1768, describes one young "East Indian" as "a well made fellow, about 5 feet 4 inches high" who had "a thin visage, a very sly look, and a remarkable set of fine white teeth." Another slave is identified as "an East India negro man" who speaks French and English. Most of the Indian slaves were already converted to Christianity, were fluent in English, and took western names. Their original names and homes are not known, though some of them reportedly came from Bombay and Bengal. Their descendants have mostly merged with the African-American community, which also incorporated European ancestors. Today, descendants of such East Indian slaves may have a small percent of DNA from Asian ancestors but it likely falls below the detectable levels for today's DNA tests, as most of the generations since would have been primarily of ethnic African and European ancestry.

=== Beginning of the anti-slavery movement ===
African and African-American slaves expressed their opposition to slavery through armed uprisings such as the Stono Rebellion (1739) in South Carolina. More typically, they resisted through work slowdowns, tool-breaking, and running away, either for short periods or permanently. Until the Revolutionary era, almost no white American colonists spoke out against slavery. Even the Quakers generally tolerated slaveholding (and slave-trading) until the mid-18th century, although they emerged as vocal opponents of slavery in the Revolutionary era. During the Great Awakening, Baptist and Methodist preachers in the South originally urged planters to free their slaves. In the nineteenth century, they more often urged better treatment of slaves.

== Further events ==
=== Late 18th and 19th centuries ===
During and following the Revolution, the northern states all abolished slavery, with New Jersey acting last in 1804. Some of these state jurisdictions enacted the first abolition laws in the entire New World. In states that passed gradual abolition laws, such as New York and New Jersey, children born to slave mothers had to serve an extended period of indenture into young adulthood. In other cases, some slaves were reclassified as indentured servants, effectively preserving the institution of slavery through another name.

Often citing Revolutionary ideals, some slaveholders freed their slaves in the first two decades after independence, either outright or through their wills. The proportion of free blacks rose markedly in the Upper South in this period, before the invention of the cotton gin created a new demand for slaves in the developing "Cotton Kingdom" of the Deep South.

By 1808 (the first year allowed by the Constitution to federally ban the import slave trade), all states (except South Carolina) had banned the international buying or selling of slaves. Acting on the advice of President Thomas Jefferson, who denounced the international trade as "violations of human rights which have been so long continued on the unoffending inhabitants of Africa, in which the morality, the reputation, and the best interests of our country have long been eager to proscribe", in 1807 Congress also banned the international slave trade. However, the domestic slave trade continued in the South. It brought great wealth to the South, especially to New Orleans, which became the fourth largest city in the country, also based on the growth of its port. In the antebellum years, more than one million enslaved African Americans were transported from the Upper South to the developing Deep South, mostly in the slave trade. Cotton culture, dependent on slavery, formed the basis of new wealth in the Deep South.

In 1844 the Quaker petition was rediscovered and became a focus of the burgeoning abolitionist movement.

=== Emancipation Proclamation and end of slavery in the US ===
On 1 January 1863, Abraham Lincoln signed Emancipation Proclamation freeing slaves in areas in rebellion during the American Civil War when Union troops advanced south. The Thirteenth Amendment (abolition of slavery and involuntary servitude) was ratified in December 1865.

== Social and cultural developments during the colonial period ==
=== First slave laws ===
There were no laws regarding slavery early in Virginia's history, but, in 1640, a Virginia court sentenced John Punch, an African, to life in servitude after he attempted to flee his service. The two whites with whom he fled were sentenced only to an additional year of their indenture, and three years' service to the colony. This marked the first de facto legal sanctioning of slavery in the English colonies and was one of the first legal distinctions made between Europeans and Africans.

Slaves shipped to those regions that are part of the present-day United States
Date	Slaves
1626–1650	824
1651–1675	0
1676–1700	3,327
1701–1725	3,277
1726–1750	34,004
1751–1775	84,580
1776–1800	67,443
1801–1825	109,545
1826–1850	1,850
1851–1875	476
Total	305,326

In 1641, the Massachusetts Bay Colony became the first colony to authorize slavery through enacted law. Massachusetts passed the Body of Liberties, which prohibited slavery in many instances but allowed people to be enslaved if they were captives of war, if they sold themselves into slavery or were purchased elsewhere, or if they were sentenced to slavery as punishment by the governing authority. The Body of Liberties used the word "strangers" to refer to people bought and sold as slaves; they were generally not English subjects. Colonists came to equate this term with Native Americans and Africans.

In 1654, John Casor, a black indentured servant in colonial Virginia, was the first man to be declared a slave in a civil case. He had claimed to an officer that his master, Anthony Johnson, had held him past his indenture term. Johnson himself was a free black, who had arrived in Virginia in 1621 from Portuguese Angola. A neighbor, Robert Parker, told Johnson that if he did not release Casor, he would testify in court to this fact. Under local laws, Johnson was at risk for losing some of his headright lands for violating the terms of indenture. Under duress, Johnson freed Casor. Casor entered into a seven years' indenture with Parker. Feeling cheated, Johnson sued Parker to repossess Casor. A Northampton County, Virginia court ruled for Johnson, declaring that Parker illegally was detaining Casor from his rightful master who legally held him "for the duration of his life".

=== First inherited status laws ===
During the colonial period, the status of enslaved people was affected by interpretations related to the status of foreigners in England. England had no system of naturalizing immigrants to its island or its colonies. Since persons of African origins were not English subjects by birth, they were among those peoples considered foreigners and generally outside English common law. The colonies struggled with how to classify people born to foreigners and subjects. In 1656 Virginia, Elizabeth Key Grinstead, a mixed-race woman, successfully gained her freedom and that of her son in a challenge to her status by making her case as the baptized Christian daughter of the free Englishman Thomas Key. Her attorney was an English subject, which may have helped her case (he was also the father of her mixed-race son, and the couple married after Key was freed).

In 1662, shortly after the Elizabeth Key trial and similar challenges, the Virginia royal colony approved a law adopting the principle of partus sequitur ventrem (called partus, for short), stating that any children born in the colony would take the status of the mother. A child of an enslaved mother would be born into slavery, regardless if the father were a freeborn Englishman or Christian. This was a reversal of common law practice in England, which ruled that children of English subjects took the status of the father. The change institutionalized the skewed power relationships between those who enslaved people and enslaved women, freed white men from the legal responsibility to acknowledge or financially support their mixed-race children, and somewhat confined the open scandal of mixed-race children and miscegenation to within the slave quarters.

=== First religious status laws ===
The Virginia slave codes of 1705 further defined as slaves those people imported from nations that were not Christian. Native Americans who were sold to colonists by other Native Americans (from rival tribes), or captured by Europeans during village raids, were also defined as slaves. This codified the earlier principle of non-Christian foreigner enslavement.

=== First anti-slavery causes ===
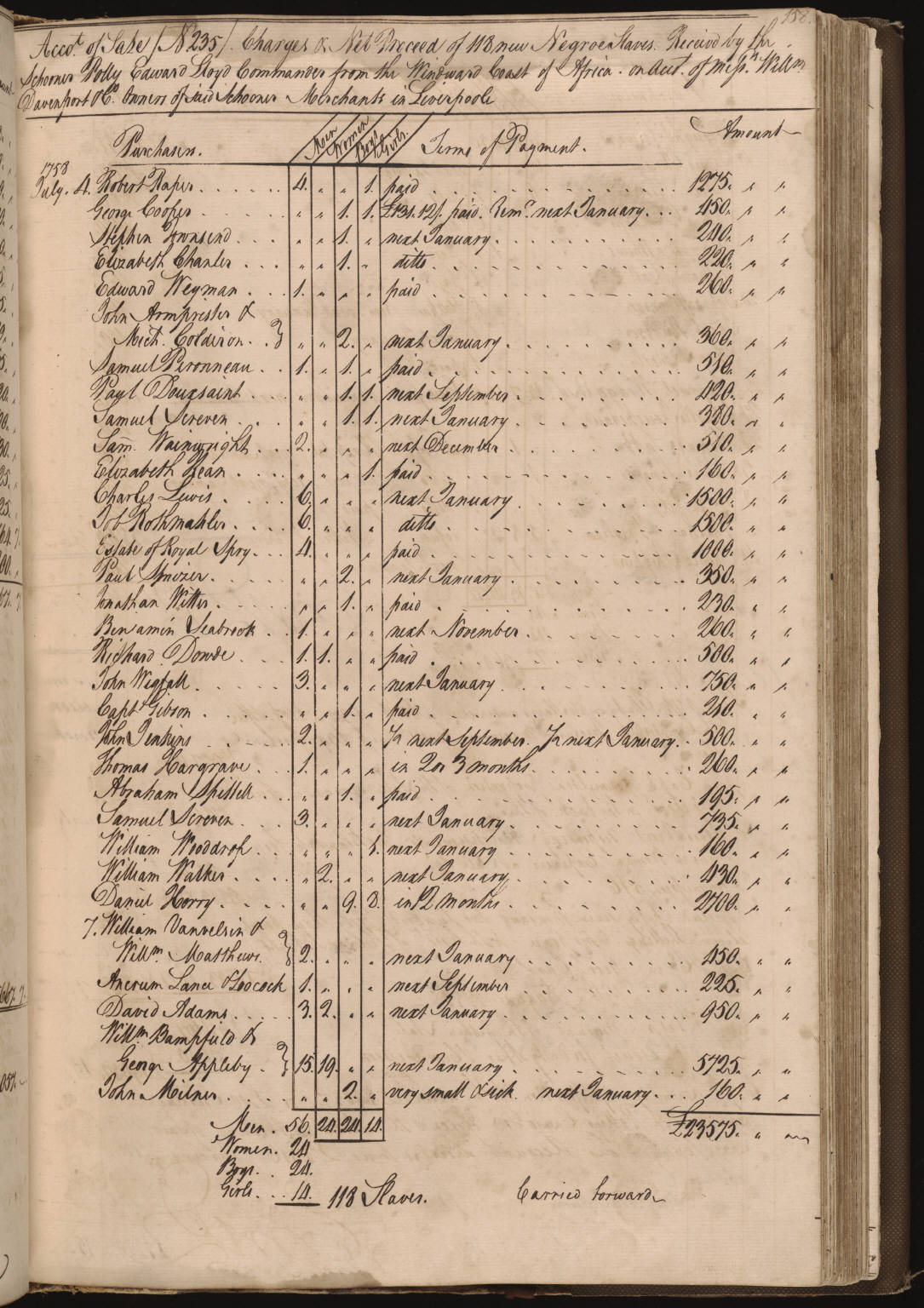
Ledger of sale of 118 slaves, Charleston, South Carolina, c. 1754

In 1735, the Georgia Trustees enacted a law prohibiting slavery in the new colony, which had been established in 1733 to enable the "worthy poor", as well as persecuted European Protestants, to have a new start. Slavery was then legal in the other 12 English colonies. Neighboring South Carolina had an economy based on the use of enslaved labor. The Georgia Trustees wanted to eliminate the risk of slave rebellions and make Georgia better able to defend against attacks from the Spanish to the south, who offered freedom to escaped enslaved people. James Edward Oglethorpe was the driving force behind the colony, and the only trustee to reside in Georgia. He opposed slavery on moral grounds as well as for pragmatic reasons, and vigorously defended the ban on slavery against fierce opposition from Carolina merchants of enslaved people and land speculators.

The Protestant Scottish highlanders who settled what is now Darien, Georgia, added a moral anti-slavery argument, which became increasingly rare in the South, in their 1739 "Petition of the Inhabitants of New Inverness". By 1750 Georgia authorized slavery in the colony because it had been unable to secure enough indentured servants as laborers. As economic conditions in England began to improve in the first half of the 18th century, workers had no reason to leave, especially to face the risks in the colonies.

=== Slavery in French Louisiana ===
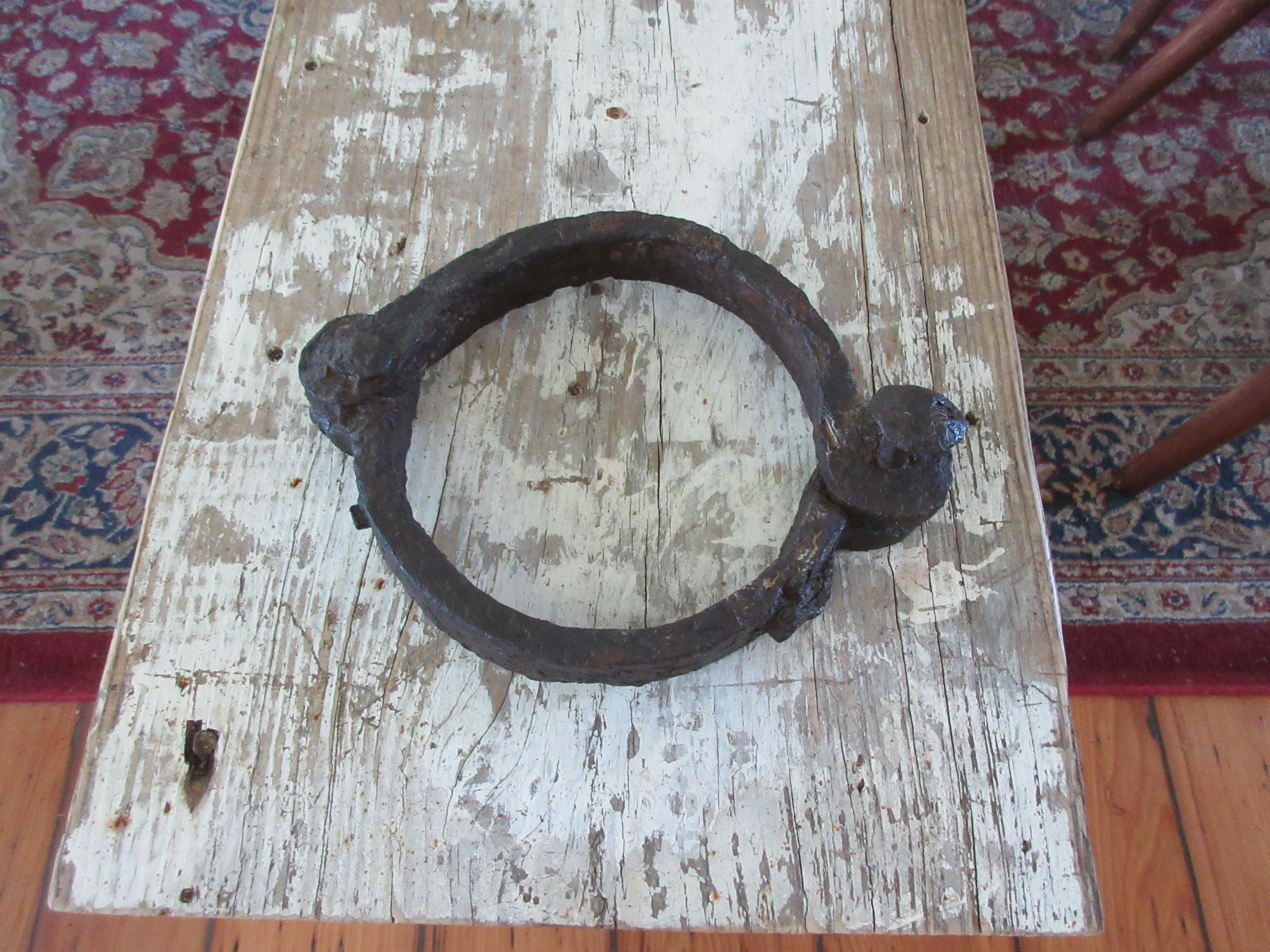
Slave shackle found while digging in a property on Baronne Street in New Orleans; donated to the Kid Ory Historic House museum

Louisiana was founded as a French colony. Colonial officials in 1724 implemented Louis XIV's Code Noir, which regulated the slave trade and the institution of slavery in New France and the French West Indies. This resulted in Louisiana, which was purchased by the United States in 1803, having a different pattern of slavery than the rest of the United States. As written, the Code Noir gave some rights to slaves, including the right to marry. Although it authorized and codified cruel corporal punishment against slaves under certain conditions, it forbade slave owners from torturing them, separating married couples, or separating young children from their mothers. It also required owners to instruct slaves in the Catholic faith.

Together with a more permeable historic French system that allowed certain rights to gens de couleur libres (free people of color), who were often born to white fathers and their mixed-race concubines, a far higher percentage of African Americans in Louisiana were free as of the 1830 census (13.2% in Louisiana compared to 0.8% in Mississippi, whose population was dominated by white Anglo-Americans). Most of Louisiana's "third class" of free people of color, situated between the native-born French and mass of African slaves, lived in New Orleans. The Louisiana free people of color were often literate and educated, with a significant number owning businesses, properties, and even slaves. Although Code Noir forbade interracial marriages, interracial unions were widespread. Whether there was a formalized system of concubinage, known as plaçage, is subject to debate. The mixed-race offspring (Creoles of color) from these unions were among those in the intermediate social caste of free people of color. The English colonies, in contrast, operated within a binary system that treated mulatto and black slaves equally under the law and discriminated against free black people equally, without regard to their skin tone.

When the U.S. took over Louisiana, Americans from the Protestant South entered the territory and began to impose their norms. They officially discouraged interracial relationships (although white men continued to have unions with black women, both enslaved and free.) The "Americanization" of Louisiana gradually resulted in a binary system of race, causing free people of color to lose status as they were grouped with the slaves. They lost certain rights as they became classified by American whites as officially "black".

=== Early abolitionism ===
The first voices to advocate the abolition of slavery were Puritans. For example, in 1700, Massachusetts judge and Puritan Samuel Sewall published "The Selling of Joseph," the first antislavery tract written in America. In it, Sewall condemns slavery and the slave trade and refutes many of the era's typical justifications for slavery.

The Puritan influence on slavery was still strong at the time of the American Revolution and beyond. In the decades leading up to the American Civil War, abolitionists such as Theodore Parker, Ralph Waldo Emerson, Henry David Thoreau and Frederick Douglass repeatedly used the Puritan heritage of the country to bolster their cause. The most radical anti-slavery newspaper, The Liberator, invoked the Puritans and Puritan values over a thousand times. Parker, in urging New England Congressmen to support the abolition of slavery, writes "The son of the Puritan ... is sent to Congress to stand up for Truth and Right ..."

There was legal agitation against slavery in the Thirteen Colonies starting in 1752 by lawyer Benjamin Kent, whose cases were recorded by one of his understudies, the future president John Adams. Kent represented numerous slaves in their attempts to gain their freedom. He handled the case of a slave, Pompey, suing his master. In 1766, Kent was the first lawyer in the United States to win a case to free a slave, Jenny Slew. He also won a trial in the Old County Courthouse for a slave named Ceasar Watson (1771). Kent also handled Lucy Pernam's divorce and the freedom suits of Rose and Salem Orne.

In Massachusetts, slavery was successfully challenged in court in 1783 in a freedom suit by Quock Walker; he said that slavery was in contradiction to the state's new constitution of 1780 providing for equality of men. Freed slaves were subject to racial segregation and discrimination in the North, and in many cases they did not have the right to vote until ratification of the Fifteenth Amendment in 1870.

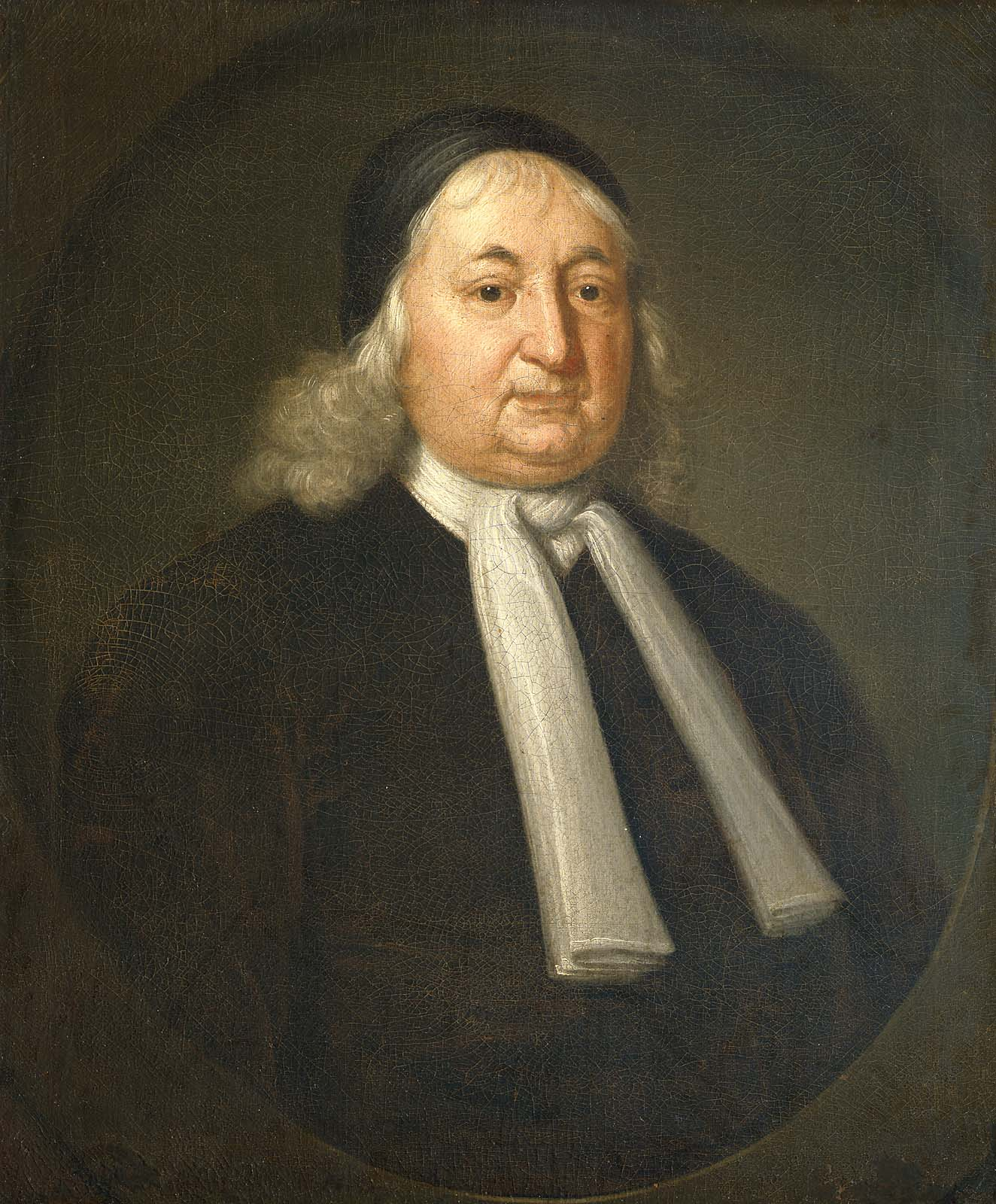
Judge Samuel Sewall, whose essay "The Selling of Joseph" criticized slavery in 1700 (portrait by John Smibert, Museum of Fine Arts, Boston Massachusetts).

== See also ==
- Abolitionism in the United States
- Atlantic Creole
- Biography and the Black Atlantic
- Colonial history of the United States
- Female slavery in the United States
- Free Negro
- Grand Model for the Province of Carolina
- History of labor law in the United States
- History of slavery in Connecticut
- History of slavery in Florida
- History of slavery in Georgia
- History of slavery in Maryland
- History of slavery in Massachusetts
- History of slavery in New Jersey
- History of slavery in New York
- History of slavery in Pennsylvania
- History of slavery in Rhode Island
- History of slavery in Virginia
  - Slavery at Tuckahoe plantation
- Indentured servitude in the Americas
  - Redemptioner
- Mississippian shatter zone
- Scramble (slave auction)
- Seasoning (slavery)
- Slave Trade Act
- Slavery among Native Americans in the United States
  - Indian slave trade in the American Southeast
- Slavery at common law
- Slavery in the British and French Caribbean
- Slavery in the Spanish New World colonies
- Slavery in the United States
- Nadir of American race relations
- Abolition of slavery timeline
- American Descendants of Slavery (ADOS)
- Glossary of American slavery
