= John Punch (slave) =

First official slave in the Thirteen Colonies

- Born: c. 1605
- Died: c. 1650 (aged c. 45); York County, Virginia, England
- Known for: First official slave in the Thirteen Colonies

John Punch (c. 1605 – c. 1650), also referred to as John Bunch, was an African-descended (and possibly African-born) resident of the English colony of Virginia who became its first person legally enslaved under its criminal law. In contrast, John Casor became the colonies' first person legally enslaved under civil law, having committed no crime.

Thought to have been an indentured servant with recent ancestry from present-day Cameroon, or possibly born there himself, Punch attempted to escape to Maryland and was sentenced in July 1640 by the Virginia Governor's Council to serve as a slave for the remainder of his life. The two European men who ran away with him received a lighter sentence of extended indentured servitude. For this reason, some historians consider Punch the "first official slave in the English colonies," and his case as the "first legal sanctioning of lifelong slavery in the Chesapeake." Some historians also consider this to be one of the first legal distinctions between Europeans and Africans made in the colony, and a key milestone in the development of the institution of slavery in the United States.

In July 2012, Ancestry.com published a paper suggesting that John Punch was a twelfth-generation great grandfather of U.S. President Barack Obama on his mother's side, based on historical and genealogical research and Y-DNA analysis. Punch's descendants were known by the Bunch or Bunche surname. Punch is also believed to be one of the paternal ancestors of the 20th-century American diplomat Ralph Bunche, the first African American to win the Nobel Peace Prize.

== Context ==
Africans were first brought to Jamestown, Virginia, in 1619. However, their status as slaves or indentured servants remains unclear. Philip S. Foner pointed out the differing perceptions held by historians, saying:

slavery existed in Florida long before 1619. the very first arrival of the Negro in 1619, was preceded by Spain in Florida. but others are of the opinion that the institution did not develop until the 1660s and that the status of the Negro until then was that of an indentured servant. Still others believe that the evidence is too sketchy to permit any definite conclusion either way.

Historian Alden T. Vaughan also recognizes differing opinions over when the institution of slavery started. Still, he says that most scholars agree that both free and enslaved black people were found in the Virginia colony by 1640, noting, "On the first point—the status of blacks before the passage of the slave laws—the issue is not whether some were free or some were slave. Almost everyone acknowledges the existence of both categories by the 1640s, if not from the beginning."

== Life ==
John Punch was a servant of Virginia planter Hugh Gwyn, a wealthy landowner, justice, and member of the House of Burgesses, representing Charles River County (which became York County in 1642).

In 1640, Punch ran away to Maryland accompanied by two of Gwyn's European indentured servants. All three were caught and returned to Virginia. On July 9, the Virginia Governor's Council, which served as the colony's highest court, sentenced both Europeans to extend their indenture terms by another four years each. However, they sentenced Punch to "serve his said master or his assigns for the time of his natural Life here or elsewhere". In addition, the council sentenced the three men to thirty lashes each.

== Sentenced to life ==
The General Court of The Governor's Council provided this verdict on July 9, 1640.

Whereas Hugh Gwyn hath by order from this Board brought back from Maryland three servants formerly run away from the said Gwyn, the court doth therefore order that the said three servants shall receive the punishment of whipping and have thirty stripes apiece. One called Victor, a Dutchman, the other a Scotchman called James Gregory, shall first serve out their times with their master according to their Indentures, and one whole year apiece after the time of their service is expired by their said indentures in recompense of his loss sustained by their absence, and after that service to their said master is expired, to serve the colony for three whole years apiece. And that the third being a negro named John Punch shall serve his said master or his assigns for the time of his natural life here or elsewhere.

Three sources are cited in a 2012 article written by Jeffrey B. Perry, in which he quotes Ancestry.com, stating "'only one surviving [written] account ... certainly pertains to John Punch's life ... ' a paragraph from the Journal of the Executive Council of Colonial Virginia, dated July 9, 1640:"

John H. Russell defined slavery in his book The Free Negro In Virginia, 1619–1865:

The difference between a servant and a slave is elementary and fundamental. The loss of liberty to the servant was temporary; the bondage of the slave was perpetual. It is the distinction made by Beverly in 1705 when he wrote, "They are call'd Slaves in respect of the time of their Servitude, because it is for Life." Wherever, according to the customs and laws of the colony, negroes were regarded and held as servants without a future right to freedom, there we should find the beginning of slavery in that colony.

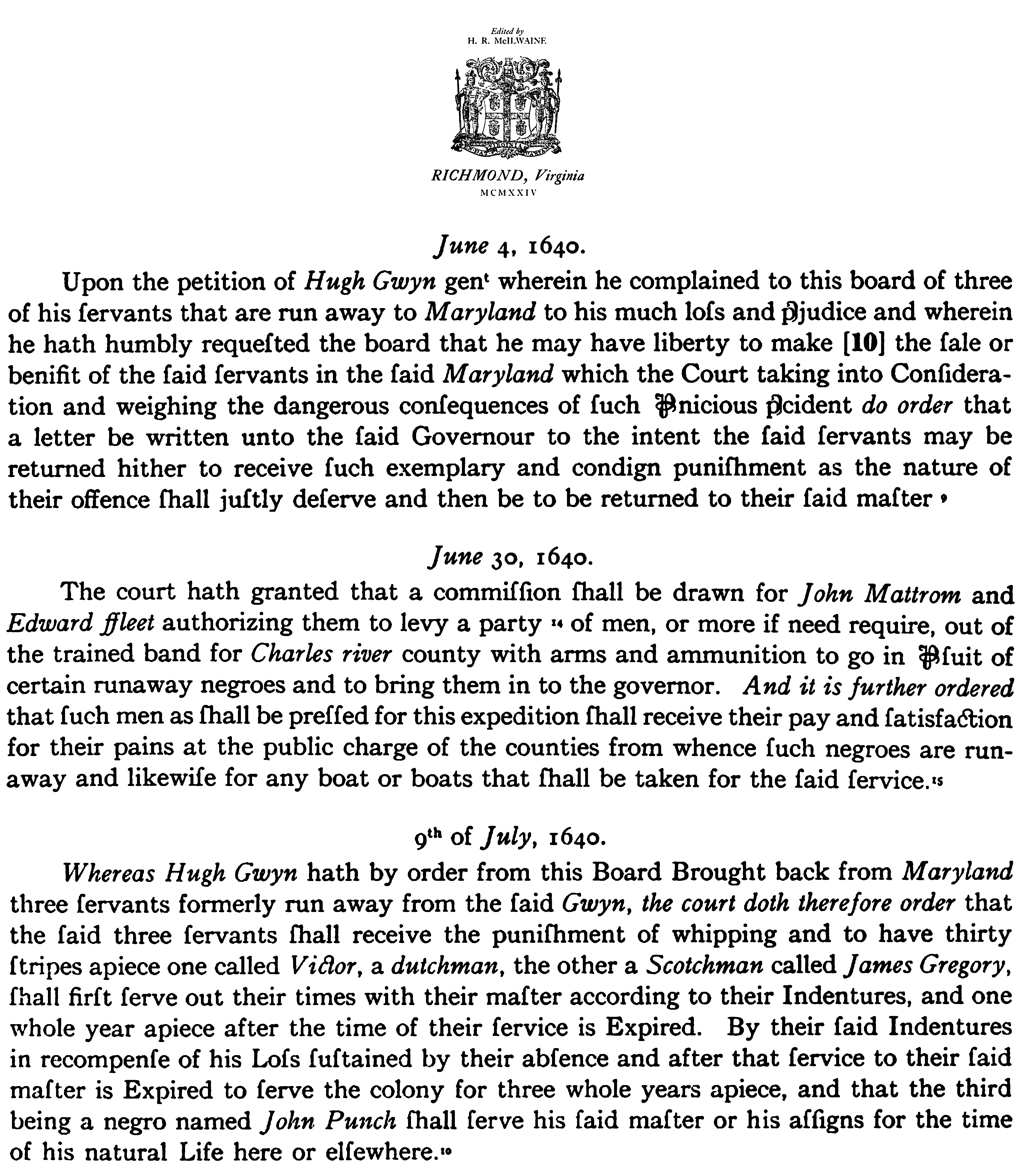
Three matters decided by the Virginia Governor's Council from June 4, 1640, through July 9, 1640

Historians have noted that John Punch ceased to be an indentured servant and was condemned to slavery, as he was sentenced to "serve his said master or his assigns for the time of his natural Life." Edgar Toppin states that "Punch, in effect, became a slave under this ruling." A. Leon Higginbotham Jr. said, "Thus, although he committed the same crime as the Dutchman and the Scotsman, John Punch, a black man, was sentenced to lifetime slavery." Winthrop Jordan also described this court ruling as "the first definite indication of outright enslavement appears in Virginia ... the third being a negro named John Punch shall serve his said master or his assigns for the time of his natural life here or elsewhere".

Theodore W. Allen notes that the court's "being a negro" justification made no explicit reference to precedent in English or Virginia common law and suggests that the court members may have been aware of common law that held a Christian could not enslave a Christian (with Punch being presumed to be a non-Christian, unlike his accomplices), wary of the diplomatic friction that would come of enslaving Christian Europeans, and possibly hopeful of replicating the lifetime indentures of enslaved Africans held in the Caribbean and South American colonies.

== Significance ==
In his A Biographical History of Blacks in America since 1528 (1971), Toppin explains the importance of Punch's case in the legal history of Virginia:

Thus, the black man, John Punch, became a slave unlike the two white indentured servants who merely had to serve a longer term. This was the first known case in Virginia involving slavery. It was significant because it was documented.

The National Park Service, in a history of Jamestown, notes that while it was a "customary practice to hold some Negroes in a form of life service," Punch was the "first documented slave for life."

Other historians have also emphasized the importance of this court decision in establishing a legal acceptance of slavery. John Donoghue said, "This can be interpreted as the first legal sanctioning of lifelong slavery in the Chesapeake." Historians consider this difference in penalties to mark the case as one of the first to make a racial distinction between black and white indentured servants. Tom Costa in his article, "Runaway Slaves and Servants in Colonial Virginia" says, "Scholars have argued that this decision represents the first legal distinction between Europeans and Africans to be made by Virginia courts."

== Indentured status ==
One historian has speculated that Punch may never have been an indentured servant. In his 1913 study of free negroes in Virginia, John Henderson Russell points out that the court decision was ambiguous. If Punch was not a servant with prospects of freedom, his sentencing was less harsh than his white accomplices. If Punch was a servant, his punishment was much more severe than that of his white accomplices. But Russell states that the "most reasonable explanation" was that the Dutchman and the Scot, being white, were given only four additional years on top of their remaining terms of indenture. At the same time, Punch, "being a negro, was reduced from his former condition of servitude for a limited time to a condition of slavery for life." Russell noted that the court did not refer to an indentured contract related to Punch, but notes that he was a "servant," and it was most reasonable that he was a limited-term servant (of some sort) before he was sentenced to "slavery for life".

In the same 2012 article referenced above, Perry says that the court ruling refers explicitly to the indentured contracts of Victor and James Gregory and extends them, while the court decision refers to John Punch only as a servant. Perry adds,

"What is likely is that" Punch "was previously subjected to limited-term chattel bond-servitude" and says "that in Virginia chattelization was imposed on free laborers, tenants, and bond-servants increasingly after 1622, that it was imposed on both European and African descended laborers, that it was a qualitative break from common law labor laws, and that the chattelization of plantation labor constituted an essential precondition of the emergence of the subsequent lifetime chattel bond-servitude imposed on African American laborers in continental Anglo-America under the system of racial slavery and racial oppression."

== Descendants ==
Drawing on a combination of historical documents and autosomal DNA analysis, Ancestry.com stated in July 2012 that there is a strong likelihood that 44th United States President Barack Obama is an eleventh-great-grandson of Punch via Obama's mother, Ann Dunham.

=== Progeniture ===
Genealogical research indicates that sometime in the 1630s, Punch married a white woman, likely also an indentured servant. By 1637, he had fathered a son called John Bunch (labeled by genealogists as "John Bunch I"). While researchers cannot definitively prove that Punch was the father of Bunch, he is the only known African man of that time and place who is a possible progenitor. Punch and his wife are the first black and white couple in the colonies who left traceable descendants. It remains possible that the father of Bunch was another African, of whom there is no record, but the similarity of the names would still need to be explained.

==== Background ====
Due to some challenges by racially mixed children of Englishmen to their enslavement, in 1662, the Virginia colony incorporated the principle of partus sequitur ventrem into slave law. This law held that children in the colonies were born into the status of their mothers; therefore, children of enslaved mothers were born into slavery, regardless of whether their fathers were free or European. In this way, slavery was made a racial caste associated with people of African ancestry. The law overturned the English common law applicable to the children of two English subjects in England, in which the father's social status determined that of the child.

At the same time, this law meant that racially mixed children of white women were born into their mother's free status. Paul Heinegg, in his Free African Americans in Virginia, North Carolina, South Carolina, Maryland and Delaware found that most families of free black people in the 1790–1810 U.S. censuses could be traced to children of white women and black men, whether free, indentured servant or slave, in colonial Virginia. Their children were born free, and the families were established as free before the American Revolution.

=== Bunch family ===
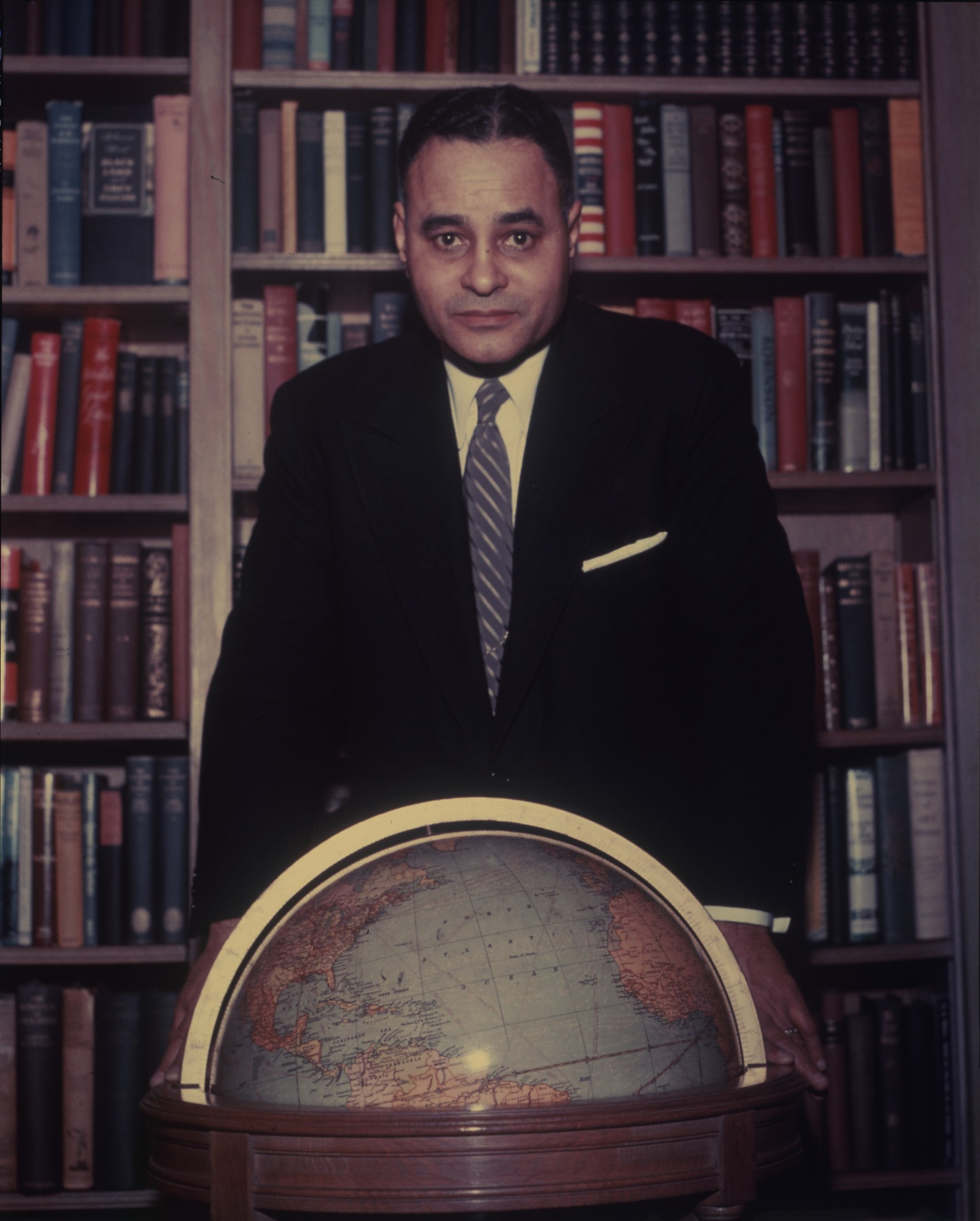
Ralph Bunch and Barack Obama are direct descendants of John Punch.

Punch's male descendants probably became known by the surname Bunch, a rare name among colonial families. Before 1640, fewer than 100 African men were in Virginia, and John Punch was the only one with a surname similar to Bunch. The Bunch descendants were free black people who became prosperous landowners in Virginia. Some lines eventually assimilated as white after generations of marrying white people.

In September 1705, a man referred to by researchers as John Bunch III petitioned the General Court of Virginia for permission to publish banns for his marriage to Sarah Slayden, a white woman. Still, their minister had refused to publish the banns. (There had been a ban on marriages between "Negros" and "White Persons", but Bunch posed a challenge, as he was the son of a white woman with only a degree of African ancestry. The petition argued that mulatto meant a person of half Negro and half white ancestry.) This John Bunch appealed the denial to the General Court of Virginia. The Court's decision is unknown. Still, the following month the government of Virginia responded by issuing a statute expanding the use of the term mulatto. It held that anyone who was a child, grandchild or great-grandchild of an African or Native American was a mulatto.

In the early nineteenth century, racially mixed people of less than one-eighth African or Native American ancestry (equivalent to one great-grandparent) were considered legally white. Many racially mixed people lived as whites in frontier areas, where they were treated following their community and fulfillment of citizen obligations. This was a looser definition than that established in 1924, when Virginia adopted the "one-drop rule" under its Racial Integrity Act, which defined as black anyone with any known black ancestry, no matter how limited.

Records do not show a marriage for John Bunch III, but the mother of one of his children was later noted as being named Rebecca. He had moved to Louisa County as part of the colonial westward migration to the frontiers of Virginia.

==== Migration to other states ====
Through continued intermarriage with white families in Virginia, the line of Obama's maternal Bunch ancestors probably were identified as white as early as 1720. Members of the family also eventually migrated into Tennessee and ultimately to Kansas, where descendants included Obama's maternal grandmother and his mother, Stanley Ann Dunham, also known as Ann Dunham.

Another line of the Bunch family migrated to North Carolina, where they were classified in some records as mulatto. The family was allied with Gideon Gibson Sr. of the Gibson family after they migrated to Chowan County from Virginia. The Bunch (sometimes spelled Bunche) family was established as free before the American Revolution. The Bunch surname lines also became associated with the core of racially mixed families later known as Melungeon in Tennessee. Members of the Melungeon branch of the Bunch family in Tennessee were related to members of the free African-American Perkins family. Both families were present in the Louisiana Redbones.

Bunch family members also lived in South Carolina by the end of the 18th and early 19th centuries. Several members of the Bunch family from South Carolina were living in Detroit, Michigan, by the 1900 and 1910 censuses, as a result of moving in the Great Migration. Researcher Paul Heinegg, known for his genealogy work on free African Americans of the colonial and early federal periods, writes that Fred Bunche was among those Bunch descendants from South Carolina, as people often migrated in related groups. His son, Ralph, born in Detroit, earned a doctorate in political science and taught at the university level. He helped plan the United Nations, mediated in Israel and later served as U.S. Minister to the United Nations, eventually awarded the Nobel Peace Prize.

==== Genetic analysis ====
Y-DNA testing of direct male descendants of the Bunch family lines has revealed a common ancestry going back to a single male ancestor of African ethnicity. Genealogists believe this male ancestor to be John Punch the African. He was probably born in present-day Cameroon in Central Africa, where his particular type of DNA is most common. Linda Heywood of the Association for the Study of African American Life and History stated that there was no Atlantic slave trade from the region that makes up Cameroon at the time, writing that the referenced DNA haplogroup markers were similarly common in Angola, where Portuguese slave trading occurred.

== See also ==
- Family of Barack Obama
- John Casor
- List of slaves
