= Julie Roy Jeffrey =

American historian

Julie Roy Jeffrey is a professor emerita and former member of the history department at Goucher College in Baltimore, Maryland. Jeffrey joined the Goucher faculty in 1972. Her scholarly interests have focused on the areas of gender history—she is considered a pioneer of the history of women in the western United States—the abolition of slavery, and the history of education.

Jeffrey has held Fulbright Chairs in American Studies in universities in Denmark and the Netherlands and received a National Endowment for the Humanities research fellowship.

Jeffrey's book, The Great Silent Army of Abolitionism, was awarded the Choice Award for Academic Book of Excellence and honorable mention for the Frederick Douglass Prize, given by the Gilder Lehrman Center of Yale University.

Jeffrey is co-author and co-editor of the widely used textbook on American History, The American People: The History of a Nation and a Society, which she has actively revised since the 1980s.

Jeffrey received her bachelor's degree from Radcliffe College of Harvard University, and received her Ph.D. from Rice University.

== Selected works ==
- "Women in the Southern Farmers' Alliance: A Reconsideration of the Role and Status of Women in the Late Nineteenth-Century South" (1975)
- Education for Children of the Poor: A Study of the Origins and Implementation of the Elementary and Secondary Education Act of 1965 (1978) ISBN 9780814202777
- Frontier Women: The Trans-Mississippi West, 1840-1880 (1979) ISBN 9780809016013
- Converting the West: A Biography of Narcissa Whitman (1991) ISBN 9780806123592
- Where Wagons Could Go: Narcissa Whitman and Eliza Spaulding (1997) with Clifford Merrill Drury ISBN 9780803266063
- The Great Silent Army of Abolitionism: Ordinary Women in the Antislavery Movement (1998) ISBN 9798890869821
- The American People: Creating a Nation and a Society: to 1877 (2006) with Gary B. Nash, John R. Howe, and Allen F. Davis ISBN 9780321337764
- American History Firsthand: Working with Primary Sources, Volume II (since 1865) (2nd Ed.) (2007) with Peter J. Frederick ISBN 9780205559930
