= John Henderson Russell =

American political science professor and author (born 1884)

John Henderson Russell (born 1884) was a professor and author in the United States. Russell was a Political Science professor at Whitman College in Walla Walla, Washington. His book The Free Negro in Virginia, 1619–1895 was published by Johns Hopkins Press in 1913. He also contributed to the article "Colored Freemen As Slave Owners in Virginia" published in 1916 in the Journal of Negro History.

== Writings ==
- The Free Negro in Virginia, 1619–1895 Johns Hopkins Press (1913)
