= Headright =

Legal grant of land given to colonists

A headright refers to a legal grant of land given to settlers during the period of European colonization in the Americas. A "headright" includes both the grant of land and the owner (the head) that claims the land. The person who has a right to the land is the one who paid to transport people to a colony. Headrights are most notable for their role in the expansion of the Thirteen Colonies; the Virginia Company gave headrights to settlers, and the Plymouth Company followed suit. The headright system was used in several colonies, including Maryland, Georgia, North Carolina and South Carolina. Most headrights were for 1 to 1,000 acres (4.0 km^{2}) of land, and were granted to those who were willing to cross the Atlantic and help populate the colonies. Headrights were granted to anyone who would pay for the transportation costs of an indentured laborer. These land grants consisted of 50 acres (0.20 km^{2}) for someone newly moving to the area and 100 acres (0.40 km^{2}) for people previously living in the area. By ensuring the landowning masters had legal ownership of all land acquired, the indentured laborers after their indenture period had passed had little opportunity to procure their own land. This kept a large portion of the citizens of the Thirteen Colonies poor and led to tensions between the laborers and the landowners.

== Cause for the headright system ==
Early colonists of Jamestown were employees of the Virginia Company and were responsible for the production and profit of the colony. Jamestown struggled initially due to the scarcity of gold and silver throughout eastern North America; however, the colony began to flourish after a focus on tobacco production began to take shape. This increase in tobacco production required many more workers to handle the labor. A disproportion between the amount of land available and the population led to a low supply of labor, resulting in the growth of indentured servitude and slavery. The Headright System was created to solve labor shortages and contributed to the success of Virginia.

== Overview of the headright system ==
The headright system began in the colony of Jamestown in 1618 as an attempt to solve labor shortages due to the advent of the tobacco economy, which required large plots of land with many workers. The headright system also served to attract new settlers. Settlers who had already been living in Virginia were each given two headrights of 50 acres (20 ha); immigrant colonists who paid for their passage were given one headright, and individuals would subsequently receive one headright each time they paid for the passage of another individual. This last mechanism increased the division between the wealthy land-owners and the working poor. Headrights were given to heads-of-households, and because 50 acres were accumulated for each member of the household, families had an incentive to make the passage to the colonies together. Although the Headright System increased the population of colonies like Virginia, it also contributed to the expansion of indentured servitude, the lower class, and slavery. After the American Revolution, the system was no longer used.

== Process of obtaining headrights ==
After paying for the passage of an individual to make it to the colonies, one needed to obtain a patent for the land. First, the governor or local county court had to provide a certificate that certified the validity of the importation of a person. One would then select the land one desired and have an official survey made. The two basic surveying instruments used to mark plots of land were a chain known as Gunter's chain and a compass. The patent's claimant would then take the description of this land to the colony's secretary, who created the patent to be approved by the governor. The patent usually included the name of the immigrants, or headrights, in the document. Once a headright was obtained, it was treated as a commodity and could be bought, sold, or traded. It also could be saved indefinitely and used at a later date.

== Eligibility ==
Individuals who could afford to do so would accumulate headrights by providing funds for poor individuals to travel to Virginia. During the 17th century, the cost of transport from England to the colonies was about six pounds per person. This system led to the development of indentured servitude where poor individuals would become workers for a specified number of years and provide labor in order to repay the landowners who had sponsored their transportation to the colonies. The claimants to headrights could receive grants for men, women and children since anyone could become an indentured servant. Early documentation from the Virginia Company seems to suggest that a landowner could receive a headright even if the indentured servant whose trip they sponsored did not make it to Virginia alive. Even after the Virginia Company was dissolved on May 24, 1624, the Privy Council ordered for patents for headrights to still be issued.

== Slavery and the headright system ==
This, along with the increase in the amount of money required to bring (European) indentured servants to the colonies, contributed to the shift towards slavery in the colonies. Until 1699, an enslaved person was worth a headright of fifty acres. According to records, in the 1670s over 400 enslaved people were used as headrights in Virginia. This number increased in the 1680s and 1690s. Many families grew in power in the colonies by receiving large tracts of land when they imported slaves. For example, George Menefie transported twenty-three slaves as part of a patent for 3,000 acres (12.1 km^{2}) in 1638. In 1699, it was decided that headrights would only be granted to free citizens and that transporting indentured laborers or slaves would no longer a guarantor of land.

== Issues with land patent records ==
According to records, there was a large discrepancy between the number of headrights issued and the number of new residents in the colonies. This gap may be explained by high mortality rates of people during their journey to the colonies. Landowners would receive headrights for the dead and thus, the gap would widen between population growth and the number of headrights issued. Another explanation suggests that the secretary's office that issued the headrights grew more lax. There were few regulations in place to keep the headright system in check. Because of this, headrights were claimed multiple times and people took advantage of the lack of governance. For instance, when a person was brought to the colonies, both the ship captain and the individual paying the transportation costs may have attempted to receive land patents or headrights for the same person. Another problem was that secretaries sometimes issued headrights for fictitious people. During the 1660s and 1670s, the number of headrights was about four times greater than the increase in population. If this large discrepancy must be attributed to more than fictitious issuing, a final explanation suggests that people had accumulated and saved headrights. Headrights could be bought for about 50 pounds of tobacco each. The owners of the grants then claimed the land years later once the land had risen in value. Although keeping a count of the number of headrights issued may not lead to accurate estimations of population growth in the colonies, the number of patents issued acts as an indicator of the demand for land.

== See also ==
- Homestead Acts
- Indentured servitude in Virginia
- Patroon
