= Laurentius =

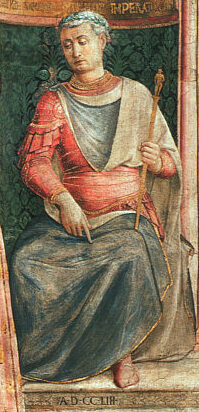
- Saint Laurentius of Rome
- Gender: Male
- Language: Latin

Origin
- Meaning: "From Laurentum", or "Laurelled"; "bright one, shining one"
- Region of origin: Italy

Other names
- Related names: Llorente/Lorente (Aragonese-Spain), Laurens (Dutch, English), Lorenz (German), Lenz (German),Lorenzo (Italian, Castilian-Spain), Laurent (French), Laurențiu (Romanian), Lourenço (Portuguese), Laurence, Lawrence (English), Lavrentiy, Lavr (Russian), Lars, Lasse, Lassi (Swedish, Finnish), Lovro (Croatian), Lorik (Albanian), Lorenc Laura, Larry (English pet form of Lawrence or Laurence)

Laurentius is a Latin given name and surname that means "From Laurentum" (a city near Rome). It is possible that the place name Laurentum is derived from the Latin laurus ("laurel"). People with the name include:

In Early Christianity:

- Lawrence of Rome, Saint Laurentius of Rome (died 258), Italian deacon and saint, born in Spain

In Catholicism:

- Antipope Laurentius (r. 498–506), antipope of the Roman Catholic Church
- Laurence of Canterbury, archbishop of Canterbury known as Saint Laurentius
- Lárentíus Kálfsson (1267–1331), bishop of Hólar, Iceland, 1324–1331
- Laurentius Abstemius, Italian writer, Professor of Belles Lettres at Urbino, and Librarian to Duke Guido Ubaldo under Pope Alexander VI
- Laurentia McLachlan, Benedictian nun, Great Britain, 1866–1953

In Byzantium:

- Joannes Laurentius Lydus, Byzantine writer on antiquarian subjects

In Poland:

- Wawrzyniec Grzymała Goślicki, Laurentius Grimaldius Gosliscius, (1530–1607), Polish bishop, political thinker and philosopher best known for his book De optimo senatore

In Lutheranism:

- Laurentius Andreae, Swedish clergyman and scholar
- Laurentius Paulinus Gothus (1565–1646), Swedish theologian, astronomer and Archbishop of Uppsala
- Laurentius Petri (1499–1573), Swedish clergyman and the first Evangelical Lutheran Archbishop of Sweden
- Laurentius Petri Gothus, the second Swedish Lutheran Archbishop of Uppsala, Sweden
- Paul Laurentius (1554–1624), Lutheran divine
- Laurentius Christophori Hornæus, minister and witch hunter in Torsåker and Ytterlännäs, Sweden

In other fields:

- Henrik Laurentius Helliesen, Norwegian Minister of Finance in several periods between 1863 and 1883
- Laurentius (weevil), a beetle genus in the tribe Apostasimerini
- Laurentius "Lou" van den Dries, Dutch mathematician

== Variants of Laurentius ==
Variants (in various languages) include:

- Lars (Germanic languages)
- Labhrás, Lorcán (Irish)
- Laur (Estonian)
- Laurens (Dutch, English, French)
- Lauri (Estonian, Finnish)
- Laurits (Danish, Estonian, German)
- Lauritz (Danish, Norwegian)
- Lárus (Icelandic)
- Laurent (French)
- Лаврентий, Лаурентий (Lavrentiy, Russian)
- Лаврентiй, Лаурентiй (Lavrentiy, Ukrainian)
- Λαυρέντιος (Lavrentios, Greek)
- Laurence (English, French)
- Lawrence, Larry, Lawrie, Lauren, Lorin, Loren (English)
- Loran, Loren (Turkish)
- Lawrence, Laurentino, Lorenso, Laurentius, Lorenzo, Laurence (Indonesian)
- Lorens (Scandinavian)
- Lorentz, Lorenz, Lenz, Loritz (German)
- Lorenzo, Lorente, Llorente (Italian, Spanish)
- Laurenti (Italian)
- Լորիս (Loris, Armenian)
- Lourenzo (Galician)
- Lourenço (Portuguese)
- Lourens (Afrikaans)
- Lőrinc (Hungarian)
- Laurențiu, Lorenț, Lorint (Romanian)
- Lauris (Latvian)
- Laurynas (Lithuanian)
- Llorenç, Llorens (Catalan)
- Vavrinec (Slovak)
- Vavřinec (Czech)
- Wawrzyniec (Polish)
- Laurenty (Polish)
- Lovro, Lovrović, Lovre (Croatian)
- Lovrenc, Lovro, Voranc (Slovenian)
- Lorik, Laurent, Laurat (Albanian)

== See also ==
- Laureano - Laurean - Laurian
- Lorena (name)
- Laura (given name)
- Laurel (given name)
- Lauren
- Laurie (given name)
- Lorie (disambiguation)
- Lorrie (given name)
- Lauri (given name)
- Lauro (disambiguation)
- Lauret (disambiguation)
- Laurus (disambiguation)
