= Lourenço (name) =

- Pronunciation: Portuguese pronunciation: [lo(w)ˈɾẽsu]
- Gender: Male
- Language: Portuguese

Origin
- Meaning: "From Laurentum", or "Laurelled"
- Region of origin: Portugal

Other names
- Related names: Lorenz (German), Lorenzo (Italian, Spanish), Laurent (French), Laurențiu (Romanian), Lawrence, Laurence

Lourenço is a Portuguese surname and masculine given name of Latin origin. It is used in Portugal and other Portuguese-speaking countries. The name was derived from the Roman surname Laurentius, which meant "from Laurentum". Laurentum was an ancient Roman city of Latium situated between Ostia and Lavinium, on the west coast of the Italian peninsula southwest of Rome.

== Notable people named Lourenço ==
=== Given name ===
- Lourenço Andrade (born 1979), Brazilian footballer
- Lourenço da Silva de Mendouça (died 1698), Mbundu nobleman and abolitionist
- Lourenço da Veiga (born 1979), Portuguese auto racing driver
- Lourenço de Almeida (c. 1480–1508), Portuguese explorer and military commander
- Lourenço Filho (1897–1970), Brazilian educator and education theorist
- Lourenço José Boaventura de Almada, 13th Count of Avranches (1758–1815), Portuguese politician
- Lourenço Marques (explorer), Portuguese trader and colonizer
- Lourenço Martins (born 1997), Portuguese volleyball player
- Lourenço Mutarelli (born 1964), Brazilian comic book artist, writer and actor
- Lourenço Ortigão (born 1989), Portuguese actor
- Lourenço Soares de Valadares (c. 1230–1298), Portuguese nobleman

=== Surname ===
- Agostinho Lourenço (1886–1964), Portuguese soldier
- Aleixo Lourenco, Indian politician
- Ana Dias Lourenço (born 1957), Angolan economist, politician and government minister
- Bruno Lourenço (born 1998), Portuguese footballer
- Carlos Lourenço (1923–2008), Portuguese sailor
- Denílson Lourenço (born 1977), Brazilian judoka
- Didier Lourenço (1968–2023), Catalan-Spanish painter
- Eduardo Lourenço (1923–2020), Portuguese essayist, professor, critic, philosopher and writer
- Fausto Lourenço (born 1987), Portuguese footballer
- Hélder Lourenço (born 1954), Portuguese footballer
- Ivone Dias Lourenço (1937–2008), Portuguese communist
- Januário Lourenço (born 1974), Portuguese jurist
- João Lourenço (disambiguation), multiple people
- José Lourenço, Canadian filmmaker
- Joyner Lourenco (born 1991), Indian footballer
- Lourenço (footballer) (born 1997), Brazilian footballer
- Lucas Lourenço (born 2001), Brazilian footballer
- Luís Lourenço (born 1983), Angolan footballer
- Miguel Lourenço (disambiguation), multiple people
- Orlando Lourenco (born 1964), Zimbabwean tennis player
- Patrick Lourenço (born 1993), Brazilian amateur boxer
- Rodolfo Lourenço (born 1991), Portuguese footballer
- Rogério Lourenço (born 1971), Brazilian football manager and player
- Ruy Lourenco (1928–2021), American physician, academic administrator, researcher and professor
- Teresa Lourenço (1330–????), Portuguese noblewoman
- Wilson R. Lourenço, French-Brazilian arachnologist
