= Richard Lorenz =

Richard Lorenz may refer to:

- Richard Lorenz (bobsleigh) (1901–?), Austrian bobsledder
- Richard Lorenz (chemist) (1863–1929), chemist from Vienna
- Richard Lorenz (artist) (1858–1915), German painter

== See also ==
- Lorenz, surname
