= Lorik =

- Gender: Male

Origin
- Meaning: "Laurelled"
- Region of origin: Albania, Kosovo, North Macedonia

Other names
- Related names: Laurentius (Latin), Laurent (French), Lorenzo (Italian), Lorenz (German), Lavrentiy (Russian), Lars (Swedish), Lasse (Danish), Lauri (Estonian, Finnish)

Lorik is a predominantly Albanian masculine given name, it is derived from the Latin name Laurentius. Notable people bearing the name Lorik include:

- Lorik Ademi (born 2001), Swedish footballer
- Lorik Cana (born 1983), Albanian footballer
- Lorik Emini (born 1999), Kosovan footballer
