= Laurențiu =

- Gender: Male
- Language: Romanian

Origin
- Meaning: "From Laurentum", or "Laurelled"
- Region of origin: Romania

Other names
- Related names: Lorenzo (Italian, Spanish), Laurent (French), Lourenço (Portuguese)

Laurențiu is a Romanian masculine given name of Latin origin. It is used in Romania. The name was derived from the Roman surname Laurentius, which meant "from Laurentum". Laurentum was an ancient Roman city of Latium situated between Ostia and Lavinium, on the west coast of the Italian peninsula southwest of Rome.

Notable people with this name include:

- Laurențiu Constantin (born 1963), Romanian rugby player
- Laurențiu Fulga (1916–1984), Romanian author
- Laurențiu Profeta (1925–2006), Romanian composer
- Laurențiu Rebega (born 1976), Romanian politician
- Laurențiu Reghecampf (born 1975), Romanian footballer
- Laurențiu Streza (born 1947), Romanian metropolitan bishop
- Laurențiu Țigăeru Roșca (born 1970), Romanian politician
