= Lorente =

Lorente is a surname. Notable people with this surname include:

- África Lorente Castillo (1954–2020), Moroccan-born Spanish politician and activist
- Aurora Lorente (born 1935), Spanish-born Venezuelan, first woman to operate an IBM mainframe computer in Venezuela (circa 1957)
- Eduardo Lorente (born 1977), Spanish swimmer and Olympian
- Jaime Lorente (born 1991), Spanish actor
- José Alfredo Lorente (born 1994), Puerto Rican singer and songwriter
- Justo Lorente (born 1994), Nicaraguan footballer
- Macarena Lorente Anaya, Spanish politician
- Maria Antonieta Lorente (born 1954), Venezuelan geologist first woman president of the Venezuelan Geological Society
- Patricio Lorente (born 1969), Argentine scholar, Wikimedian, and academic administrator
- Rafael Lorente de Nó (1902–1990), Spanish neuroscientist
- Sylvie Lorente, French mechanical engineer
- Joaquín Ruiz Lorente (born 1966), Spanish basketball player and manager

== See also ==
- Llorente (disambiguation)
