= Lorentz =

Lorentz is a name derived from the Roman surname, Laurentius, which means "from Laurentum". It is the German form of Laurence (Also spelled Lawrence). Notable people with the name include:

== Given name ==
- Lorentz Aspen (born 1978), Norwegian heavy metal pianist and keyboardist
- Lorentz Dietrichson (1834–1917), Norwegian poet and historian of art and literature
- Lorentz Eichstadt (1596–1660), German mathematician and astronomer
- Lorentz Harboe Ree (1888–1962), Norwegian architect
- Lorentz Lange (1783–1860), Norwegian judge and politician
- Lorentz Reitan (born 1946), Norwegian musicologist

== Mononym ==
- Lorentz (rapper), real name Lorentz Alexander, Swedish singer and rapper

== Surname ==
- Dominique Lorentz, French investigative journalist who has written books on nuclear proliferation
- Friedrich Lorentz, author of works on the Pomeranian language
- Geertruida de Haas, née Lorentz, Dutch physicist
- Hendrik Antoon Lorentz (1853–1928), Dutch physicist and Nobel Prize winner
- Hendrikus Albertus Lorentz (1871–1944), Dutch explorer and diplomat
- Jim Lorentz (born 1947), retired Canadian professional ice hockey centre
- Lore Lorentz (1920–1994), German cabaret artist and standup comedian
- Max Lorentz (born 1962), Swedish musician, songwriter and producer
- Pare Lorentz (1905–1992), American author and film director
- Stanisław Lorentz (1899–1991), Polish scholar of music and history of art
- Steven Lorentz (born 1996), Canadian ice hockey player

== See also ==
- Laurentius (disambiguation)
- Lorenz, spelled without the 't'
