= Lorence =

Lorence is a given name and a surname. People so named include:

- Lorence G. Collins, American petrologist
- Lorence Wenke, American politician
- David H. Lorence (1946 –), botanist known by the standard author abbreviation Lorence
- Paul F. Lorence, United States Air Force Captain
- Edna Sirius Lorence, Australian politician

== See also ==
- Charles de Lorencez, French Army general
- Lorance (disambiguation)
- Loren
- Lorenc
