= Cosmetic Spoon: Young Girl Swimming =

14th-century BC Egyptian spoon

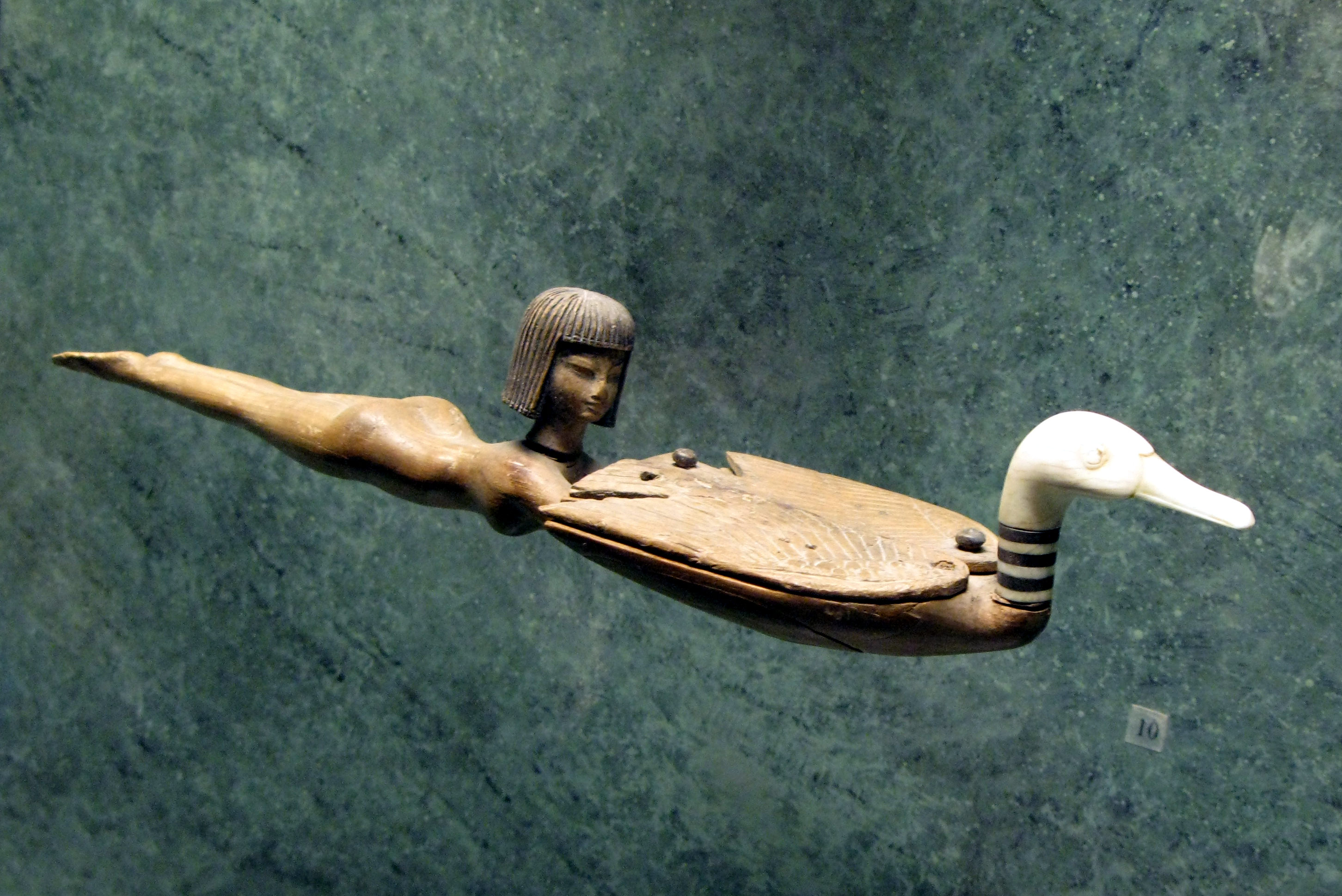
- Cosmetic spoon featuring a swimming woman holding a duck, ivory and wood
- Material: Carob wood
- Created: 1400 BC–1300 BC
- Discovered: before 1852
- Present location: Louvre Museum, Paris, France

Cosmetic Spoon: Young Girl Swimming is an ancient Egyptian carving by an unknown artist. Completed in the late Eighteenth Dynasty, sometime between 1400 BC–1300 BC, it currently resides in the Louvre, in Paris, France. It was acquired by the museum in 1852. The spoon is made from partially painted carob wood, carved in a "sculpture in the round" fashion.

These spoons are also referred to as "toilet spoons". It is believed that cosmetic spoons were used to throw myrrh onto fires as offerings to gods or to the dead.
