= Laurian =

Laurian may refer to:

- Laurian, a male name and a surname
- August Treboniu Laurian, a Transylvanian Romanian politician, historian and linguist
- A. T. Laurian National College, a public day high school in Botoșani, Romania
