= Morente =

Morente is a Spanish surname. Notable people with the surname include:

- Enrique Morente (1942–2010), Spanish singer
- Estrella Morente (born 1980), Spanish singer, daughter of Enrique
- Tete Morente (born 1996), Spanish footballer

== See also ==
- Lorente
