= Laurent (name) =

- Gender: Male
- Language: French

Origin
- Meaning: "From Laurentum", "Laurelled" or "bright, shining one"
- Region of origin: France

Other names
- Related names: Laurence (feminine), Lorenzo (Spanish, Italian), Laurențiu (Romanian), Lourenço (Portuguese)

Laurent is a French masculine given name of Latin origin. It is used in France, Canada, and other French-speaking countries. The name was derived from the Roman surname Laurentius, which meant "from Laurentum". Laurentum was an ancient Roman city of Latium situated between Ostia and Lavinium, on the west coast of the Italian peninsula southwest of Rome, and its name is either descended from many groves of Laurus nobilis (bay tree), or, according to Virgil, a single "sacred" laurel tree. The feminine form of Laurent is Laurence.

== Politics ==
- Charles François Laurent (1856–1939), French senior public official and diplomat
- Claude de Roux de Saint-Laurent (died 1689), French soldier, governor of Saint Christophe
- Laurent Durocher (1788–1861), member of the Michigan Senate and House of Representatives
- Louis St. Laurent (1882–1973), twelfth Prime Minister of Canada
- Jean-Luc Laurent (born 1957), French politician
- Jeanne St. Laurent (1886–1966), wife of Louis St. Laurent
- Laurent Alexandre (born 1972), French politician
- Laurent Castillo (born 1962), French politician
- Laurent-Désiré Kabila (1939–2001), President of the Democratic Republic of the Congo from 1997 to 2001
- Laurent Gbagbo (born 1945), President of Côte d'Ivoire from 2000 to 2011
- Laurent Mazaury (born 1965), French politician
- Laurent Grandguillaume (born 1978), member of the French Parliament from 2012 to 2017
- Laurent Lamothe (born 1972), Haiti Foreign Minister & Haiti Prime Minister 2011-2012

== Mathematics ==
- Laurent Schwartz, French mathematician
- Paul Matthieu Hermann Laurent, French mathematician
- Pierre Alphonse Laurent, French mathematician best known as the discoverer of the Laurent series

== Science ==
- Auguste Laurent (1807–1853), French chemist
- Christian Laurent, French engineer
- Joseph Jean Pierre Laurent, a French astronomer
- Laurent Lantieri, French plastic surgeon who is a pioneer in the field of face transplantation
- Raymond Laurent, Belgian herpetologist

== Sports ==
- Emelyne Laurent (born 1998), French footballer
- Laurent Blanc, French association football manager
- Laurent Capet, French volleyball player
- Laurent Chambertin, French volleyball player
- Laurent Delahaye, French racing driver
- Laurent Desbiens, French cyclist
- Laurent Duvernay-Tardif (born 1991), Canadian player of American football with the Kansas City Chiefs
- Laurent Fignon (1960–2010), French cyclist
- Laurent Koscielny, French association football player
- Laurent Manuel, American association football (soccer) player
- Laurent Robinson, American football wide receiver for the Dallas Cowboys
- Lucien Laurent, French association football player
- Roger Laurent, Belgian racing driver
- Laurent Pimond, French association football player
- Laurent Seigne, French former rugby union coach

== Others ==
- Laurent, Prince of Belgium, 12th in line to the Belgian throne
- Laurent Bourgeois, choreographer and rapper from French dance duo Les Twins
- Laurent Brancowitz, guitarist for French band Phoenix
- Laurent Heynemann (born 1948), French Jewish film director, screenwriter
- Laurent Laplante (1934–2017), Canadian journalist, essayist and detective writer
- Laurent Mauvignier (born 1967), French writer
- Laurent Nkunda, Congolese rebel general
- Harry Laurent (1895–1987), New Zealand recipient of the Victoria Cross
- Joseph Laurent (1839–1917), Abenaki chief and linguist
- Mathilde Laurent, French perfumer
- Mélanie Laurent, French actress
- Yves Saint Laurent (designer), French fashion designer

== Fictional characters ==
- Dick Laurent, a fictional character in Lost Highway by David Lynch
- Laurent (Twilight), one of the nomadic vampires in Stephenie Meyer's Twilight series
- Laurent (Captive Prince), prince of Vere in C. S. Pacat's Captive Prince series
- Laurent (Fire Emblem), one of the Future Shepards from Fire Emblem Awakening

== See also ==
- Laurent (disambiguation)
- Laurence (name), feminine form of "Laurent"
- Lauret (surname), people with this surname
