= Lorance =

Lorance may refer to:

- Clint Lorance, former United States Army officer
- Cheryl Anne Lorance, American sculptor, painter, goldsmith, and intaglio printmaker
- Lorance Township, Bollinger County, Missouri in Missouri, United States

== See also ==
- Lorence
- Loran (disambiguation)
