= Llorente =

- Language: Spanish

Origin
- Language: Aragonese
- Derivation: Latin: Laurentius
- Meaning: 'laurel'

Other names
- Variant form: Lorente
- Related names: Lorenzo (Note: Castilian Spanish)

The Spanish surname Llorente has an Aragonese origin recorded under different forms: Lorien, Lorient (sobrarbesa place names), Lorent or Llorent(forms in medieval Aragonese Ebro Valley). This surname scattered over almost the entire Iberian Peninsula due to the reconquest, Because Castilian became increasingly important, the surnames came to be pronounced with an -e at the end.

== People ==
- Alejandro Llorente y Lannas (1814–1901), Spanish Minister of State and writer
- Diego Llorente, Spanish footballer for Real Betis
- Fernando Llorente, retired Spanish footballer
- Jerónima Llorente (1793-1848), Spanish actress
- José Luis Llorente, basketball player for the National Team of Spain
- Joseba Llorente Etxarri, retired Spanish footballer
- Juan Antonio Llorente (1756–1823), Spanish cleric and historian of the Spanish Inquisition
- Julián Volio Llorente, Costa Rican politician
- Marcos Llorente, Spanish footballer for Atletico Madrid
- Patricio Lorente, Argentine scholar
- Pedro Llorente, Spanish football manager
- Segundo Llorente (1906–1989), Spanish-born Alaskan missionary priest, Alaska State Legislator, and author
- Victoria Llorente, Argentine basketball player

== Places ==
- Llorente, Eastern Samar, Philippines
- Llorente, Colombia
- San Llorente, Spain
