= Cold Morning on the Range =

Painting by Frederic Remington

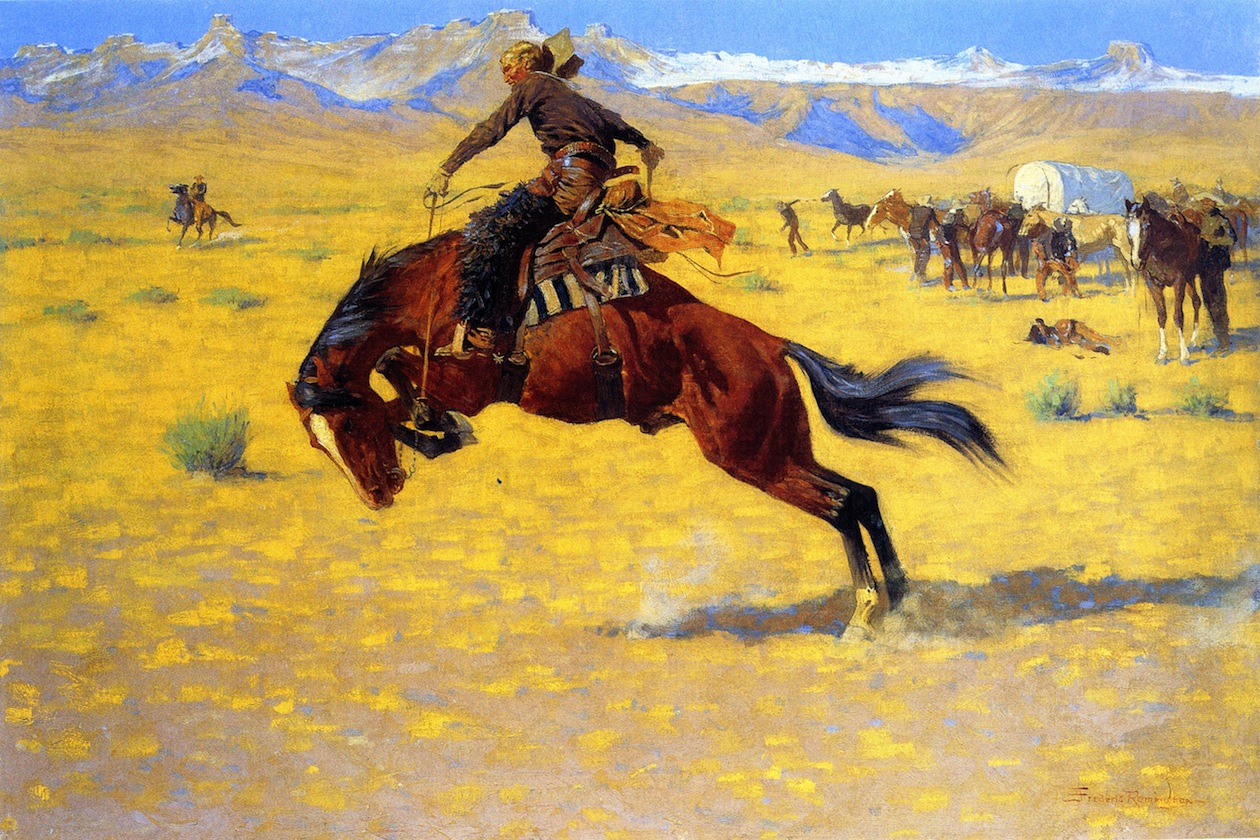
- Artist: Frederic Remington
- Year: 1904
- Medium: Oil on canvas
- Dimensions: 68.9 cm × 101.92 cm (27.13 in × 40.13 in)
- Location: American Museum of Western Art – The Anschutz Collection; Denver

Cold Morning on the Range is an oil-based painting created by American artist Frederic Remington in 1904. The painting depicts a man on the American frontier, riding a bay horse. The horse is bucking, possibly related to the "Cold Morning" in the title, as horses were known to buck or otherwise behave abnormally on cold mornings. In the background are many other men with horses, apparently on a cattle drive. Mountains are also visible in the distance, which perhaps leads the viewer to assume that this is the Goodnight-Loving Trail and the mountains are a range of the Rocky Mountains.

Throughout the painting, the color yellow is dominant to show the arid nature of the land. Remington's intention was to highlight such themes as self-reliance and mastery over nature. This painting measures 69 by 102 cm and currently resides at the American Museum of Western Art in Denver, Colorado.

== Description ==
The man in the front middle of the painting is assumed to be a cowhand. He is wearing the traditional garb of a cowhand, including chaps, cowboy boots, and a canvas shirt. He is not wearing a hat, most likely due to the rowdiness of the horse, and the high probability that the hat fell off. He is sitting on a saddle and gives the impression of a very experienced rider; he clutches the reins with one hand and skillfully counterbalances by placing his other hand in the air. His fellow cowhands appear to be watching him with some concentration, though they are very distant and hard to see.

The horse appears to be a brown bay with a black mane and tail. It is jumping into the air, trying to buck off the unwelcome rider. The horse's front legs are in the air and the muscles in his back legs are bulging. The horse has a white stripe on its face and appears to be full of life and strong. It is obviously a wild horse, trying to break free of captivity, while its rider is trying to calm and eventually tame it.
