= Lorenc =

- Gender: Male

Origin
- Origin: Latin nomen Laurentius
- Region of origin: Italy

Lorenc is a Polish surname and an Albanian given name, from Lorenz in German, derived from the Roman surname Laurentius. Notable people with the name include:

== Surname ==
- Adam Lorenc (born 1998), Polish volleyball player
- Czesław Lorenc (1925–2015), Polish rower
- Jan Lorenc (born 1954), Polish-American designer and writer
- Kito Lorenc (1938–2017), Sorbian writer
- Maciej Lorenc (born 1985), journalist and translator
- Michał Lorenc (born 1955), Polish film score composer
- Richard Lorenc (born 1951), Australian soccer referee
- Ziggy Lorenc (born 1958), Canadian television and radio personality

== Given name ==
- Lorenc Antoni (1909–1991), Kosovo Albanian composer, conductor and ethnomusicologist
- Lorenc Leskaj (born 1968), Albanian footballer
- Lorenc Shehaj (born 1994), Albanian footballer
- Lorenc Trashi (born 1992), Albanian footballer

== See also ==
- Lorenç Mallol, 14th-century Spanish poet
- Lorenz
