= Lorenz =

Lorenz is an originally German name derived from the Roman surname Laurentius, which means "from Laurentum".

== Given name ==
- Prince Lorenz of Belgium (born 1955), member of the Belgian royal family by his marriage with Princess Astrid of Belgium
- Lorenz Böhler (1885–1973), Austrian trauma surgeon
- Lorenz Hart (1895–1943), American lyricist, half of the famed Broadway songwriting team Rodgers and Hart
- Lorenz Lange (1690–1752), Russian official in Siberia
- Lorenz von Numers (1913–1994), Swedish-speaking Finnish journalist, translator and author
- Lorenz Oken (1779–1851), German naturalist
- Lorenz Weinrich (1929–2025), German historian
- Lorenz of Werle (1338/40–1393/94), Lord of Werle-Güstrow

== Surname ==
- Adolf Lorenz (1854–1946), Austrian surgeon
- Alfred Lorenz (1868–1939), Austrian-German musical analyst
- Angela Lorenz (born 1965), American artist
- Barbara Lorenz, make-up artist
- Carl Lorenz (1913–1993), German cyclist
- Christian Lorenz (born 1966), German musician
- Edward Norton Lorenz (1917–2008), American mathematician and meteorologist, founder of chaos theory
- Francis S. Lorenz (1914–2008), American jurist and politician
- Friedrich Lorenz (1897–1944), German Catholic priest
- Hans Lorenz (1865–1940), German engineer and physicist
- Konrad Lorenz (1903–1989), Austrian zoologist, ethologist, and ornithologist
- Kuno Lorenz (born 1932), German philosopher
- Lee Lorenz (1932–2022), American cartoonist
- Ludvig Lorenz (1829–1891), Danish mathematician and physicist
- Marita Lorenz (1939–2019), German woman who had an affair with Fidel Castro and betrayed a CIA assassination attempt against him
- Max Lorenz (footballer) (1939–2025), German footballer
- Max Lorenz (tenor) (1901–1975), German tenor
- Max O. Lorenz (1876–1959), American economist
- Michael Lorenz (footballer) (born 1979), German footballer
- Michael Lorenz (musicologist) (born 1958), Austrian musicologist
- Michael Lorenz (veterinarian), American veterinary scientist
- Ottokar Lorenz (1832–1904), Austrian-German historian and genealogist
- Richard Lorenz (bobsleigh) (1901–1953), Austrian bobsledder
- Richard Lorenz (chemist) (1863–1929), chemist from Vienna
- Richard Lorenz (artist) (1858–1915), German painter
- Siegfried Lorenz (athlete) (born 1933), German hammer thrower
- Siegfried Lorenz (baritone) (1945–2024), German singer
- Siegfried Lorenz (politician) (born 1930), German politician
- Stephen R. Lorenz (born 1951), United States retired Air Force four-star general
- Sylvana Lorenz (1953–2026), French art dealer and author
- Taylor Lorenz, American journalist
- Trey Lorenz (born 1969), American singer
- Ulrike Lorenz (born 1963), German art historian and president of the Klassik Stiftung Weimar
- Werner Lorenz (1891–1974), German SS officer and war criminal
- William Lorenz (1882–1958), American physician, psychiatrist, and U.S. Army medical officer in World War I

== Fictional characters ==
- Lorenz Hellman Gloucester, from the video game Fire Emblem: Three Houses
- Keel Lorenz, an antagonist from the anime Neon Genesis Evangelion
- Lighter Lorenz, from the video game Zenless Zone Zero

== See also ==
- Lorentz, spelled with a "t"
