= Michael Lorenz =

Michael Lorenz may refer to:

- Michael Lorenz (veterinarian)
- Michael Lorenz (footballer)
- Michael Lorenz (musicologist)
