= Laurenson =

Laurenson is a Scottish and English surname Meaning "Son of Laurence". Notable people with the surname include:

- George Laurenson (1857–1913), New Zealand politician
- James Laurenson (born 1940), New Zealand actor
- Tom Laurenson (1906–1969), Australian rules footballer
