= Roșca =

Roșca is a Romanian surname which may refer to:

- Alexandru Roșca (psychologist), Romanian psychologist
- Dumitru D. Roșca, Romanian philosopher
- Iurie Roşca, Moldovan politician
- Laurențiu Țigăeru Roșca, Romanian politician
- Marcel Roşca, Romanian sport shooter
- Mihai Roșca, Moldovan footballer
