= Frank Tenney Johnson =

American artist (1874–1939)

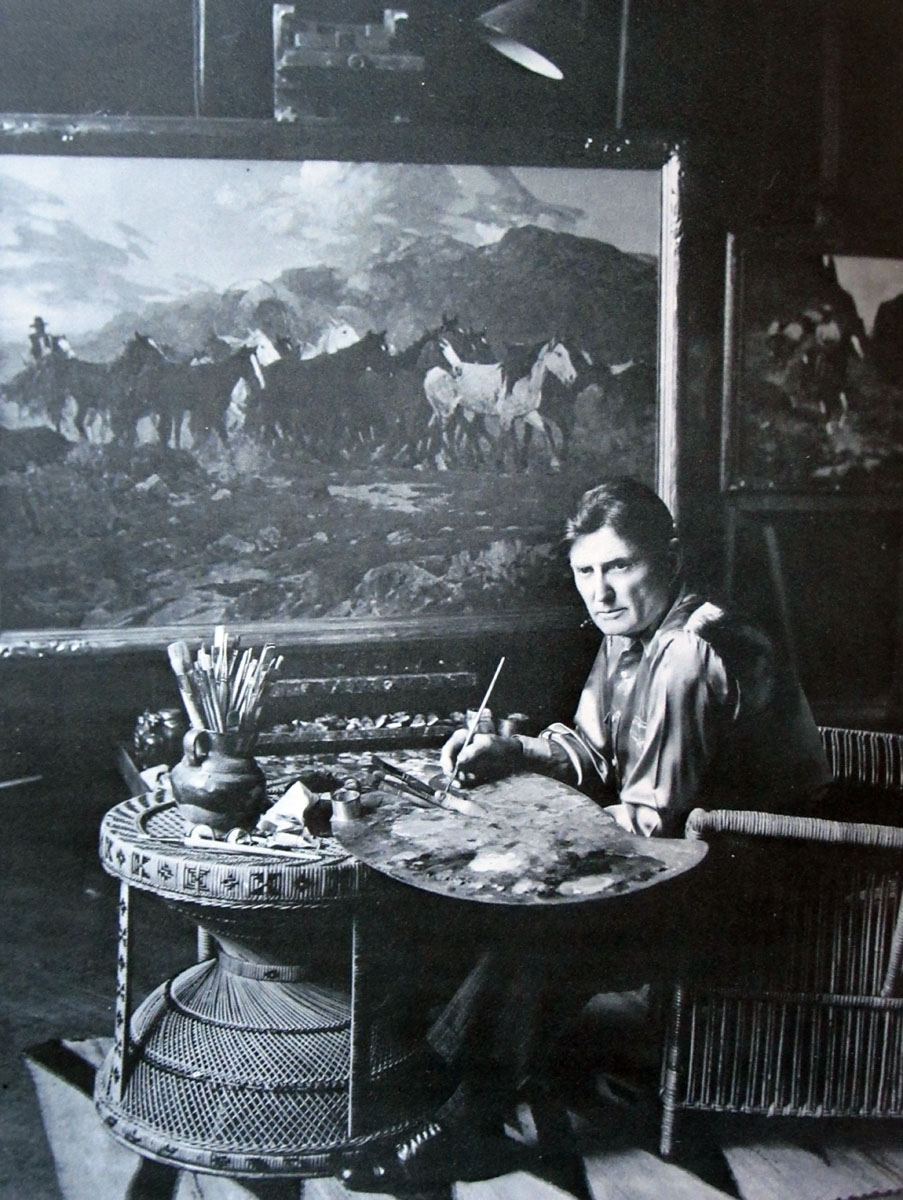
- Image of Frank Tenney Johnson in his studio
- Born: 26 June 1874; Pottawattamie County, Iowa, United States
- Died: 1 January 1939 (aged 64); Pasadena, California, United States
- Resting place: San Gabriel Cemetery, San Gabriel, California, U.S.
- Education: Richard Lorenz, Milwaukee School of Art, John Henry Twachtman, Art Students League of New York
- Known for: Painting, Illustrating
- Notable work: Riders of the Dawn, Somewhere on the Range

Frank Tenney Johnson (June 26, 1874 – January 1, 1939) was a painter of the Old American West, and he popularized a style of painting cowboys which became known as "The Johnson Moonlight Technique". Somewhere on the Range is an example of Johnson's moonlight technique. To paint his paintings he used knives, fingers and brushes.

== Early life ==
Johnson was born in Pottawattamie County, Iowa, to Abner Johnson and Cordelia Rebecca Tenney. He was raised on his family's farm along the old Overland Trail, near Big Grove, Iowa (now known as Oakland, Iowa), in the Council Bluffs area, where his father raised cattle. Johnson's early American ancestors were from England, Ireland, Wales, Denmark and Sweden. His Bascom ancestors were French Basque. Johnson's mother died in December 1886, and the family moved to the Milwaukee, Wisconsin area. He attended Oconomowoc High School in Oconomowoc. In 1893, he enrolled in the Milwaukee School of Art (absorbed by Milwaukee State Normal School in 1913), where he studied with Richard Lorenz, a well-known painter of western subjects. In 1895, Johnson moved to New York City, where he studied with John Henry Twachtman at the Art Students League of New York.

== Career ==
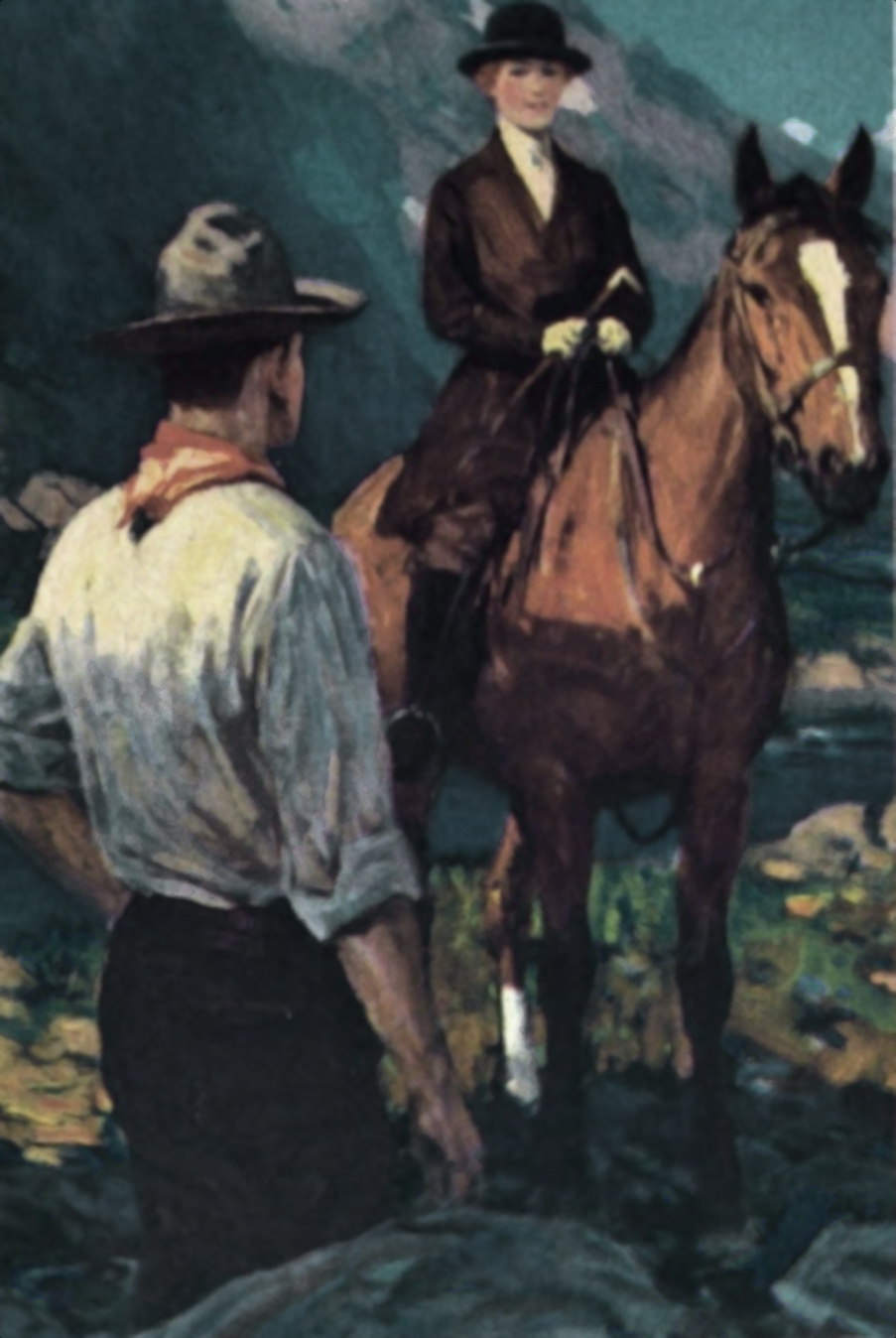
The Joyous Troublemaker, an illustration designed by Johnson.

In his early career, he worked primarily as an illustrator. He began working for Field & Stream magazine in 1904. He also illustrated for Boys' Life magazine. In addition to Field & Stream, he contributed to Cosmopolitan and Harpers Weekly magazines, and illustrated the Western novels of Zane Grey.

Johnson lived permanently in New York City from 1904 until 1920, making numerous trips to the west to gather source material for his works that were completed in his New York studio. In 1912 he joined cowboy artist Charles Russell on a sketching expedition to the Blackfoot Reservation east of Glacier National Park in Montana. He lived and worked on the Lazy 7 Ranch in Hayden, Colorado, for a while, where he gained the title "Cow-Puncher Artist." Later he went southwest to work on painting Native Americans. In 1920, he moved to 22 Champion Place in Alhambra, California where he shared a studio with Clyde Forsythe. At this point Johnson's easel paintings became more popular than his illustrations so he concentrated in this medium. Together Johnson and Forsythe exhibited in the Biltmore Art Gallery started by Jack Wilkinson Smith at the Biltmore Hotel according to Edan Milton Hughes, Artists in California 1786 – 1940.

Between 1931 and 1939, he spent much of his time at his studio in Cody, Wyoming, just outside Yellowstone National Park. Many of his paintings were done there from studies inside the park. He has been called the "Master of American Moonlight Painting" and "Master Painter of the Old West."

Attending a social event with his wife, Johnson happened to greet a socialite with a kiss on the cheek. Unfortunately, he contracted spinal meningitis from her with that kiss. She died a few days later, and then he died from the disease on New Year's Day 1939 in Pasadena, California.

== Awards and honors ==
In 1923, Johnson was awarded the Samuel T. Shaw Purchase Prize at an exhibit at the Salmagundi Club of which he was a member.

In 1932, Johnson was honored with membership in the National Academy of Design.

In 1979, the Frank Tenney Johnson Memorial Invitational Art Show was held at the Gene Autry Hotel in Palm Springs, California.
