= Harry Gestetner =

British-American technology entrepreneur

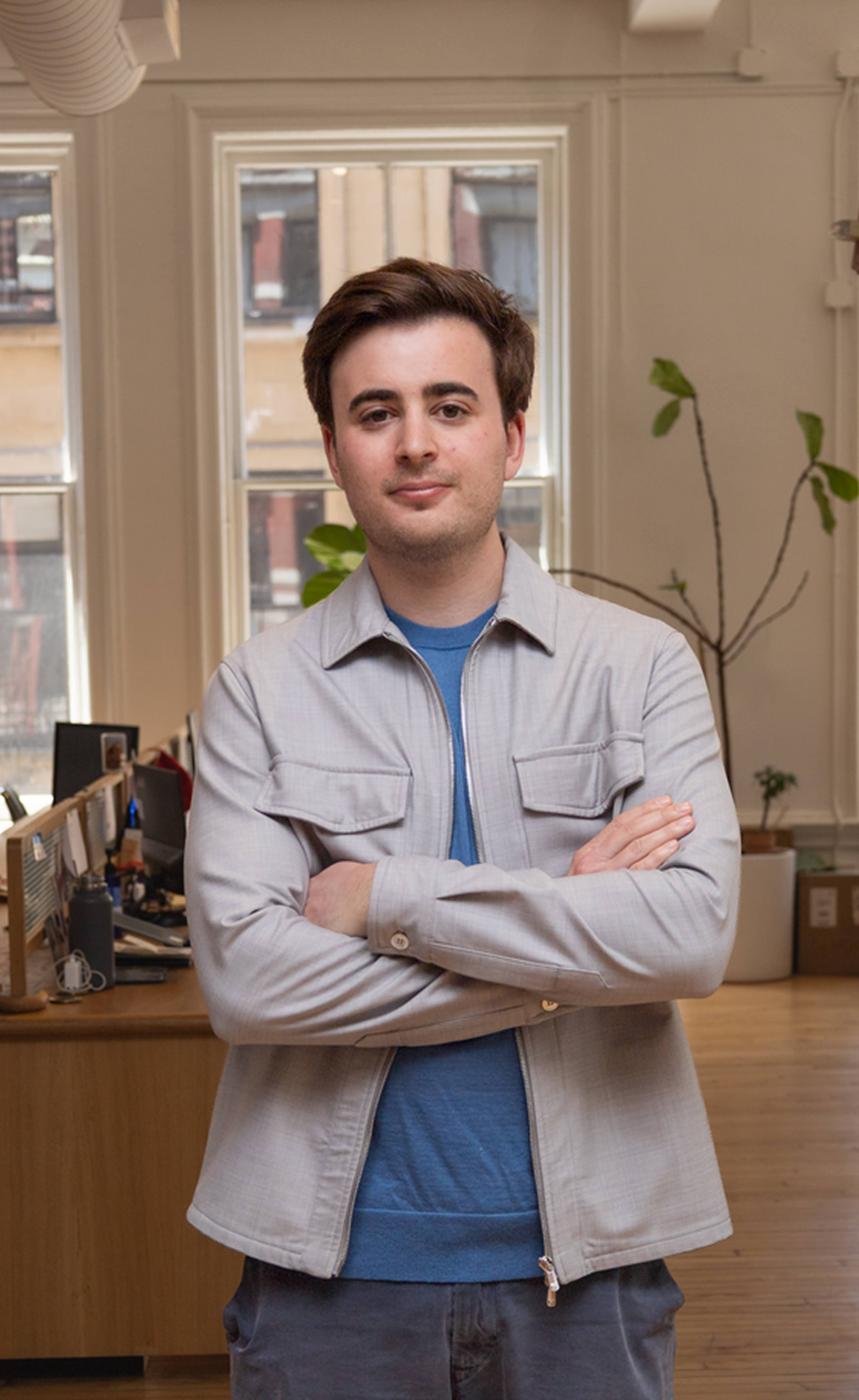
- Born: 27 July 2000 (age 26); United Kingdom
- Education: Tulane University (BSM, 2022)
- Occupation: Technology entrepreneur
- Known for: Co-founder of Fanfix; founder of Orion Sleep
- Relatives: David Gestetner (great-great-grandfather)

Harry Gestetner is a British-American technology entrepreneur and founder of Fanfix and Orion Sleep.

== Biography ==
Gestetner was born in the United Kingdom on 27 July 2000 and grew up in London, England. He relocated to Los Angeles at age 15 and started his first company at age 11. He attended Tulane University, where he studied business and entrepreneurship. While in college, Gestetner founded Fuel Our Heroes, a charity that raised money for healthcare workers at the start of the COVID-19 pandemic.

In 2020, Harry Gestetner and Simon Pompan founded Fanfix, a creator subscription platform aimed at Gen Z influencers and fans, while they were in college. The platform allowed creators to earn revenue by posting exclusive content to paying subscribers. Gestetner sold Fanfix in June 2023 to ecommerce company SuperOrdinary for a reported $65 million. Gestetner and Pompan were included in the Forbes 30 Under 30 list in the social media category that year.

In 2024, Gestetner was named in The Times' "25 Most Inspiring People aged 30 and Under in the UK."

In 2025, Gestetner founded Orion Sleep. The company develops sleep technology products, including an AI-enabled mattress cover designed to regulate temperature during sleep. The technology was being developed with sleep expert Michael Breus. Within 3 months of launch, Orion Sleep surpassed 8-figures in revenue.

== Personal life ==
Gestetner lives in Los Angeles, California. He is the great-great grandson of inventor David Gestetner, who invented the Gestetner duplicator.

Gestetner has said that scaling his first company came at a personal cost, recalling that he was “working like a dog and neglecting every other area of my life,” an experience that later drove his focus on sleep, performance and recovery with the founding of Orion Sleep.
