= Lovro =

Lovro is a South Slavic masculine given name, equivalent to Laurence or Lawrence (derived from the Latin Laurentius). It is predominantly used in Croatia and Slovenia.

Notable people with the name include:

- Lovro Artuković (born 1959), Croatian painter and graphic artist who primarily paints large scale figurative canvases
- Lovro Cvek (born 1995), Croatian footballer
- Lovro Dobričević (1420–1478), Croatian painter from Kotor
- Lovro Iločki or Lawrence of Ilok (1459–1524), Croatian nobleman, very wealthy and powerful in the Kingdom of Hungary-Croatia
- Lovro Jotić (born 1994), Croatian handball player
- Lovro Karaula (1800–1875), Croatian friar from Bosnia and Herzegovina
- Lovro Kuhar, pen name Prežihov Voranc, (1893–1950), Slovene writer and Communist political activist
- Lovro Majer (born 1998), Croatian footballer
- Lovro von Matačić (1899–1985), Croatian conductor and composer
- Lovro Mazalin (born 1997), Croatian professional basketball player
- Lovro Medić (born 1990), Croatian professional footballer
- Lovro Mihačević (1856–1920), Croatian Catholic priest, author, albanologist and epic poet from Bosnia and Herzegovina
- Lovro Mihić (born 1994), handball player
- Lovro Monti (1835–1898), Dalmatian politician of Italian descent
- Lovro Radonić (1928–1990), Croatian water polo player and butterfly swimmer who competed in the Olympic Games
- Lovro Šćrbec (born 1990), Croatian international junior football forward
- Lovro Šturm (1938–2021), Slovenian jurist and politician
- Lovro Toman (1827–1870), Slovene Romantic nationalist revolutionary activist during the Revolution of 1848
- Lovro Zovko (born 1981), professional Croatian tennis player

== See also ==
- Lovro and Lilly Matačić Foundation, founded in 1987 to improve the skill of gifted young conductors, in Croatia and abroad
- International Competition of Young Conductors Lovro von Matačić, organized by the Lovro and Lilly Matačić Foundation every 4 years in Zagreb, Croatia
- Lovrović
- Lovero
