= Burial on the Plains =

Richard Lorenz painting

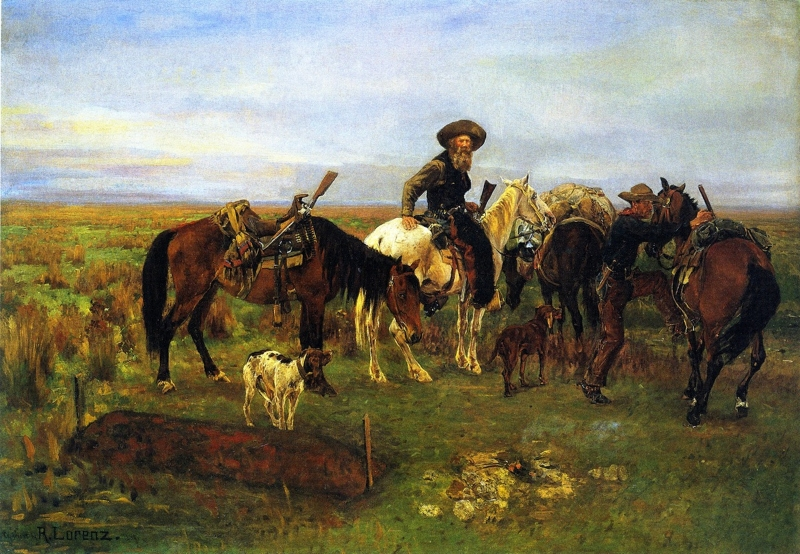
Burial on the Plains by Richard Lorenz, c. 1890

Burial on the Plains (c. 1890) is a painting by Richard Lorenz. The painting was exhibited in Munich in 1891 and it is part of the collection at the American Museum of Western Art – The Anschutz Collection. It is in the genre of Western American Art.

== Background ==
In 1909 Richard Lorenz became the preeminent artist painting in the Western genre. Lorenz was a horse specialist and he began his career working on large canvas panoramas. The painting is focussed on a grave and two cowboys. Joan Carpenter Troccoli who wrote the book Painters and the American West: The Anschutz Collection describes the painting by saying, it is easy to imaging Burial on the Plains being a segment of a panorama "open-ended and abruptly cut off".

== History ==
In 1891 the painting was exhibited at the International exhibition in Munich. In 1915 the Boston Evening Transcript reported that it received great praise in Munich. It was scheduled to be exhibited at the World's Columbian Exposition but it was "lost in transmission" and not recovered in time. By 1915 the painting was originally owned by Mrs. Shandein. The painting is now housed at the American Museum of Western Art – The Anschutz Collection.
