= Lorun (disambiguation) =

Lorun is a village in Ardabil province, Iran.

Lorun may also refer to:

- Lorüns, a municipality in Vorarlberg, Austria
- LORUN (LOFAR at Radboud University Nijmegen), a radio telescope in the Netherlands

== See also ==
- Loran (disambiguation)
