= Llorenç =

Llorenç is the Catalan version of the male given name Laurentius. It may refer to:

People

- Joan Llorenç (1458–1520), the leader of a germania (guild, literally "brotherhood") of Valencia
- Llorenç Gómez (born 1991), Spanish beach soccer player
- Llorenç Vidal Vidal, Majorcan poet, educator and pacifist who founded the School Day of Non-violence and Peace (DENIP) in 1964

Places named after Saint Lawrence

- Sant Llorenç d'Hortons, municipality in the comarca of Alt Penedès, Barcelona, Catalonia, Spain
- Sant Llorenç de la Muga, town in the Alt Empordà comarca, in Girona province, Catalonia, Spain
- Sant Llorenç de Morunys, municipality in the comarca of the Solsonès in Catalonia, Spain
- Sant Llorenç del Munt, largely rocky mountain massif in central Catalonia, Spain
- Sant Llorenç des Cardassar, small municipality on Majorca, one of the Balearic Islands, Spain
- Sant Llorenç Savall, municipality of the shire of Vallès Occidental
- Church of Sant Llorenç, Lleida, Romanesque church in Lleida (Catalonia, Spain) dating from the late 12th century
