= Laureano =

- Gender: Male

Origin
- Word/name: Various, from Latin
- Meaning: Various, "laurel wreath", "laurel crowned", "laurel tree"

Laureano is a male name and a surname, both deriving from Latin: Laurentius, meaning "laurelled". Alternate spelling include Laurean (Romania, Spain, Italy, Portugal, Puerto Rico, Brazil, France, Mexico, Yugoslavia) and Laurian (Romania, Italy, France).

== People ==
=== Given names ===
- Laureano Albán (1942–2022), Costa Rican writer
- Laureano Barrau, a Spanish impressionist painter
- Laureano Camacho (1917–1976), Mexican professional baseball player
- Laureano Fuentes, wrote the first opera to be composed in Cuba, La hija de Jéfe (the Chief's daughter)
- Laureano Gómez, the President of Colombia from 1950 to 1953
- Laureano Leone (born 1928), a former politician in Ontario, Canada
- Laureano López Rodó (1920–2000), Spanish lawyer and politician
- Laureano Olivares, a Venezuelan film and television actor best known for his role in Elia Schneider's movie Sicario at the age of 16
- Laureano Pineda, the 26th and 29th President (then called Supreme Director) of Nicaragua from 5 May to 11 August 1851, as dissident from 4 August, and from 11 November 1851 to 1 April 1853
- Laureano Ramírez, a retired Dominican boxer, who represented his native country at the 1984 Summer Olympics in Los Angeles in the Men's Flyweight division
- Laurean Rugambwa, was the first modern African Cardinal of the Roman Catholic Church
- Laureano Sanabria Ruiz, a.k.a. Laure, is a Spanish professional footballer who currently plays for Deportivo de La Coruña, mainly as a right back
- Laureano Tombolini, an unattached Argentine football goalkeeper who plays for Instituto
- Laureano de Torres y Ayala, colonial governor of Cuba and Spanish Florida
- Laureano Vallenilla Lanz, a Venezuelan intellectual and sociologist
- August Treboniu Laurian, a Transylvanian Romanian politician, historian and linguist

=== Surnames ===
- Gustavo Laureano, a Puerto Rican guitarist and composer, better known for being the lead singer of the band La Secta AllStar
- José Laureano, a Puerto Rican professional boxer
- Manny Laureano, the Principal Trumpet of the Minnesota Orchestra, as well as the Co-Artistic Director of the Minnesota Youth Symphonies
- Marta Laureano, most notable for her involvement in a controversially ruled child custody battle
- Napoleão Laureano, a Brazilian cancer specialist
- Ramón Laureano, a Dominican professional baseball outfielder for the San Diego Padres
- Ricky Laureano, a Puerto Rican musician most known for being the guitarist and one of the main songwriters of the Rock en Español band Fiel a la Vega
- Tony Laureano, an extreme metal drummer, originally from Puerto Rico

== See also ==
- Laura (disambiguation)
- Lauren (disambiguation)
- Lauriano, a comune in the Province of Turin
- Lawrence of Rome
