= Loren Piretra =

American marketing executive, political commentator, and social media personality

- Occupations: Marketing executive; Podcaster; Political commentator; TikToker
- Political party: Democratic

Instagram information
- Page: Loren Piretra
- Genre: Politics
- Followers: 409 K

TikTok information
- Page: iamlorenp
- Followers: 271.9 K
- Last updated: November 6, 2026
- Website: www.lorenpiretra.com

Loren Piretra (born July 6, 1989) is an American marketing executive, podcaster, social media personality, and political commentator. She was vice president of Playboy's subscription-based social platform and in 2023 she became chief marketing officer for Fanfix.

== Early life and education ==
Piretra was born to Laurence and Judy Piretra. She received a certification in diversity, equity, and inclusion from Cornell University and studied trauma support at the Arizona Trauma Institute.

== Career ==
Piretra was hired as the global head of creator and influencer marketing at Twitch in 2020. She co-founded Twitch Women's Alliance, an employee group dedicated to increase representation of women, nonbinary people, and marginalized genders on the platform and to promote user safety and inclusivity. She had previously worked with Red Bull and the National Football League.

In 2022, she was hired by Playboy as vice president and co-lead of the PLBY Group's subscription-based social centerfold platform.

In 2023, Piretra was hired by Fanfix as their first-ever chief marketing officer. In 2025, she became the chief marketing and creator officer for the direct-to-fan platform Passes.

She founded the political podcast The Loren Piretra Show.
