= Laurynas =

Laurynas is a Lithuanian masculine given name and may refer to:

- Laurynas Beliauskas (born 1997), Lithuanian basketball player
- Laurynas Birutis (born 1997), Lithuanian basketball player
- Laurynas Gucevičius (1753–1798), Polish-Lithuanian architect
- Laurynas Grigelis (born 1991), Lithuanian tennis player
- Laurynas Mikalauskas (born 1985), Lithuanian basketball player
- Laurynas Samėnas (born 1988), Lithuanian basketball player
- Laurynas Stankevičius (born 1935), Lithuanian politician; Prime Minister of Lithuania
- Laurynas Ivinskis (1810–1881), Lithuanian publisher, translator, teacher, and lexicographer
- Laurynas Rimavičius (born 1985), Lithuanian football defender
