= Labhrás =

Labhrás is an Irish given name derived from the Roman surname, Laurentius. Notable people with the name include:

- Labhrás Ó Murchú (born 1939), Director-General of Comhaltas Ceoltóirí Éireann
- Labhrás Mag Fhionnail (baptized 1852–1923), Irish lawyer and statesman

== See also ==
- List of Irish-language given names
