= Loren =

Loren is a given name, nickname and surname which may refer to:

== Given name ==
=== Men ===
- Loren Acton (born 1936), American physicist and astronaut
- Loren C. Ball (born 1948), amateur astronomer who has discovered more than 100 asteroids
- Loren M. Berry (1888–1980), American businessman
- Loren Bouchard (born 1970), American television writer and director
- Loren Brichter (born 1984), American software developer
- Loren Cameron (1959–2022), American photographer
- Loren Carpenter (1947–2025), American computer graphics researcher and developer
- Loren Coleman (born 1947), American scientist and author
- Loren L. Coleman (born 1947), American science-fiction writer
- Loren W. Collins (1838–1912), American jurist and politician
- Loren Mazzacane Connors (born 1949), American musician
- Loren Crabtree (born 1940), American academic and chancellor
- Loren Cunningham (1935–2023), American missionary organizer
- Loren Dean (born 1969), American actor
- Loren C. Dunn (1930–2001), American general authority of the LDS Church
- Loren Eiseley (1907–1977), American scientist and writer
- Loren D. Estleman (born 1952), American author
- Loren D. Everton (1915–1991), American Marine flying ace, Navy Cross recipient
- Loren Graham (1933–2024), American historian of science
- Loren Leman (born 1950), American politician
- Loren Long (born 1964), American author of children's books
- Loren McIntyre (1917–2003), American photojournalist, worked extensively in South America
- Loren Meyer (born 1972), American professional basketball player
- Loren Miller (activist), American civic reformer and libertarian activist
- Loren Miller (judge) (1903–1967), American California Superior Court judge
- Loren Mosher (1933–2004), American psychiatrist
- Loren Murchison (1898–1979), American athlete
- Loren Nerell (born 1960), American composer, ethnomusicologist and gamelan musician
- Loren Pope (1910–2008), American writer
- Loren Roberts (born 1955), American golfer
- Loren Schoenberg (born 1958), American musician and historian
- Loren B. Sessions (1827–1897), New York politician
- Loren Shriver (born 1944), American pilot and astronaut
- Loren A. Smith (born 1944), American federal judge on the United States Court of Federal Claims
- Loren Strickland (born 2000), American football player
- Loren Taylor (born 1977), American politician
- Loren Toews (born 1951), American football player
- Loren H. White (1863–1923), New York politician
- Loren Wiseman (1951–2017), American board game designer and developer
- Loren Wright (1917–2005), American professional basketball player

=== Women ===
- Loren Allred, an American singer
- Loren Gabel (born 1997), Canadian ice hockey player
- Loren Galler-Rabinowitz (born 1986), American ice dancer
- Loren Gray (born 2002), American singer and social media personality
- Loren Horsley (born 1977), New Zealand actress
- Loren Kruger (born 1958), South African academic
- Loren Piretra, American marketing executive and social media content creator
- Loren Rowney (born 1988), Australian racing cyclist

== Nickname ==
- Loren Legarda (born 1960), Filipina journalist and politician
- Loren Morón (footballer, born 1993), Spanish footballer
- Lorenzo Juarros García (born 1966), Spanish retired footballer
- Loren Morón (footballer, born 1970), Spanish footballer and manager
- Loren Sánchez (born 2003), Spanish footballer
- Loren (born 1995), South Korean musician

== Surname ==
- Bryan Loren (1966–2026), American singer-songwriter and record producer
- Donna Loren (born 1947), American actress
- Eric Loren, American actor
- Giselle Loren, American voice actor
- Josie Loren (born 1987), American actress
- Nanda Loren (born 1988), Brazilian singer
- Sophia Loren (born 1934), Italian actress
- Todd Loren (1960–1992), American comic book publisher

== Fictional characters ==
- Loren McWilliams, the male protagonist of the 1985 film The New Kids
- Loren Silvercloak, in the Fionavar Tapestry novels by Guy Gavriel Kay
- Lt. Loren Singer, a main character in the TV series JAG
- Loren Smith (character), in the Dirk Pitt novels by Clive Cussler
- Loren, in the Animorphs novel series (appearing in The Andalite Chronicles and The Diversion)
- Frederick Loren, a character in the film House on Haunted Hill.

== See also ==
- Lauren (disambiguation)
- Loran (disambiguation)
- Lorens (given name)
- Lorenz
- Lorne (disambiguation)
