= Lorie =

Lorie is a feminine name. It may refer to:

== People ==
Given name

- Lorie (singer) (full name Laure Pester) (born 1982), French singer
- Lorie Conway, American independent producer and filmmaker
- Lorie Griffin, American film and television actress
- Lorie Kane (born 1964), Canadian professional golfer
- Lorie Line (born 1958), American New Age pianist, composer, and performer
- Lorie O'Clare, American author of erotic romance, romantic suspense and paranormal romance novels
- Lorie Skjerven Gildea (born 1961), American attorney and Chief Justice
- Lorie Tarshis (1911–1993), Canadian economist

Middle name

- Jill Lorie Hurst, American television soap opera writer and producer

== Film and television ==
- Lorie (film), a 1984 Indian film directed by Vijay Talwar, starring Shabana Azmi and Farooq Shaikh
- Lorie Brooks, a fictional character in The Young and the Restless

== Other uses ==
- Lories and lorikeets, arboreal parrots indigenous to Australasia
