= Laurence =

- Gender: Masculine (English); Feminine (French)
- Language: English (masculine); French (feminine)

Origin
- Meaning: "man from Laurentum" or "bright one, shining one"

Other names
- Cognate: see list

Laurence is in modern use as an English masculine and a French feminine given name. The modern English masculine name is a variant of Lawrence and originates from a French form of the Latin Laurentius, a name meaning "man from Laurentum".

The French feminine name Laurence is derived from the same source and is used in French-speaking countries as a form of the masculine Laurent. The name was used in the Middle Ages for both males and females in honor of Saint Laurence, one of the seven deacons of Rome. In England, it was also given in reference to Saint Laurence of Canterbury.

In other languages: Lorenzo (Italian, Spanish), Lorenz (German). In Ireland, Laurence has traditionally been used as an Anglicization of the Irish masculine name Lorcan or Lorcán.

== Usage ==
Laurence, used as a spelling variant of the more popular Lawrence, was in regular use for boys in the Anglosphere since the medieval era. It was most popular for boys in English-speaking countries during the late 19th century and during the first half of the 20th century.

As a feminine name, Laurence was at the height of popularity in France between 1965 and 1971, when it was among the top 10 names for French girls. It was among the top 100 names for French girls between 1953 and 1984. In French-speaking Quebec, Canada, Laurence has been among the top 100 names for French Canadian girls between 1984 and 2023, and was among the top 10 names for girls between 2002 and 2005 and again in 2008. The name has been in rare, occasional use for girls in English-speaking countries, where Laurence remains a primarily masculine name. Twelve American newborn girls were given the name Laurence in 1961, the year that 16-year-old American Olympic figure skater Laurence Owen died with the entire United States figure skating team in the crash of Sabena Flight 548 in Belgium. No more than four newborn American girls were named Laurence in either 1960 or 1962. Laurence Owen was named in honor of her Canadian paternal grandmother.

== Given name ==
=== Men ===
- Laurence of Canterbury, the second Archbishop of Canterbury
- Laurence Burt (1925–2015), British sculptor and educator
- Laurence Neil Creme, known professionally as Lol Creme, British musician
- Laurence L. Doggett (1864–1957), president of International YMCA College (modern Springfield College)
- Laurence Ilsley Duncan (1906–1982), justice of the New Hampshire Supreme Court
- Laurence Ekperigin (born 1988), British-American basketball player in the Israeli National League
- Laurence Fishburne (born 1961), American actor
- Laurence Fox (born 1978), British actor
- Laurence S. Geller, British-born, US-based real estate investor
- Laurence Ginnell, Irish politician
- Laurence Godfrey (archer), British athlete
- Laurence Godfrey (physics lecturer), regular and controversial contributor to the Usenet newsgroups 'soc.culture.British' and 'soc.culture.Canada'
- Laurence Golborne, Chilean mining and energy minister
- Laurence Harvey, Lithuanian-born actor
- Laurence Hussey, English lawyer and diplomat
- Laurence Keitt (1824–1864), Confederate general
- Laurence Lafore (1917–1985), American historian and novelist
- Laurence "Laurie" Lee (1914–1997), British poet and novelist
- Laurence Llewelyn-Bowen, British television presenter and designer
- Laurence McKeown, Provisional Irish Republican Army member
- Laurence Myers (1858–99), American world-record-setting runner
- Laurence Olivier (1907–1989), British actor and director
- Laurence Pearl (born 1956), British scientist
- Laurence Rappaport (1940–2020), American politician
- Laurence "Larry" Rickard (born 1975), British actor, writer and comedian; one half of the duo 'Larry & George' and one sixth of the comedy troupe Them There
- Laurence J. Rittenband (1905–1993), American judge
- Laurence Sullivan, British writer
- Laurence Andrew Tolhurst, known professionally as Lol Tolhurst, British musician
- Laurence Tribe, American professor of constitutional law
- Laurence Tureaud (born 1952), known professionally as Mr. T, American actor and wrestler
- St Laurence O'Toole, or Lorcán Ua Tuathail, Irish Roman Catholic Saint
- Laurence Wachowski (born 1965), known as Lana Wachowski since the 2000s, American film director

=== Women ===
- Laurence Broze (born 1960), Belgian applied mathematician, statistician, and economist
- Laurence des Cars (born 1966), French curator and art historian
- Laurence Equilbey (born 1962), French conductor
- Laurence Fournier Beaudry (born 1992), Canadian ice dancer
- Laurence Gayte (born 1965), French politician
- Laurence Leboeuf (born 1985), Canadian actress
- Laurence Ndong (born 1971), Gabonese politician
- Laurence Owen (1944–1961), American Olympic figure skater
- Laurence Rochat (born 1979), Swiss cross-country skier who has competed since 1996
- Laurence Sailliet (born 1973), French politician
- Laurence Tubiana (born 1951), French Ambassador responsible for COP21
- Laurence Vichnievsky (born 1955), French politician and magistrate

== Surname ==
- Ashley Laurence (born 1966), American actress and visual artist
- Christopher Laurence (1929–2025), British Anglican priest
- Duncan Laurence (born 1994), Dutch singer, representing Netherlands in Eurovision Song Contest 2019
- Elizabeth Laurence (born 1949), English classical mezzo-soprano singer
- Frederic Laurence (1896–1982), British air ace
- Frederick Laurence (1884–1942), British composer and orchestral manager
- French Laurence (1757–1809), English lawyer and politician, brother of Richard
- Henry Laurence, multiple people
- Jacqueline Laurence (1932–2024), French-born Brazilian actress and theatre director
- John Zachariah Laurence (1829–70), English ophthalmologist
- Margaret Laurence (1926–1987), Canadian novelist and short story writer
- Oona Laurence (born 2002), American actress
- Peter Laurence (sport shooter) (born 1931), Kenyan sports shooter
- Richard Laurence (1760–1838), English Hebraist and Anglican churchman, brother of French
- Samuel Laurence (1812–84), British portrait painter
- Stephen Laurence (born before 1998), American philosopher
- Timothy Laurence (born 1955) retired British Royal Navy officer and second husband of Anne, Princess Royal
- William L. Laurence (1888–1977), Lithuanian-American science journalist for The New York Times (1930–64)

== See also ==
- Larry (disambiguation)
- Lars
- Laurent (disambiguation)
- Laurentius (disambiguation)
- Laura and Lauren, feminine derivatives
- Laurance (name)
- Laurenson
