= Fanfix =

Content monetization platform

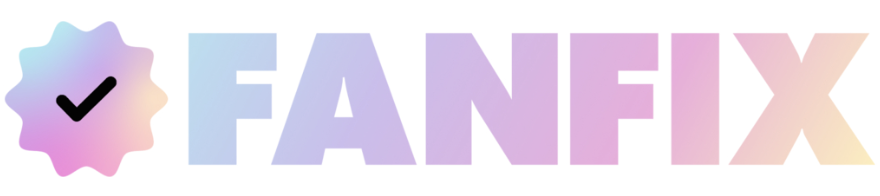
- Website type: Gen-Z creator monetization platform
- Available in: English, Arabic, Spanish
- Headquarters: Los Angeles, California, U.S.
- Founders: Harry Gestetner, Simon Pompan, Tanner Kesel, Cameron Dallas
- Industry: software
- Revenue: $175 million (as of March 2025)
- Website: www.fanfix.io
- Registration: Required
- Users: 63 million+ (as of June 2026)
- Launched: 2020; 6 years ago
- Current status: Active

Fanfix is a California-based social media marketing platform that hosts a subscription business model for content creators.

== History and operations ==
Fanfix was founded in December 2020 by college students Harry Gestetner, Simon Pompan and was later joined by Cameron Dallas as cofounder. Initial funding was provided by the venture capital firm Antler. Fanfix allows creators to place posts, videos and messages behind a paywall. Creators set monthly subscription prices, and the platform also offers paid direct messaging features.

Digital Trends describes Fanfix as a rival to Patreon. Fanfix users pay a subscription fee to the platform to access blog posts, videos, and message-boards made by content creators. As of 2023, the platform keeps 20% of subscription fees, with the remainder going to creators, which is higher than Patreon's 5%-12% share. The platform does not allow nudity. As of November 2022, the site had 9.6 million users.

In July 2022 Fanfix was acquired by SuperOrdinary, a Los Angeles, California–based brand platform. In November 2022, it launched SuperLink, a link-in-bio service intended to compete with Linktree. Fanfix launched in the Middle East in March 2023.

In August 2025, Fanfix acquired Sunroom, a women-focused creator monetization platform. Sunroom was merged into Fanfix. In August 2026, FanFix hired entertainment executive Connor McCrory as president to lead business development and celebrity partnerships.
