= Lauret (surname) =

Lauret is a French surname. Notable people with the surname include:

- Edmond Lauret (1949–2025), French politician
- Jennifer Lauret (born 1980), French actress
- Laryssa Lauret (1939–2015), American actress of Ukrainian descent
- Luis Lauret (born 1997), Cuban-born Romanian weightlifter
- Mélodie Lauret (born 1999), French singer-songwriter and actor
- Mickaël Lauret (born 1977), French football player
- Thierry Lauret (born 1965), French sprinter
- Wenceslas Lauret (born 1989), French rugby union player

== See also ==
- Léon Lauret, pen name of Léoville L'Homme (1857–1928), Mauritian poet, writer, and journalist
