= Laurence Burt =

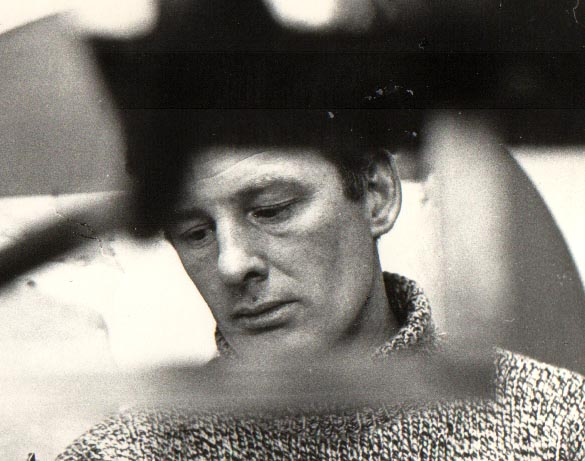
- Burt in 1966
- Born: March 12, 1925; Leeds, England
- Died: April 26, 2015 (aged 90); York, England
- Known for: Sculpture, art education

Laurence Burt (12 March 1925 – 26 April 2015) was a British sculptor and educator who taught at various art colleges across the UK from the late 1950s. Trained as an industrial metalworker, his skills and knowledge of materials strongly influenced his art and teaching practice.

== Early life and education ==
Burt was born in Leeds, Yorkshire and at a young age served in the British Army during World War II. He went on to work as an industrial metalworker in Leeds before transitioning to the arts after taking evening classes at Leeds College of Art, where he later became a lecturer.

== Career ==
Burt joined Leicester College of Art in 1960 under the leadership of Tom Hudson (art educator), later becoming associated with the Leicester Group. In 1964, Burt moved to Cardiff College of Art as a principal lecturer in sculpture, once again working alongside Tom Hudson during the creation of the institution’s Diploma in Art and Design (DipAD) curriculum.

In the early 1970s, Burt relocated to Cyprus, where he established the Pisces art gallery in Famagusta. Following political unrest in 1974, he returned to England and taught at Falmouth College of Art for a period before settling in York.

Throughout his teaching career, Burt continued to exhibit in various group and solo exhibitions including at Drian Galleries (London), the Angela Flowers Gallery, (London) the Argo Gallery, Athens and the Henry Moore Institute (Leeds).

== Work and Style ==
Burt’s sculptures frequently employed metal (hammered sheet & cast), wood, canvas, resin and found objects. Notable works include Helmet I (1962), held in the Tate collection, Machine A.D. '65 and The Piscean (1973), now at the Makarios Cultural Foundation in Nicosia, Cyprus.
