= José Alfredo Lorente =

Puerto Rican musician (born 1994)

José Alfredo Lorente Castillo

Background information
- Born: José Alfredo Lorente Castillo; January 27, 1994 (age 32); Mayagüez, Puerto Rico
- Genres: Rock, Pop, Latin, Latin pop
- Occupations: Singer, songwriter
- Instruments: Vocals, piano
- Years active: 2008–present

José Alfredo Lorente Castillo (born January 27, 1994, in Mayagüez, Puerto Rico), better known as "José Alfredo", is a Puerto Rican singer and songwriter. Today his popularity has been increasing in Puerto Rico, Spain, Argentina, México, Venezuela and Brazil. He has become a singer of promise for the country's artistic class.

== Life and music career ==
José Alfredo Castillo Lorente was born on January 27, 1994, in Mayaguez, Puerto Rico, although most of his growth has lived in San Germán, Puerto Rico with his parents José Lorente Plaza and Cesian Castillo. Since his childhood José Alfredo has the support of their parents. At the beginning of his studies was part of her school choir, also participated in several singing competitions throughout the island. José Alfredo was a member of the band "Secret Files" and being a participant in this experience defined him as the lead singer he is today. Among his most popular songs are "Mirame Bien", "Como Estas", "Autosuficiente" and "Bumbeo".

=== 2009–2010: Relay for Life: Tour por la vida ===
For several months, Jose Alfredo has offered his talents in a series of concerts for American Cancer Society in the events of "Relay for Life" in Puerto Rico, for patients with cancer and other conditions. This platform can see the quality that identifies a human artist. On Saturday May 8, 2010, Paquito Montaner Stadium in Ponce, Puerto Rico, came singing songs of his own "Fuera de Control" and "Casanova" as part of "Relay for Life Tour."

=== 2010–2011: "¿Cómo Estás?" and "Valiente" ===
After achieving popularity in the concert for Relay for Life Tour throughout Puerto Rico, José Alfredo knew how it feels to hear his voice on the radio to tune in Argentina, Brazil and Spain, three countries whom he sent his first single "¿Cómo Estás?" without expectation of support. In the summer of 2010, "¿Cómo Estás?" came to be in the Top 5 of "Conéctate FM" station in Spain and the Top 20 of "Radio CAN" station in Perú.

"Here in Puerto Rico, I have my fans who have supported me and regional radio stations as well, but I never thought that mass support would be first out of my country. Sometimes I'm even silly to see how the public foreigner is driving my career".

"¿Cómo Estás?" composed by José Alfredo, is a fresh and youthful theme that stands out among the musical genres of Pop / Rock. The single is produced by Alex J. Luciano at VM MUSIC studio in Añasco, Puerto Rico. Jose Alfredo released "Como Estas?" on sale via iTunes on July 14, 2010. Now, José recorded his first studio album. "Valiente", released in CD and digital formats. "Valiente" cataloged as an EP had five songs all written by Jose Alfredo. With the release of "Valiente" Jose Alfredo debuted at No. 20 on Amazon most selling albums. With his second single "Mirame Bien" he charted on billboard and got good positions on local radio stations. On summer of 2012 a strong rumour about a special edition of "Valiente" was circulating all around the press, this alternative version was called "Mas Valiente" but never got a release date. By the end of 2012 Jose Alfredo released a new version of "Caotico" but it didn't have success because of the radical change of style the song had.

=== 2014: "Hay Otros Mundos Pero Estan En Mi Cabeza" ===
After all the popularity Jose Alfredo Got with his past two singles he decided to call it a wrap with his first album and start working on the next one. Jose Alfredo confirmed on his Twitter account that he was working with Siko Ruiz (Producer From Spain) on his next album. The first single from this album was "Autosuficiente" gaining a lot of popularity in Puerto Rico and South America. "Me Enamoré" was the second single of this album and got was released on two versions (pop & Latin). "Hay Otros Mundos Pero Estan En Mi Cabeza" was released May 27, 2014, in physical and digital format and it debuted at No. 14 on the top 50 album sells of the week in Puerto Rico. The album includes a collaboration with the Mexican superstar Martin Ricca named "Hoy Gano Yo". In September of that year José Alfredo released the third single of this album called "Mariposas de Papel". The song debuted at No. 8 in the music charts in Venezuela. In 2015 Jose Alfredo released the last single of this album "Fugitivos", with the winner of the third season of Idol Puerto Rico, Marileyda Hernandez.

=== 2016: "Bumbeo and No Quiero Mas Regalos" ===
Jose Alfredo announced on his social networks that he got signed with the label Planeta Mix Records. Later the announced the release of the single "Bumbeo", that got released on March 30, 2016. On October 7, 2016, Jose Alfredo released a "Greatest hits" album titled "Trayectoria" which features songs from "Valiente" and "Hay Otros Mundos Pero Estan En Mi Cabeza", also the album included new tracks as "Bumbeo" and "Toda La Noche". By the end of November Jose Alfredo announced a collaboration with Fundacion CAP in Puerto Rico to raise money for kids with cancer. Later that year Jose Alfredo released "No Quiero Mas Regalos" as a christmas single in benefit of Fundacion CAP.

=== 2018: "T.R.E.S" ===
Jose Alfredo returned to the music after a two years hiatus of the music industry. He released the single "Dejame Entrar", as the first single of the album "T.R.E.S. "Dejame Entrar" gained a lot of popularity in Guatemala, Honduras and El Salvador, countries that Jose Alfredo visited to promote this record. The second single of "T.R.E.S", "Lobo" was released in June and was followed by the release of the single "Polos Opuestos". "T.R.E.S" is the third studio album of Jose Alfredo and was recorded in Spain and Puerto Rico. Siko Ruiz produced the album and co-wrote some of the tracks with Jose Alfredo.

=== 2019 - 2021: Hierba Mala ===
After a brief recess in the music business after his grandmother died, Jose Alfredo released "Cataclismo" as the first single of his upcoming fourth studio album. With this release the artist has been very active in different LGBTTQI activities. He celebrated the release of this single in the Pride event in San Juan, Puerto Rico; performing "Cataclismo" for the first time and a bunch of other hits of previous albums. In January 2020 Jose Alfredo joined Natalia Lugo and Marileyda to release a charity single in benefit of the Rayito de Esperanza Foundation. The single named "Yo Llegaré" gained a lot of mediatic attention and was supported by a heavy promotion plan. Later on Jose Alfredo announced the release of his new single dedicated to his grandmother "Mimi", "Alguien Cuida De Mi".

In the beginning of 2021 José Alfredo, announced the release of his sophomore album "Hierba Mala", that debuted on the 8th place on the best selling latin albums in Puerto Rico and USA.

In August 2021, José Alfredo opened Cristian Castro's concert at the Coliseo de Puerto Rico José Miguel Agrelot. He performed a 45-minute opening set and later joined Castro for a duet of "Puerto Rico".

=== 2022–2023: En mis manos ===
In January 2022, José Alfredo released "Imperfecto", a single addressing self-acceptance and self-esteem. Produced by Adrik, the song was co-written by José Alfredo, Marileyda Hernández and Valeria Cid.

In May 2023, he released En mis manos, an eight-track album combining urban music and ballads. Its lyrics address subjects including sexuality, self-acceptance and eating disorders. The album includes "A-MARTE", "Rojo" and "Tu canción", a collaboration with the Puerto Rican band Las Cejas de Frida.

=== 2024: Collaborations and new singles ===
In March 2024, José Alfredo collaborated with singer-songwriter Samara on "En sus marcas, listos, fuera". The song was written by the two performers with Valeria Cid and produced by Adrik and Carlos Cruz.

Later that year, he released "Por mi camino", his first exploration of regional Mexican music. Its music video was directed by José Alfredo and filmed in Lajas, Puerto Rico.

In October, he released a rock interpretation of "Cómo te va mi amor", written by Hernaldo Zúñiga and popularized by Pandora. His other releases that year included "Mariposa", dedicated to his mother, and "Hecatombe".

=== 2025: Mercurio retrógrado ===
On May 22, 2025, José Alfredo released Mercurio retrógrado, a concept album exploring grief, emotional recovery and resilience following the end of a relationship. Produced by Jesús Jara and Adrik, the album incorporates pop, rock, ballads and urban music. It includes "Viernes de tradición", "Por mi camino", "Cómo te va mi amor" and "Santo amor", which combines flamenco pop and reggaeton.

=== 2026: "Perro", "Untamed" and "Fiesta de despedida" ===
In April 2026, José Alfredo released the dance-pop single "Perro", accompanied by a music video directed by Gabriel Caro. In an interview with Primera Hora, he described the song as a shift toward a more confident and upbeat artistic direction.

In June, he released "Untamed", an English-language adaptation of "Perro". In an interview with Gayety, he discussed the song's themes of queer identity, freedom of expression and confidence.

In September, he released "Fiesta de despedida", written by José Alfredo and produced by Jesús Jara and Adrik. The song explores separation through gratitude and shared memories. Its music video was directed by Luis Ortiz, known as LAO, and José Alfredo, and filmed at Las Salinas in Lajas, Puerto Rico.

== Discography ==
Studio albums

- 2010: Valiente
- 2014: Hay otros mundos pero estan en mi cabeza
- 2018: T.R.E.S
- 2021: Hierba Mala
- 2023: En Mis Manos
- 2025: Mercurio Retrogrado

Compilations

- 2016: "Trayectoria"
- 2024: "Cronología"

Singles

- 2010: "¿Cómo Estás?"
- 2011: "Mirame Bien (Tu Infiel)"
- 2014: "Autosuficiente"
- 2014: "¡Me Enamoré!"
- 2014: "¡Me Enamoré!" (Latin Version) (Spain)
- 2014: "Mariposas de Papel"
- 2015: "Hoy Gano Yo" feat. Martin Ricca (Mexico)
- 2015: "Toda La Noche" feat. Siko Ruiz (Spain)
- 2015: "Fugitivos" feat. Marileyda
- 2016: "Bumbeo"
- 2016: "No Quiero Mas Regalos"
- 2017: "Si Me Besas" feat. Valeria Cid
- 2018: "Déjame Entrar"
- 2018: "Lobo"
- 2018: "Polos Opuestos"
- 2019: Cataclismo
- 2020: "Yo Llegaré" feat. Natalia Lugo & Marileyda
- 2020: "Alguien Cuida De Mi"
- 2020: "Escudo"
- 2021: "Hierba Mala"
- 2021: "El no soy yo"
- 2021: "Semaforo"
- 2022: "Imperfecto"
- 2022: "Houdini"
- 2022: "A-MARTE"
- 2023: "En Mis Manos"
- 2023: "HECATOMBE"
- 2024: "MARIPOSA"
- 2024: "POR MI CAMINO"
- 2024: "COMO TE VA MI AMOR"
- 2025: "SANTO AMOR"
- 2025: "A Prueba de Amor"
- 2025: "La Lista de los Chicos Malos"
- 2026: "PERRO"
- 2026: "Fiesta de despedida"

Collaborations

- 2014: "¡Me Enamoré!" feat. Siko Ruiz
- 2015: "Hoy Gano Yo" feat. Martin Ricca
- 2015: "Toda La Noche" feat. Siko Ruiz
- 2015: "Fugitivos" feat. Marileyda
- 2017: "Si Me Besas" feat. Valeria Cid
- 2018: "La Tormenta" feat. Janina
- 2020: "Yo Llegaré" feat. Natalia Lugo & Marileyda
- 2020: "Muévelo" feat. Danny Gonzalez
- 2024: "En sus marcas listos fuera" feat. Samara

Videography

- 2011: "¿Cómo Estás?"
- 2012: "Mirame Bien (Tu Infiel)"
- 2013: "Autosuficiente"
- 2014: "¡Me Enamoré!"
- 2014: "Mariposas de Papel"
- 2015: "Hoy Gano Yo" feat. Martin Ricca
- 2015: "Fugitivos" feat. Marileyda
- 2016: "Bumbeo"
- 2016: "No Quiero Mas Regalos"
- 2017: "Si Me Besas" feat. Valeria Cid
- 2018: "Déjame Entrar"
- 2018: "Lobo"
- 2018: "Polos Opuestos"
- 2019: Cataclismo
- 2020: "Yo Llegaré" feat. Natalia Lugo & Marileyda
- 2020: "Alguien Cuida De Mi"
- 2020: "Escudo"
- 2021: "Hierba Mala"
- 2021: "El no soy yo"
- 2021: "Semaforo"
- 2022: "Imperfecto"
- 2022: "Houdini"
- 2022: "A-MARTE"
- 2023: "En Mis Manos"
- 2023: "HECATOMBE"
- 2024: "MARIPOSA"
- 2024: "POR MI CAMINO"
- 2024: "COMO TE VA MI AMOR"
- 2025: "SANTO AMOR"
- 2025: "A Prueba de Amor"
- 2025: "La Lista de los Chicos Malos"
- 2026: "PERRO"
- 2026: "Fiesta de despedida"
