= Miguel Lourenço =

Miguel Lourenço may refer to:

- Miguel Lourenço (footballer, born 1920), Portuguese professional footballer
- Miguel Lourenço (footballer, born 1992), Portuguese professional footballer
