= Voranc =

Voranc is a given name and a surname. Notable people with the name include:

- Prežihov Voranc (1893–1950), Slovene writer and Communist political activist
- Voranc Boh (born 1993), Slovenian drama actor and musician
