= Ottokar Lorenz =

Austrian-German historian and genealogist (1832–1904)

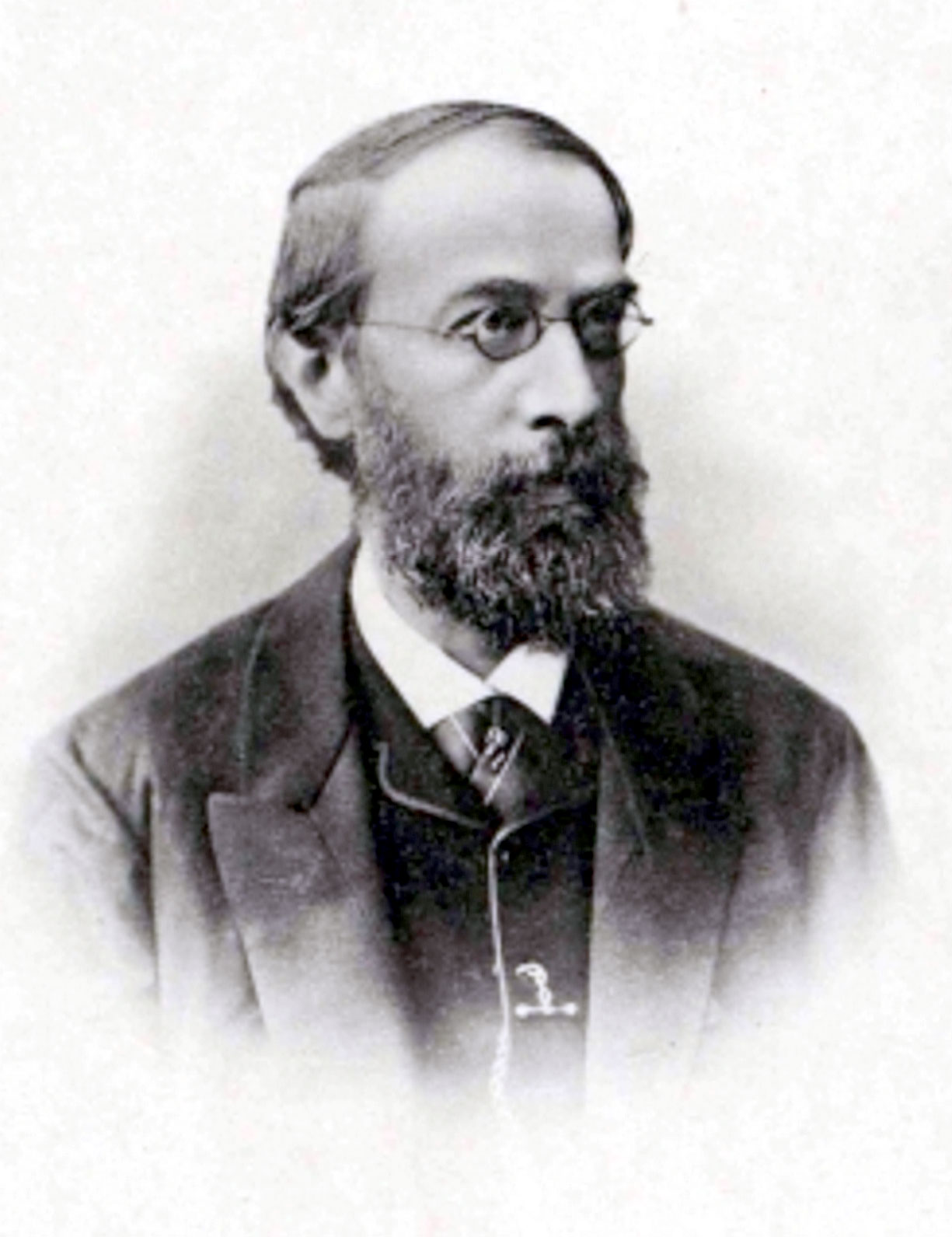
Ottokar Lorenz

Ottokar Lorenz (17 September 1832 – 13 May 1904) was an Austrian-German historian and genealogist. He was born in Iglau (now Jihlava, Czech Republic) and died in Jena. He was the father of chemist Richard Lorenz (1863-1929).

He studied philology, history and philosophy in Vienna, where his instructors included Hermann Bonitz, Joseph Aschbach and Albert Jäger. From 1861 to 1885, Lorenz was a professor of history at the University of Vienna, being appointed rector in 1880. Afterwards, he was a professor at the University of Jena.

He was a founder of modern "scientific genealogy". Some of his better written efforts are as follows:

- Deutsche Geschichte im 13. und 14. Jahrhundert, ("German history in the 13th and 14th centuries"), two volumes (1863–67).
- Drei Bücher Geschichte (1876; 2nd ed., 1879) (Three books of History).
- Deutschlands Geschichtsquellen im Mittelalter seit der Mitte des 13. Jahrhunderts [German history from the middle of the 13th Century]. W. Hertz., two volumes, 1886–87.
- Geschichte des Elsasses, ("History of Alsace"); with Wilhelm Scherer, 3rd edition 1886.
- Genealogisches Handbuch der europäischen Staatengeschichte, ("Genealogical textbook of European states history"), (1892).
- Lehrbuch der wissenschaftlichen Genealogie, ("Textbook of scientific genealogy"), (1898).
