= Maciej Lorenc =

Polish sociologist (born 1985)

- Born: 1985 (age 40–41)
- Citizenship: Polish
- Occupation: Sociologist

Maciej Zbigniew Lorenc (born 1985) is a sociologist, opinion journalist and translator specializing in psychedelic drugs.

== Biography ==
In 2009 he graduated in sociology from the Faculty of Applied Social Sciences and Resocialization at the University of Warsaw.

He was a co-founder of the Polskie Towarzystwo Psychodeliczne (Polish Psychedelic Society). He published in Tygodnik Powszechny, Krytyka Polityczna, Znak and the Polish editions of National Geographic and Focus.

He translated into Polish works by authors such as Albert Hofmann, Stanislav Grof, Michael Pollan, James Fadiman, Alan Watts, Rick Strassman and David Nutt.

== Books ==
- Czy psychodeliki uratują świat?. Wydawnictwo Krytyki Politycznej. 2019.
- Grzybobranie. Kulturowa historia psylocybiny. Wydawnictwo Krytyki Politycznej. 2023.
- Czy psychodeliki uratują Polskę?. Wydawnictwo Krytyki Politycznej. 2025.

== Translations into Polish ==
- Nutt, David (2021). Narkotyki bez paniki. Co trzeba wiedzieć o legalnych i nielegalnych środkach psychoaktywnych. Wydawnictwo Krytyki Politycznej.

Published originally as: Drugs Without the Hot Air: Minimising the Harms of Legal and Illegal Drugs. Cambridge: UIT. ISBN 978-1-906860-16-5.

- Nuwer, Rachel (2025). MDMA. Terapeutyczny potencjał ecstasy w leczeniu traumy, uzależnień, lęku społecznego i nie tylko. Illuminatio.

Published originally as: I Feel Love: MDMA and the Quest for Connection in a Fractured World. Bloomsbury Publishing. 2023. ISBN 978-1635579574.
