= Manny Laureano =

American trumpet player and conductor (born 1955)

Manny Laureano (born August 17, 1955) is an American trumpet player and conductor.

He was the principal trumpet of the Minnesota Orchestra from 1981 to 2025. Laureano began his musical studies in the New York City public school system and received his Bachelor of Music Degree from the Juilliard School in 1977. He was appointed Principal Trumpet of the Seattle Symphony, where he performed various solo works, including the rarely played concerto by Michael Haydn. He held this post for four years before serving as principal trumpet with the Minnesota Orchestra. He appeared numerous times with the Minnesota Orchestra as soloist playing concertos by Haydn, Hummel, Arutiunian, and Tomasi. He also performed the American premiere of the concerto by Viennese composer Friedrich Wildgans along with Leonard Slatkin conducting in Minneapolis in 1983. In 2006, Laureano appeared as a soloist along with trumpeter Doc Severinsen in a concerto for two trumpets by composer Steve Paulus. Since then, he has premiered two works for solo trumpet and orchestra, one, a concerto by Michael Gilbertson and another by Reinaldo Moya called A Matter of Taste. He has performed as soloist with a variety of ensembles throughout the United States including the South Dakota Symphony Orchestra, Des Moines Symphony, and the Chamber Orchestra of the Springs in Colorado.

As a conductor, he has worked with a variety of ensembles, ranging from having been Music Director of the Calhoun-Isles Community Band in Minneapolis, Music Director of the Metropolitan Symphony Orchestra, to several appearances in Young People's Concerts with the Minnesota Orchestra. He has been in demand as a clinician for young orchestras throughout the state of Minnesota. In 2002, Manny and his wife Claudette were invited to guest-conduct the National Suzuki Youth Festival Orchestra and were invited to serve again in 2004. Manny served as Co-Artistic Director of the Minnesota Youth Symphonies (MYS) from 1988 until 2020. He was the conductor of the MYS Symphony Orchestra and was the brass coach for the MYS Repertory Orchestra, conducted by Co-Artistic Director Claudette Laureano. Laureano served as Assistant Conductor of the Minnesota Orchestra during the 2005-06 season and served as conductor of the 2008-2009 Minnesota All-State orchestra. In recent years he has appeared as a guest conductor at Indiana University, as well as the Eastern Music Festival, St. Olaf College, and Bethel University.
