= Napoleão Laureano =

Napoleão Rodrigues Laureano (June 13, 1913 – May 31, 1951) was a Brazilian cancer specialist. Napoleão Laureano Hospital in João Pessoa, Paraiba is named for him.
