= Christian Laurent =

Christian Laurent is an electrical engineer with the National Center for Scientific Research in Toulouse, France. Laurent was named a Fellow of the Institute of Electrical and Electronics Engineers (IEEE) in 2015 for his research into electrical aging and charge transport in insulating polymers.
