= Hans Lorenz =

German engineer and university teacher (1865–1940)

Hans Lorenz (24 March 1865 in Wilsdruff, Kingdom of Saxony – 4 July 1940) was a German engineer and mathematical physicist. He was an influential professor at the University of Göttingen and at Danzig where he was involved in establishing the training of engineers with sound mathematical and physics foundations.

Lorenz was born in Wilsdruff, Kingdom of Saxony, the son of a teacher. He studied at Leipzig University and then at the Royal Saxon Polytechnic in Dresden where he studied under Gustav Zeuner. Graduating in 1889, he went to work with the company of L. A. Riedinger in Augsburg and three years later he worked with Escher-Wyss of Zurich on refrigeration. In 1894, he became an industrial consultant for refrigeration technology and also received a doctorate from the Ludwig-Maximilians-Universität München for his work on the thermodynamic limits of cooling. He also founded the journal Zeitschrift für die gesamte Kälte-Industrie. It was unusual at the time for engineers to be able to conduct scientific research. He was appointed a professor of applied physics at the University of Halle in 1896 and in 1900, he succeeded Eugen Meyer as director of the institute for technical physics. He wrote a textbook on mathematical physics which included work on vibrations, oscillations and damping. During this period he also worked on the hydrodynamics and turbines, although his mathematical approach was criticized by Richard von Mises. In 1904, he moved to the Technische Hochschule Danzig, retiring in 1934. Lorenz's work included the mathematics and physics of refrigeration, the strength of materials, vibrations, fluid dynamics, ballistics and even astrophysics.
