= Tom Laurenson =

Australian rules footballer, born 1906

Personal information
- Full name: Thomas William Laurenson
- Born: 16 October 1906; Kotupna, Victoria
- Died: 14 January 1969 (aged 62); Kyabram, Victoria
- Height: 178 cm (5 ft 10 in)

Playing career^{1}
Years	Club	Games (Goals)
1929	Fitzroy	2 (0)
- ^{1} Playing statistics correct to the end of 1929.

Thomas William Laurenson (16 October 1906 – 14 January 1969) was an Australian rules footballer who played with Fitzroy in the Victorian Football League (VFL).
