= Lovrović =

Lovrović is a Croatian surname derived from a masculine given name Lovro. Notable people with the surname include:

- Dan Lovrović (born 1984), Croatian sailor
- Marin Lovrović Jr. (born 1973), Croatian sailor
