= João Lourenço (disambiguation) =

João Lourenço is the president of Angola.

João Lourenço may also refer to:

- João Lourenço (Portuguese footballer, born 1942)
- João Lourenço (Brazilian footballer, born 2005)
- João Lourenço (Portuguese cyclist)
