= Maria Antonieta Lorente =

Geologist

Maria Antonieta Lorente is a geologist who specializes in stratigraphy and biostratigraphy.

== Education ==
Lorente earned a Geological Engineering degree as well as an MSc (Master of Science) in Sedimentary Geology degree at the Central University of Venezuela. Lorente earned her Doctor in Mathematics and Natural sciences degree at the University of Amsterdam. She also has completed her education as a Technologist in the Food industry.

== Career ==
Lorente began her career as a lecturer in Historical Geology and Paleontology at the Central University of Venezuela. She excelled as a micropaleontologist adept in palynology, and developed a patent that used quantitative palynofacies for reservoir characterization and correlation. Lorente started working as palynologist in Maraven SA. Later as a career specialist, she led a multidisciplinary team of sedimentologists, geochemists, petrophysics, and biostratigraphers. Her team supported the exploratory activities of the company. Eventually, Lorente became Head of Geological Laboratories as well as Leader of Stratigraphy; gaining the responsibility of leadership for teams of experts. Lorente also continued to manage these experts' team during this time overseeing specialized geological information. She was then promoted to the role of "Planning and Strategy Manager" at PDVSA where she proposed the 2001 plan for the Exploration Business Unit's short, medium, and long-term objectives. Lorente retired from PDVSA with the aspiration of creating her own consulting service in the field of geology and environmental sciences. Years later Lorente shifted to the food industry where she had success with research and development, along with environmental efforts for a local company in Spain. Lorente currently teaches online and mentors younger generations of Geology students at the Central University of Venezuela while also working as an International Consultant in Geology. She is also currently a senior advisor to Ellington Geological Services in Houston Texas.

== Notable achievements ==
Maria Antonieta Lorente was awarded the American Association of Petroleum Geologists Distinguished Service award in 1996. This award is "presented to members who have distinguished themselves in singular and beneficial long-term service to AAPG".

Lorente was chosen as one of the nine convenors for the Paleogeography and Hydrocarbon Potential of the La Luna Formation and Related Cretaceous Anoxic Depositional Systems for the September 7–9 meeting in 2000 in Caracas, Venezuela.

== Publications ==
Maria Antioneta Lorente has published over 60 articles in geology, stratigraphy and petroleum geology.

- Paleoecologia y Paleoambiente del Miembro Quevedo (Formacion Navay) en las proximidades de Santa Barbara, Estado Barinas, 1977.
- Palynology and palynofacies of the Upper Tertiary in Venezuela, 1986.
- Sand depositional styles in lower Lagunillas Member (lower Miocene) of central-western area of Maracaibo Lake, Venezuela, and their influence in reservoir modeling, 1988.
- Estudio Estratigrafico del Flanco Norandino en el Sector Lobatera-El Vigia [PAPER IN SPANISH] Stratigraphic Study of the North Andean Flank Region in Lobatera-El Vigia, 1988.
- Estudio estratigrafico del flanco Norandino (Stratigraphic study of the Norandino flank), 1988.
- Textural characteristics of organic matter in several sub-environments of the Orinoco upper delta, 1990.
- Digital image analysis: an approach for quantitative characterisation of organic facies and palynofacies, 1990.
- Process and system for digital analysis of images applied to stratigraphic data, 1990.
- A Multilevel Approach to Organic Matter Classification, 1991.
- Facies and sedimentary environments of the cretaceous La Luna Formation in San Pedro del Rio Section, Venezuelan Andes: A multidisciplinary study, 1993.
- El Paleogeno En La Cuenca De Maracaibo, Venezuela (The Paleogene in the Maracaibo Basin, Venezuela), 1995.
- Andean tectonics as a cause for changing drainage patterns in Miocene northern South America, 1995.
- Late Cretaceous in western Venezuela, a new biostratigraphical approach, 1996.
- Geochemistry and organic facies of La Luna-Tres Esquinas cycle: Maturity, biomarkers and kerogen issues, 1996.
- New contributions for the dating of the main tectonic events and lithostratigraphic units of the Maracaibo basin, Western Venezuela (paper in Spanish), 1997.
- Chronostratigraphy, depositional environments, and reservoir potential of Eocene rocks, southern and central Mérida Andes (Maracaibo and Barinas/Apure basins), western Venezuela, 1997.
- A Cretaceous-Tertiary boundary section at Rio Lora, Mérida Andes, Western Venezuela, 1997.
- Tectonostratigraphic Framework and Paleogeography of the Maracaibo Basin during the Paleogene (Paper in Spanish), 1997.
- Origin and depositional environments of Turonian–Maastrichtian organic-rich and phosphatic sediments of western Venezuela, 1997.
- Area central del Lago de Maracaibo: la Bioestratigrafia como herramienta para la interpretacion paleoestructural del Eoceno (Central area of Lake Maracaibo: Biostratigraphy as a tool for the paleo-structural interpretation of the Eocene), 1997.
- Rangos de extensión de especies-índice marinas y terrestres en el margen suroccidental del Tetis: La transiión Cretácico – Paleogeno (Range of extension of marine and terrestrial index-species on the southwestern margin of the Tethys: The Cretaceous - Paleogene transition), 1997.
- Datación de Secuencias oligomiocenas en el área de Alturitas y sus implicaciones para el conocimiento de la evolución tectono-estratigráfica de Perijá (Dating of oligomiocene sequences in the Alturitas area and its implications for the knowledge of the tectono-stratigraphic evolution of Perijá), 1997.
- Nuevas determinaciones de carbono orgánico total (COT) en formaciones cretácicas con perfiles convencionales en el noroeste del Lago de Maracaibo. Estado Zulia (New determinations of total organic carbon (TOC) in Cretaceous formations with conventional profiles in the northwest of Lake Maracaibo, Zulia state), 1997.
- Bioestratigrafia y edad de sedimentación de la Formación Misoa en la Serrania de Trujillo (Biostratigraphy and sedimentation age of the Misoa Formation in the Serrania de Trujillo), 1997.
- Macro Estructural y Paleogeografia de la Cuenca de Maracaibo durante el Paleógeno (Structural Macro and Paleogeography of the Maracaibo Basin during the Paleogene), 1997.
- Implicaciones tectónicas de un evento estructural en el Cretácico Superior (Santoniense–Campaniense) de Venezuela Occidental (Tectonic implications of a structural event in the Upper Cretaceous (Santonian – Campanian) of western Venezuela.), 1997.
- Marco Tectonoestratigrafico y paleogeografia de la Cuenca de Maracaibo y areas vecinas durante el Paleogeno (Tectonostratigraphic framework and paleogeography of the Maracaibo Basin and neighboring areas during the Paleogene), 1998.
- Palaeoecology, palaeogeography and depositional environments of Upper Cretaceous rocks of western Venezuela, 1999.
- Geochemical characterization of oceanographic and climatic changes recorded in upper Albian to lower Maastrichtian strata, western Venezuela, 1999.
- Microfacies del Miembro Tres Esquinas de la Formación La Luna y sus Implicaciones Paleoambientales (Microfacies of the Tres Esquinas Member of the La Luna Formation and its Paleoenvironmental Implications), 2000.
- Diagenetic Evaluation of La Luna Formation at Tachira and Mérida States, Western Venezuela (Diagenetic Evaluation of La Luna Formation at Tachira and Mérida States, Western Venezuela), 2000.
- La Palinociclicidad: una herramienta útil para el sedimentólogo (Palinocyclicity: a useful tool for the sedimentologist), 2000.
- Late Cretaceous Upwelling in the Southwest of the Thetys Sea, a Case History From the Barinas Basin, Venezuela, 2000.
- Paleoclimatology in Fossils and the Future, Paleontology in the 21st Century, 2000.
- Industrial Paleotology en Fossils and the Future, Paleontology in the 21st Century, 2000.
- Birth and death of the Late Cretaceous "La Luna Sea", and origin of the Tres Esquinas phosphorites, 2000.
- Seismostratigraphic study of a Miocene–Pleistocene subsurface interval, northern Monagas, Eastern Venezuela Basin, 2001.
- Paleogeography Of Late Cretaceous Upwelling In The Barinas Basin: A Prediction Tool For Potential Source Rock Distribution, 2001.
- The palynofloral succession across the Cretaceous to Paleocene transition zone, Mérida Andes Western Venezuela, 2001.
- Series analysis application of time for cyclic pattern determination in the Cretaceous-Tertiary limit (Venezuela western), 2001.
- Sedimentology and cyclicity in the La Luna Formation (Late Coniacian – Early Campanian), San Miguel River Section, Mérida State, Venezuela, 2002.
- Cicloestratigrafía de las Formaciones Morichito, Las Piedras y Mesa, Norte de Monagas, Venezuela Oriental (Cyclo-stratigraphy of the Morichito, Las Piedras and Mesa Formations, North of Monagas, Eastern Venezuela), 2002.
- Biofacies development related to upwelling systems based on high-resolution biostratigraphic studies in southwest Venezuela, 2003.
- Orbital forcing of organic-rich deposits formation: record of the Coniacian–Santonian OAE3 (La Luna Formation, San Miguel River Section, Venezuela), 2003.
- High-Impact Cycle-Stratigraphy (HIC) A Method Applied in a Miocene-Pleistocene Subsurface Section, Northern Monagas, Eastern Venezuela Basin, 2003.
- Biostratigraphic, sedimentologic, and chemostratigraphic study of the La Luna Formation (late Turonian–Campanian) in the San Miguel and Las Hernandez sections, western Venezuela, 2003.
- Paleogeography and stratigraphy of the La Luna Formation and related Cretaceous anoxic depositional systems, 2003.
- Late Cretaceous anoxia and lateral microfacies changes in the Tres Esquinas member, La Luna Formation, western Venezuela, 2003.
- A record of long-and short-term environmental and climatic change during OAE3: La Luna Formation, Late Cretaceous (Santonian–early Campanian), Venezuela, 2004.
- A structuring event of Campanian age in western Venezuela, interpreted from seismic and paleontological data, 2009.
- The origin and evolution of the Caribbean plate, 2009.
- The geology and evolution of the region between North and South America, 2009.
- The geology and evolution of the region between North and South America, 2009.
- Tectonostratigraphic evolution of the Morichito piggyback basin, Eastern Venezuelan Basin, 2011.
- Landmark Papers in Applied Biostratigraphy Best Practices, 2017.
- Geochemical and Foraminiferal Responses to Anthropogenic Activities Along the Coastal Regions of Matagorda and Brazoria Counties, Texas, 2017.
- A Multidisciplinary Study on a Representative Section From Masirah Basin-Oman, 2019.
- Advanced Quantitative Stratigraphic Data Integration of Conventional and Unconventional Plays, 2019.
- The Evolution of Women's Role in Engineering and Geosciences in the Oil Industry From the 20th to the 21st Century: A Documented Case History From Venezuela, 2020.
- Palynofacies, environments, and climate changes in the Magdalena River Basin, 2021.
- FIRST RESULTS FROM A QUANTITATIVE PALYNOFACIES STUDY OF RECENT ENVIRONMENTS FROM THE LOWER MAGDALENA RIVER BASIN, COLOMBIA, 2021.
