= Lorie O'Clare =

American writer

Lorie O'Clare is an American author of erotic romance, romantic suspense and paranormal romance novels.

The anthology Men of Danger, which featured her story “Love Me 'til Death,” was a New York Times bestseller.

== Bibliography ==
=== Published by St. Martin’s Press ===
- Long, Lean and Lethal, 2009
- Tall, Dark and Deadly, 2009
- Get Lucky, 2011
- Play Dirty, 2010
- Strong, Sleek and Sinful, 2010
- Stay Hungry, 2011
- Run Wild, 2012
- Slow Heat, 2012
- Hot Pursuit, 2013

=== Published by Ellora's Cave ===
- Lunewulf Law, 2003
- Blue Moon, 2004
- In Her Blood, 2004
- In Her Nature, 2004
- In Her Soul, 2004
- In Her Dreams, 2004
- Jaded Prey, 2004
- Man Of Her Dreams, 2004
- Sex Traders, 2004
- Tainted Purity, 2004
- Waiting for Yesterday, 2004
- After Dusk, 2005
- Taming Heather, 2005
- Challenged Pursuit, 2005
- Caught!, 2005
- The First Time, 2005
- Lotus Blooming, 2005
- Pursuit, 2005
- Waiting for Dawn, 2005
- Dead World, 2006
- Far From Innocent, 2006
- Living Extinct, 2006
- Penance, 2006
- Shara's Challenge, 2006
- Alpha Exiled, 2007
- For Life, 2007
- Forbidden Attraction, 2007
- Issue of Trust, 2007
- Taking it All, 2007
- Til Death, 2007
- Full Moon Rising, 2008
- Unshackled, 2008
- Vision Captured, 2008
- Vision Controller, 2008
- Vision Fulfilled, 2008
- Challenged, 2009
- Elements Unbound, 2009
- Feather Down, 2009
- Feather Possessed, 2009
- Wicked, 2009
- Vision Lust, 2009
- Vision Revealed, 2009
- Black Seduction, 2010
- Black Passion, 2010
- Feather Torn, 2010
- Feather Adored, 2010
- Black Surrender, 2011
- With Her Hunger, 2011

=== Published by Kensington ===
- Pleasure Island, 2009
- Seduction Island, 2009
- Temptation Island, 2011
- Island of Desire, 2012

=== Anthologies ===
- Primal Heat, Ellora's Cave, 2004
- Things That Go Bump in the Night IV, Ellora's Cave, 2004
- Forbidden Fantasies, Pocket Books, 2008
- Under The Covers, Kensington Books, 2009
- Men of Danger, St. Martin’s Press, 2010
- The Bodyguard, St. Martin’s Press, 2010
- Feel The Heat, Kensington, 2011
