= Henry Laurence =

Henry Laurence may refer to:

- Henry Laurence (martyr) (died 1555), English Protestant martyr
- Henry Laurence (academic), Oxford college head in the 16th-century

== See also ==
- Henry Laurens (1724–1792), American Founding Father
