= Laurynas Rimavičius =

Lithuanian footballer

Personal information
- Date of birth: 21 October 1985 (age 41)
- Place of birth: Kėdainiai, Soviet Union
- Height: 1.88 m (6 ft 2 in)
- Position: Midfielder

Team information
- Current team: FK Šiauliai
- Number: 31

Senior career*
Years	Team	Apps	(Gls)
2004–2005	FK Ekranas	14	(0)
2006	FK Nevėžis Kėdainiai	26	(1)
2007–2008	FK Ekranas	43	(1)
2009	FC Irtysh Pavlodar	19	(1)
2010	FK Kruoja Pakruojis	22	(2)
2011–present	FK Šiauliai	28	(2)

International career^{‡}
2008	Lithuania	1	(0)
- * Club domestic league appearances and goals as of December 2011 ‡ National team caps and goals as of 4 October 2008 (UTC)

Laurynas Rimavičius (born 21 October 1985) is a Lithuanian football defender currently playing for FK Šiauliai.

Rimavičius made one appearance for the Lithuania national football team during 2008.
