= Richard Lorenz (artist) =

Western American genre artist from Germany

- Lorenz in 1885
- Born: 9 February 1858; Voigtstedt, Thuringia, Kingdom of Prussia
- Died: 4 August 1915 (aged 57); Milwaukee, Wisconsin, US
- Education: Royal Academy of Art in Weimar, Germany
- Alma mater: Weimar Art School
- Notable work: "Burial on the Plains"
- Style: Western genre
- Spouse: Single
- Awards: Carl Alexander art prize

Richard Lorenz (9 February 1858 – 4 August 1915) was a German artist known for his paintings of scenes from the Western United States. He specialized in painting horses.

== Early life ==
Richard Lorenz was born on 9 February 1858 in Voigtstedt, Thuringia, Kingdom of Prussia. At 15 years old he was sent to the Royal Academy of Art in Weimar, Germany, to study sculpture and drawing with Heinrich Albert Brendel who specialized in drawing horses and other animals. In Weimar, Lorenz also studied art as a student of German artist Theodor Hagen. He spent eight years in the Weimar Art School and he won the Carl Alexander art prize twice. He moved to Milwaukee, Wisconsin, in 1885.

== Career ==
In 1885 Lorenz began working with a group of panoramist artists in Milwaukee. His contribution on the large canvases was to paint horses, and he became a specialist in painting them. In 1887 Lorenz left the group and traveled in the western United States sketching scenes from the west. When he returned to Milwaukee in 1891, he taught at the Milwaukee School of Art and began painting scenes based on his sketches. In 1906 he won the Osborn Prize for the best painting (American Subject). The prize came with a $1000 award.

He was a member of the Society of Western Artists. The American Museum of Western Art – The Anschutz Collection houses his most famous painting, which is called Burial on the Plains (c. 1890).

Lorenz took risks to get the best perspective for paintings. In 1896 he climbed a tree to sketch some workers cutting down trees in Star Lake, Wisconsin. One of the trees that was cut down fell in Lorenz's direction: he jumped from the tree and broke his leg. The Chicago Tribune reported that Lorenz jumped a distance of twenty feet in order to escape instant death.

== Death ==
Lorenz died on 4 August 1915 in Milwaukee, Wisconsin, after suffering a stroke. Lorenz was 57 years old when he died and he was not married.

In 2005 he was posthumously awarded a Wisconsin Visual Art Achievement Award.

== Gallery ==
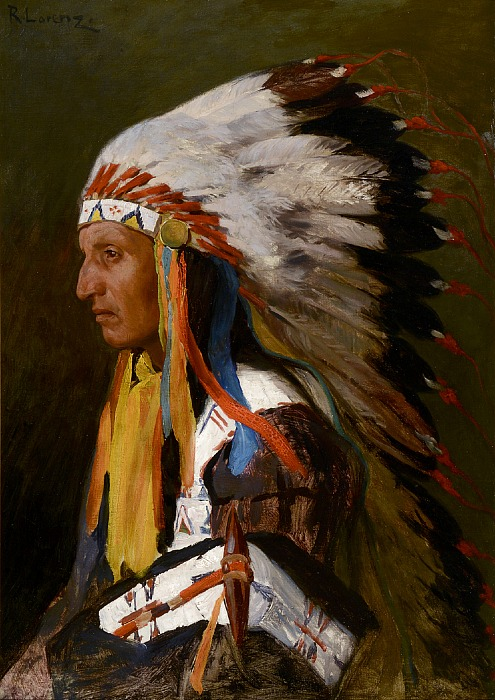
Indian Chief, c. 1890s oil on canvas

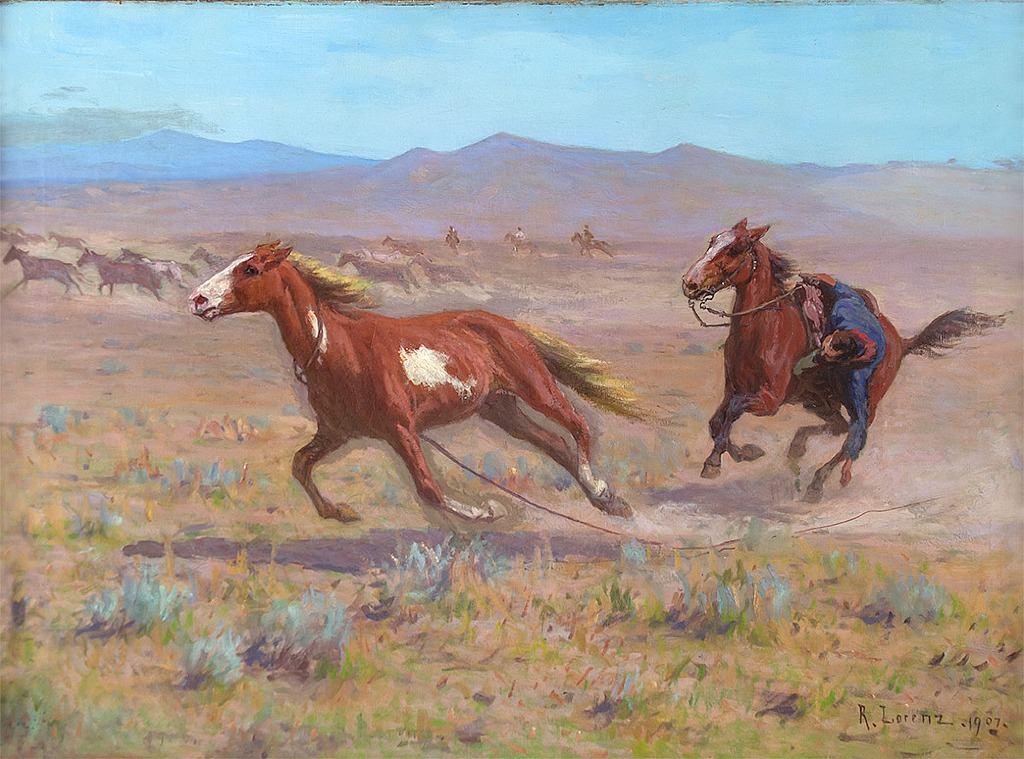
Chasing the Line (1907)

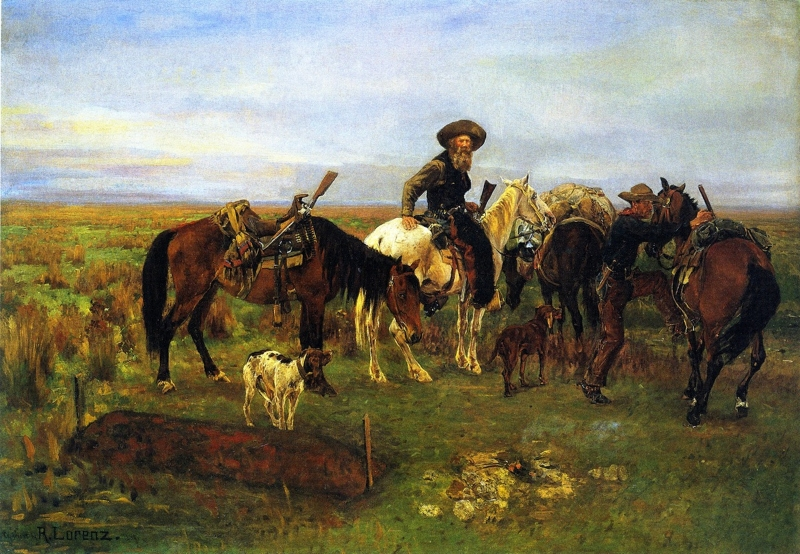
Burial on the Plains by Richard Lorenz 1890
