= Michael Lorenz (veterinarian) =

American scientist

Michael Lorenz was the dean of the Center for Veterinary Health Sciences, Oklahoma State University–Stillwater, Oklahoma, from 2001-2011.

He obtained his Bachelor of Science, Animal Sciences, Oklahoma State University; D.V.M., Oklahoma State University; internship, Cornell University.

Lorenz became Associate Dean for Academic Affairs in August 1997, Interim Dean in July 2001 and was appointed Dean in April 2004.
