= Laurențiu Țigăeru Roșca =

Romanian politician

Laurențiu Țigăeru Roșca (born February 27, 1970) is a Romanian politician.

He was born in Focșani and graduated from the Bucharest Academy of Economic Studies in 1999. He joined the National Liberal Party in 2011 and was a member of the Chamber of Deputies of Romania during the 2012–2016 legislature.
