= Lovre =

Lovre is both a surname and a masculine given name. Notable people with the name include:

== Surname ==
- Goran Lovre (born 1982), Serbian footballer
- Harold Lovre (1904–1972), American politician

== Given name ==
- Lovre Čirjak (born 1991), Croatian footballer
- Lovre Kalinić (born 1990), Croatian footballer
- Lovre Vulin (born 1984), Croatian footballer
