= Loran =

Loran may refer to:

== People ==
- Loran (footballer) (born 1998), Brazilian footballer
- Loran Kenstley Cole (1966–2024), American convicted murderer
- Loran L. Lewis (1825–1916), New York judge and politician
- Loran Nordgren, American behavioral scientist and author
- Loran Whitelock (1930–2014), American botanist who specialized in Cycads
- Berta Loran (1926–2025), Polish-born Brazilian actress
- Gabriela Loran (born 1993), Brazilian actress

== Fictional characters ==
- Loran Cehack, the protagonist in the anime series Turn A Gundam
- First Maje Loran, the leader of the Kazon-Hobii from Star Trek: Voyager
- Loran (Greyhawk), knight in the World of Greyhawk campaign setting for Dungeons & Dragons

== Places ==
- Loran, Iran, a village in Khuzestan Province, Iran
- Loran Valley, in Jammu and Kashmir, India

== Other uses ==
- LORAN, a World War II radio-based navigation system, also known as Loran-A
- Loran-C, an improved navigation system that replaced the original LORAN
- Loran (death knight), a fictional character in the World of Greyhawk campaign setting for the Dungeons & Dragons role-playing game
- Loran Scholars Foundation, a national charitable organization in Canada which awards the Loran Award

== See also ==
- Loren (name)
- Loren (disambiguation)
- Lorun (disambiguation)
