= Richard Lorenz (chemist) =

Austrian chemist (1863–1929)

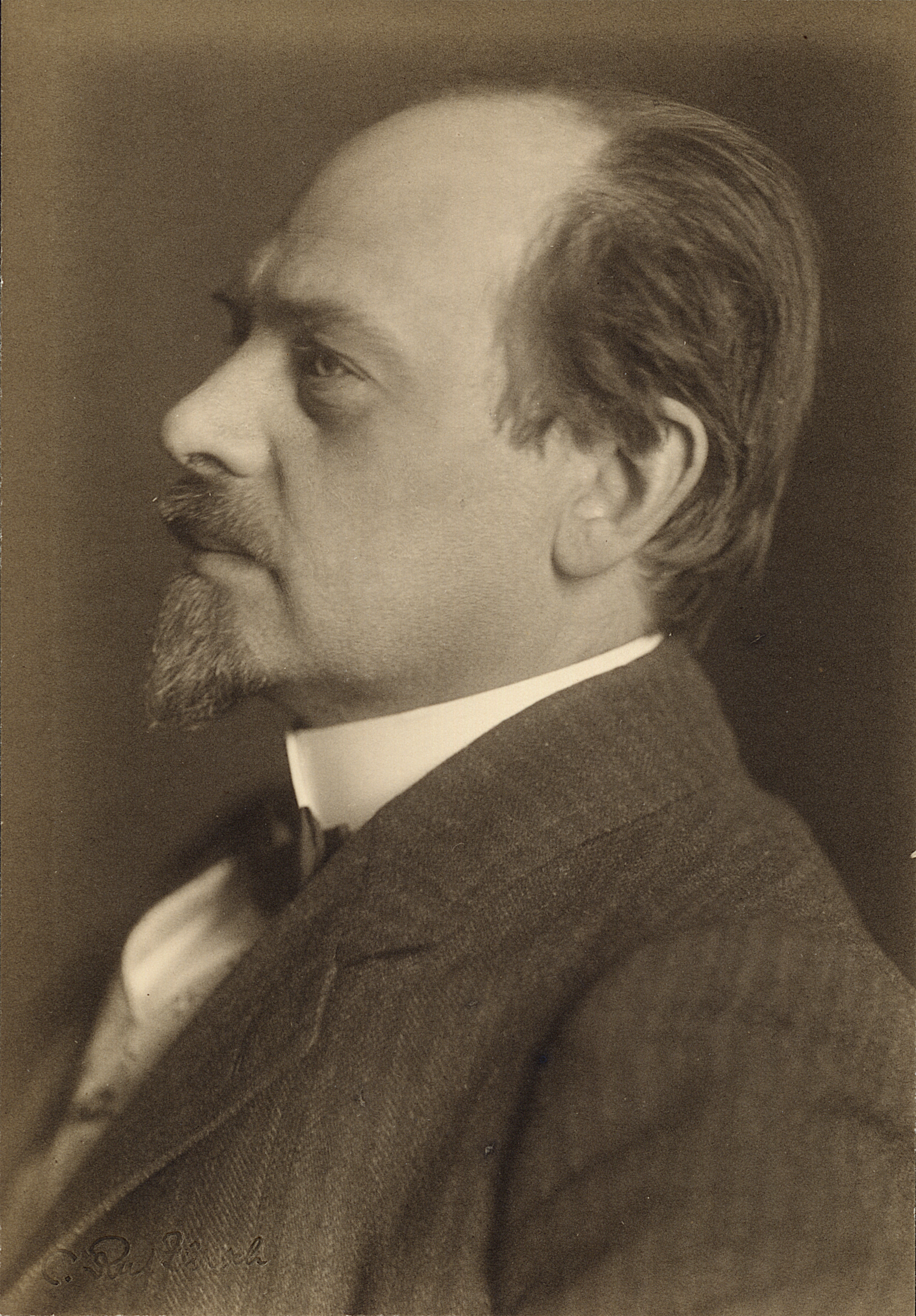
Richard Lorenz, c. 1905

Richard Lorenz (13 April 1863 in Vienna – 23 June 1929 in Frankfurt am Main) was an Austrian chemist. He was the son of historian Ottokar Lorenz.

He studied chemistry at the Universities of Vienna and Jena, receiving his doctorate in 1888 with a dissertation on the valence of boron, "Beiträge zur Kenntnis der Valenz des Bors". After graduation, he worked as an assistant in the biological institute at the University of Rostock. In 1892 he obtained his habilitation in physical chemistry at University of Göttingen.

In 1896 he was named an associate professor of electrochemistry at the Eidgenössische Polytechnikum in Zurich. During the following year he attained a full professorship. In 1910 he relocated to the Frankfurt Academy, where he worked until the founding of the University of Frankfurt am Main (1914). Here he served as a professor of physical chemistry up until his death in June 1929.

He was the author of numerous papers in the field of physical chemistry. He is remembered for his work involving the electrochemical behavior of molten salts.

== Selected works ==
- Ueber die ausbildung des elektrochemikers, 1901 – On the training of electrochemists.
- Elektrochemisches Praktikum, 1901 – Practical electrochemistry.
- Die elektrolyse geschmolzener salze, 1905 – The electrolytic molten salts.
- Raumerfüllung und ionenbeweglichkeit. 1922.

He was also an editor of the journal "Zeitschrift für anorganische Chemie".
