= American Museum of Western Art – The Anschutz Collection =

Nonprofit museum in Denver, US

Coordinates: 39.7447°N 104.9880°W

The American Museum of Western Art – The Anschutz Collection is a non-profit museum located in Denver, Colorado. Founded in 2010, it is the permanent home for The Anschutz Collection, a formerly private collection of paintings that surveys the art of the American West from the early 19th century to the present.

== Overview ==
With a collection that spans nearly two centuries of art history, the museum's holdings include examples of early American expeditionary painting, Hudson River School and Rocky Mountain School landscapes, 19th-century American narrative painting, early American modernism, Expressionism, Cubism and Abstraction, American Regionalism, “New Deal Art”, and Abstract Expressionism.Painters well represented include George Catlin, Henry Farny, Thomas Hill, Albert Bierstadt, Frederic Remington, Maynard Dixon, Ernest Blumenschein, Victor Higgins, Georgia O'Keeffe, Marsden Hartley, Emil Bisstram, Birger Sandzen, Thomas Hart Benton, Frank Mechau, and Kim Wiggins.

The Anschutz Collection of American Museum of Western Art is an outcome of the efforts made over 50 years by the Anschutz family, and the credit goes to businessman, Philip Anschutz, who is in oil, real estate and telecommunications. A lover of art, he chose this passion of his to race cars or racehorses. And to promote American Idealism he toured widely to 10 different countries, including the former Soviet Union.

The American Museum of Western Art is run under the directorship of his daughter, Sarah Hunt.

== Gallery ==
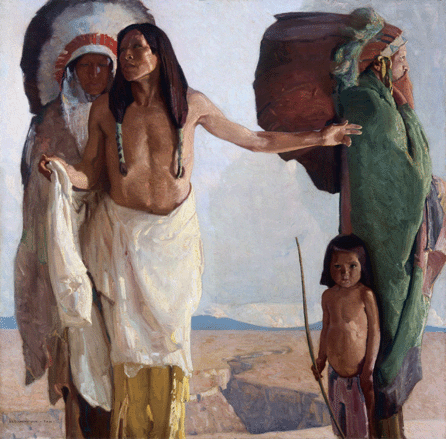
Ernest L. Blumenschein, The Peacemaker (The Orator), 1913. The American Museum of Western Art: The Anschutz Collection

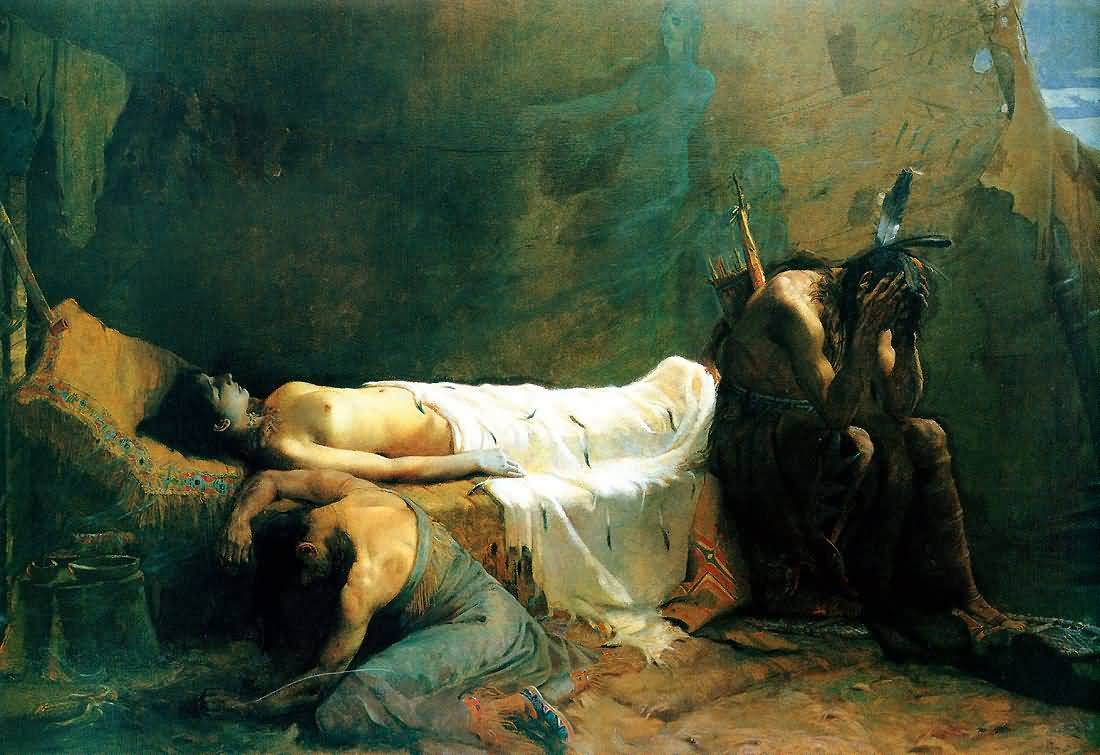
William de Leftwich Dodge, The Death of Minnehaha, 1892. The American Museum of Western Art: The Anschutz Collection

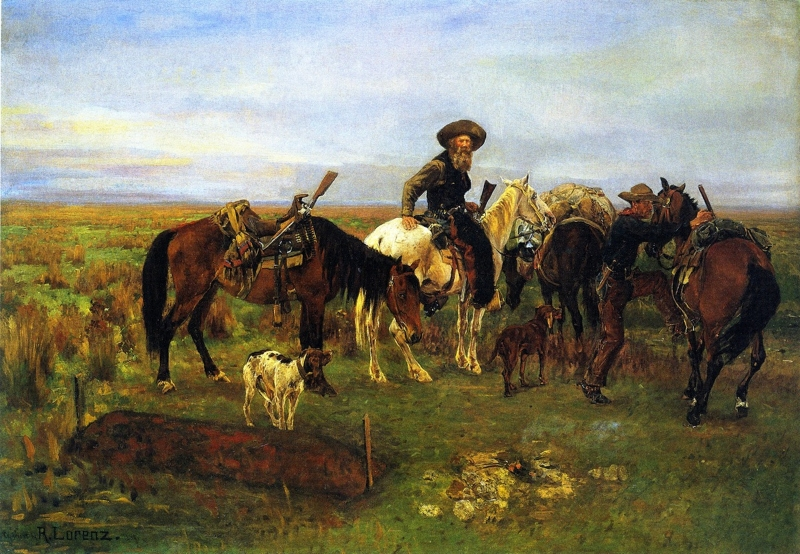
Burial on the Plains by Richard Lorenz 1890
