= Patricio Lorente =

Argentinian Wikimedian (born 1969)

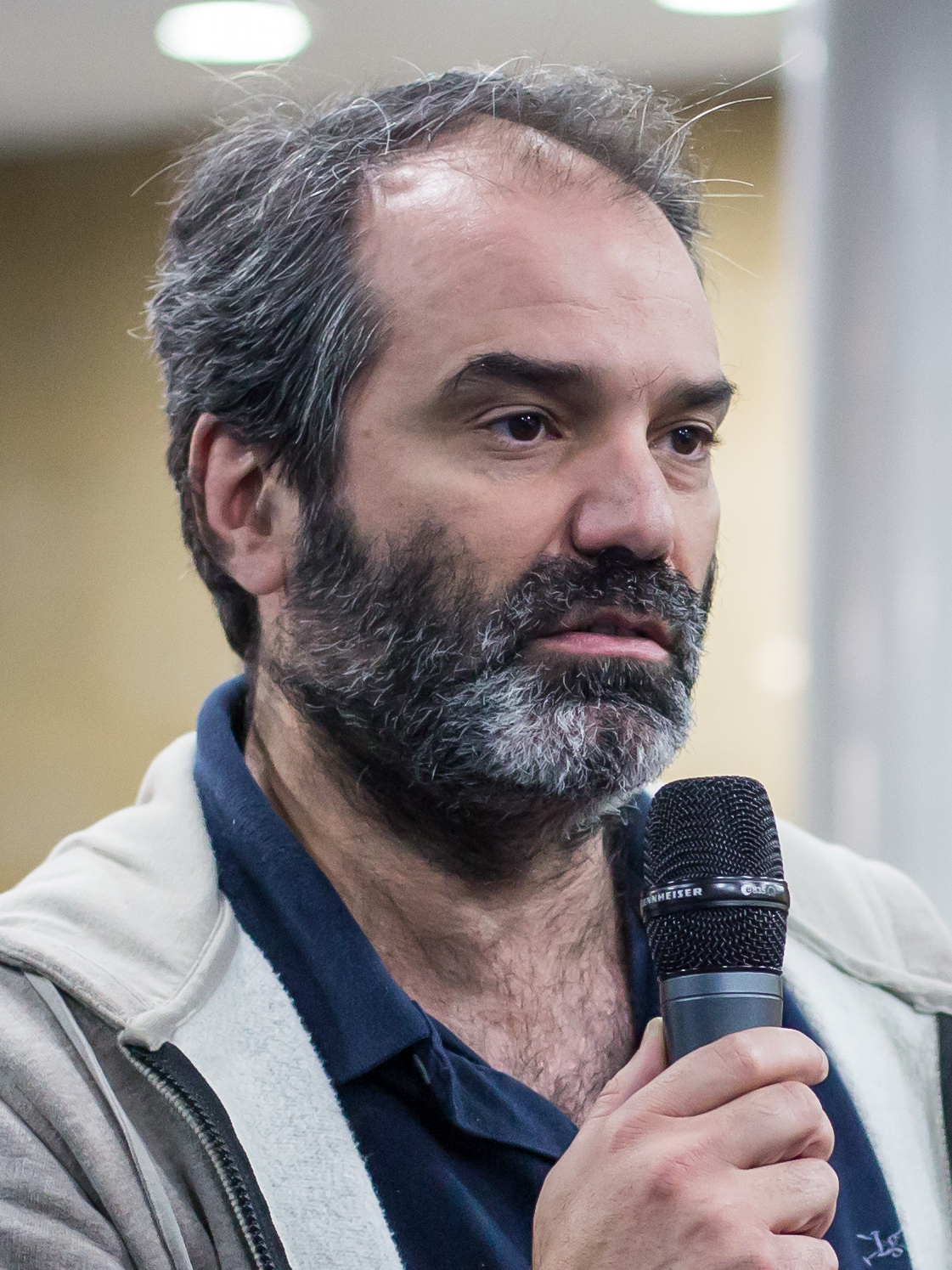
- Patricio Lorente

Chair of the Wikimedia Foundation
- In office 16 July 2015 – 23 June 2016
- Preceded by: Jan-Bart de Vreede
- Succeeded by: Christophe Henner

Personal details
- Born: 19 March 1969 (age 57) La Plata, Argentina
- Occupation: General Secretary of Universidad Nacional de la Plata, Chair Emeritus of the Wikimedia Foundation

Patricio Lorente (born March 19, 1969) is an Argentine scholar and general secretary of the National University of La Plata.

== Biography ==
Lorente was born in La Plata on March 19, 1969. He is the only male among the four children of his parents, Hugo Enrique Lorente, a telecommunications engineer of Basque descent, and Beatriz Gliemmo, an architect of Italian descent.

He completed the Escuela Número 18 de Gonnet and high school in the Colegio Nacional de 1 y 49. Later, he studied philosophy, law, letters and computer science at the National University of La Plata, but without graduating.

For several years he worked in the field of Development Cooperation, managing the implementation, monitoring and evaluation of local development projects funded by the Italian government and the European Union. He worked to strengthen local capacity as a condition for development, transcending the traditional approach of north–south cooperation by promoting South-South. He also supported decentralized cooperation by building horizontal networks of exchange between different cities and regions of Argentina.

Since 2004, Patricio has served in the National University of La Plata, first as Prosecretary of Administration, then as General Prosecretary and subsequently as General Secretary. As the General Secretary he manages the strategic planning and the everyday issues and conflicts of a large and restless community, including both academics and student organizations. As with all public universities in Argentina, there is no tuition and enrollment is free.

Patricio has devoted his time to outreach activities in education, with particular interest in off-wiki activities. He is the author of a booklet published by Wikimedia Argentina called "Wikipedia in the classroom" and, representing Wikimedia Argentina, he was a member of the Advisory Board of Conectar Igualdad ("connect equality"), a government program that is delivering more than three million netbooks to all public high school students in Argentina. As a result of this work, many wiki-related activities were launched. The National Ministry of Education opened a special site with tutorials, documents and guides about Wikipedia and education. There is also a special pilot program in more than 200 schools across the country - “Escuelas de Innovación” (Innovative Schools) - that directly trains teachers on possible uses of Wikimedia projects for their classes, not only in terms of creating content but also regarding notions of relevance, content verification and discussions on neutrality issues.

In 2020 he published, Patricio Lorente (29 January 2020). El conocimiento hereje. Una historia de Wikipedia (in Spanish). Paidos. ISBN 978-950-12-9894-9. OL 46535602M. Wikidata Q83816618. ("Heretical Knowledge: A history of Wikipedia").

He lives in City Bell, Argentina.

== Wikimedia Foundation activity ==
Patricio joined the Spanish Wikipedia as an editor April 20, 2005. He has been an admin (sysop, bureaucrat) since 2006. He is also a founding member of Wikimedia Argentina and was its president from 2007 to 2012. He was responsible for the organization of Wikimania 2009 in Buenos Aires and has participated as an organizer or speaker in numerous conferences, seminars and workshops on Wikipedia/Wikimedia in Argentina and other Latin American countries (Colombia, Ecuador, Mexico, Peru). He was one of the primary organizers of the first Ibero-American Wikimedia Summit, held in Buenos Aires in 2011, which helped bring together representatives from both established Wikimedia chapters and informal working groups throughout Latin America, Spain, Portugal and Italy.

Patricio ran for the Board of the Wikimedia Foundation in 2011. In July 2012 he joined the Wikimedia Foundation Board as a Chapters selected Trustee in 2012. He was re-selected on August 7, 2014, and served until August 2016.

In August 2014, he was elected Vice Chair of the Board. In July 2015 he was elected Chair of the Board. His term ended in June 2016.
