= Laurentum =

Ancient Roman city

Coordinates: 41°42′40″N 12°20′49″E

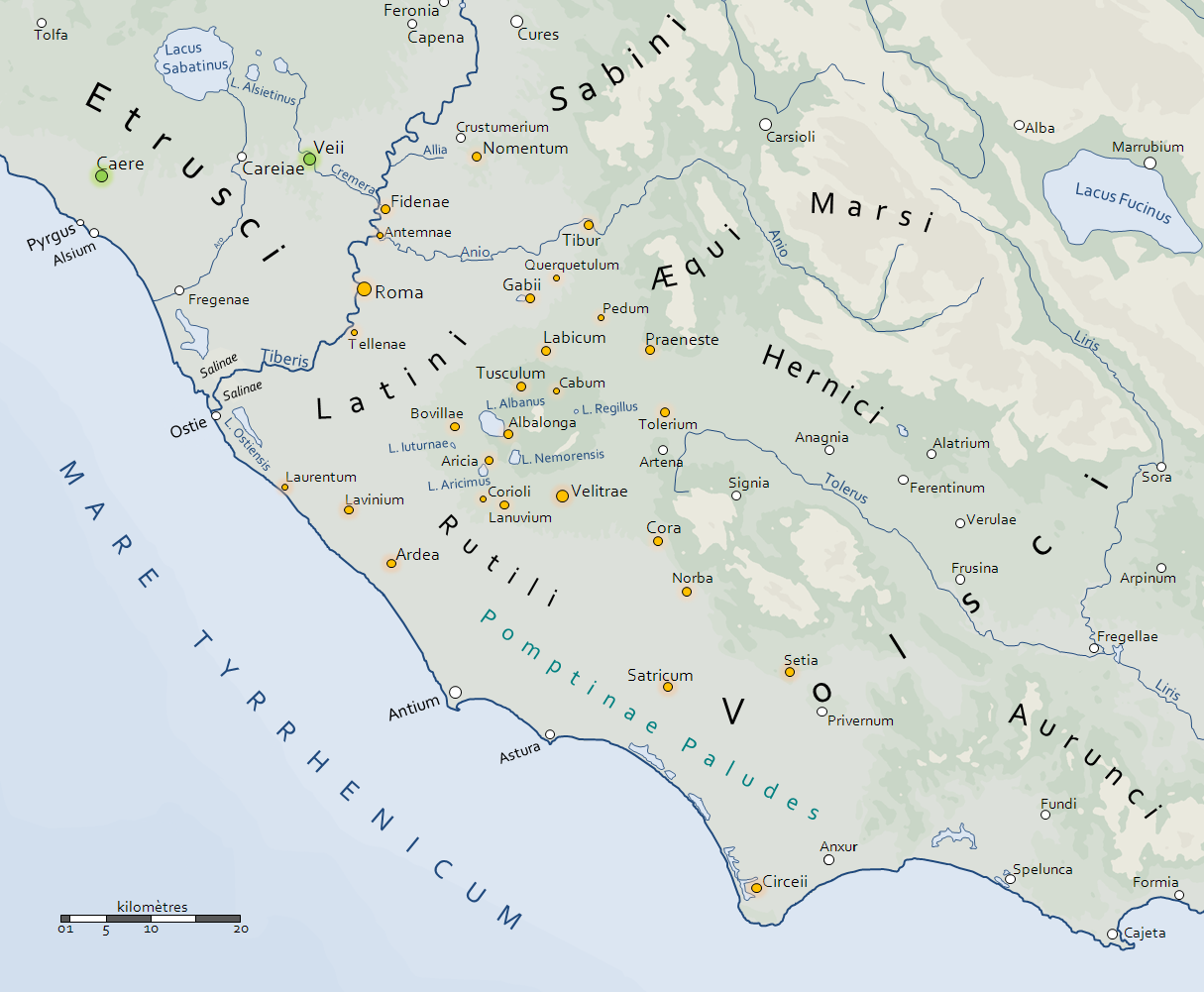
Laurentum on a map of Old Latium

Laurentum was an ancient Roman city of Latium situated between Ostia and Lavinium, on the west coast of the Italian Peninsula southwest of Rome. Roman writers regarded it as the original capital of Italy, before Lavinium assumed that role after the death of King Latinus. In historical times, Laurentum was united with Lavinium, and the name Lauro-Lavinium is sometimes used to refer to both.

== History ==
According to Livy, in the 8th century BC at the time when Romulus and Titus Tatius jointly ruled Rome, the ambassadors of the Laurentes came to Rome but were beaten by Tatius' relatives. The Laurentes complained; however, Tatius accorded more weight to the influence of his relatives than to the injury done the Laurentes. When Tatius afterwards visited Lavinium to celebrate an anniversary sacrifice, he was slain in a tumult. Romulus declined to go to war and instead renewed the treaty between Rome and Lavinium.

Under the Empire, Laurentum was the site of an imperial villa. Pliny the Younger also had a villa in the area described in detail in a letter to his friend Gallus.

== Etymology ==
The name Laurentum is either descended from many groves of Laurus nobilis (bay tree), or, according to Virgil, a single "sacred" laurel tree.

Laurentius (feminine Laurentia), meaning "someone from Laurentum" or "The one who wears a laurel wreath", was a common Roman given name.

According to Virgil's Aeneid, the city of Laurentum and its people the Laurentines gained the name because the laurel tree was Latinus' favourite.
