= Laura McLaughlin =

Laura McLaughlin may refer to:

- Laura Jean McLaughlin (born 1965), American ceramic sculptor, printmaker, and mosaic artist
- Laura H. McLaughlin (1893–1991), American astronomer
