= Laura Powers =

Laura Powers may refer to:

- Laura Powers (The Simpsons), a character from The Simpsons
- Laura Weidman Powers, American businesswoman
