= Laura Chapman =

Laura Chapman may refer to:

- Laura Wakim Chapman (born 1984), American politician, member of the West Virginia Senate
- Laura Hill Chapman (1935–2021), American art educator
- Laura Chapman Hruska (1935–2010), née Chapman, American lawyer, novelist, and co-founder of the Soho Press
- Laura Chapman, a character in the film The Day After Tomorrow, played by Emmy Rossum
