= Laura Boylan =

Laura Boylan may refer to:

- Laura Boylan (cricketer) (born 1991), Irish cricketer
- Laura S. Boylan, American neurologist
