= Laura Robinson =

Laura Robinson may refer to:

- Laura Robinson (journalist) (c. 1957), Canadian sports journalist and author
- Laura M. Robinson (c. 1957), Canadian actress, author, and game designer
- Laura Robinson (scientist) (born 1976), British professor of geochemistry
