= Laura Bridgewater =

American biologist

Laura Bridgewater is the associate academic vice president for faculty development at Brigham Young University (BYU). Previously she was the associate dean in the College of Life Sciences at BYU. Her research focused on the way stress affects gut microbiota in mice and genes involved with osteoarthritis and BMP2.

== Education and research ==
Bridgewater graduated from Brigham Young University in 1989 with a degree in microbiology. She received her Ph.D. in genetics from George Washington University in 1995 and completed her postdoctoral studies at M.D. Anderson Cancer Research Center in Houston, Texas, in 1999. She was the chair of the Department of Microbiology and Molecular Biology in the College of Life Sciences at Brigham Young University from 2011 to 2014, and associate dean in the College of Life Sciences 2016–2018.

Bridgewater's research focuses on bone and cartilage tissue in joints and the genes that could potentially cure osteoarthritis. She is also conducting research on mice and the effect of stress on gut microbiota. She found that the gut microbiota in female mice respond to stress in a way that is similar to the way they respond to a high-fat diet. One of her discoveries was a variant of BMP2 in the nucleus called nBMP2 which affects intercellular calcium transport, which can alter muscle function, memory and cell division, indicating possible ties to dementia and cancer. She has been published in academic journals including BMC Cell Biology and BioMed Research International and Scientific Reports.

== Personal life ==
Laura Bridgewater is married to Tim Bridgewater, a Utah Valley business man who ran for the United States Senate in 2010. They reside in Provo, UT and have four children. Laura is a member of the Church of Jesus Christ of Latter-day Saints.

== Awards ==
- Scholarship Award (2009), BYU Faculty Women's Association
- Outstanding Mentor Award (2008), BYU College of Life Sciences
- Young Scholar Award (2004), BYU
