= The Raven (runner) =

American runner

The Raven, born Robert Kraft, is a Miami Beach-based runner known for his fifty-year run streak that began on 1 January 1975. In March 2009, he reached 100,000 miles run and had run more than 140,000 as of 2022.

The Raven began running after a short stint as a songwriter. It was originally an eight-mile run, and as of November 2023 is now a five-mile run due to his age and health.

Raven, along with his streak and community of runners, are the subject of the 2017 book Running with Raven: The Amazing Story of One Man, His Passion, and the Community He Inspired, by Laura Lee Huttenbach.
