= Laura Pyrak-Nolte =

American geophysicist

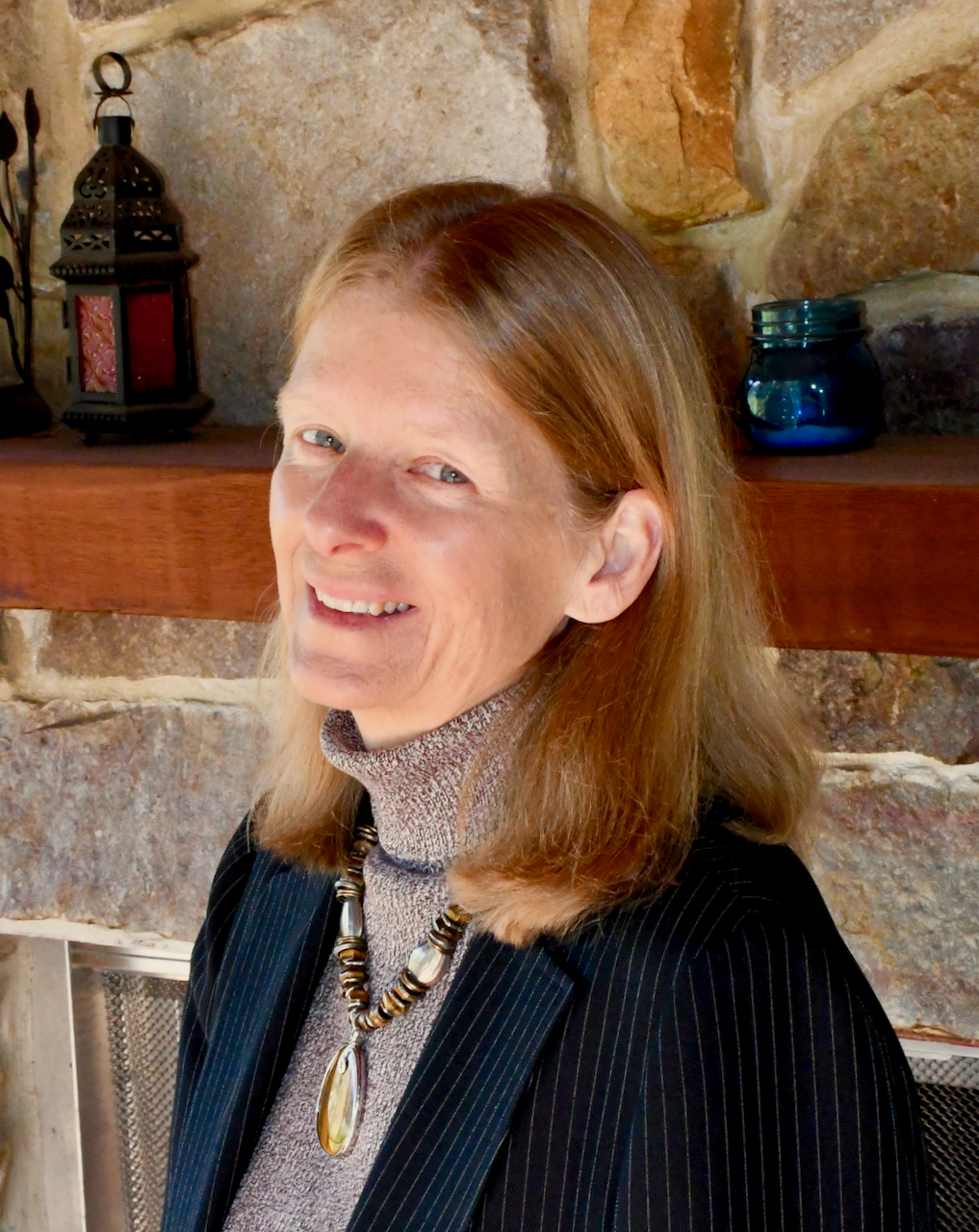
- Laura Pyrak-Nolte
- Education: University of California, Berkeley (PhD); Virginia Tech (MS); SUNY Buffalo (BS)
- Awards: Fellow of the International Society for Rock Mechanics (2025); Member of the American Academy of Arts and Sciences (2022); Member of the National Academy of Engineering (2021); Reginald Fessenden Award (2020); Fellow of the American Geophysical Union (2020); Fellow of the American Association for the Advancement of Science (2020)
- Scientific career
- Workplaces: Purdue University; University of Notre Dame
- Thesis: Seismic visibility of fractures (1988)
- Website: Rock Physics Research Group

Laura J. Pyrak-Nolte is an American geophysicist who is Distinguished Professor of Physics and Astronomy at Purdue University. She is the former President of the International Society of Porous Media and former President of the American Rock Mechanics Association. In 2020 Pyrak-Nolte was awarded the Society of Exploration Geophysicists Reginald Fessenden Award. She is a Fellow of the American Geophysical Union.

== Early life and education ==
After completing a BS in Engineering Science at SUNY Buffalo, Pyrak-Nolte was a graduate student at Virginia Polytechnic, where she studied rift basin geometry using refraction of isotherms with John K. Costain. Pyrak-Nolte completed her doctoral research at the University of California, Berkeley. There she worked on rock mechanics with Neville G. W. Cook. She was awarded various scholarships at Berkeley, including the Jane Lewis Fellowship and Thomas Dias Fellowship.

== Research and career ==
Pyrak-Nolte was appointed in 1992 as an assistant professor at the University of Notre Dame Department of Civil Engineering and Geological Sciences. She joined Purdue University in 1997, as an associate professor, was promoted to full professor in 2001, and was appointed as a Distinguished Professor of Physics and Astronomy in 2018.

Inspired by her early work in rock mechanics, Pyrak-Nolte continued to study mechanical discontinuities in rocks. The mechanical and hydraulic behaviour of rocks is determined by these discontinuities, and the formation of fractures within such rocks dictates the transport of water and gas through them. Her research considers the mechanisms that underpin seismic processes in complex fractures. She looks to understand the evolution of fractures, how seismic waves interact with fractures and how the geometry of fractures impacts the flow of fluids. She developed a function that describes the relationship between fluid flow and elastic stiffness. By combining fracture surface properties with the outputs of this function, Pyrak-Nolte can infer the fluid flow properties in fractured rock using only seismic data.

To better understand these fractures, Pyrak-Nolte makes use of 3D printing to create synthetic rock samples from a powder of bassanite. During the printing process the bassanite undergoes a chemical reaction with a water-based binder, forming a gypsum sample with precisely controlled internal structures. Pyrak-Nolte has shown that studying the fracture processes of synthetic rock can help to predict rocks in the real world.

== Academic service ==
Throughout her career Pyrak-Nolte has worked with the United States Department of Energy (DOE), as part of both the councils on Earth Sciences and Chemical Sciences, Geosciences and Biosciences. From 2017 to 2019 Pyrak-Nolte served as President of the American Rock Mechanics Association (ARMA). In 2018 Pyrak-Nolte was the first woman to deliver the annual International Society for Rock Mechanics and Rock Engineering online lecture in its thirty-year history. From 2019 to 2023 she is the Vice President of North America to the International Society for Rock Mechanics (ISRM). In 2019 she was elected President of the International Society for Porous Media.

== Awards and honours ==
- 1995 International Society of Rock Mechanics Schlumberger Lecture Award
- 2013 Elected Fellow of the American Rock Mechanics Association
- 2020 Society of Exploration Geophysicists Reginald Fessenden Award
- 2020 Elected Fellow of the American Geophysical Union
- 2020 Elected Fellow of the American Association for the Advancement of Science AAAS
- 2021 Elected Member of the National Academy of Engineering
- 2022 Elected Member of the American Academy of Arts and Sciences
- 2023 Dean's Award of Achievement, School of Engineering and Applied Sciences, University at Buffalo
- 2024 Clifford C. Furnas Memorial Award, University of Buffalo

== Selected publications ==
- Pyrak-Nolte, Laura J.; Myer, Larry R.; Cook, Neville G. W. (1990). "Transmission of seismic waves across single natural fractures". Journal of Geophysical Research: Solid Earth. 95 (B6): 8617–8638. Bibcode:1990JGR....95.8617P. doi:10.1029/JB095iB06p08617. ISSN 2156-2202.
- Pyrak-Nolte, Laura J.; Nolte, David D. (2016). "Approaching a universal scaling relationship between fracture stiffness and fluid flow". Nature Communications. 7 10663. Bibcode:2016NatCo...710663P. doi:10.1038/ncomms10663. PMC 4754337. PMID 26868649.
- Pyrak-Nolte, L. J.; Morris, J. P. (2000-01-01). "Single fractures under normal stress: The relation between fracture specific stiffness and fluid flow". International Journal of Rock Mechanics and Mining Sciences. 37 (1): 245–262. Bibcode:2000IJRMM..37..245P. doi:10.1016/S1365-1609(99)00104-5. ISSN 1365-1609.
- Pyrack-Nolte, L. J. (1987). "HYDRAULIC AND MECHANICAL PROPERTIES OF NATURAL FRACTURES IN LOW-PERMEABILITY ROCK".
- Pyrak-Nolte, Laura J.; Myer, Larry R.; Cook, Neville G. W. (1990). "Anisotropy in seismic velocities and amplitudes from multiple parallel fractures". Journal of Geophysical Research: Solid Earth. 95 (B7): 11345–11358. Bibcode:1990JGR....9511345P. doi:10.1029/JB095iB07p11345. ISSN 2156-2202.
- Pyrak-Nolte, Laura J.; Braverman, William; Nolte, Nicholas J.; Wright, Alan; Nolte, David D. (2020). "Probing complex geophysical geometries with chattering dust". Nature Communications. 11 (1): 5282. Bibcode:2020NatCo..11.5282P. doi:10.1038/s41467-020-19087-z. PMC 7572509. PMID 33077790.
- Nolte, D. D.; Pyrak-Nolte, L. J. (2022). "Monitoring fracture saturation with internal seismic sources and twin neural networks". Journal of Geophysical Research: Solid Earth. 127 (1) e2021JB023005. Bibcode:2022JGRB..12723005N. doi:10.1029/2021JB023005.
