= Laura Meschede =

German journalist

Laura Meschede is a German freelance journalist. She became known due to her rejection of the Helmut Schmidt Journalist Award, which is named after the former Federal Chancellor, but sponsored by the private company ING-DiBa.

== Life ==
Since finishing her studies in 2014 at German journalism school, Munich, she works as a journalist for various print media.

== Reporting ==
In 2018, she refused to accept the Helmut Schmidt Journalist Award with a speech proclaiming "This is a public relations event". Especially since there is no political foundation behind the award, she claimed that her credibility in her job as a journalist would suffer if she had accepted it. Meschede has been critical of banks and politics, stating that critical journalism had the task to illuminate the dark side of an establishment.

According to Meschede, she could not have afforded to write the awarding article "Die Mensch-Maschine" ("The Human Machine") without a stipend from the publisher, SZ-Magazin. She had worked for weeks at the crowdsourcing department Amazon Mechanical Turk of Amazon Web Services where around half a million people compete globally for small digital orders. For a few cents they do monotonous tasks that are still too complicated for machines like rating images or typing off receipts, and reported on poor pay, high pressure and loneliness.

== Awards ==
- 2016 Otto Brenner Award for critical journalism in "Kein Platz" ("No Room") published by taz
- 2018 Helmut Schmidt Journalist Award (declined)
- 2018 Willi-Bleicher-Preis
