= Laura Silberstein =

American psychologist, author

- Education: Yeshiva University
- Medical career
- Institutions: Ferkauf Graduate School of Psychology; Albert Einstein College of Medicine

Laura Silberstein is an American psychologist, psychotherapist and author.

== Education ==
Silberstein earned her doctorate in clinical psychology from the Ferkauf Graduate School of Psychology at Yeshiva University.

== Psychology ==
Silberstein is the founding director of The Center for Compassion Focused Therapy in New York. She specializes in evidence-based techniques for treating an array of psychological issues. She also trains therapists with CFT, ACT and DBT.

Silberstein is an assistant professor consultant at the Ferkauf School of Psychology and Albert Einstein College of Medicine. Her research interests consist of compassion-focused therapy, emotions, mindfulness and psychological flexibility. Her research on the fundamentals of Emotional Schema Theory was published in the International Journal of Cognitive Therapy.

== Works ==
- The ACT Practitioner's Guide to the Science of Compassion: Tools for Fostering Psychological Flexibility (2014) with Benjamin Schoendorff and Dennis Tirch
- Buddhist Psychology and Cognitive-Behavioral Therapy (2015) with Dennis Tirch, Russell L. Kolts
- How to Be Nice to Yourself: The Everyday Guide to Self Compassion: Effective Strategies to Increase Self-Love and Acceptance (2019)
- Experiencing ACT from the Inside Out: A Self-Practice/Self-Reflection Workbook for Therapists (2019) with Martin J. Brock, M. Joann Wright, R. Trent Codd and Dennis Tirch
