= Laura Huenneke =

American ecologist

Dr. Laura Huenneke is an American ecologist and former President of the Ecological Society of America. She is known for her research in public health in Arizona's Native American community, focusing on cancer prevention, invasive species, and desert ecosystems. Huenneke is the former Vice President for Research at Northern Arizona University where she continues her research studying the impact of biological diversity on ecosystems and teaching classes in Environmental Sciences. She has served on a variety of boards and review panels for ecological research journals and has received a number of awards and honors during her career as an ecologist.

== Career ==
After attending the University of Missouri-Columbia for her undergraduate studies in Biological Sciences, Huenneke attended Cornell University and received a Ph.D. in Ecology and Evolutionary Biology. From 1987 to 2003, she served as both a Regents Professor and the Biology Department Chair at New Mexico State University. In July 2003, she took on the position of Dean of the College of Arts and Sciences at Northern Arizona University where she has also served as Dean of the College of Engineering and Natural Sciences, Vice President for Research, Vice President for Academic Affairs, and a Professor of Environmental Science. Huenneke served as VP for Public Affairs for the Ecological Society of America from 2007 to 2010, and she served as President from 2018 to 2019. Huenneke has also been a board member for a number of non-profit organizations focusing on the history and preservation of nature. In 2019, she was selected as the Interim Director for the Museum of Northern Arizona after serving on the museum's board of trustees for several years.

== Research ==
In 2002, Huenneke and colleagues conducted a study evaluating changes in primary productivity in the Chihuahuan desert ecosystem as the result of desertification. This desert in New Mexico, USA which was once a flourishing grassland is now dominated by desert and shrubbery. This study found that desertification has ultimately altered the seasonality of primary productivity of this region. Huenneke and her colleagues determined that the peak of primary productivity in the Chihuahuan desert ecosystem had shifted from summer to early spring over many years as the result of desertification.

In 2013, Huenneke along with colleagues Robert Trotter II, Kelly Laurila, and David Alberts, conducted a study in order to reduce the high failure rate of community-university partnerships focused on reducing health disparities in underrepresented populations. During this study, Huenneke and colleagues created a partnership for Native American Cancer Prevention (NACP) which was focused on conducting cancer and cancer prevention research in Native American communities. This study implemented a model which acknowledged the cultural and structural differences that exist between community members and university researchers especially in studies focusing on minority populations. This model proved to be a successful innovation for university research that relies on community engagement from minority groups in order to reduce health disparities.

== Legacy ==
1. "Desertification alters patterns of aboveground net primary production in Chihuahuan ecosystems" (2002-2003)
2. "Key Strategies for Building Research Capacity of University Faculty Members" (2017)
