= Laura Weidman Powers =

American businessperson

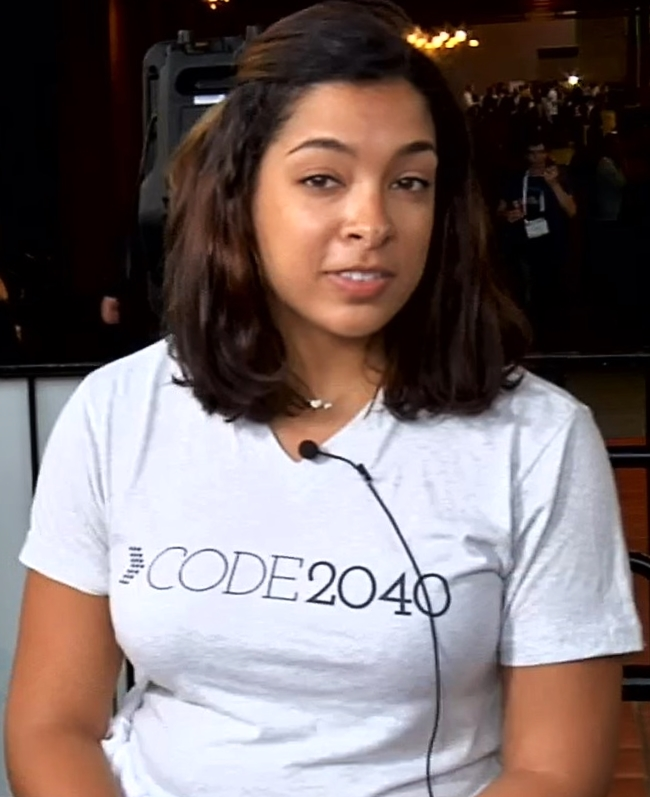
Powers interviewed in 2012

Laura Weidman Powers is a partner at Base10 Partners, the former CEO of the technology industry diversity organization Code2040 and formerly worked at White House Office of Science and Technology Policy during the Barack Obama administration.

== Early life ==
Powers grew up in Manhattan and attended Hunter College High School. Her father is the famous librettist John Weidman and her mother is Lila Coleburn, a clinical psychologist. Her paternal grandfather is Jerome Weidman, the Pulitzer prize winning novelist and playwright.

With a Black mother and a white father and surrounded by the diversity of her city and her school, she grew to appreciate the value of diversity at an early age. She told an interviewer in 2016, "You see everything in New York. You see wealth. You see poverty. You see the best and the worst of society. You see people from all backgrounds. You hear every language being spoken on a daily basis. It’s just such a multicultural upbringing, that I think it really shaped my view of what the world can or should look like."

== Education ==
Powers attended Harvard University, her father John Weidman's alma mater, and then attended law school and the Graduate School of Business at Stanford University, where she met her Code2040 cofounder Tristan Walker.

== Career ==
Weidman Powers started a West Philadelphia nonprofit arts education organization. She also started a tutoring company. She joined a technology startup company as Vice President of Product.

After working at the tech startup for two years, Powers cofounded Code2040 with Tristan Walker.

In late 2016, she spent six months as a member of the White House Office of Science and Technology Policy, focusing on increasing diversity and inclusion in the technology industry.
