= Okokume =

Spanish artist

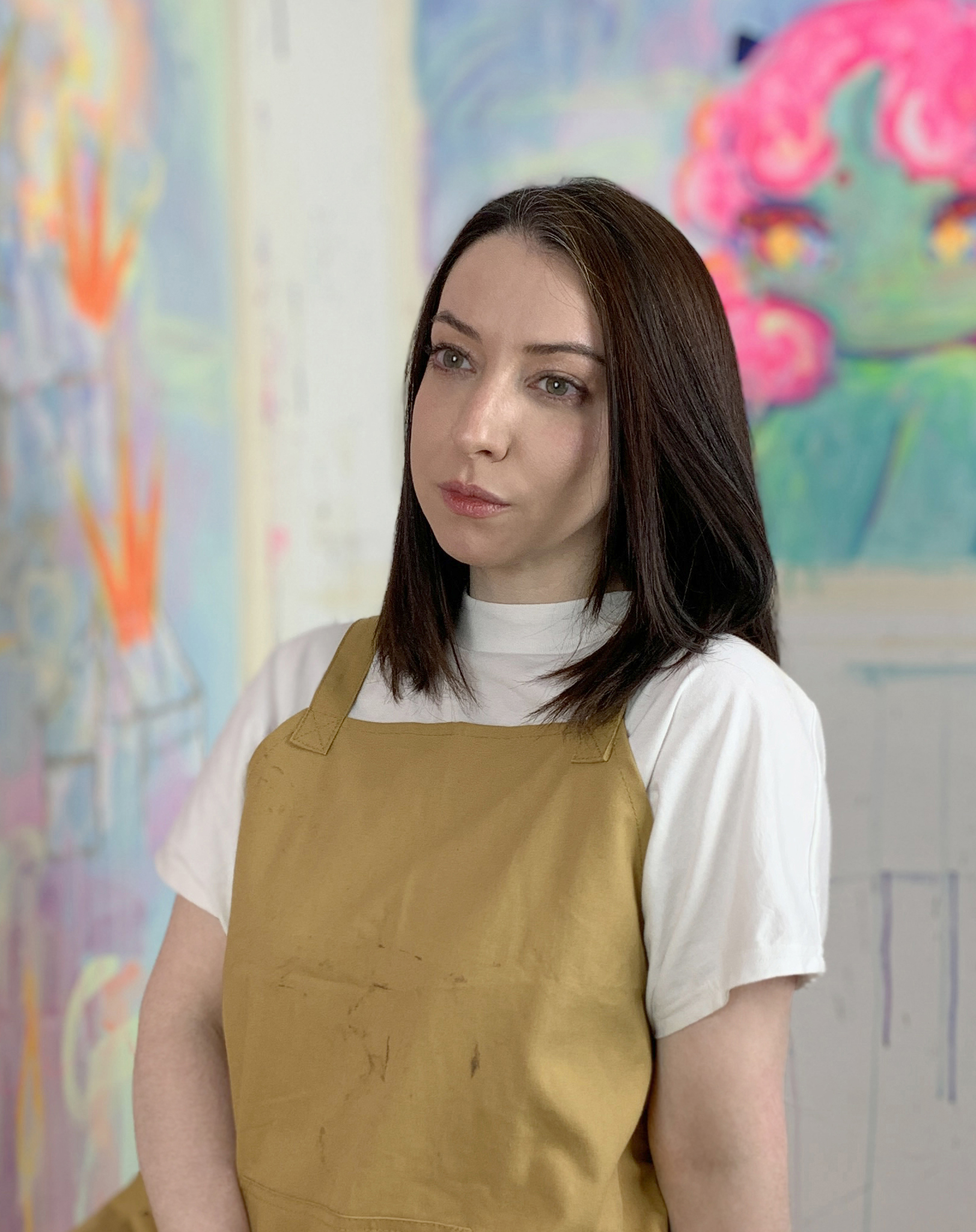
- Okokume in her studio
- Born: Laura Mas; July 27, 1985 (age 40); Mataró, Barcelona, Spain
- Education: Escola de la Llotja
- Known for: Her character "Cosmic Girl"

Laura Mas Hernandez, known professionally as Okokume, is a Spanish contemporary artist. She is recognized for her character "Cosmic Girl," which features in many of her works.

== Life and career ==
=== Academic background and early career ===
Okokume was born in 1985 and raised in Mataró, Barcelona. In 2010, she earned a degree in Advertising Graphic Design from Llotja School of Art and Design, Barcelona.

=== Lowbrow and Cosmic Girl ===
Okokume gradually started to work in a lowbrow style coupled with contemporary street styles, reflecting her passion for Japanese manga. In response to various struggles and concerns about the environment Okokume faced, she created Cosmic Girl, a pink-haired, turquoise-skinned spirit, who conveys the importance of protecting the environment and brings attention to various social causes.

=== Collaborations ===
In August 2019, Okokume opened Cosmic Girl Café, a collaborative project with artist Kasing Lung, in Harajuku, Tokyo. The opening of the café was held concurrently with the two artists’ collaborative exhibition, The Monsters, and the Cosmic Stars, in JPS Gallery Tokyo.

In January 2023, the artist launched two successful collaborations. The first one was with the mobile case and accessory brand Casetify. Under the name "Our Feelings".

== Books ==
- "The Arrival of Cosmic Girl" (La llegada de Cosmic Girl), 2018.

== Selected articles ==
- Harper's Bazzar Hong Kong, 2018
- Hypebeast, 2018
- MilK Magazine, 2018
- Esquire Hong Kong, 2020
- Diari Ara, 2021
- Ecos de Asia, 2021
- Art and Piece, 2021
- Yorokobu, 2022
- Trendy Style, 2022
- El Periódico de Aragon, 2022
