= Laura J. Balcer =

American neuro-ophthalmologist

Laura Joan Balcer is an American neuro-ophthalmologist who is the vice chair of the neurology department at the New York University Grossman School of Medicine.

== Life ==
Balcer received her high school diploma from Dulaney High School in 1983. She earned a Bachelors of Science in Biology in 1987 from the College of William and Mary. Balcer received an M.D. from Johns Hopkins University School of Medicine in 1991. Dr. Balcer completed her residency in neurology at the University of Pennsylvania in 1995 and completed her fellowship in Neuro-Ophthalmology in 1996 also at the University of Pennsylvania. Dr. Balcer completed her Masters of Science in Epidemiology at the University of Pennsylvania in 2000. Dr. Balcer practices as a board certified physician with the American Board of Psychiatry & Neurology.

Balcer specializes in treating patients with vision problems related to changes in the brain. Her contribution to research has encouraged the inclusion of vision testing for concussion assessments, which helps determine how the visual pathways in the brain are affected by head injuries. One such vision test, called the King-Devick (K-D) test, is used in youth and collegiate sports to quickly judge the likelihood of concussions. Other recognitions she's received include Super Doc, Top Doctors: New York Metro Area, the Barancik Prize for Innovation in Multiple Sclerosis, and CMS Stage 1 EHR in 2012 and 2013.
