= Laura Rajnović Evetović =

Serbian politician

Laura Rajnović Evetović (Serbian Cyrillic: Лаура Рајновић Еветовић; born 1 June 1975) is a politician and administrator in Serbia. She served in the Assembly of Vojvodina from 2012 to 2020.

== Private career ==
Rajnović Evetović is a graduated economist. She lives in Subotica and is the chief of the city's communal police.

== Politician ==
=== Municipal politics ===
Rajnović Evetović entered political life as a member of the far-right Serbian Radical Party, receiving the third position on the party's electoral list for Subotica in the 2004 Serbian local elections. The list won nine seats, and she was chosen for a mandate. (From 2000 to 2011, mandates in Serbian elections held under proportional representation were given to successful parties and coalitions rather than individual candidates, and it was common practice for the mandates to be assigned out of numerical order. Rajnović Evetović did not automatically receive a mandate by virtue of her list position, but she was awarded a seat in the assembly all the same.)

For the 2008 local elections in Subotica, the Radicals formed an electoral alliance with the Socialist Party of Serbia and the Democratic Party of Serbia. Rajnović Evetović was given the fifth position on their combined list and was again selected for a mandate after the list won thirteen seats. She was also included in the Radical Party's lists in the concurrent 2008 Serbian parliamentary election and 2008 Vojvodina provincial election, although she did not receive a mandate in either instance.

The Radical Party experienced a serious split later in 2008, with several members joining the more moderate Progressive Party under the leadership of Tomislav Nikolić and Aleksandar Vučić. Rajnović Evetović sided with the Progressives. She did not seek re-election at the local level in 2012.

=== Assembly of Vojvodina ===
Serbia's electoral law was reformed in 2011, such that mandates were awarded in numerical order to candidates on successful lists. Rajnović Evetović was given the sixth position on the Progressive Party's Let's Get Vojvodina Moving list in the 2012 provincial election and was elected when the list won fourteen mandates. The election was won by the Democratic Party and its allies, and the Progressives served in opposition for the next four years. Rajnović Evetović was active with the women's parliamentary network during this time.

She was given the forty-third position on the Progressive list for the 2016 provincial election and was re-elected when the list won a majority victory with sixty-three out of 120 mandates. She served for the next four years as a government supporter and was not a candidate for re-election in 2020.
