= Laura Honey =

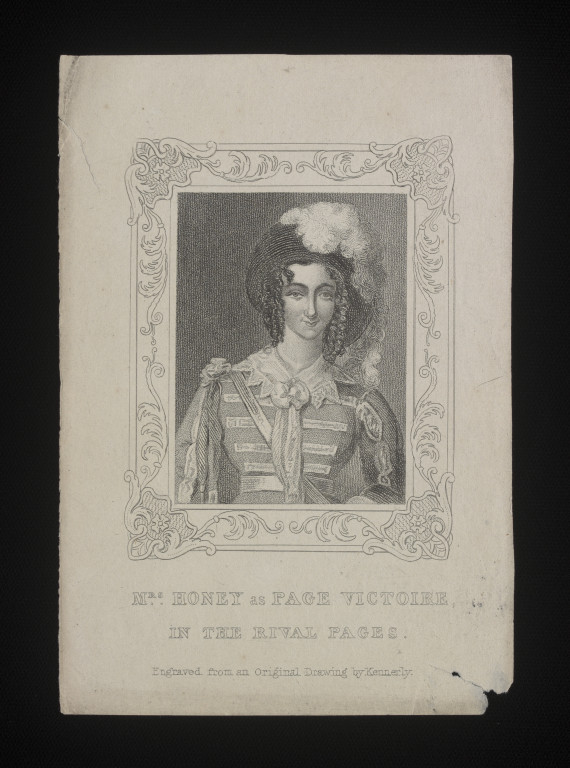
- Laura Honey as Page Victoire in "The Rival Page"
- Born: Lauretta Martha Rosier Bell; 6 December 1816; United Kingdom
- Died: 1 April 1843 (aged 26); Regent's Park, London, England, United Kingdom
- Occupation(s): Actress; Singer
- Years active: 1826–1842

Laura Honey (6 December 1816 – 1 April 1843), born Lauretta Martha Rosier Bell, was a British actress, dancer and singer. Honey was born out of wedlock to an actress, and she joined her mother performing at the Olympic Theatre, and then performed at other London theatres as a child. As an adult, she continued to perform in many of the major London theatres and on tour. For a time, she managed the City of London Theatre. Her adult career lasted only a decade, as she died at the age of 26.

== Life and career ==
Honey was born out of wedlock to a singer and actress, Anne Bell (died 1861). Her mother married John Young in 1823. The two produced John William Young (born 1831) and Fanny Young, an actress (1834–1860). Honey's mother performed at Sadler's Wells in the 1820s, where Honey helped with wardrobe and played in juvenile roles under the name Laura Bell. Her mother began working at the Olympic Theatre in 1826, and Honey joined her mother there. Honey performed in Bayle Bernard's play "Casco Bay" in 1827. Honey then moved to the Surrey Theatre and took music lessons. She returned to Sadler's Wells in 1929.

In 1831, she married William Honey. The two had a daughter (Laura Dalton Honey, 1834–1884), but he took advantage of her finances, and they divorced. William drowned in 1836 in a boating accident on the Thames River. She later married Ernest Gaston, who wrote songs, and the two had another child (Ada, born c. 1839), but she continued to perform as Laura Honey.

Honey performed at the Royal Strand Theatre in 1832 in Loves of the Angels by Leman Rede. The following year, she performed at the Queen's Theatre and Prince of Wales Theatre. Next, she performed at the Adelphi Theatre. She performed as Psyche in a burlesque called "Cupid" opposite John Reeve. After a season at the Haymarket Theatre she toured in Britain. Other West End theatres where she played included the St James's and the Olympic, before she took over the management of the City of London Theatre. She played Tom Tug in The Waterman, Myrtilla in Planché's adaptation of "Riquet with the Tuft" and also performed in Spirit of the Rhine by Morris Barnett, in which she popularised "My Beautiful Rhine".

== Death ==
Honey died of "inflammation" in 1843, at the age of 26, in the Regent's Park area of London, leaving two young children. She was buried at the Christ Church, Hampstead.

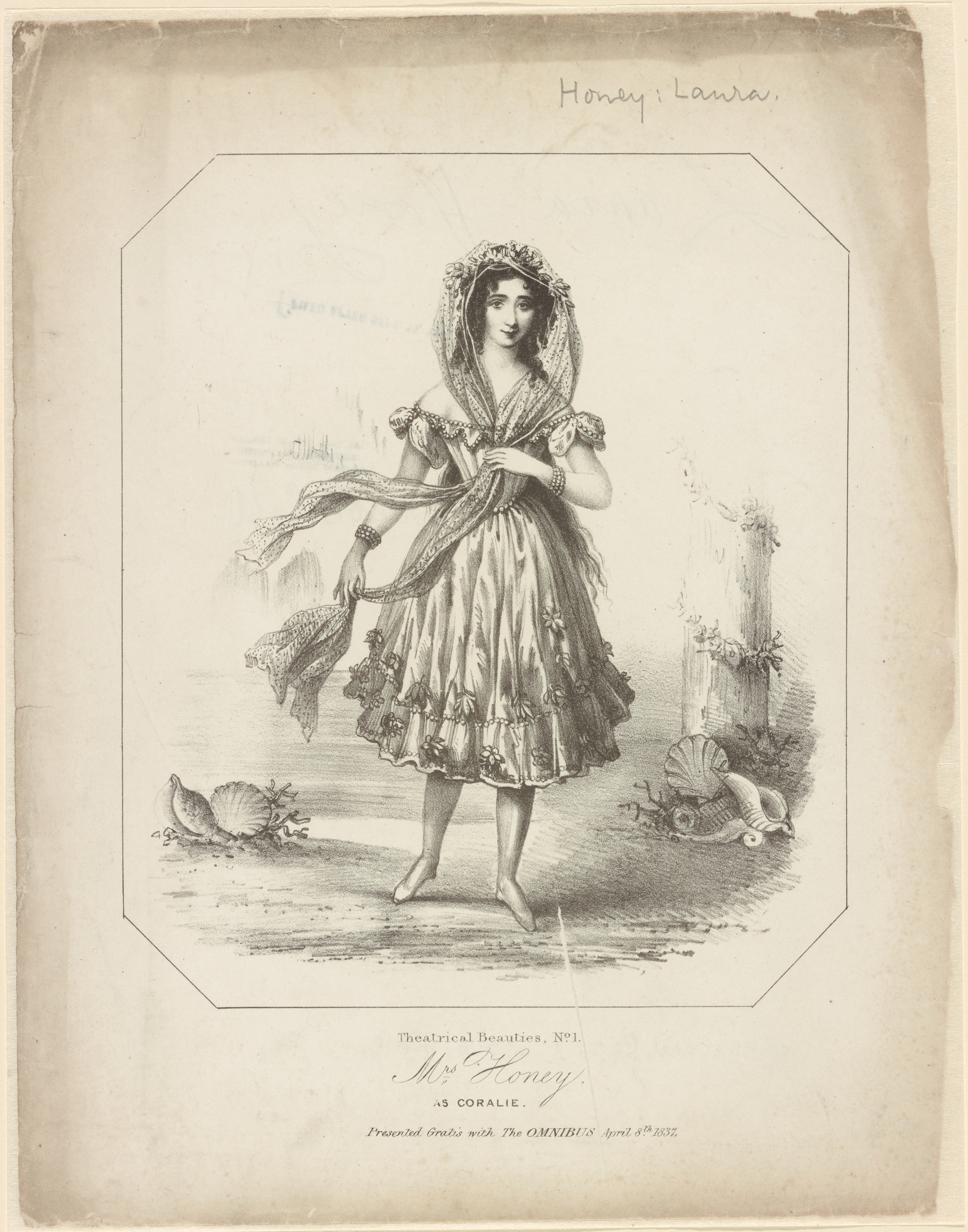
Laura Honey as Coralie

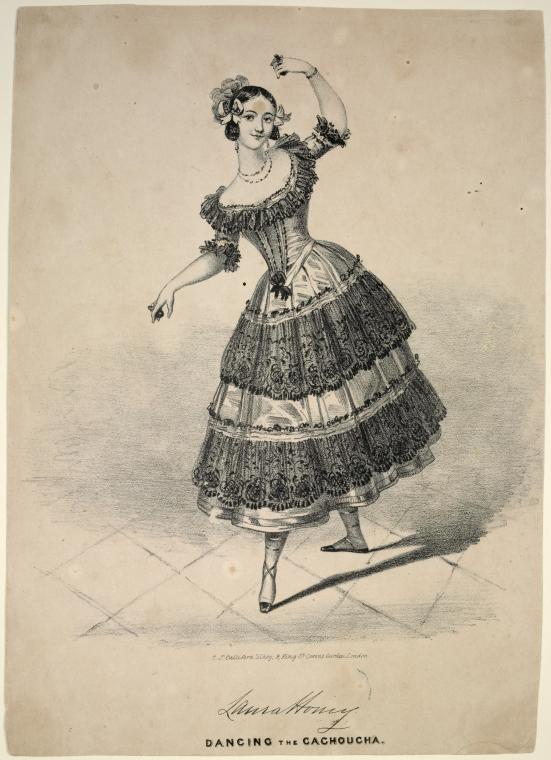
Laura Honey dancing the Cachoucha

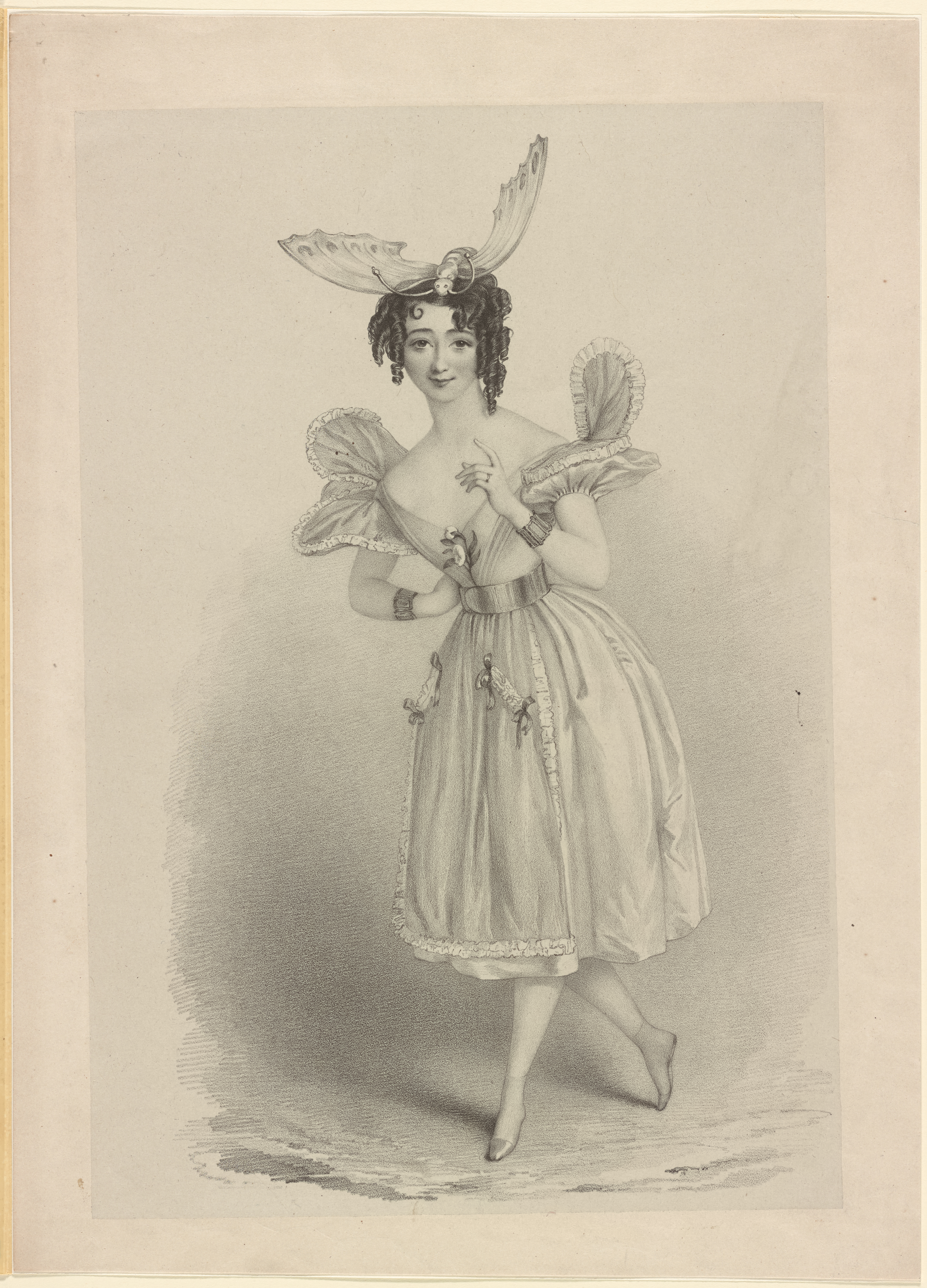
Laura Honey as Psyche
