= Laura Alho =

Finnish blogger

- Born: Finland
- Occupations: Travel blogger Writer
- Employer: Royal Commission for Al-'Ula
- Children: 2
- Father: Hannu Alho
- Website: www.blueabaya.com

Laura Alho is a Finnish-origin, Riyadh-based travel blogger, writer and photographer. She is the founder of Blue Abaya, the first travel blog in Saudi Arabia, which she launched in 2010. Her work as a writer and photographer has been published in various magazines and media outlets, including National Geographic, Saudi Gazette and Arab News. She is also the first European woman to have received her driving license in Saudi Arabia.

== Early life and career ==
After completing her graduation, Laura started working as a nurse in her home country. She wanted to become a wildlife photographer as a child and study Egyptology but ended up in the medical field. She moved to Saudi Arabia in 2008 on a short-term assignment. She started blogging as a hobby, but travel writing became a full-time job.

In 2010, she launched her website called Blue Abaya, when she witnessed a lack of channels informing people about tourism in Saudi Arabia. The name Blue Abaya came from the blue color of Finland's flag and Abaya, a full-length outer garment worn by women in Saudi Arabia. The website was started with the purpose of promoting Saudi tourism and heritage sites to audiences worldwide. The website garnered millions of views from across the world.

Her blog has won several blog awards, including Best Saudi Arabia Expat Blog 2012, Best Asian & Middle Eastern Weblog 2013 at The Weblog Awards (Bloggies).

In 2014, Ahlo was a finalist in the Saudi Excellence in Tourism Awards (SETA) as the best website promoting tourism. In 2017, she was named one of the top 10 most influential expats residing in the Arab world who brought positive change. In 2021, Laura was named 'Travel Media Influencer of the Year' at The Wanderlust Travel Awards by Wanderlust magazine.

Laura Alho has written guidebooks and travel guides about Saudi Arabia and also has authored two books, Ultimate Guide to Edge of the World and Guide to Secret Lake in Riyadh. She works in the marketing department of the Royal Commission for Al-'Ula (RCU).

== Personal life ==
She is married to a Saudi with whom she has two kids.
