= Laura Bennet =

New Zealand academic

Laura Bennet FRSNZ
- Education: University of Auckland
- Scientific career
- Fields: Foetal physiology
- Workplaces: University of Auckland
- Thesis: Peptides and the control of fetal breathing movements (1989)

Laura Bennet FRSNZ is a New Zealand academic, and as of 2019 is a full professor at the University of Auckland. She was elected a Fellow of the Royal Society Te Apārangi in March 2022.

== Academic career ==
After a 1989 PhD titled 'Peptides and the control of fetal breathing movements' at the University of Auckland, Bennet joined staff, rising to full professor.

Bennet is a foetal physiology expert and her most important work has been on therapeutic hypothermia.

Bennet was elected a Fellow of the Royal Society Te Apārangi in 2022. The society said that Bennet "is noted for her original discoveries in preterm fetal physiology and pathophysiology, leading to key new knowledge about how babies adapt to adverse challenges such as oxygen deprivation and infection".

== Selected works ==
- Gunn, Alistair J., Laura Bennet, Mark I. Gunning, Peter D. Gluckman, and Tania R. Gunn. "Cerebral hypothermia is not neuroprotective when started after postischemic seizures in fetal sheep." Pediatric research 46, no. 3 (1999): 274.
- Mellor, David J., Tamara J. Diesch, Alistair J. Gunn, and Laura Bennet. "The importance of ‘awareness’ for understanding fetal pain." Brain research reviews 49, no. 3 (2005): 455-471.
- Robertson, Nicola J., Sidhartha Tan, Floris Groenendaal, Frank Van Bel, Sandra E. Juul, Laura Bennet, Matthew Derrick et al. "Which neuroprotective agents are ready for bench to bedside translation in the newborn infant?." The Journal of pediatrics 160, no. 4 (2012): 544–552.
- Davidson, Joanne O., Colin R. Green, Louise F. B. Nicholson, Simon J. O'carroll, Mhoyra Fraser, Laura Bennet, and Alistair Jan Gunn. "Connexin hemichannel blockade improves outcomes in a model of fetal ischemia." Annals of neurology 71, no. 1 (2012): 121–132.
