= Laura Vanderkam =

American author

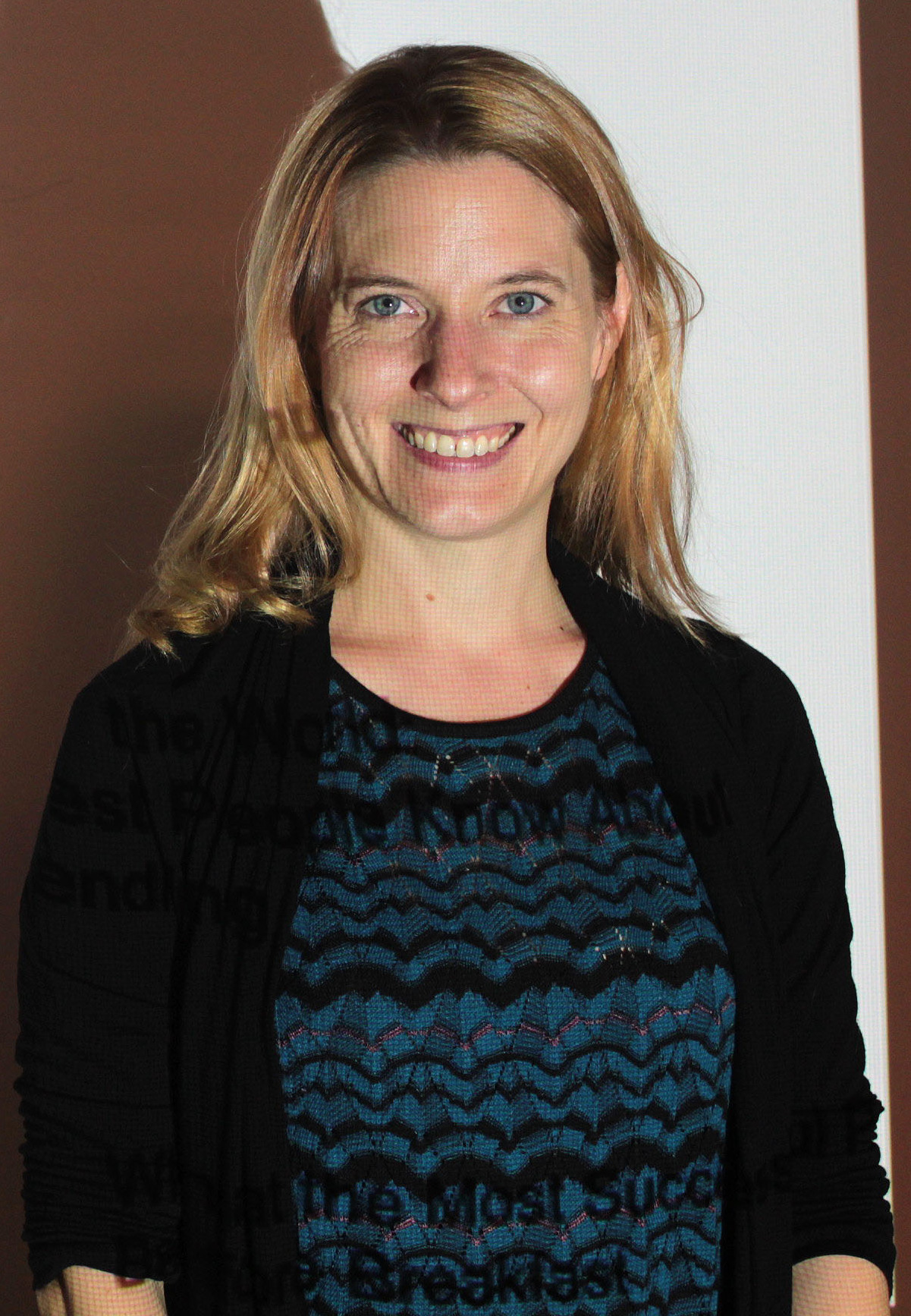
Vanderkam at the Bullish Conference in 2013

Laura Vanderkam (born 1978) is an American author, speaker and blogger known for her expertise in time management.

== Education ==
Vanderkam is a 2001 graduate of Princeton University.

== Career ==
Vanderkam became interested in time management while working as a journalist, when she interviewed accomplished people who juggled busy schedules. In October 2016, she presented a TED talk called "How to gain control of your free time". She has written for Fortune, USA Today, Redbook, The Wall Street Journal, and The New York Times. She hosts the Before Breakfast podcast and co-hosts the Best of Both Worlds podcast with Sarah Hart-Unger. Her advice to parents includes the quote: "Going to bed early is how grown-ups sleep in".

== Books ==
- Genius Denied: How to Stop Wasting Our Brightest Young Minds (With Bob Davidson and Jan Davidson), Simon & Schuster, 2004.
- The Healthy Guide to Unhealthy Living: How to Survive Your Bad Habits (With David Clayton), Simon & Schuster, 2006.
- 168 Hours: You Have More Time Than You Think, Portfolio, 2010.
- What the Most Successful People do Before Breakfast: A Short Guide to Making Over Your Mornings--and Life, Portfolio/Penguin, 2012.
- All the Money in the World: What the Happiest People Know About Getting and Spending, Portfolio/Penguin, 2013.
- Off the Clock: Feel Less Busy While Getting More Done, Portfolio, 2018.
- I Know How She Does It: How Successful Women Make The Most of Their Time, Portfolio/Penguin, 2019.
- Juliet's School of Possibilities: A Little Story About the Power of Priorities, Portfolio, 2019.
- The New Corner Office: How The Most Successful People Work From Home, Portfolio, 2020.
- Tranquility by Tuesday: 9 Ways to Calm the Chaos and Make Time for What Matters, Portfolio, 2022.

== Personal life ==
Vanderkam and her husband have five children and a dog. They live outside Philadelphia. Her hobbies are running, playing the piano, and singing in her church choir.
