= Laura Linnan =

American academic

Laura Linnan is the Senior Associate Dean for Academic and Student Affairs and a professor of Health Behavior at the UNC Gillings School of Global Public Health. She is also the founding director at the Carolina Collaborative for Research on Work and Health (CCRWH).

She has been Associate Dean since 2016 and as such, is the chief academic officer at Gillings “overseeing the curriculum for more than 70 degree programs at the undergraduate, and graduate levels. She is also responsible for the appointments, promotion and tenure process for more than 230 Gillings faculty members on both tenure and fixed term tracks.”

== Education ==
- ScD, Public Health, Harvard University, 1999
- MSEd, Public Health, University of Toledo, 1983
- BS, Health Education, Indiana State University, 1981

== Publications ==
- Comprehensive approach to planning public health programs and policies. In Boulton, M : Maxcy-Rosenau-Last. (Eds.), Public Health and Preventive Medicine, 16th Edition. Linnan, L. and Leff, M. (2019). Mc-Graw-Hill Inc..
- The Health and Working Conditions of Women Employed in Child Care. L Linnan, G Arandia, L Bateman, A Vaughn, N Smith, D Ward (2017). International journal of environmental research and public health, 14(3).
- Fidelity and its relationship to implementation, adaptation, and dissemination. In: Brownson R., Colditz G., and E.Proctor. (Eds). Dissemination and Implementation Research in Health: Translating Science into Practice, 2nd edition. Dacey-Allen, J., Shelton, R., Emmons, K. and Linnan, L. (2017). Oxford University Press.
- Results of the Workplace Health in America Survey, chosen by the American Journal of Health Promotion (AJHP) as the Editor-in-Chief Paper of the Year for 2019 and one of nine on the “Best of 2019 List.”
- Results of caring and reaching for health (CARE): a cluster-randomized controlled trial assessing a worksite wellness intervention for child care staff
