= Laura Rhoney =

Laura Rhoney is a Scottish ten-pin bowler. She finished in 4th position of the combined rankings at the 2006 AMF World Cup. During the final round she finished in 5th position. She started the tournament in style by becoming the first 300 game of the tournament in the third game of the women's first block, it was her second career 300 game. She was only the sixth ever female player to achieve this on a World Cup event. In May 2015 Rhoney married Rebecca Laird and now lives with her and her son Hayden. Laura's mum has been in hospital numerous times, with the most memorable being when her mum had a stroke on a flight coming back from Laura's honeymoon in Orlando.
