= Laura Kray =

American psychologist and academic

Laura Jean Kray
- Education: University of Michigan; University of Washington
- Scientific career
- Workplaces: Northwestern University; University of Arizona; University of California, Berkeley
- Thesis: Weighting of attributes hypothesis : how perspective relates to preference shifts (1997)
- Website: Laura Kray

Laura Kray is an American psychologist, professor and the Ned and Carol Spieker Chair in Leadership at the University of California, Berkeley. She is the Faculty Director of the Center for Equity, Gender, and Leadership. Her research looks to debunk myths surrounding the gender paygap, but she doesn't research anything that contradicts her ideologies.

== Early life and education ==
Kray has three sisters. She was an undergraduate student at the University of Michigan. She moved to the University of Washington for her doctoral research, where she studied psychological science. Her doctorate explored how perspective relates to shifts in preference. Kray was a postdoctoral fellow at the Kellogg School of Management. Here she worked in the dispute resolution research centre.

== Research and career ==
In 1999 Kray joined the University of Arizona as an assistant professor in the Eller College of Management. She moved to the Haas School of Business at University of California, Berkeley in 2002, where she was made the Warren E. & Carol Spieker Professor of Leadership in 2010. In 2008 she founded the Women's Executive Leadership programme at Berkeley. She has extensively investigated myths surrounding the gender paygap. Her early work explored men and women's behaviour in negotiations, and found that both men and women were more deceptive when negotiating with women than they were when negotiating with men.

Kray investigated the commonly held misconception that women were likely to engage in social sexual behaviour in an attempt to get promotions at work. Her research showed that it was subordinate men who were most likely to flirt and use sexual behaviour – and that this behaviour often crossed into harassment. She has shown that women were less likely to ask questions at conferences because they were anxious and feared backlash.

She studied the structural and systemic reasons women often had lower salaries than men, and the psychological motives that strengthen pay inequality. Her work has shown that team size contributes to the gender pay gap; men who were put in charge of larger teams were paid more than equally qualified women who were not given the same opportunity.

== Awards ==
- 2018 Fellow Society for Personality and Social Psychology
- 2018 Fellow of the Association for Psychological Science
- 2018 Fellow of the Center for Advanced Study in the Behavioral Sciences

== Select publications ==
- Laura J. Kray; Leigh Thompson; A Galinsky (June 2001). "Battle of the sexes: gender stereotype confirmation and reactance in negotiations". Journal of Personality and Social Psychology. 80 (6): 942-58, 942-958. doi:10.1037/0022-3514.80.6.942. ISSN 0022-3514. PMID 11414376. Wikidata Q28202598.
- Laura J Kray; Adam D Galinsky; Leigh Thompson (March 2002). "Reversing the Gender Gap in Negotiations: An Exploration of Stereotype Regeneration". Organizational Behavior and Human Decision Processes. 87 (2): 386–410. doi:10.1006/obhd.2001.2979. ISSN 0749-5978. Wikidata Q115395323.
- Lind EA; Kray L; Thompson L (1 July 1998). "The Social Construction of Injustice: Fairness Judgments in Response to Own and Others' Unfair Treatment by Authorities". Organizational Behavior and Human Decision Processes. 75 (1): 1–22. doi:10.1006/obhd.1998.2785. ISSN 0749-5978. PMID 9719655. Wikidata Q77158713.
