= Laura Zúñiga Cáceres =

Honduran human rights and indigenous rights activist

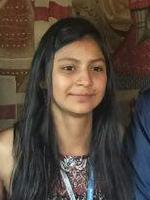
Laura Zúñiga Cáceres

Laura Zúñiga Cáceres is a Honduran human rights and indigenous rights activist.

She is a member of the Civic Council of Popular and Indigenous Organizations of Honduras and Hagamos Lo Imposible. She appeared before the Organization of American States Human Rights Commission. and at the 2019 United Nations Climate Change Conference. She appeared at a rally against Trans-Pacific Partnership at the 2016 Democratic National Convention

She is the daughter of activist Berta Caceres, who was assassinated in 2016.
