= Murder of Laura Law =

1940 murder in Washington, United States

Coordinates: 46.982629°N 123.808319°W

Lea Laura Luoma Law (January 20, 1914 – January 5, 1940), a Finnish immigrant to the US, was the wife of militant labor leader Richard Law. She was mysteriously murdered on January 5, 1940. The case is still unsolved.

Laura Law was found murdered in her house at 1117 East 2nd Street in Aberdeen, Washington by her parents. She was bludgeoned with an axe, and her skull was caved in. The murder happened so quietly that Law's toddler son was found sleeping in the next room when her mother found her corpse. There are many suspicions as to who killed her and for what reasons. Richard Law was one of the suspects, even though he was at a union meeting at the time of the murder.

Richard Shelton Law, a communist and labor activist, claimed that the murder happened when government agents were caught by Laura looking for evidence for the House Un-American Activities Committee (HUAC). Other stories claim that communists from the Soviet Union killed her because of what she might have known about the then-ongoing Winter War (1939–1940).

The story of Laura Law's murder reveals the political and ethnic atmosphere of Aberdeen, Washington, during the 1940s, characterized as a "hotbed of labor strife." The division between White Finns and Red Finns and the different European ethnicities living in Aberdeen are highlighted because of this. The labor struggles of the area also come to light, as there was a struggle between the American Federation of Labor's unions and the Congress of Industrial Organizations' unions; union and non-union workers; and local businesses and striking workers. Richard Law purported that his wife's murder could have been carried out by the Aberdeen Business Builders, an anti-union, right-wing group, as a threat to him or for retaliation.

== Fiction ==
In 1949, Murray Morgan wrote the book, The Viewless Winds, a fictitious novel based on the events surrounding the Laura Law murder. In Morgan's book, the murder is carried out by a vagrant as a random act of violence. The murder then sets in motion a mass hysteria which brings out the worst in the people of the small Northwest coastal town the story is set in.

== See also ==
- Jake Bird, convicted of killing two women with an axe in Tacoma, Washington in 1947, and who claimed to have killed an additional 44 people
