= Laura Londén =

Finnish Swede diplomat

Laura Londén (b. 1961) is a Finnish Swede diplomat, who works as the UN Assistant Secretary-General and the deputy executive director (management) of the United Nations Population Fund (UNFPA). She began in these posts in December 2015, and she is responsible for developing the organization of UNFPA. She was preceded as the Assistant Secretary-General by the Danish Anne-Birgitte Albrectsen.

Londén studied political science at Åbo Akademi in Turku. She graduated in 1988, majoring in public law and public administration theory. Her master's thesis was entitled “Asylrätt och flyktingar i Finland — med speciell hänsyn till beviljande av asyl och omhändertagande av flyktingar” (‘Right of asylum and refugees in Finland — with special attention to the granting of asylum and taking care of refugees’). After graduation she worked for a few months in the Malax municipality in Ostrobothnia, as the secretary of refugee affairs, organizing things for Vietnamese refugees. After that she has been employed for 25 years in the service of the UN. She has worked with refugee affairs, peacekeeping and administration.

Londén has worked in the headquarters and field offices of several UN organizations, e.g. in New York City, Sierra Leone, Israel, Bosnia, East Timor, Croatia, Switzerland, Austria, and Liberia. During 2010–2015 she lived in Jordan. During 2012–2015 she worked there as the director of human resources at UNRWA, in which capacity she had 32 000 subordinates.

During 2004–2006 she worked in administrational duties in Sierra Leone, after which she was director of logistics for UNRWA peace keeping functions. During 2007–2012 she worked as the Agency's Director of Administrative Support from 2007 to 2012, during which time she also concurrently led the Agency's enterprise resource planning project for almost three years.

The UNFPA focuses on questions of population and development issues, with special emphasis on women's and girls’ rights and sexual and reproduction health issues. This includes family planning, and efforts to lower mother and infant mortality rate.

As she started in her new jobs, Londén was especially concerned about the funding of the UN. “I see everywhere what funding cuts lead to”, she said.

Londén is preceded in the position of Assistant Secretary-General by e.g. the Finns Helvi Sipilä and Martti Ahtisaari.
