= Laura O'Toole =

Irish actress

- Born: Laura O'Toole; 5 June 1985 (age 40); Dublin, Ireland
- Occupation: Actress

Laura O'Toole (born 5 June 1985) is an Irish actress.

== Early life and background ==
O'Toole was born in Dublin, Ireland. She attended Alexandra College in Milltown, Dublin until 2003 and graduated from Drama Centre London in 2006.

== Career ==
O'Toole made her name six years ago in the Irish TV series On Home Ground on RTÉ. She played the female lead opposite Lily Allen's brother Alfie in Equus. She has also appeared in minor roles, including the role of Doctor on Lewis (one episode, 2008), and Cora Collins on On Home Ground (two episodes, 2001–2002).
