= Laura Fabris =

Materials scientist

Prof Laura Fabris
- Education: University of Padua
- Scientific career
- Thesis: Peptide Monolayers on Gold Nanoparticles and Surfaces (2006)
- Doctoral advisor: Flavio Maran

Laura Fabris is a professor at Polytechnic University of Turin, formerly associate professor for materials science and engineering at Rutgers University, New Jersey, United States.

== Life ==
Fabris studied chemistry at the University of Padua and finished her master's studies with her master's thesis "Artificial Photosynthetic Reaction Centers: Paramagnetic Intermediates Detected by EPR Spectroscopy" in 2001. She then received her doctoral degree in chemical sciences in April 2006 from the same university. The title of her dissertation was "Peptide Monolayers on Gold Nanoparticles and Surfaces". From 2006 to 2009, she was then a postdoc at the University of California, Santa Barbara. In March 2009, she was also a visiting researcher at the National University of Singapore. In July 2009, she became assistant professor in the Department of Materials Science and Engineering at Rutgers University. From June to August 2011, she was a visiting professor in the Air Force Research Laboratory. In July 2016, she is an associate professor at Rutgers University. She is now a full professor at Polytechnic University of Turin in the Department of Applied Science and Technology.

== Awards ==
She received an Air Force Summer Faculty Fellowship in 2011 and the Rutgers Faculty Research Award in 2012.

== Research ==
Fabris research concentrates on plasmonic nanoparticles and their synthesis, functionalization, characterization and application. She is also an expert in surface enhanced Raman scattering (SERS).
