= Laura Stellbrink =

German politician (born 1990)

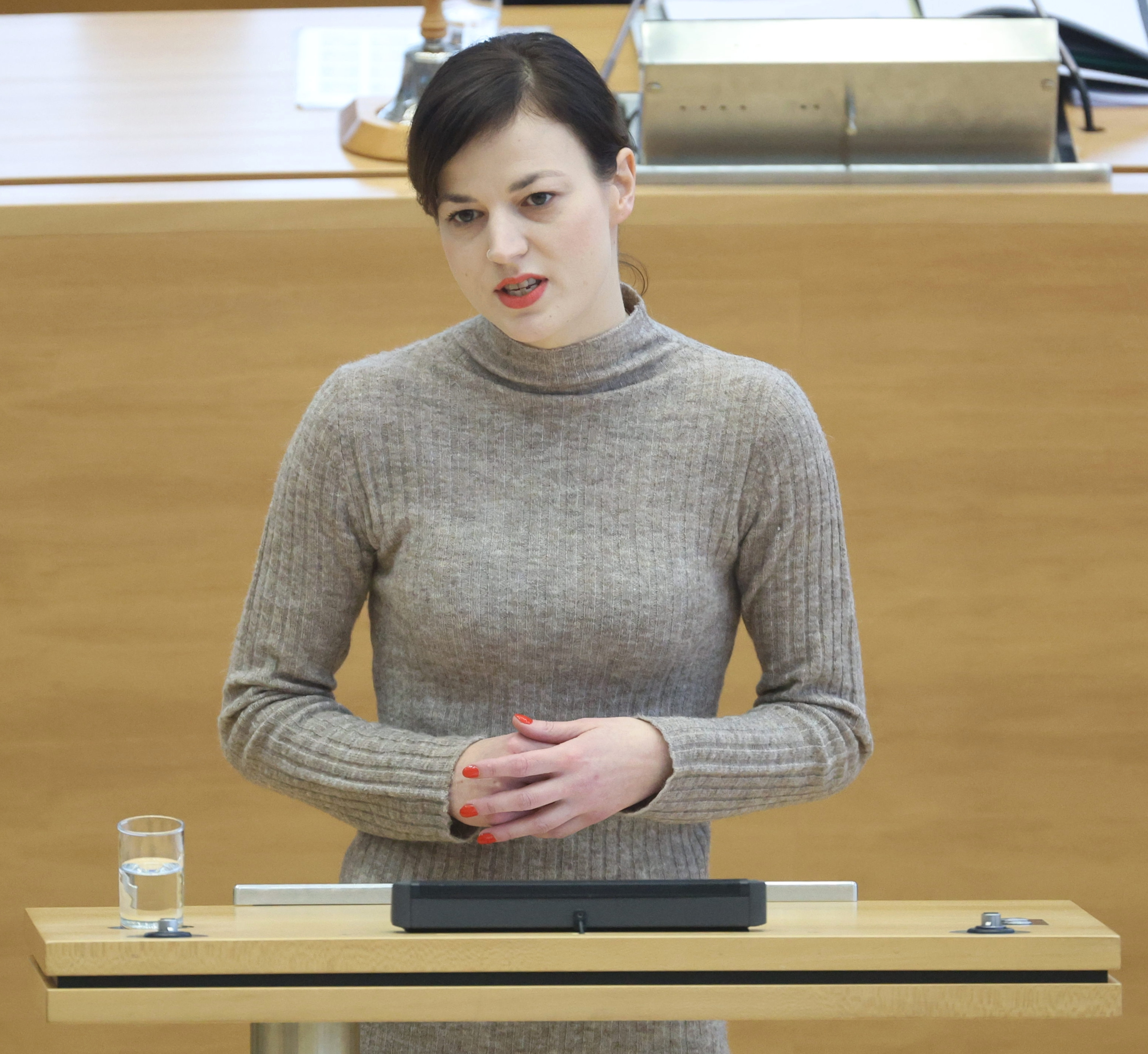
- Stellbrink in 2024

Member of the Landtag of Saxony
- Incumbent
- Assumed office 1 October 2024

Personal details
- Born: 27 September 1990 (age 35) Würzburg
- Party: Social Democratic Party (since 2015)

Laura Stellbrink (born 27 September 1990 in Würzburg) is a German politician serving as a member of the Landtag of Saxony since 2024. She has served as chairwoman of SPD Frauen in Saxony since 2018.
