= Laura Iglesias Romero =

Spanish chemist (1926–2022)

- Born: Laura Maria Matilde Iglesias Romero; 1926; Benavente, Zamora, Spain
- Died: 15 April 2022 (aged 96)
- Known for: Atomic spectroscopy

Laura Iglesias Romero (1926 – 15 April 2022) was a Spanish chemist who was a pioneer in the use of atomic spectroscopy in the study of the movements of stars.

== Biography ==
Born in Benavente, Zamora in 1928, Iglesias Romero was a scientific researcher at the Consejo Superior de Investigaciones Científicas (CSIC). In 1956 she received a grant from CSIC to study at the Princeton University where she worked with Allen Shenstone (at the time Dean of the Physics faculty). Following this, she moved to Washington in order to work at the National Bureau of Standards during the 1960s.

After refusing various offers, she returned to Spain to CSIC. After joining the Instituto de Óptica Daza de Valdés, she dedicated her studies to obtaining and observing spectra of transition metal elements, which would go on to be of particular interest in the field of astrophysics. These data were used to understand the movements of stars and other heavy elements in the periodic system.

In 2008, the 'Premio de Divulgación Científica' award for scientific communication, convened by the Valladolid Science Museum Foundation and the Castilla y León government, was named after her.

Iglesias Romero died on 15 April 2022, at the age of 96.
