= Laura Weber =

German politician (born 1984)

Member of the Landtag of Bavaria
- Incumbent
- Assumed office 30 October 2023
- Constituency: Upper Palatinate

Personal details
- Born: 25 March 1984 (age 42)
- Party: Alliance 90/The Greens (since 2019)

Laura Weber (born 25 March 1984) is a German politician serving as a member of the Landtag of Bavaria since 2023. She has served as co-spokesperson of Alliance 90/The Greens in Weiden in der Oberpfalz since 2021.
