= Laura Ahtime =

Seychellois statistician

Laura Marie-Thérèse Ahtime
- Occupation: Chief Executive National Bureau of Statistics.

Laura Marie-Thérèse Ahtime is the chief executive of the Seychelles National Bureau of Statistics.

Ahtime joined the bureau before earning any university-level degree, and after working there for approximately three years went to the University of Botswana, where she read statistics for four years. Later, she earned a master's degree in Quantitative Development Economics at the University of Warwick, under the support of a Chevening Scholarship. Returning to the Seychelles National Bureau of Statistics again after her studies, she was eventually promoted to director general, and then to chief executive in 2010. She became the first female chief executive of the bureau, even though as a whole the bureau is "very heavily female-dominated".

Under Ahtime's leadership Seychelles, which in past years did not see statistics as important, has made significantly greater use of the work of the bureau, by government bodies and newspapers, and in international relations. Ahtime pushed Seychelles to become part of the General Data Dissemination System of the International Monetary Fund, and to subscribe to the Special Data Dissemination Standard of the International Monetary Fund. She also published the first population and census atlas of Seychelles, and monitors the numbers of tourists visiting Seychelles.

Ahtime is an elected member of the International Statistical Institute.
