= David D. Nolte =

American physicist

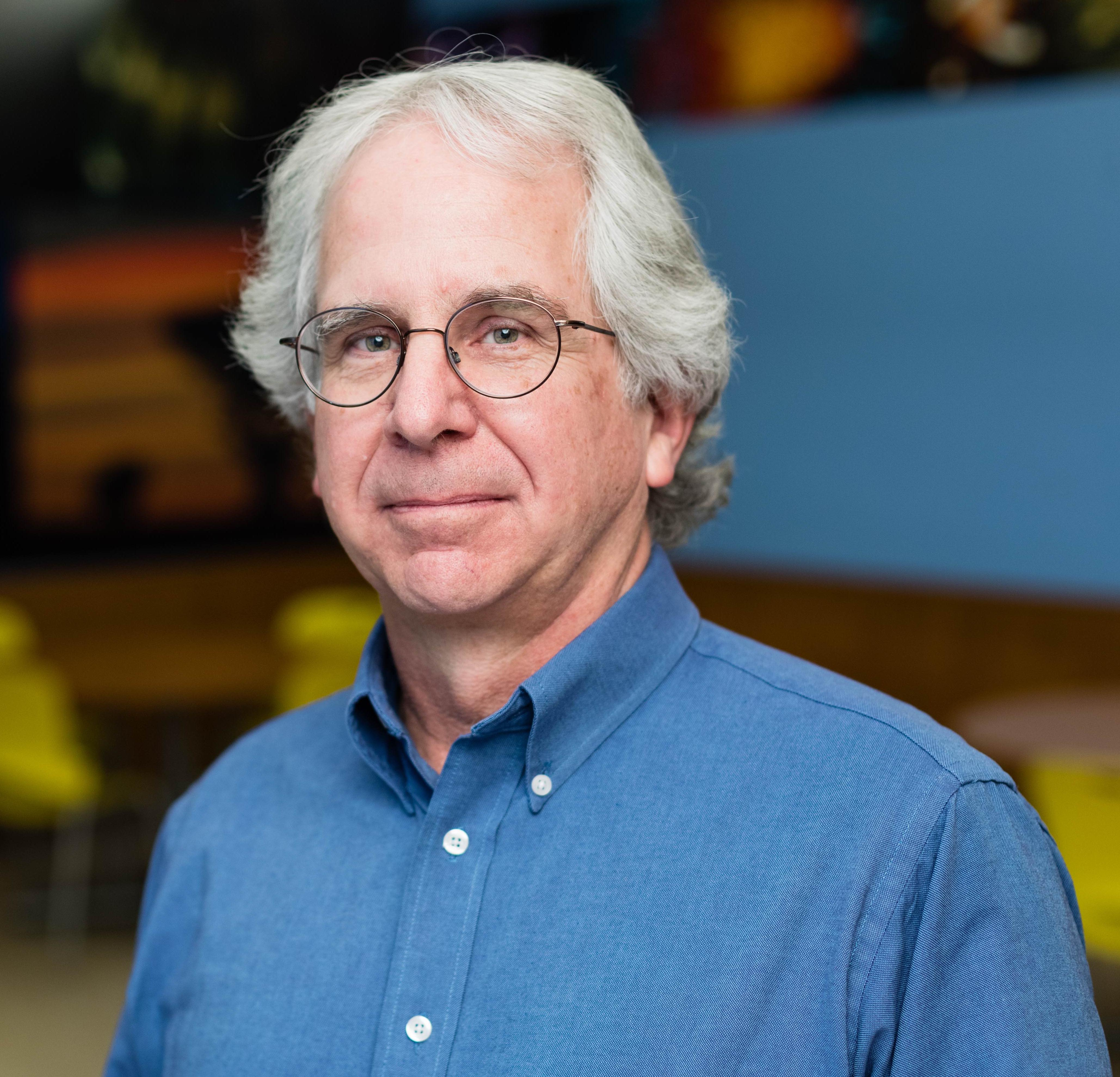
- Education: University of California, Berkeley (PhD 1988); Cornell University (MA 1981)
- Awards: Fellow of the National Academy of Inventors (2025); Fellow of the American Association for the Advancement of Science (2012); Fellow of the American Physical Society (2003); Fellow of the Optical Society of America (1997)
- Scientific career
- Workplaces: AT&T Bell Labs; Purdue University
- Website: www.galileo-unbound.blog

David D. Nolte is an American physicist working in semiconductors, nonlinear optics and interferometry. He holds the position of Edward Mills Purcell Distinguished Professor of Physics and Astronomy at Purdue University.

== Career ==
Nolte received his BA in 1981 from Cornell University and worked at DESY (Deutsches Electronen-Synchroton) on a DAAD scholarship before attending the University of California, Berkeley, where he received his PhD in Solid State Physics in 1988 under Eugene Haller and Leo Falicov. After graduation, he spent one year as a post-doctoral member of staff at AT&T Bell Labs working with Alastair Glass in the Optical Materials Department in Holmdel, NJ.

Nolte joined Purdue in 1989 as an Assistant Professor and received the NSF Presidential Young Investigator Award in 1991. He was promoted to Associate Professor in 1994 and later to Full Professor in 1999.. He received the Herbert Newby McCoy Award of Purdue University in 2005 for his scientific research and the Charles B. Murphy Award in 2026 for his contributions to undergraduate teaching.

Nolte is the author of three trade nonfiction books that popularize the history of science: Mind at Light Speed (Free Press, 2001), Galileo Unbound (Oxford University Press, 2018), and Interference (Oxford University Press, 2023). He also has authored physics textbooks on modern dynamics and biointerferometry.

Based on patents from his NSF-funded research, Nolte co-founded two biotech start-up companies. Quadraspec, Inc., founded in 2004, commercialized the BioCD technology that was marketed by Antech Diagnostics beginning in 2008 for canine health screening. Animated Dynamics Inc. (ADI), founded in 2011, is developing biodynamic Doppler imaging (BDI) for cancer therapy selection.

== Awards and honors ==
- Sloan Research Fellowship (1990)
- NSF Presidential Young Investigator Award (1991)
- Fellow of the Optical Society of America (1997)
- Fellow of the American Physical Society (2002)
- Herbert Newby McCoy Award, Purdue University (2005)
- Fellow of the American Association for the Advancement of Science (2012)
- Outstanding Faculty Commercialization Award (2017)
- Fellow of the National Academy of Inventors (2025)
- Charles B. Murphy Award, Purdue University (2026)

== Selected Books ==
- Nolte, David (2001). Mind at Light Speed: A New Kind of Intelligence. Free Press. ISBN 0743205014.
- Nolte, David (2018). Galileo Unbound: A Path Across Life, the Universe and Everything. Oxford University Press. ISBN 9780198805847.
- Nolte, David (2023). Interference: The History of Optical Interferometry and the Scientists Who Tamed Light. Oxford University Press. ISBN 9780192869760.
- Nolte, David (2026). Introduction to Modern Dynamics: From Classical Mechanics to Complex Systems,3rd Edition. Oxford University Press. ISBN 9780198966388.
