= Laura Attrux =

Canadian nurse

Laura Margaret Attrux (born June 28, 1909) was a Canadian nurse who received an honorary Doctor of Laws degree from the University of Alberta on June 19, 1970.

Attrux was born in Duck Lake, Saskatchewan. She had a career of forty-six years of nursing. Thirty-five of these were as a public health nurse employed by the Alberta government in northern Alberta. She worked mostly by herself as a district/municipal nurse in the remote communities of Valleyview, Whitecourt, Smith, Slave Lake, Wabasca, Swan Hills, Paddle Prairie, High Level, and Rainbow Lake. In 1967, at age 58, she took flying lessons and purchased a Cessna 150 airplane. She delivered 1,031 babies during her career.

== Sources ==
- Chapter on Laura Attrux in the book compiled and edited by Stewart, Irene "These Were Our Yesterdays - A History of District Nursing in Alberta" 1979, Irene Stewart, Calgary, Alberta
