= Laura Peery =

American ceramic artist (born 1952)

- Born: 1952 (age 73–74); Washington, D.C., U.S.
- Occupation: Artist
- Known for: porcelain

Laura Peery (born 1952) is an American ceramic artist.

== Career ==
She works with porcelain and has used techniques such as canvas imprinting to get texture on to clay.

Her work has been displayed at Smithsonian American Art Museum, and Convergence Gallery in New York City.
