= Tristan Walker (entrepreneur) =

American entrepreneur

Tristan Walker is an American founder and CEO, most notable for starting Walker & Company in 2013, which was later purchased by Procter & Gamble. In addition to being CEO of Walker & Company, Walker is a board member for Shake Shack and Foot Locker. He also co-founded the non-profit CODE2040, which helps connect people of color with engineering internships.

== Early life and education ==
Walker grew up in Queens, NY with his mother and older brother. His father was killed when he was three years old. Wanting a safe future for her children, Walker's mother encouraged her children to do well in school and was disciplined about their free time after school. Walker was awarded a scholarship to board and attend the elite Hotchkiss School, graduating in 2002. He studied economics at SUNY Stony Brook, and graduated in 2005. Between his first and second year at university, Walker was offered an internship at Lehman Brothers in their back office, and eventually was able to observe their trading desks. Upon graduation, Walker was employed as a trader for Lehman Brothers. In January 2008 Walker was laid off from his trading position at J.P. Morgan, the same year he attended Stanford Graduate School of Business.

== Career ==
Walker interned at Twitter and Boston Consulting Group before working at Foursquare as the third employee and director of business development.

In 2012, Walker was the Entrepreneur-in-residence at venture capital firm Andreessen Horowitz. While there, he co-founded CODE2040 and Walker & Co.

Walker & Co. is the parent company of Bevel, a men's grooming brand whose flagship product was a single-blade razor and electric trimmer. Bevel expanded into what Vibe called "a full-fledged beauty and skincare company for men." The health and hygiene company was founded with people of color as the target audience.

By 2015, Walker had raised a total of $33.3 million for Walker & Co, and board members included Magic Johnson, John Legend and, Andre Iguodala. Walker was nominated for Founder of the Year by TechCrunch in 2015, and in 2016 TechCrunch wrote that "Walker is becoming, if he’s not already, a household name in Silicon Valley."

In 2018, Walker & Co sold to Procter & Gamble for an undisclosed amount. Following the acquisition, Walker remained CEO of Walker & Company, which continued to operate as an independent subsidiary of Procter & Gamble, maintaining its mission to serve the health and beauty needs of people of color.

== Accolades ==
Fast Company called Walker in a profile: "[a] bold entrepreneur with a radical startup." The New York Times said that Walker "built a company for the demographic future." Fortune named him #19 in a list of the world's 50 greatest leaders in 2019. USA Today called Walker "the highest-profile African-American CEO and founder in Silicon Valley." When he was selected for the TIME 100 Next list, Time wrote that Walker "wants to build more than a company; he wants to build a legacy." In addition, Walker has been named to Fortune’s “40 under 40” list and Ebony’s Power 100 list. Walker is also a frequent keynote speaker at entrepreneurship and technology conferences, advocating for diversity and inclusion in business. He has served on the Stanford Graduate School of Business Advisory Council.

== Personal life ==
Walker has a wife and two sons.
