= Laura van Dolron =

Dutch stage director

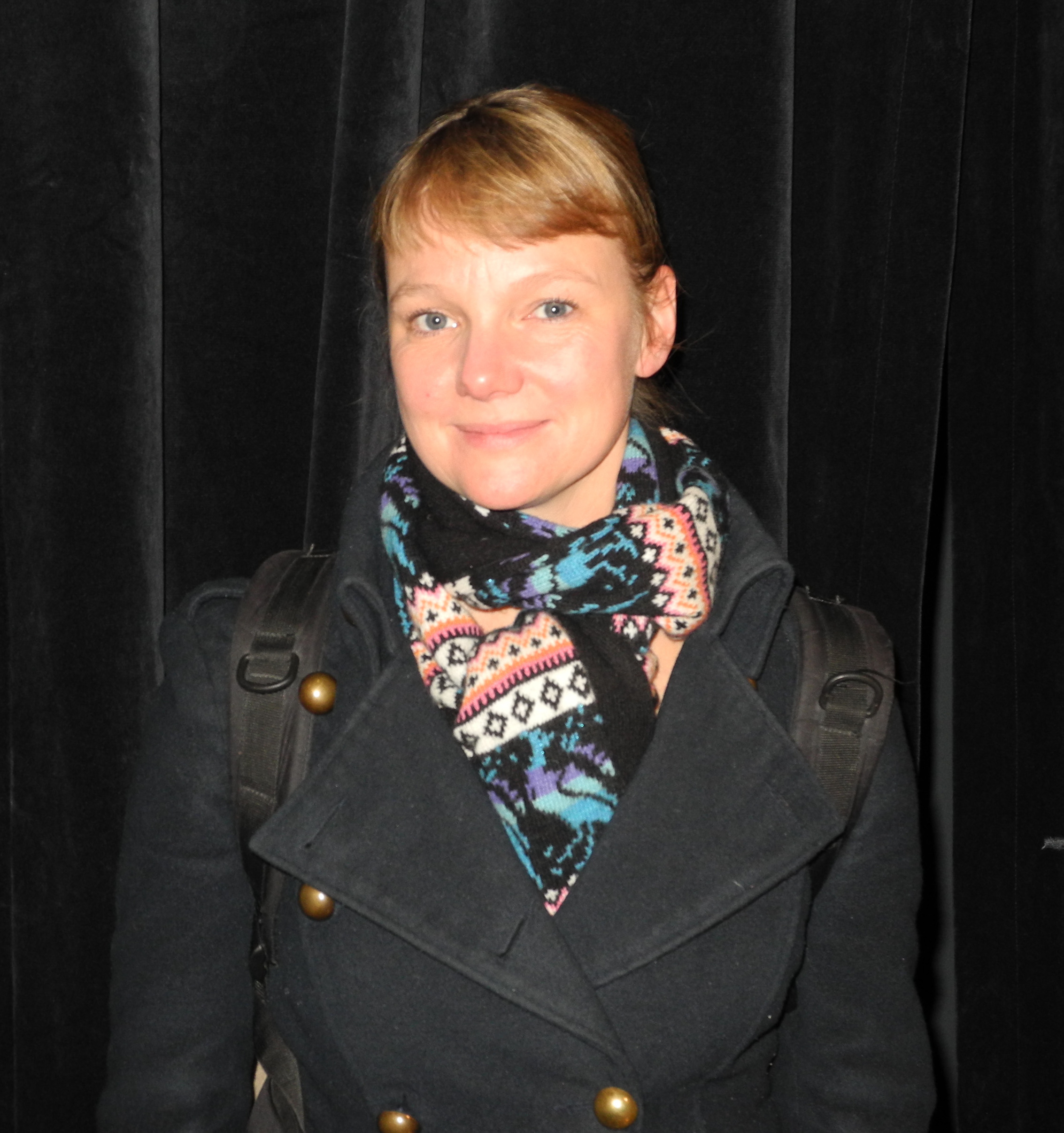
Laura van Dolron (2011).

Laura van Dolron (born 1976 in Rotterdam) is a Dutch stage director. After three performances with her own Flemish company The Sixth Company, she wrote, played and directed with several Dutch workshops and summer festivals, and large and small theater groups. Van Dolron studied at the Theater Academy of Maastricht, where she graduated as a director in 2001.

== Prizes ==
- Eric Vosprijs 2008
- Charlotte Köhlerprijs 2007
- BNG Nieuwe Theatermakersprijs 2007
- Young Makers Award 2004
- Limelightprijs 2003

== Performances ==
- Wat nodig is (het Nationale Toneel 2011)
- Iemand moet het doen (het Nationale Toneel 2009)
- Mijn naam is Rachel Corrie (Noord Nederlands Toneel 2008)
- Onschuld (Tweetakt 2008)
- Babyboomers (Noord Nederlands Toneel 2007)
- Lieg ik soms? (Noord Nederlands Toneel 2006)
- Wondersloffen (De Achterbankgeneratie 2006)
- Soldiers of misfortunes (Melkweg (Amsterdam) 2005)
- Later Weiter (Huis a/d Werf 2004)
- Something bigger (Huis a/d Werf 2002)
- Everything you say (Het Zesde Bedrijf 2003)
- In the prime of their lives (Huis a/d Werf 2003)
- Ik leef zo'n beetje adembenemend (De Troika 2002)
- Catching the Catcher (Plaza productie 2001)

=== Performances at Frascati (formerly known as Gasthuis) ===
- Het voordeel van de twijfel (2010)
- Als gekken (2009)
- Welk stuk? (2008)
- Laura & Lars (2008)
- Laatste Nachtmerrie (2007, geselecteerd voor TF1, Theaterfestifal 2008)
- Walden Revisited (2007, geselecteerd voor TF1 (openingsvoorstelling), Theaterfestival 2007)
- Over Morgen (2006, geselecteerd voor de Serie Nieuwe Theatermakers 2006–2007)
- Existential make-over (2004, geselecteerd voor de Serie Nieuwe Theatermakers 2004–2005) (Co-productie met Limelight)
