= Laura Niles =

American model, actress, comedian, martial artist and boxer

- Born: Laura Ellen Niles; 28 April 1978 (age 47); Los Angeles, California
- Occupations: Actress, boxer, comedian, martial artist, model
- Years active: 2004-present
- Known for: MMA sports and minor acting roles

Laura Niles is an American model, actress, comedian, martial artist, and boxer.

== Career ==
=== Acting ===
Niles' acting career started in 2004 with appearances on The Best Damn Sports Show Period as "Santa's Helper". Since then she has appeared in a variety of minor roles, guest appearances, and walk-on roles that include the television series' Gun X Sword (2005), Perfect 10 Model Boxing (2006), Gay, Straight or Taken? (2007, two episodes), Showtime's Californication, and the pilot episode for The Defenders.

Niles has also appeared in several movies such as Dire Wolf (2009), Cheerleader Massacre 2 (2011), and the Twilight parody film Twiharder (2013).

=== Modeling ===
Niles has been featured in numerous men's magazines such as Maxim (Germany, UK & US editions), Esquire (Turkey), FHM (UK), Complex, Tandem, and Hotdog. She was featured in the 2005 FastDates.com calendar with Playboy Cybergirl Michelle LaVoie. Niles was the cover model for the January/February Germany edition of Maxim.

=== Appearances ===
Niles was a member of the LA Temptation team in the 2006 Lingerie Bowl.

== Personal life ==
Niles was born in Los Angeles. Her ethnic lineage is Russian, British, and Native American (Nez Perce).

She received her BA in international relations (magna cum laude), with a minor in Mandarin Chinese, from the University of Southern California.

== Filmography (partial) ==
- Californication, 2007
- Lingerie Bowl, 2006
- The Best Damn Sports Show Period, 2004
