= Laura Lee Huttenbach =

Laura Lee Huttenbach is an author and athlete from Atlanta, Georgia. In 2001, the Georgia House of Representatives honored her with a resolution. Georgia House Resolution 586 commended her for her athleticism, academics, and community service.

Prior to the 1996 Olympics in Atlanta, she was nominated as a "community hero" and received the honor of carrying the Olympic Torch as it passed through the city of Atlanta. A list of Georgia runners was documented in Savannah Now.

== Career ==
Huttenbach's achievements as an athlete, including Georgia WIN Female Athlete of the year, Atlanta Journal/Constitution All-Area 9 Soccer Team, and Atlanta Journal/Constitution 10 All-Area Basketball Team earned her induction in the Riverwood High School Athletic Hall of Fame Inaugural Class.

Following graduation from the University of Virginia, she traveled which led to her work as a writer. Her first publication was a chapter in the book The Best Travel Writing 2010: True Stories from Around the World. While in Kenya, she met a 90 year old community leader who had a former life as a General in the Mau Mau rebellion. She later returned to Kenya to document his life, which became The Boy is Gone: Conversations with a Mau Mau General published by Ohio University Press.

Her second book, Running with Raven: The Amazing Story of One Man, His Passion, and the Community He Inspired, followed her move to South Beach. This book is about Robert Kraft, alias The Raven.
