= Laura Davies (bodybuilder) =

Canadian bodybuilder

Laura Davies (born July 23, 1960 in Hamilton, Ontario) is a professional Canadian bodybuilder of Welsh descent.

== Personal life ==
As a young child, Laura Davies displayed athletic ability. She participated in sports ranging from track to football. At the time weight-lifting was not a typical female pursuit in Canada. However, she began training. Simultaneously, she was approached to be a cheerleader for the Hamilton Tiger Cats. She became part of the Tiger Cats' team at age 16 and continued to be a cheerleader for five years. By that time, Laura Davies graduated from Delta High School in 1974. She married and had David Davies ( September 28, 1984) and Dalaura- Angel Davies (June 18, 1999).

== Bodybuilding career ==
Because of Laura's passion for weight lifting, she pursued bodybuilding. It was weightlifting that ultimately defined her. Today she is known as the "icon of bodybuilding."

Laura has had a successful bodybuilding career. She has had a multitude of wins. In 1980, she became the first Miss Ontario. A year later she won Miss Canada in 1981.

Laura took a thirty-year break from bodybuilding to raise two children, David Davies and Dalaura Angel Davies. After a long leave, she returned to the world of weights in her late forties. In 2010, when she returned to stage, she won the Miss Ontario Title again. Laura's perseverance and determination reflect that success can be achieved even in one’s later years.

== Contest history ==
- 1980 Miss Ontario 1st
- 1981 Miss Canada (scored 301 and a perfect score is 300) 1st
- 1982 Miss Focus 1st
- 2010 Miss Ontario 1st
