= Laura A. Sunderlin Nourse =

American poet

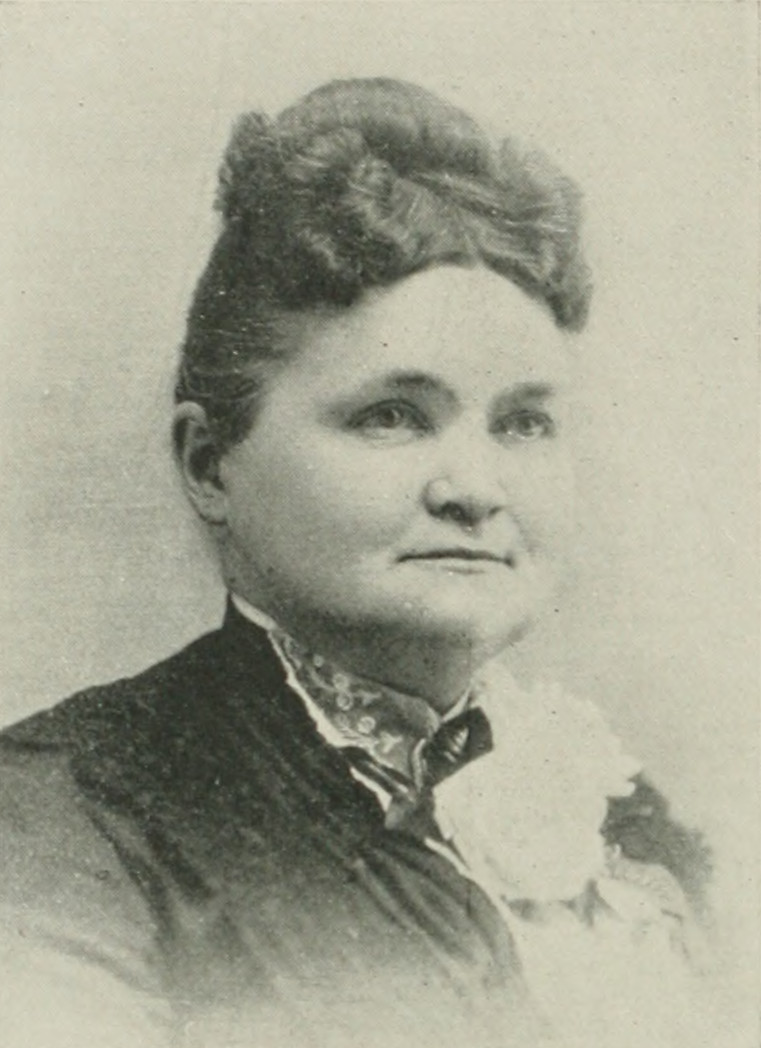
Laura A. Sunderlin Nourse, A woman of the century

Laura Angeline Barney Sunderlin Nourse (April 9, 1836 - 1899) was an American poet.

== Early life ==
Laura Angeline Barney was born in Independence, New York, on April 9, 1836. She was a daughter of Dr. Anthony Barney, one of the pioneers in Allegany County, New York, a man of taste and culture and a successful physician, and Roxa Chapin. Barney was the seventh child in a family of thirteen children.

She was educated in the public schools of Independence. In childhood her poetical talents manifested themselves strongly, and some of her earliest verses were printed in the "Christian Ambassador," of Auburn, New York.

== Career ==
Throughout her life Laura Sunderlin Nourse continued to write poetry, and her later works showed the finish and perfection that come of age and experience. In 1876 she published a volume of her prose and verse. She was a regular contributor to a number of newspapers. Between 1881 and 1886 she contributed a series of important articles on the science of life in the "Liberal Free Press," published in Wheatland, Iowa. In 1876, Nourse released "Pencilings from Immortality: A Collection of Writings from Inspiration. Also Writings Copied From Words Seen Clairvoyantly Upon the Wall...". She published an important long poem, entitled "The Lyric of Life: Unfolding Principles of Immortality in the Seen and Unseen Forces of Nature, New Thought in Planetary Motion and the World Life of Suns" (Buffalo, 1892).

== Personal life ==
In 1855 Laura A. Barney became the wife of Dr. Samuel Sunderlin, of Potter County, Pennsylvania. Two daughters and a son were born to them. They moved to Grand Mound, Iowa, after meeting financial reverses, and there her husband practiced until they moved to Maquoketa, Iowa. In 1881 they moved to Calamus, Iowa, where they lived until her husband's death, in 1886. In 1888 Laura Sunderlin became the wife of Dr. William Nourse, of Moline, Illinois.

Laura A. Sunderlin Nourse died in 1899.
