= BYU College of Life Sciences =

Coordinates: 40°14′42″N 111°38′58″W

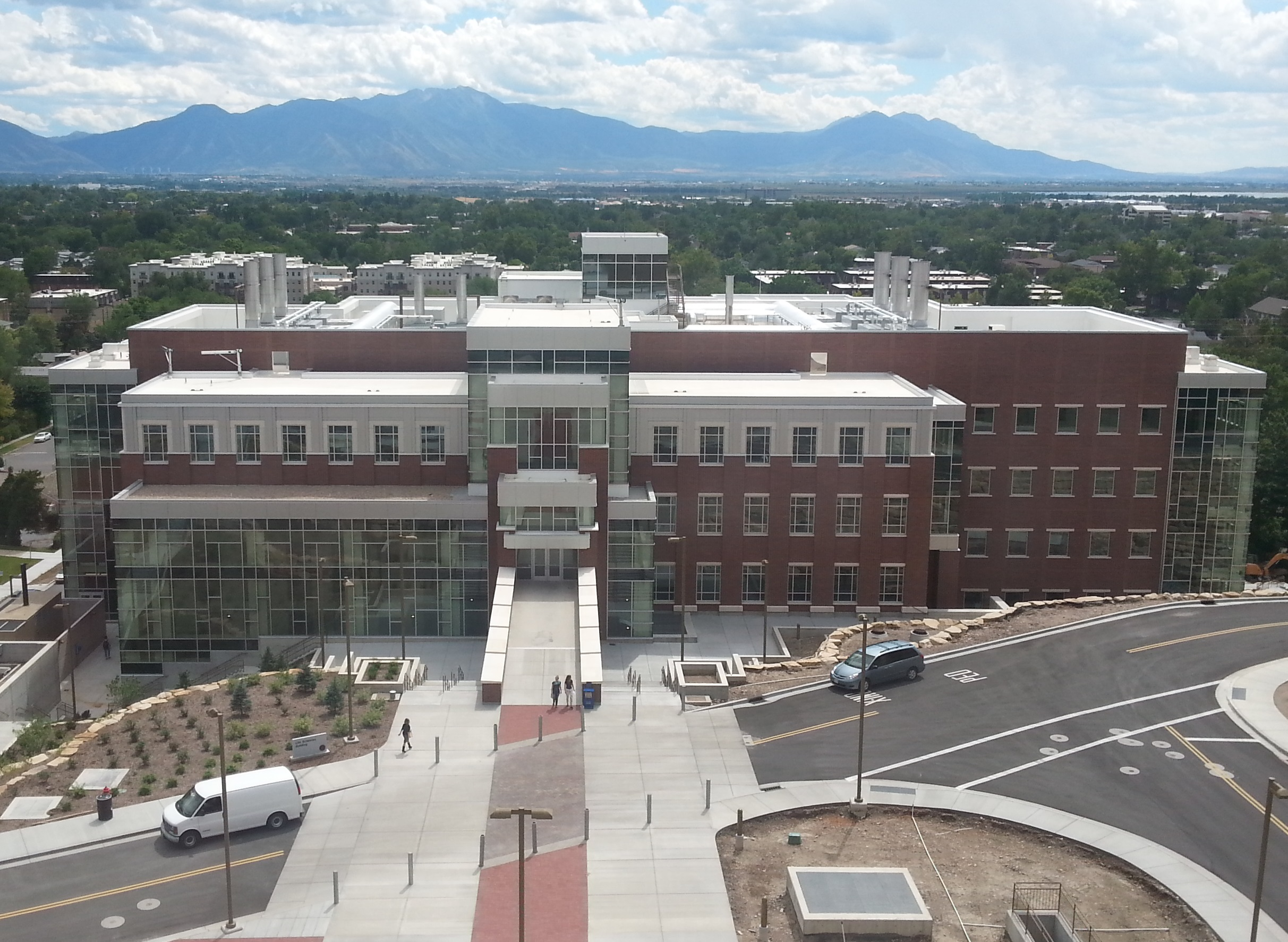
The Life Sciences Building at BYU

The BYU College of Life Sciences was originally named the College of Biology and Agriculture. It was formed in 1954 from the division of the College of Applied Science into this college and the College of Family Living, which was a partial predecessor of the College of Family, Home and Social Sciences. While the Agronomy; Horticulture; Animal Husbandry; Industrial Arts and Drawing; and Bacteriology programs all came from the College of Applied Science the Botany; and Zoology and Entomology programs came from the College of Arts and Sciences. Thomas L. Martin was the first dean of the College of Biology and Agriculture. In 1954 the Agricultural Economics Department was moved from the College of Commerce to the College of Biology and Agriculture.

In 1957 the General College, with the Industrial Education courses, the Technical Institute, Provisional Registration and the Institute of American Indian Studies and Research was divided off to form the General College.

== Old Departments ==
The Agronomy department was organized in 1920. It remained a separate department until 1968 when it was merged with the Horticulture Department to form the Department of Agronomy and Horticulture. Horticulture had also been formed as a department in 1920. In 1936 the Department of Landscape Architecture was formed which merged with Horticulture to form the Department of Horticulture and Landscape Architecture in 1942. In 1955 the same was shortened to just Horticulture which stayed as the name until the merger with the agronomy department.

The Animal Husbandry Department was organized in 1920 as well. It was renamed in 1953 the Department of Animal Husbandry and Poultry Husbandry. In 1954 when the new college was formed the department went back to the shorter name. In 1965 the department name was changed to Animal Science Department.

Bacteriology was not formed as a department until 1936. In 1968 it was renamed the Department of Microbiology.

The Department of Zoology and Entomology was formed in 1924. Starting in 1925 Vasco Tanner was the department chair. He eventually held this position for a total of 33 years. Also in 1924 the department of Botany was organized. This department was renamed Botany and Range Science in 1970.

== Post-2009 Departments ==
With the influx of departments from the disbanded College of Health and Human Performance and with the dissolution of the Agriculture Programs at BYU the whole structure of what had been the College of Biology and Agriculture changed. The first wave of changes had largely been implemented in 2003, but later changes were put in place later in the decade. The college has seven academic departments.

The Department of Biology encompasses four majors – biology, biological science education, bioinformatics and conservation biology. The department also has coordinated plans for students seeking entry into the fields of marine biology and preveterinary science. The department also has MS and PhD programs in biology.

The Department of Microbiology and Molecular Biology offers degrees in microbiology, molecular biology and medical laboratory science. The Department of Nutrition, Dietetics and Food Science offers degrees in each of those sub-areas. The Department of Physiology and Developmental Biology has majors in biophysics and in physiology and developmental biology.

The remaining three departments are Health Science, Exercise Sciences and Plant and Wildlife Sciences are to some extent less complex. Plant and Wildlife Sciences consists of only one major, also of that name. Exercise Sciences consists of majors in athletic training, exercise and wellness and exercise science. The Health Science program continues to offer majors in Public Health and School Health Education. It has school health education and driver safety education minors and offers a Masters of Public Health degree as well.

== Neuroscience ==
The Neuroscience Center was formed in 1999. It initially drew from departments in the David O. McKay School of Education (Communication Disorders), the College of Family, Home and Social Sciences (School of Family Life, Psychology department) and the College of Life Sciences (Physiology and developmental biology Department).

As of early 2011 there were B.S., masters and doctoral degrees offered by the Neuroscience Center. It had about 380 undergraduate and 6 graduate students. At some point during its first 11 years of existence the Neuroscience Center was realigned to be part of the College of Life Sciences.
