= Laura Davis Worley =

American dairy farmer

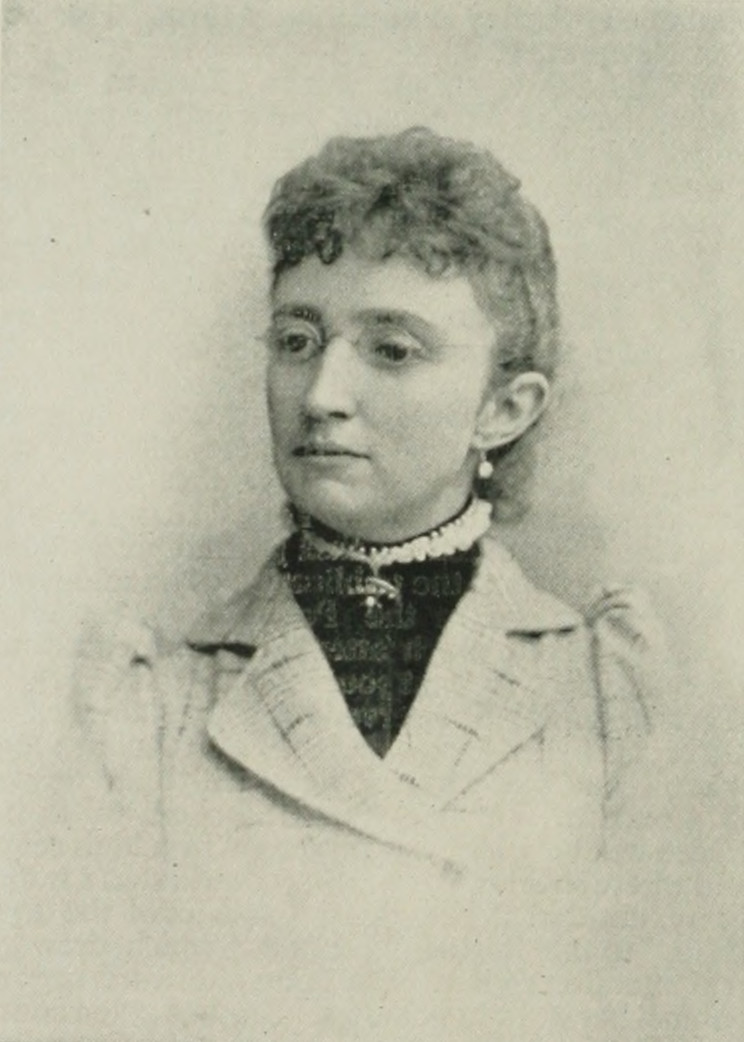
Laura Davis Worley

Laura Davis Worley (c. 1849 – August 1937) was an American dairy farmer and writer. She was a niece of Confederate president Jefferson Davis.

== Early life ==
Laura Davis Worley was born in McMinnville, Tennessee, in about 1849, the daughter of Frank and Betty Davis. She was a descendant of Frederick Davis, one of the original settlers of Nashville and niece of Jefferson Davis, president of the Confederacy during the American Civil War.

She was graduated in 1865 from St. Cecilia's Convent, in Nashville, where she laid the foundation of a liberal education and devoted much time to the study of music, painting and the French language.

After leaving school she continued her studies with private teachers. She traveled much in the United States and Canada.

== Career ==
Finding the need of occupation and amusement in a little country village, Worley turned her attention to dairy farming. She owned a large herd of Holstein and Jersey cattle and made a high grade of butter. She shipped butter to Indianapolis, Louisville, and Chicago. The venture was too large for a small town like Ellettsville and it was liquidated.

She was the secretary of the Indiana State Dairy Association since its organization, and was a writer on subjects connected with dairying in all its branches. She was affiliated with the agriculture department at Purdue University.

She was a member of the World's Fair Congress Auxiliary in the labor department, vice-president of the Indiana Farmers' Reading Circle, and a member of the advisory board of the National Farmers' Reading Circle.

She was a member of the executive committee of the World's Fair Managers for Indiana. Laura's sister, Florence Davis, was appointed by the Governor of Tennessee to also serve on the World's Fair commission. In 1893 she was one of the commissioners of the World's Columbian Exposition.

She is the author of "The Kenner Family".

== Personal life ==
She became the wife of Frank E. Worley, a banker and a large land-owner, of Ellettsville, Indiana. He was the owner of the Worley Bank. The bank was caught up in the Panic of 1893 and Worley lost several thousand dollars in personal wealth.

The Frank E. Worley House on the outskirts of Ellettsville was built in 1876 on the site of the old home of Worley's parents. The new house had a tower in the center front and the entrance is through the portico formed by the base of the tower. The architect was Joseph Marshall, Indianapolis. The stonemason was Thomas McIntosh of Greencastle. The Worleys sold it in 1898 and moved to St. Louis, Missouri. The house was demolished in 1942.

The Worleys owned a Mansion on Mobile Avenue in Daytona, Florida.

She died in August 1937, in St. Louis, and is buried at Riverside Cemetery, McMinnville.

== Legacy ==
In 1915 she paid to place the Davis Memorial Fountain in the city park of McMinnville, as a memorial to her parents. The fountain features a statue of Hebe, goddess of youth.

She was the first benefactor for the founding of the Wm. H. & Edgar J. Magness Community House and Library or Magness Library, in McMinnville.
