= Laura Jean McLaughlin =

American mosaic and ceramic artist (born 1965)

- Born: 1965 (age 60–61); Pittsburgh, Pennsylvania
- Occupation: Ceramic Artist

Laura Jean McLaughlin (born 1965) is an American ceramic sculptor, print maker, and mosaic artist. Her collaborative mosaics can be found around Pittsburgh and the surrounding areas. She has been awarded several residencies including three from the Kohler Co. in Wisconsin.

== Selected exhibitions ==
- 18 Hands Gallery, “Penland Through the Years”, Houston, Texas, 2011
- Panza Gallery, “Flying”, Pittsburgh, Pennsylvania, 2011
- Sherrie Gallerie, June Gallery Hop, Columbus, Ohio, 2013
- Penland Gallery, Penland, North Carolina, 2014
- Andy Warhol Museum, Benefit Auction, Pittsburgh, Pennsylvania, 2014
- Chautauqua Institution Gallery, 5 person exhibition “Naked”, Chautauqua, New York, 2015
- Morgan Contemporary Glass Gallery, Group exhibition, Pittsburgh, Pennsylvania, 2015
- Lascaux Gallery, “Past. Present. Future”, Chelsea, New York, NY, 2016
- BE Gallery, Pittsburgh, Pennsylvania, 2017
- Pittsburgh Center for the Arts, Pittsburgh, Pennsylvania, 2017

== Public arts ==
McLaughlin has been commissioned to create and install collaborative mosaics in and around Pittsburgh, PA since 2004.
