= Laura Robinson (scientist) =

British geochemist

Laura Frances Robinson
- Born: November 1976 (age 49–50)
- Education: University of Oxford; University of Cambridge
- Scientific career
- Workplaces: University of Bristol; Caltech; Woods Hole Oceanographic Institution
- Thesis: Pleistocene climate chronology and ocean circulation in the Bahamas using U-series nuclides (2002)

Laura Frances Robinson (born November 1976) is a British geochemist. She is a professor of geochemistry at the University of Bristol. She makes use of geochemistry to study the processes that govern the climate. In particular, Robinson studies radioactive elements, as these can be analysed in geological materials. She was awarded the 2010 President's Award of the Geological Society of London.

== Early life and education ==
Robinson was an undergraduate student at the University of Cambridge, where she studied natural sciences. She moved to the University of Oxford for her graduate studies, where she investigated pleistocene climate chronology. After completing her doctorate, Robinson moved to California. She was appointed a postdoctoral fellow at California Institute of Technology. At Caltech, worked alongside Jess Adkins on deep sea corals. The research took her on a cruise in the North Atlantic ocean, where she journeyed in a submarine to undersea mountains. On this trip she collected fossils from the sea floor. She studied 16,000 year old coral fossils from the Southern Ocean. This experience inspired her to explore how the Atlantic Ocean changed during climate transitions. She moved to the Woods Hole Oceanographic Institution, where she was made Associate Scientist.

== Research and career ==
Robinson was awarded the 2010 Geological Society of London President's Award for her contributions to geosciences. In 2011 Robinson moved back to the United Kingdom, where she was appointed to the faculty of the University of Bristol. She was awarded a European Research Council Starting Grant studying changes in chemistry and circulation of the Atlantic Ocean. She makes use of an Agassiz Trawl to collect samples from the floor of the ocean, with a particular focus on deep-sea corals. Robinson was involved with a British Antarctic Survey mission to the South Orkney Islands. The mission took place on the RRS James Clark Ross and investigated the biodiversity in and outside of the South Orkney Islands. For this work she was awarded the Antarctic Service Medal.

In 2016, she delivered a Ted Talk on the secrets she discovers on the ocean floor.

== Selected publications ==
- Michelle L. Taylor; Claire Gwinnett; Laura Robinson; L C Woodall (30 September 2016). "Plastic microfibre ingestion by deep-sea organisms". Scientific Reports. 6 33997. Bibcode:2016NatSR...633997T. doi:10.1038/srep33997. ISSN 2045-2322. PMC 5043174. PMID 27687574. Wikidata Q36149221.
- Laura F. Robinson; Jess F. Adkins; Lloyd D. Keigwin; John Southon; Diego P. Fernandez; S-L Wang; Daniel S. Scheirer (3 November 2005). "Radiocarbon variability in the western North Atlantic during the last deglaciation". Science. 310 (5753): 1469–1473. Bibcode:2005Sci...310.1469R. doi:10.1126/science.1114832. ISSN 0036-8075. PMID 16322451. Wikidata Q45167048.
- Andrea Burke; Laura F Robinson (15 December 2011). "The Southern Ocean's role in carbon exchange during the last deglaciation". Science. 335 (6068): 557–561. Bibcode:2012Sci...335..557B. doi:10.1126/science.1208163. ISSN 0036-8075. PMID 22174131. Wikidata Q43529277.
