= Laura Hill Chapman =

American art educator (1935-2021)

- Born: April 24, 1935
- Died: August 17, 2021 (aged 86)
- Education: Florida State University (B.S.), New York University (M.Arts); Ohio State University (Ph.D)
- Occupation: art educator
- Known for: creating art education curriculum packages
- Notable work: Publications
- Relatives: Mickey Cochrane (uncle)

Laura Hill Chapman (April 24, 1935 – August 17, 2021) was an American art educator. She has written several books and given numerous speeches showing how to assess work in an art classroom. She taught art in Florida Public Schools and held faculty posts at Indiana University, University of Illinois, Ohio State University, and the University of Cincinnati. She wrote more than three-dozen award-winning books on art education.

== Education ==
Chapman obtained a Bachelor of Science degree from Florida State University in 1957. She subsequently studied at New York University, obtaining a Master of Arts degree in 1960. In 1966 she achieved her Doctorate of Philosophy at Ohio State University.

== Career ==
Chapman taught in schools around Dade County, Florida near Miami, Florida from 1957 to 1959, and public schools in Cincinnati from 1970 to 1971. She was an Instructor of Art Education at Indiana University Bloomington from 1957 to 1959 and Ohio State University from 1962 to 1964. Chapman was an assistant professor in art education at Ohio State from 1966 to 1970 and University of Illinois, Champaign-Urbana from 1964 to 1966. She was an associate professor in art education at University of Cincinnati from 1971 to 1973, and a professor of art education from 1973 to 1978.

Chapman has been a consultant, writer in art education, and private practice in Cincinnati since 1978. She was a consultant in national instructional television in Bloomington, Indiana, from 1966 to 1968 and 1972 to 1979. She was a part of the Ohio State Department of Education in Columbus from 1969 to 1975. She was a part of the National Education Association in Washington from 1986 to 1987. From 1982 to 1987 she was a part of the Jean Paul Getty Trust Programs on education in art in Los Angeles. In 2017 she was a keynote speaker at the National Art Education Association Convention in New York, basing her talk on the state of art education in the United States.

== Personal life and death ==
Chapman was the niece of Hall of Fame Baseball Player Mickey Cochrane. She died on August 17, 2021, at the age of 86.

== Research ==
Chapman wrote several art education books, most regard how to implement art correctly into your own classroom. She published thoughts on the state of art education and what needs to change for the future.

Chapman created art education curriculum packages for schools to purchase and implement. An example of this is the Adventures in Art curriculum. It comes with lessons related to standards and the examples pertaining to lessons. It includes a teacher and student edition.

No Child Left Behind (No Child Left Behind in Art): She has worked for over 40 years in support and improvement of Art Education Curriculum. She has been an advocate for Art Education to stay in Schools since the 1970s. The implementation of No Child Left Behind by policy makers / people who had little to no Art Education or expertise caused problems in the Art Education world. It is the most detrimental in poor socioeconomic areas in the 2000s, even though Arts are considered core subjects in No Child Left Behind. Laura Hill Chapman often questions its methods to improve public schools and how this big idea of education is becoming a rote memorization based education through standardized testing.

Chapman was a Summit participate in 2008 of a group of scholars, stake holders, and friends of Art Education by the National Art Education Association that convened at the Aspen Institute to engage in a deep discussion about the future of visual arts in education. This meeting was very focused on student learning in a visual age. It captures the possible important outcomes of Art Education in the United States. It was basically an in depth discussion on critical issues in the field of Art Education today and how these people can make it more influential.

== Publications ==
- Approaches to Art in Education (1978)
- Instant Art, Instant Culture: The Unspoken Policy for American Schools (1982)
- A World of Images (a Discover Art Book)
- Adventures in Art textbook series
- Art: Images and Ideas
- Status of Elementary Art Education: 1997-2004 published in Studies in Art Education
- No Child Left Behind in Art? published in Arts Education Policy Review
