= Laura S. Boylan =

American neurologist

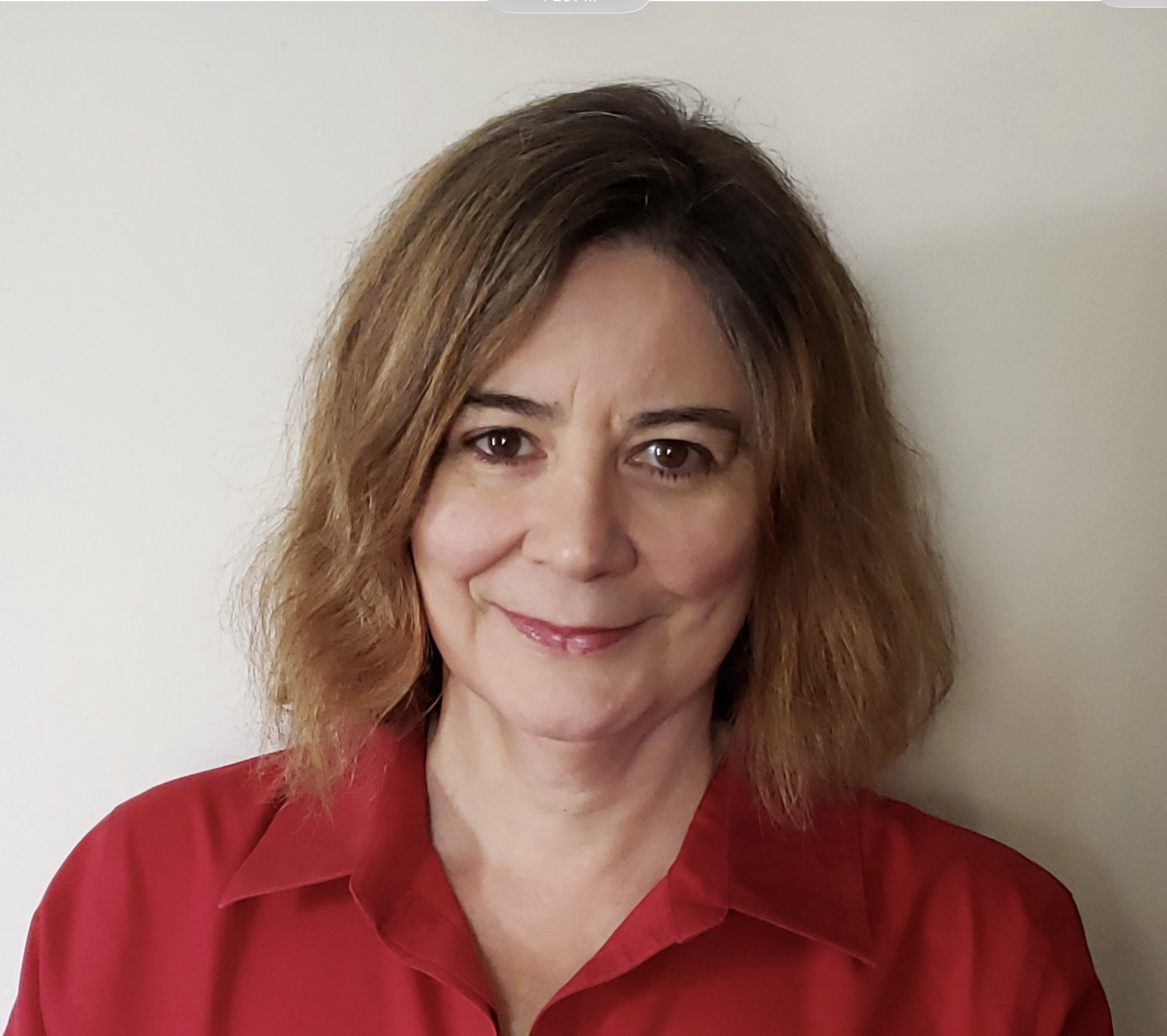

Laura S. Boylan is a distinguished neurologist in New York City. She served as an adjunct professor of neurology at the New York University School of Medicine, an attending at Bellevue Hospital New York City Health + Hospitals and consulting neurologist at the New York State Psychiatric Institute.

== Education ==
Laura Boylan graduated and received a Bachelor of Arts from Barnard College and her medical degree from Columbia University College of Physicians and Surgeons. She completed an internship at St Vincent's Hospital and finished her residency in neurology at the Neurological Institute at Columbia-Presbyterian Medical Center in New York City. Her passion to study neurology evolved from a desire to cure her family disease.

== Research and career ==
Boylan began her research career at a job in the HIV Center for Clinical and Behavioral Research at the New York State Psychiatric Institute. Her advisor inspired her to go back to medical school. She then went on to complete early research in neuromodulation and the psychiatric manifestation of neurologic disease, a focus of her current research. She has contributed to the scientific literature and published and spoken extensively for the general public on medicine, health care policy and reform. Boylan started Locum Tenens work after leaving full-time academe at NYU; this work took her to smaller cities and rural areas in the US. Boylan worked for years as a neurohospitalist in Duluth, Minnesota. Boylan has also taught as an honorary assistant professor in formal didactics and clinical rounds in hospitals in Addis Ababa and Gondar in Ethiopia.

== Personal life ==
Boylan grew up in New York City; she has an older brother of 2 years, Ross Boylan. She was a mother when she started medical school.

== Select publications ==
- Boylan, Laura; Stein, Zena A. (1991). "The Epidemiology of HIV Infection in Children and Their Mothers—Vertical Transmission". Epidemiologic Reviews. 13 (1): 143–177. doi:10.1093/oxfordjournals.epirev.a036067. ISSN 1478-6729.
- Boylan, L. S. (1999-09-27). "Mutual influences between paroxysmal hypertension and psychiatric disturbance". Archives of Internal Medicine. 159 (17): 2091–2092. doi:10.1001/archinte.159.17.2091. ISSN 0003-9926. PMID 10511000
- Boylan, Laura S. (2000–08). "Limbic Encephalitis and Late-Onset Psychosis". American Journal of Psychiatry. 157 (8): 1343–1344. doi:10.1176/appi.ajp.157.8.1343. ISSN 0002-953X.
- Boylan, L. S.; Haskett, R. F.; Mulsant, B. H.; Greenberg, R. M.; Prudic, J.; Spicknall, K.; Lisanby, S. H.; Sackeim, H. A. (2000–03). "Determinants of seizure threshold in ECT: benzodiazepine use, anesthetic dosage, and other factors". The journal of ECT. 16 (1): 3–18. doi:10.1097/00124509-200003000-00002. ISSN 1095-0680. PMID 10735327.
- Boylan, L. S.; Devanand, D. P.; Lisanby, S. H.; Nobler, M. S.; Prudic, J.; Sackeim, H. A. (2001–09). "Focal prefrontal seizures induced by bilateral ECT". The journal of ECT. 17 (3): 175–179. doi:10.1097/00124509-200109000-00005. ISSN 1095-0680. PMID 11528307.
- Boylan, Laura S.; Fouladvand, Mohammad (2001-02-27). "Developmental apraxia arising from neonatal brachial plexus palsy". Neurology. 56 (4): 576–577. doi:10.1212/WNL.56.4.576-a. ISSN 0028-3878.
- Boylan, L S (2001-01-01). "Postictal psychosis related regional cerebral hyperfusion". Journal of Neurology, Neurosurgery & Psychiatry. 70 (1): 137a–138. doi:10.1136/jnnp.70.1.137a PMC 1763490 PMID 11118274
- Boylan, L. S.; Pullman, S. L.; Lisanby, S. H.; Spicknall, K. E.; Sackeim, H. A. (2001–02). "Repetitive transcranial magnetic stimulation to SMA worsens complex movements in Parkinson's disease". Clinical Neurophysiology: Official Journal of the International Federation of Clinical Neurophysiology. 112 (2): 259–264. doi:10.1016/s1388-2457(00)00519-8. ISSN 1388-2457. PMID 11165527.
- Boylan, L. S.; Flint, L. A.; Labovitz, D. L.; Jackson, S. C.; Starner, K.; Devinsky, O. (2004-01-27). "Depression but not seizure frequency predicts quality of life in treatment-resistant epilepsy". Neurology. 62 (2): 258–261. doi:10.1212/01.wnl.0000103282.62353.85. ISSN 1526-632X. PMID 14745064.
- Boylan, Laura S. (2007-10-16). "Psychotropic effects of antiepileptic drugs". Neurology. 69 (16): 1640. doi:10.1212/01.wnl.0000285525.64585.45. ISSN 0028-3878. PMID 17938375
