= Laur =

Laur may refer to:

- Laur, Nueva Ecija, a municipality in the Central Luzon region of the Philippines
- Laur (clan)
- Laur (surname)
- Laur Kingdom, a historical nation
- Laur (musician), Japanese musician and DJ

== See also ==
- Lauer (disambiguation)
- Laure (disambiguation)
