= Lauer (disambiguation) =

Lauer may refer to:

== People ==
- Lauer (surname), and people with this surname

== Places ==
- Lauer (river), a river in Bavaria, Germany
- Lauer, Indiana, an unincorporated community in Perry County, Indiana, United States
- Lauer, Norway, a small island in the Hvaler municipality

== See also ==
- Bob deLauer (1920–2002), American football player
- Laur, Nueva Ecija, a municipality in Nueva Ecija, Philippines
- Laur (surname), an Estonian name
- Laure (disambiguation)
