= Laure =

Laure may refer to:

- Laure (film), a 1976 Italian erotic film in the Emmanuelle universe
- Doxocopa laure, commonly known as the Laure, a butterfly

== People ==
- Laura (given name) (French variant)
- Laure (art model) (fl. 1859–1867), French model for Édouard Manet
- Laure (Nepalese rapper), Aashish Rana (born 1989), Nepalese rapper and actor
- Laure (footballer) (born 1985) or Laure, Spanish football player
- Laure Diebold (1915–1965), French resistance member
- Laure Manaudou (born 1986), French swimmer
- Colette Peignot (1903–1938), pen name Laure, French author

== See also ==
- Lauer (disambiguation)
- Laur (surname)
- Laura (disambiguation)
- Laurel (disambiguation)
- Lauren (disambiguation)
- Laurer
- Lauret (disambiguation)
- Laurey (disambiguation)
- Laurie (disambiguation)
