= Jarno =

Male given name

Jarno is a Finnish male given name, which is a variant of Jerome or Jeremiah. Jarno may refer to:

== People ==
=== First name ===
- Jarno Elg (born 1975), Finnish killer
- Jarno Hams (born 1974), Dutch strongman
- Jarno Heinikangas (born 1979), Finnish football player
- Jarno Kärki (born 1994), Finnish ice hockey player
- Jarno Koskiranta (born 1986), Finnish ice hockey player
- Jarno Kultanen (born 1973), Finnish ice hockey player
- Jarno Laasala (born 1979), Finnish actor
- Jarno Laur (born 1975), Estonian politician
- Jarno Mattila (born 1984), Finnish football player
- Jarno Molenberghs (born 1989), Belgian football player
- Jarno Opmeer (born 2000), Dutch esports driver
- Jarno Parikka (born 1986), Finnish football player
- Jarno Pihlava (born 1979), Finnish swimmer
- Jarno Saarinen (1945–1973), Finnish motorcycle racer
- Jarno Salomaa, Finnish musician
- Jarno Sarkula (1973–2020), Finnish musician
- Jarno Tenkula (born 1982), Finnish football player
- Jarno Trulli (born 1974), Italian racing car driver
- Jarno Väkiparta (born 1974), Finnish bandy player

=== Surname ===
- Georg Jarno (1868–1920), Hungarian composer
- Josef Jarno (1866–1932), Austrian actor

== See also ==
- Jeremiah (given name)
