= Johnny Bench =

American baseball player (born 1947)

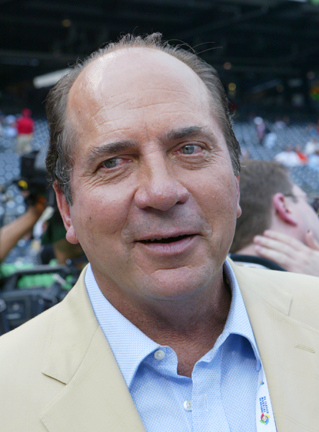
- Bench in 2006
- Catcher
- Born: December 7, 1947 (age 78); Oklahoma City, Oklahoma, U.S.
- Batted: Right Threw: Right

MLB debut
- August 28, 1967, for the Cincinnati Reds

Last MLB appearance
- September 29, 1983, for the Cincinnati Reds

MLB statistics
- Batting average: .267
- Hits: 2,048
- Home runs: 389
- Runs batted in: 1,376
- Stats at Baseball Reference

Teams
- Cincinnati Reds (1967–1983)

Career highlights and awards
- 14× All-Star (1968–1980, 1983); 2× World Series champion (1975, 1976); 2× NL MVP (1970, 1972); World Series MVP (1976); NL Rookie of the Year (1968); 10× Gold Glove Award (1968–1977); 2× MLB home run leader (1970, 1972); 3× MLB RBI leader (1970, 1972, 1974); Cincinnati Reds No. 5 retired; Cincinnati Reds Hall of Fame; Major League Baseball All-Century Team; Major League Baseball All-Time Team

Member of the National

Baseball Hall of Fame
- Induction: 1989
- Vote: 96.4% (first ballot)

Johnny Lee Bench (born December 7, 1947) is an American former professional baseball player. He played his entire Major League Baseball (MLB) career, which lasted from 1967 to 1983, with the Cincinnati Reds, primarily as a catcher. Bench led the Reds team known as the Big Red Machine that dominated the National League in the mid-1970s, winning six division titles, four National League pennants, and two World Series championships.

A 14-time All-Star and a two-time National League Most Valuable Player, Bench excelled on offense and defense, twice leading the majors in home runs and three times in runs batted in. At the time of his retirement in 1983, he held the major league record for most home runs hit by a catcher. He was also the first catcher to lead the league in home runs. He hit 45 home runs in 1970, the single-season record for catchers until Salvador Perez hit 48 in 2021; Bench still holds the National League record. His 389 home runs and 1,376 runs batted in are the most in Cincinnati Reds history.

On defense, Bench was a 10-time Gold Glove Award winner who skillfully handled pitching staffs and possessed a strong, accurate throwing arm. He caught 100 or more games for 13 consecutive seasons. In 1986, Bench was inducted into the Cincinnati Reds Hall of Fame. He was inducted into the Baseball Hall of Fame in 1989 in his first year of eligibility. He was named to MLB's All-Time Team in 1997 and All-Century Team in 1999, and ESPN has called him the greatest catcher in baseball history.

== Early life ==
Born and raised in Oklahoma, Bench is 1/8 Choctaw. He played baseball and basketball and was class valedictorian at Binger-Oney High School in Binger. He survived a bus crash that killed two of his baseball teammates in 1965. His father, a truck driver, told him that the fastest route to becoming a major leaguer was as a catcher.

== Professional career ==
=== Draft and minor leagues ===
The Cincinnati Reds selected Bench as a 17-year-old in the second round, with the 36th overall selection of the 1965 Major League Baseball draft. Bench originally had been scouted by Byron Humphrey and Jim Russo of the Baltimore Orioles, and Russo had recommended to the Reds' Jim McLaughlin that the Reds send a scout to see Bench play in Oklahoma (though Russo still wanted the Orioles to draft Bench). In 1965, Bench played for the Tampa Tarpons and Reds' Florida Instructional League team. He played for the Triple-A Buffalo Bisons in 1966 and 1967. During the Bisons' 1967 season, he hit a grand slam against fellow future Hall of Famer Jim Palmer, then playing for the Orioles' Triple-A farm team, the Rochester Red Wings; Palmer did not allow another grand slam in his entire professional career. Russo had signed Palmer for the Orioles, and had the Orioles followed Russo's advice and drafted Bench, Palmer and Bench would have been teammates instead of opponents.

=== 1967–1969: debut and Rookie of the Year ===
Bench was called up to the Reds in August 1967. He hit only .163, but impressed many people with his defense and strong throwing arm, among them Hall of Famer Ted Williams. Williams signed a baseball for him and predicted that the young catcher would be a "Hall of Famer for sure!" Williams' prophecy became fact 22 years later in 1989 when Bench was elected to Cooperstown.

During a 1968 spring training game, Bench was catching right-hander Jim Maloney, an eight-year veteran. Maloney was once a hard thrower, but injuries had dramatically slowed down his fastball. Maloney nevertheless insisted on repeatedly "shaking off" his younger catcher by throwing fastballs instead of the breaking balls that Bench had called for. When an exasperated Bench bluntly told Maloney, "Your fastball's not popping," Maloney replied with an epithet. To prove to Maloney that his fastball was no longer effective, Bench called for a fastball, and after Maloney released the ball, Bench dropped his catcher's mitt and caught the fastball barehanded. Bench was the Reds' catcher on April 30, 1969, when Maloney pitched a no hitter against the Houston Astros.

In 1968, the 20-year-old Bench impressed many in his first full season; he won the National League Rookie of the Year Award, batting .275 with 15 home runs and 82 RBIs. This marked the first time that the award had been won by a catcher. He also won the 1968 National League Gold Glove Award for catchers, the first time a rookie had won that award. He made 102 assists in 1968, which was the first time in 23 years that a catcher had more than 100 assists in a season. During the Vietnam War, Bench served in the United States Army Reserve as a member of the 478th Engineer Battalion, which was based across the Ohio River from Cincinnati at Fort Thomas, Kentucky. This unit included several of his teammates, including Pete Rose, Bobby Tolan, and Darrel Chaney. In the winter of 1970–1971, Bench was part of Bob Hope's USO Tour of Vietnam.

=== 1970s: MVPs, World Series ===
In 1970, Bench had his finest statistical season. At age 22, he became the youngest player to win the National League Most Valuable Player Award. He hit .293, led the majors with 45 home runs and a franchise-record 148 runs batted in as the Reds won the NL West Division. The Reds swept the Pittsburgh Pirates in the National League Championship Series (NLCS) but lost to the Baltimore Orioles in five games in the World Series.

Bench had another strong year in 1972, winning the MVP Award for a second time. He once again led the majors in home runs (40) and RBI (125) to help propel the Reds to another NL West Division title and won the NL pennant in the deciding fifth game over the Pittsburgh Pirates. One of his more dramatic home runs was likely his ninth-inning, lead off, opposite field home run in that fifth NLCS game. The solo shot tied the game at three; the Reds won later in the inning on a wild pitch, 4–3. The Cincinnati Enquirer later called that game one of the best in franchise history. However, the Reds lost the World Series to the Oakland Athletics in seven games.

After the 1972 season, Bench underwent surgery to remove a lesion from his lung, out of concern that it might be cancerous. The lesion was benign, but Bench stated in an interview that he was never the same player after the surgery. “They cut the ribs, they cut the bones, they cut the nerves, and so I never was the same player afterwards.” He remained productive but never again hit 40 home runs in a season.

In 1973, Bench hit 25 home runs and 104 RBI and helped the Reds rally from a 10 1/2-game deficit to the Los Angeles Dodgers in early July to lead the majors with 99 wins and claim another NL West crown. In the NLCS, Cincinnati met a New York Mets team that won the NL East with an unimpressive 82–79 (.509) record, 16 1/2 games behind the Reds. The Mets boasted three of the better starting pitchers in the NL, future Hall of Famer Tom Seaver, Jerry Koosman, and Jon Matlack. Bench's bottom of the ninth-inning home run off Seaver in the first game propelled the Reds to victory, but Seaver would get the best of the Reds and Bench in the deciding Game 5, winning 7–2 to put the Mets into the World Series.

In 1974, Bench led the league with 129 RBI and scored 108 runs, becoming only the fourth catcher in major league history with 100 or more runs and RBI in the same season. The Reds won the second-most games in the majors (98) but lost the West Division to the Los Angeles Dodgers. In 1975, the Reds finally broke through in the postseason. Bench had 28 home runs and 110 RBI during the regular season. Cincinnati swept the Pirates in three games to win the NLCS, and defeated the Boston Red Sox in a memorable seven-game World Series.

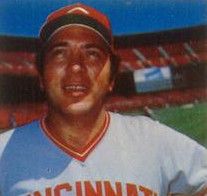
Bench in 1977

Bench struggled with ailing shoulders in 1976 and had one of his least productive years, with only 16 home runs and 74 RBI. He finished with an excellent postseason, starting with a 4-for-12 performance in the NLCS sweep over the Philadelphia Phillies. The World Series provided a head-to-head match-up with Yankees' All-Star catcher Thurman Munson. Bench rose to the occasion, hitting .533 with two home runs, while Munson also hit well, with a .529 average. The Reds won in a four-game sweep, and Bench was named the Series MVP. At the post-World Series press conference, Reds manager Sparky Anderson was asked to compare Munson with his catcher. Anderson replied, "I don't want to embarrass any other catcher by comparing him to Johnny Bench." Bench bounced back in 1977 to hit 31 home runs and 109 RBI but the Dodgers won two straight NL pennants. The Reds reached the postseason just once more in his career, in 1979, but were swept in three straight in the NLCS by Pittsburgh.

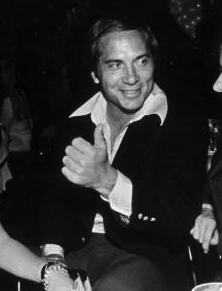
Bench circa 1980

=== 1980s: move to infield and retirement ===
For the last three seasons of his career, Bench moved out from behind the plate, catching only 13 games, while primarily becoming a corner infielder (first or third base). The Reds proclaimed September 17, 1983, "Johnny Bench Night" at Riverfront Stadium, in which he hit his 389th and final home run, a line drive to left in the third inning, before a record crowd. He retired at the end of the season at age 35.

== MLB career statistics ==
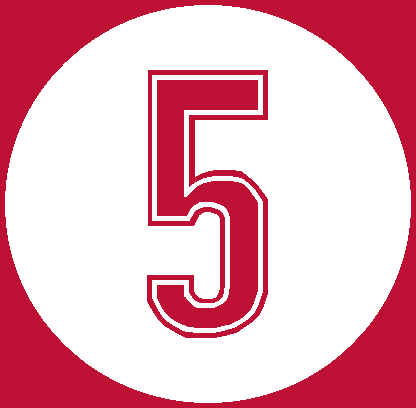
Johnny Bench's number 5 was retired by the Cincinnati Reds in 1984.

Bench had 2,048 hits for a .267 career batting average with 389 home runs and 1,376 RBI during his 17-year Major League career, all spent with the Reds. He retired as the career home run leader for catchers, a record which stood until surpassed by Carlton Fisk and the current record holder, Mike Piazza. In his career, Bench won 10 Gold Gloves, was named to the National League All-Star team 14 times, and won two Most Valuable Player awards. He led the National League three times in caught stealing percentage and ended his career with a .990 fielding percentage at catcher and an overall .987 fielding percentage. He caught 118 shutouts during his career, ranking him 12th all-time among major league catchers as of 2010. Bench also won the Lou Gehrig Award in 1975 for his philanthropic efforts, the Babe Ruth Award for his postseason performance in 1976, and the Hutch Award in 1981.

Bench popularized the hinged catcher's mitt, first introduced by Randy Hundley of the Chicago Cubs. He began using the mitt after a stint on the disabled list in 1966 for a thumb injury on his throwing hand. The mitt allowed Bench to tuck his throwing arm safely to the side when receiving the pitch. By the turn of the decade, the hinged mitt became standard catchers' equipment. Having huge hands (a famous photograph features him holding seven baseballs in his right hand), Bench also tended to block breaking balls in the dirt by scooping them with one hand instead of the more common way: dropping to both knees and blocking the ball using the chest protector to keep the ball in front.

== Legacy and post-playing career ==
Bench was elected to the National Baseball Hall of Fame in 1989, alongside Carl Yastrzemski. He was elected in his first year of eligibility, and appeared on 96% of the ballots, the third-highest percentage at that time. Three years earlier, Bench was inducted into both the National High School Hall of Fame and the Cincinnati Reds Hall of Fame, with the Reds also retiring his No. 5 jersey. In 1989, he became the first individual baseball player to appear on a Wheaties box, a cereal he ate as a child.

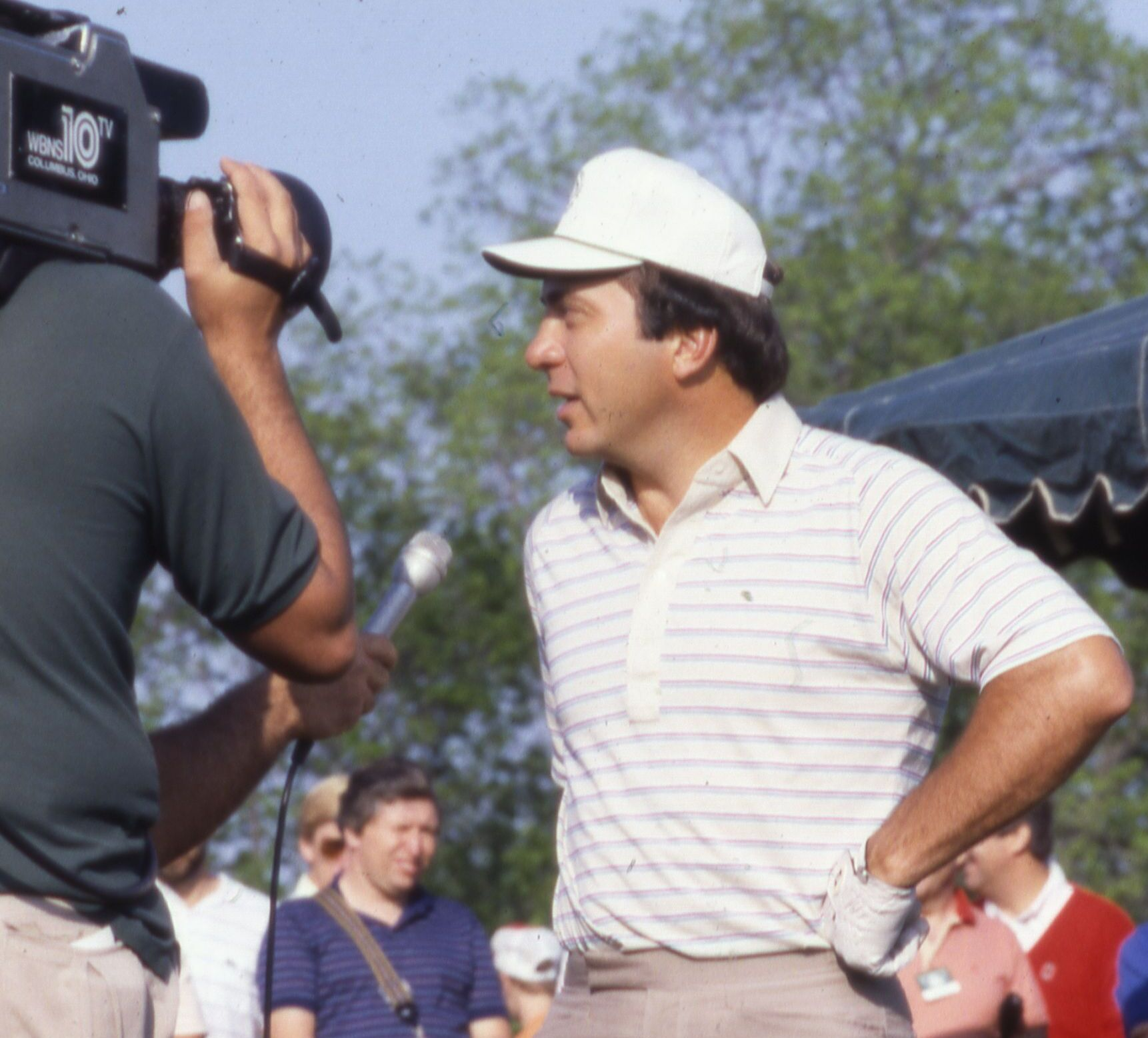
Bench at a 1984 golf tournament

After turning 50, Bench was a part-time professional golfer and played in several events on the Senior PGA Tour. He had a home at the Mission Hills-Gary Player Course in Rancho Mirage, California.

In 1999, Bench ranked 16th on The Sporting News list of the 100 Greatest Baseball Players. He was the highest-ranking catcher. Bench was also elected to the Major League Baseball All-Century Team as the top vote-receiving catcher. As part of the Golden Anniversary of the Rawlings Gold Glove Award, Bench was selected to the All-Time Rawlings Gold Glove Team.

From 2000 until 2018, the best college baseball catcher annually received the Johnny Bench Award. Winners included future MLB players Buster Posey, Kurt Suzuki, Kelly Shoppach, and Mike Zunino. The award was renamed the Buster Posey Award for the 2019 season onwards.

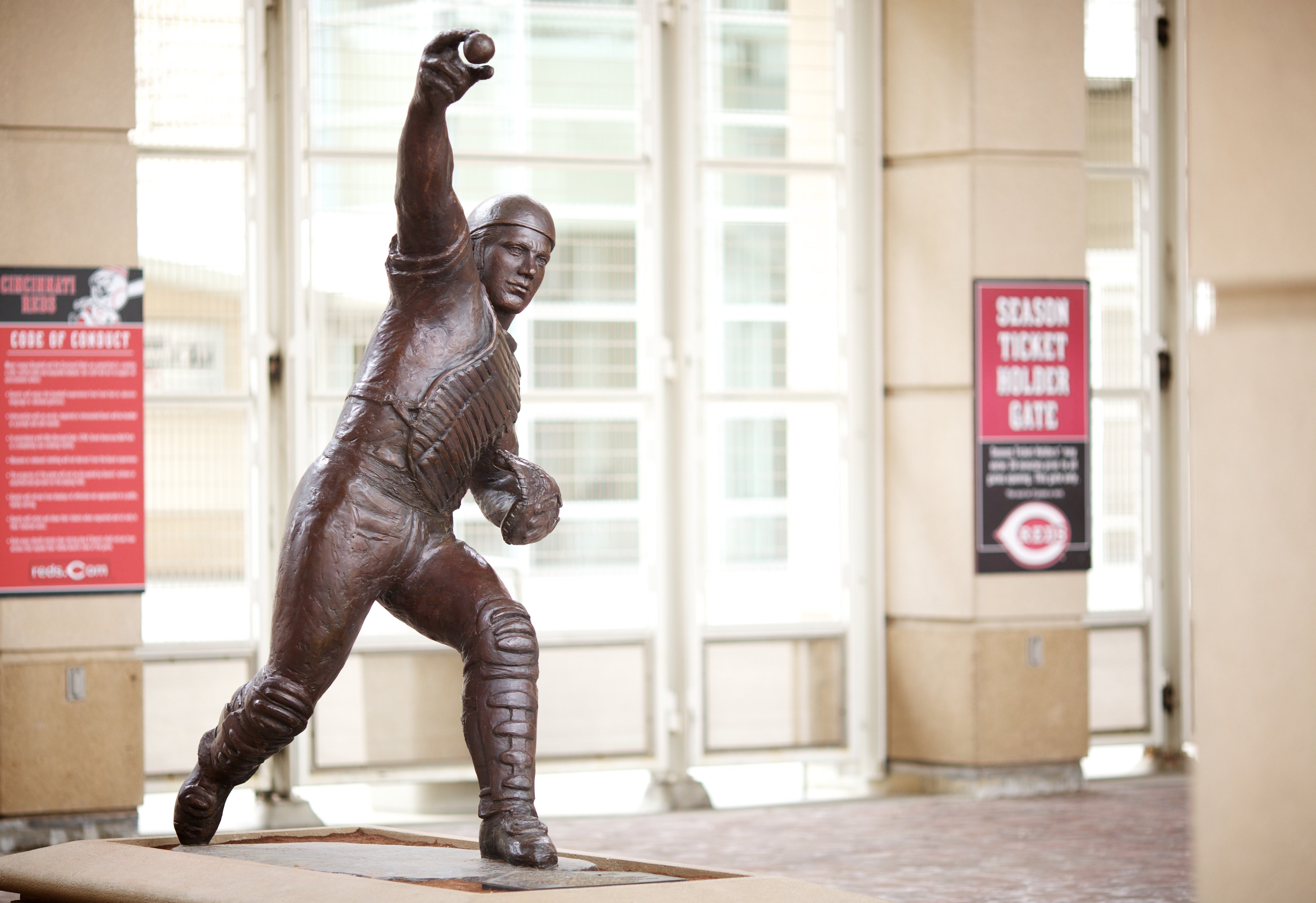
Bench's statue at Great American Ball Park

On September 17, 2011, the Reds unveiled a statue of Bench at the entrance way of the Reds Hall of Fame at Great American Ball Park. The larger-than-life bronze statue by Tom Tsuchiya shows Bench in the act of throwing out a base runner. Bench called the unveiling of his statue his "greatest moment".

In 2016, Bench was inducted into the International Sports Hall of Fame. He was also the Hall of Fame recipient of the Bob Feller Act of Valor Award in 2018, for his service and continued support of the United States military.

=== Broadcasting and media career ===
In 1986, Bench and Don Drysdale did the backup contests for ABC's Sunday afternoon baseball telecasts (Al Michaels and Jim Palmer were the primary commentating crew). Keith Jackson, usually working with Tim McCarver, did the No. 2 Monday night games. Bench took a week off in June (with Steve Busby filling in) and also worked one game with Michaels as the networks switched the announcer pairings. While Drysdale worked the All-Star Game in Houston as an interviewer, Bench did not resurface until the playoffs. Bench ultimately moved to CBS Radio to help Brent Musburger call that year's National League Championship Series. Bench would later serve as color commentator CBS Radio's World Series coverage alongside Jack Buck and later Vin Scully from 1989 to 1993. In 1994, Bench served as a field reporter for NBC/The Baseball Network's coverage of the All-Star Game in Pittsburgh. In 2001, Bench appeared on the "Sports Superstar Edition" of the game show Bench co-hosted a Cincinnati radio show with Reds broadcaster Marty Brennaman but quit in 2000 following Brennaman's Hall of Fame speech supporting Pete Rose's induction.

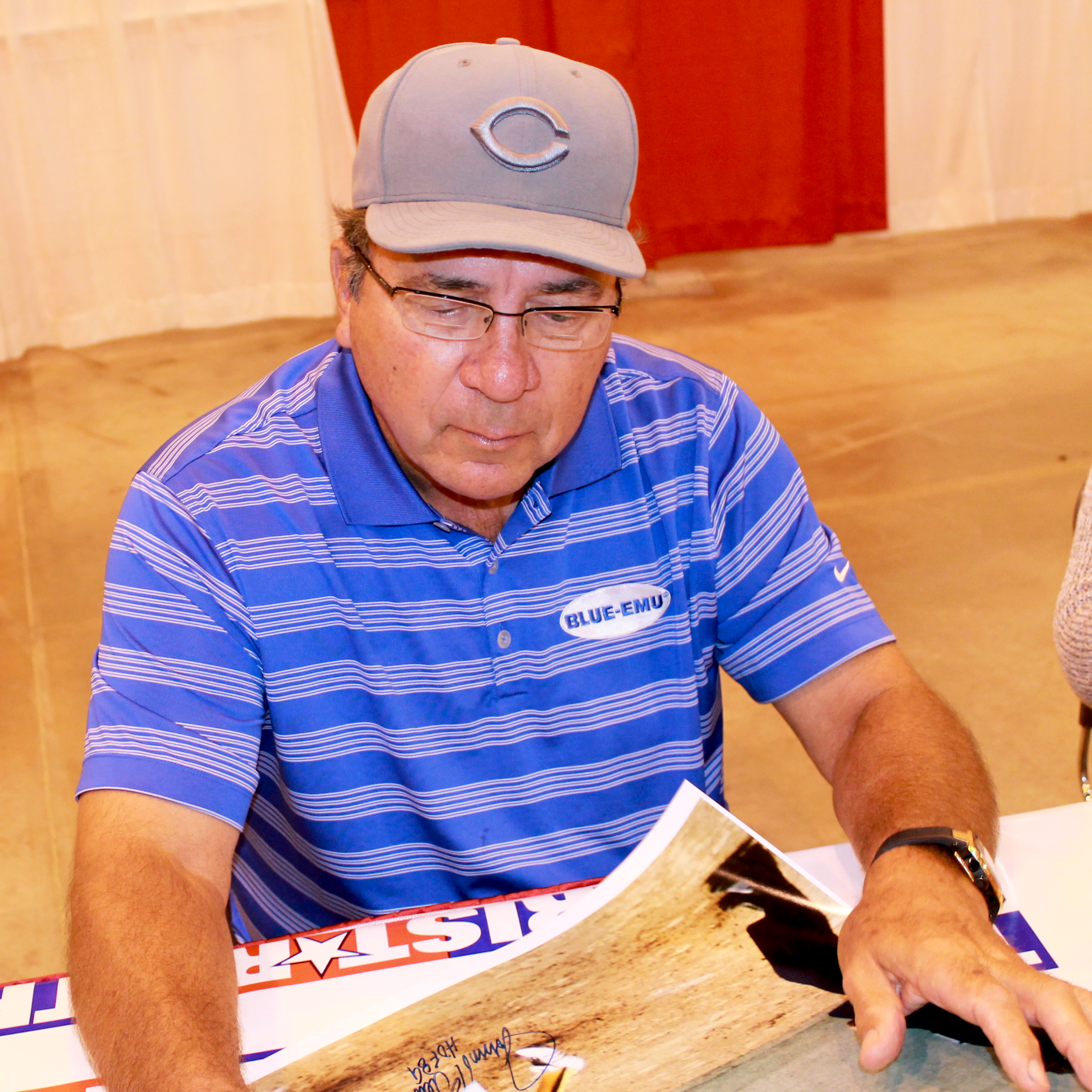
Bench signs autographs in Houston in May 2014.

Bench wrote several books. During his playing career, he wrote From Behind the Plate, published in 1972, the instructional book Catching and Power Hitting in 1975, and Catch You Later, an autobiography published in 1979 co-authored with William Brashler. In 1999, he wrote The Complete Idiot's Guide to Baseball. In 2008, he co-wrote Catch Every Ball: How to Handle Life's Pitches with Paul Daugherty.

Bench has acted several times, usually related to his baseball career. While still an active player, he made a cameo appearance as a Kings Island Inn poolside waiter in a Season 3 episode of The Partridge Family which first aired on January 26, 1973. Bench hosted the television series The Baseball Bunch from 1982 to 1985. In the show, Bench and other current and retired ballplayers would teach a cast of boys and girls from the Tucson, Arizona, area the fundamentals of baseball. The San Diego Chicken provided comic relief, and Los Angeles Dodgers manager Tommy Lasorda appeared as "The Dugout Wizard." In 1985, Bench starred as Joe Boyd/Joe Hardy in a Cincinnati stage production of the musical Damn Yankees, which also included Marge Schott, Jerry Springer, and Marty Brennaman. In 2001, Bench appeared on the "Sports Superstars Edition" of Who Wants to Be a Millionaire. In 2003, Bench guest starred on an episode of Yes, Dear as himself, along with Ernie Banks and Frank Robinson. Bench was a Savannah Bananas coach in a 2022 game.

Bench has also been a spokesperson in advertisements for several decades. In the 1980s, he was a spokesman for Krylon paint, featuring the catchphrases "I'm Johnny Bench, and this is Johnny Bench's bench" and "no runs, no drips, no errors" During his career, he also endorsed Fifth Third Bank and Gillette. Bench received a Stryker Corporation hip implant following his MLB career, and later went on to become a spokesperson for the company. He has also been a spokesperson for pain relief company Blue-Emu.

In an interview during a 2008 Boston Red Sox game with knuckleballer Tim Wakefield on the mound for the Red Sox, Bench related a story that Reds manager Sparky Anderson told him that he was thinking of trading for knuckleballer Phil Niekro. Bench replied that Anderson had better trade for Niekro's catcher, too.

== Career statistics ==
Season	Team	G	AB	H	HR	RBI	BB	SO	AVG	OBP	SLG	OPS
1967	CIN	26	86	14	1	6	5	19	.163	.207	.256	.462
1968	CIN	154	564	155	15	82	31	96	.275	.311	.433	.743
1969	CIN	148	532	156	26	90	49	86	.293	.353	.487	.840
1970	CIN	158	605	177	45	148	54	102	.293	.345	.587	.932
1971	CIN	149	562	134	27	61	49	83	.238	.299	.423	.722
1972	CIN	147	538	145	40	125	100	84	.270	.379	.541	.920
1973	CIN	152	557	141	25	104	83	83	.253	.345	.429	.774
1974	CIN	160	621	174	33	129	80	90	.280	.363	.507	.870
1975	CIN	142	530	150	28	110	65	108	.283	.359	.519	.878
1976	CIN	135	465	109	16	74	81	95	.234	.348	.394	.741
1977	CIN	142	494	136	31	109	58	95	.275	.348	.540	.889
1978	CIN	120	393	102	23	73	50	83	.260	.340	.483	.823
1979	CIN	130	464	128	22	80	67	73	.276	.364	.459	.824
1980	CIN	114	360	90	24	68	41	64	.250	.327	.483	.810
1981	CIN	52	178	55	8	25	17	21	.309	.369	.489	.858
1982	CIN	119	399	103	13	38	37	58	.258	.320	.396	.716
1983	CIN	110	310	79	12	54	24	38	.255	.308	.432	.741

== Personal life ==
Bench has been married five times. Once hailed as "baseball's most-eligible bachelor," he shed that distinction before the 1975 season when he married Vickie Chesser, a toothpaste model and the 1970 Miss South Carolina USA who had dated Joe Namath. Four days after they met, Bench proposed, and they were married on February 21, 1975. Quickly, the pair realized they were incompatible, especially after Bench suggested that his wife accept Hustler magazine's offer for her to pose nude for $25,000. They broke up at the end of the season (Bench reportedly said to her, "Now I'm done with two things I hate: baseball and you"), divorcing after just 13 months. "I tried. I even hand-squeezed orange juice," Chesser told Phil Donahue in December 1975. "I don't think either of us had any idea what marriage was really like." After returning to Manhattan, Chesser said, "Johnny Bench is a great athlete, a mediocre everything else, and a true tragedy as a person."

Before Christmas 1987, Bench married Laura Cwikowski, an Oklahoma City model and aerobics instructor. They had a son, Bobby Binger Bench (named after Bob Hope and Bobby Knight, and Bench's hometown), before divorcing in 1995. They shared custody of their son. "He was, and is, a great dad," according to Bobby, who works in Cincinnati as a production operator on Reds broadcasts. Bench married his third wife, Elizabeth Benton, in 1997. He filed for divorce in 2000 on grounds of marital infidelity. His fourth marriage took place in 2004, to 31-year-old Lauren Baiocchi, the daughter of pro golfer Hugh Baiocchi. After living in Palm Springs with their two sons, Bench wished to return to South Florida, where he lived from 2014 to 2017. However, she would not relocate to Florida, leading to their divorce. As of 2018, Bench has primary custody of their sons.

Bench was married for the fifth time in March 2024.

== See also ==
- Cincinnati Reds award winners and league leaders
- List of Gold Glove Award winners at catcher
- List of Major League Baseball annual home run leaders
- List of Major League Baseball annual runs batted in leaders
- List of Major League Baseball career hits leaders
- List of Major League Baseball career home run leaders
- List of Major League Baseball career intentional bases on balls leaders
- List of Major League Baseball career putouts as a catcher leaders
- List of Major League Baseball career runs batted in leaders
- List of Major League Baseball career runs scored leaders
- List of Major League Baseball retired numbers
- List of Major League Baseball players who spent their entire career with one franchise
- List of members of the Baseball Hall of Fame
- Sporting News Rookie of the Year Award
