= Lavr =

Lavr is a Russian masculine given name, a form of Laurus. The patronymic surname Lavrov is derived from it.

- Lavr Divomlikoff, pen name of Vladimir Volkoff
- Lavr Kornilov
- Lavr Proskuryakov

== See also ==
- Lavrentiy
