= Lau =

Lau or LAU may refer to:

== People ==
- Lau (surname)
- Liu (劉/刘), a common Chinese family name transliterated Lau in Cantonese and Hokkien
- Lau clan, one of the Saraswat Brahmin clans of Punjab
- LAU (musician), Laura Fares
- Lau Lauritzen Jr., Danish actor, screenwriter, and film director
- Lau Lauritzen Sr., Danish film director, screenwriter and actor

== Places ==
- Lebanese American University, a university in Lebanon
- Lau, Estonia, a village in Estonia
- Lau, Gotland, a locality on Gotland, Sweden
- Lau, Nigeria, a local government area
- Lau (crater), a crater on Mars
- Lau Islands, Fiji
- Lau Province, Fiji
- Laurel station (Mississippi), a passenger railway station in Laurel, United States
- LAU, IATA code for Manda Airport, a public airport on Manda Island, Kenya

== Languages ==
- Lau language of Nigeria
- Lauan language, also called Lau, spoken in Fiji, ISO 639-3: llx
- Lau language (Malaita), spoken in the Solomon Islands, ISO 639-3: llu

== Other uses ==
- Lau Chan, fictional character in video game Virtua Fighter Series
- Lau (band), a British folk music group
- Lambda Alpha Upsilon, a Greek letter intercollegiate fraternity
- Local administrative unit (see Nomenclature of Territorial Units for Statistics), a low level administrative division of a country, ranked below a province, region, or state
- Lẩu, Vietnamese hot pot
- Lauinger Library, the main library at Georgetown University, which is commonly known as "Lau"
- Leeds Arts University
- Lau Taveuni Rotuma (Open Constituency, Fiji), a former electoral division
- LAU, a United States military designator for aerial rocket launchers
- Liberal Alliances Ungdom (Liberal Alliance Youth)

== See also ==
- Iau (disambiguation)
