= Tenkula =

Tenkula is a surname. Notable people with the surname include:

- Jarno Tenkula (born 1982), Finnish footballer
- Miika Tenkula (1974–2009), Finnish musician
