= The Baseball Bunch =

American children's educational television series

- Genre: Educational sports comedy
- Starring: Johnny Bench; Tommy Lasorda; The San Diego Chicken
- Opening theme: "The Baseball Bunch"
- Country of origin: United States
- Original language: English
- No. of seasons: 5

Production
- Executive producers: Geoff Belinfante; Larry Parker
- Producers: Rich Domich; Jody Shapiro; Gary Cohen
- Production location: Tucson, Arizona
- Running time: 30 minutes
- Production company: Major League Baseball Productions

Original release
- Network: Syndicated
- Release: August 23, 1980 – 1985

The Baseball Bunch is an American educational children's television series that originally aired in broadcast syndication from August 23, 1980, through the fall of 1985. Produced by Major League Baseball Productions, the series is a 30-minute baseball-themed program that aired on Saturday mornings featuring a combination of comedy sketches and Major League guest-stars, intended to provide instructional tips to Little League aged children.

Throughout its five-season run, the series starred Johnny Bench, Tommy Lasorda and the San Diego Chicken alongside a group of eight children (boys and girls ranging in age from 8–14) as "The Bunch".

== Production ==
Produced by Major League Baseball Productions and starring Cincinnati Reds catcher Johnny Bench and Los Angeles Dodgers manager Tommy Lasorda, the series was envisioned as a fun but informative way for Little League aged children to learn the fundamentals of baseball. The original pilot for what would become The Baseball Bunch was filmed at Pepperdine University in Los Angeles in 1980, and did not originally include the San Diego Chicken (Ted Giannoulas). In a 2007 interview with JustMyShow.com, Giannoulas recounted how he became part of the series, saying "The producers called me up and they said 'We want to shoot this again. We think it's a little dry for kids to be watching this. A lot of good baseball information, but not enough color to it, so can you come in and just improvise around what we've done, and we'll re-shoot the whole thing.' I did that, and suddenly they had magic in the can, and they sold the show." The pilot, starring Bench, Lasorda, and major league guest-star Steve Garvey, aired as a "special" presentation on August 23, 1980 (with some stations airing it the next day instead).

As preparations for the first full season began, production for the series was moved to Tucson, Arizona to begin filming in February 1981. According to several cast-members, the location and time of year were selected for two main reasons; citing the ideal weather (70° temperatures in February), and Tucson's proximity to the major league's spring training camps, which accommodated the major league stars who could come in and film an episode during the month of February, then head directly over to their camps for spring training. Youngsters auditioned to be part of the original "Bunch" were selected from the Tucson, Arizona Little League as well as some brought in from talent agencies as far away as Phoenix, Arizona and Las Vegas, Nevada. The eight children ultimately chosen, boys and girls of varying ages and ethnicities, were selected for their "boy/girl-next-door" appeal, and to reflect the diversity of the intended audience, rather than for extraordinary athletic prowess or singing abilities (contrary to popular belief, the eight children who made up "The Bunch" did not sing the show's theme song). In his interview with JustMyShow.com, Giannoulas added, "I think they kinda were looking for kids that didn't have that polished 'Hollywood' look to them, that seemed more real and (would) come across as free and easier that way."

Filming each entire season within a three-week period during the month of February would become the standard production practice throughout the five season run of the series. Erik Lee ("Rick", seasons 1–4) recalled, "Each 30-minute episode took basically a day, so we would start early in the morning and just go all day. [...] We would film for a couple weeks at a time and (while filming) we would get out of school for a couple weeks at a time. It was glorious." While the Tucson location was selected specifically to accommodate the Major League players just prior to spring training, segments featuring Lasorda ("The Dugout Wizard") were filmed without him. Linda Coslett ("Kate", season 1) recalled, "We would pretend. We would look at this chalk-board that was blank, and then they would go back to Los Angeles and film it separately with Tommy and then plug him into the show. So Tommy Lasorda was never on the set.", with Erik Lee adding, "We never met (Lasorda), unfortunately." Departing from the traditional fall-through-spring television season, the first official season of The Baseball Bunch debuted in broadcast syndication on Saturday May 2, 1981, with new episodes airing throughout the summer months on Saturday mornings and/or early afternoons, usually either right before or right after the networks' line-ups of Saturday morning cartoons. Although airing in reruns year-round, the format of debuting each new season in the spring (April or May) and airing new episodes throughout the "summer vacation" season was used for all five seasons of the show's original run.

== Premise ==
Season 3 cast of The Baseball Bunch

The series starred Johnny Bench as the coach to a fictional baseball team of eight little league aged children known as "The Baseball Bunch". The ninth team member was "The San Diego Chicken" (played by Ted Giannoulas) who served as a comic foil to Bench as he would attempt to mentor the children. Each episode was divided into two segments. The first segment featured a current or former major league player demonstrating a baseball fundamental to the children (e.g., learning to pitch within a hitters' strike zone) as well as the children's sometimes humorous attempts to imitate the star. The Major League guest-stars would also serve to steer the children clear of what not to do (e.g., explaining why a growing child should not attempt to throw a curveball). The second segment featured a skit with "The Dugout Wizard" (played by Tommy Lasorda), a mystical turban wearing "Swami" character who taught a second baseball fundamental (e.g., how to catch a fly ball). This second instructional segment was often accompanied by a music video (a genre then in its embryonic stage), composed of clips of major league players either performing the act or failing at it-for instance, the episode which featured knuckleballer Phil Niekro mentions how difficult a knuckleball can be to catch and showed several clips of frustrated catchers trying to do so. In addition to the technical fundamentals of the game, the series would also touch on some of the psychological challenges youngsters face, including addressing performance anxieties (an adolescent boy's fears of not being "good enough" before a big game) and sportsmanship (a "little league father" criticizing his son unmercifully from the sidelines gently being urged to relax and enjoy the game).

== The Bunch ==
Throughout the show's five-season run, the series featured a rotating cast of eight children who starred as "The Bunch", usually ranging in age from eight to fourteen. As the youngsters entered adolescence and outgrew their roles, they would be replaced by younger children closer in age to the target audience. Linda Coslett ("Kate", season 1) said of her time on the series, "I was eleven (when the show started). I turned twelve actually during the month of February, during the filming, and I was on (the show) for one year. [...] As you know, women get mature during those years and (by the second season) I didn't look like a little girl anymore, so they wanted to go with somebody that was younger looking." Erik Lee ("Rick", seasons 1–4) said of his run on the series, "I was all of twelve years old when I started with The Baseball Bunch. I stayed with The Bunch for four incredible years, until my voice changed and I was taller than Johnny Bench." With a rotating cast that included new children every season, only three youngsters appeared as "Bunch" team-members for all five seasons; Stacy Blythe ("Michelle"), Jared Holland ("Sam") and Danny Santa Cruz ("Louie", sometimes credited as "Luis"). The children who appeared as "The Bunch" team-members at one time or another during the show's five-season run are, in alphabetical order:

- Stacy Blythe as Michelle
- David Cenko as Doug
- Linda Coslett as Kate
- Lance Crawford as Ossie
- Rolon Culver as Zack
- Hurst Dorman as Harold
- John Fordney as Sherman
- Priscilla Hassel as Debbie
- Jared Holland as Sam
- Erik Lee as Rick
- Jackie Masei as Jessie
- Tom McCabe as Andy
- John Podesta as Billy
- Danny Santa Cruz as Louie
- Eddy Tonai as Freddie
- Wendy Haralson as Krista

== Guest stars ==
With the rare exception of the occasional "Best Of" episode (which were composed of clips of previous episodes), most every episode featured a well-known guest-star from the major leagues brought in to mentor the children in their particular field of expertise and included many future Hall of Famers. Some of the major league guest-stars to appear on the series include, in alphabetical order:

- Sparky Anderson
- Dusty Baker
- George Brett
- Gary Carter
- Bill Caudill
- Andre Dawson
- Rick Dempsey
- Bucky Dent
- Rollie Fingers
- Joe Garagiola
- Steve Garvey
- Goose Gossage
- Keith Hernandez
- Al Hrabosky
- Chet Lemon
- Davey Lopes
- Ron Luciano
- Bill Madlock
- Gary Matthews
- Don Mattingly
- Tug McGraw
- Joe Morgan
- Graig Nettles
- Phil Niekro
- Sadaharu Oh
- Lou Piniella
- Dan Quisenberry
- Jim Rice
- Cal Ripken Jr.
- Frank Robinson
- Pete Rose
- Bill Russell
- Mike Schmidt
- Tom Seaver
- Ted Simmons
- Ken Singleton
- Ozzie Smith
- Willie Stargell
- Bruce Sutter
- Don Sutton
- Chuck Tanner
- Ted Williams

== Broadcasting ==
The Baseball Bunch aired in broadcast syndication, with local stations carrying the original run of the series from the spring of 1981 through the fall of 1985. During this time, the series also aired nationally on the basic cable network WTBS and, later, in reruns on ESPN.

== Reception ==
During its run, The Baseball Bunch was well received by children and adults alike. Throughout its five years on the air, the series won multiple Emmy Awards for outstanding achievement in special programming, a gold medal from the International Film and Tape Festival in New York, and an award from Action for Children's Television, as well as receiving an endorsement from the National Education Association. In its time, the series also spawned a fan club, (known as The Baseball Bunch "Fun Club"), which young fans of the show could join for a fee of $4.99. Members received a "membership certificate", a Baseball Bunch T-shirt and wrist-bands, a full-size color poster of "The Bunch", and The Baseball Bunch "Fun Book", which included color photos and biographies of Bench, Lasorda and the kids, puzzles, sheet music and lyrics for the show's theme song, and a comic strip known as "The Baseball Bunchies".

In his March 1984 review of the series, Miami Herald sports writer Bob Rubin praised the show, writing "'The Baseball Bunch' is a humorous, marvelously creative blend of entertainment and instruction. With the glut of dreck that passes for children's programming on the weekends, it's a breath of fresh air. And you don't have to be a kid or a baseball fan to enjoy it, either. [...] Serving as both participants and pupils is an eight-kid rainbow coalition that represents a typical neighborhood group. There are six boys and two girls, ranging in age from 9 to 14." Rubin also praised Giannoulas's contribution to the series, writing "The Chicken may be the most gifted physical comic since Curly, Larry and Moe. [...] It's a laugh and a lesson, which is SOP (standard operating procedure) on 'The Baseball Bunch'".

In a March 2001 Sports Illustrated article about his younger days, writer Mark Bechtel looked back fondly on his childhood memories of the series writing, "The first three letters of the word notwithstanding, there's very little fun in fundamentals. Still, the creators of Baseball Bunch, a half-hour TV program that aired in the early 1980s, made learning the game's intricacies a joy. Each week, host Johnny Bench was joined on a sandlot in Anywhere, U.S.A., by one of his big league buddies and a group of preteens. Tommy Lasorda, in his Dugout Wizard get-up complete with absurd turban, competed for laughs with the San Diego Chicken. The result was sublime Saturday-morning fare, equal parts Tom Emanski and Barney. [...] The Bunch didn't make me a major leaguer, but it did make a lasting impression — and I can proudly say that in my days as a Little League catcher, no runner ever absconded with second."

In his 2007 interview with JustMyShow.com, Ted Giannoulas recalled major league players also secretly enjoying the show, saying "That was a real highlight being on that program [...] During the show's existence, I had professional baseball players tell me that they would sneak a peek at the show and pick up tips because the information that Johnny and our guests would put on the show was very very good inside baseball information. [...] So I took that as a real compliment because it signified how credible and good the advice that Johnny and the players were giving, and that not only were kids picking up good advice, but I can attest that professional ball-players were also tuned in as well."

== Home video ==
After the series' original run ended in the Fall of 1985, Scholastic-Lorimar, along with the show's long-time sponsor Kool-Aid, released three one-hour "Best Of" VHS tapes in April 1986. Each tape was dedicated to a particular aspect of the game; "Pitching", "Hitting" and "Fielding", and compiled segments of various episodes from all five seasons. Hosted by Bench and the only three children to appear on all five seasons of the series; Stacy Blythe as "Michelle", Jared Holland as "Sam" and Danny Santa Cruz as "Louie", the three tapes also included new "Drill" segments, in which Bench would recommend basic drills young viewers could use to improve their game, while the three children (by that time, teens) demonstrated each exercise. As compilations of previous episodes, no segments of Lasorda as "The Dugout Wizard" were included on the videos, instead, the tapes focused exclusively on segments which had featured The Bunch with major league guest-stars. The tapes also did not include the show's well-known "The Baseball Bunch" theme song, replacing the opening and closing theme with an alternate instrumental version of the music.

== Revival series ==
Television producer, Steve Church created, directed and produced a local, St. Louis market version of The Baseball Bunch with the St. Louis Cardinals and then-team president, Mark Lamping. Church felt a modern-day version of the series could work and, in 2002 Church launched production of "The Cardinals Kids Club", which still airs on Bally Sports Midwest.

Several years later Church went on to produce and directed an 8-minute pilot for a new national version of the series for ESPN. The unaired pilot was filmed in Williamsport, Pennsylvania and Los Angeles, California starred Harold Reynolds as the mentor and Philadelphia Phillies mascot The Phillie Phanatic, as well as cameo appearances by Jimmy Kimmel, J. K. Simmons, Roy Firestone, Scott Rolen, José Lima, Fernando Valenzuela and Bobcat Goldthwait. However, ESPN eventually "shelved" the project.

Church began development on another Baseball Bunch, this time under a production shingle CG Entertainment Partners with actor John Goodman, This re-boot still has an MLB star as host and Phillie Phanatic, alongside a new cast of kids. In describing his vision for the premise of the show, Church stated "We're still going to have that Big guest star and the big League tip as the narrative". The host's friends come on the show and teach the kids how to play the game. Those elements will still be there." (2016) WME/IMG Sports went into contract with Church repped by The Dravis Agency in Studio City, California, (properties include Hunger Games, Hugo) the IMG development deal expired. Development is underway for the reboot of the Baseball Bunch with Church and MVP Sports Group. Albert Pujols is rumored to host, along with the Phillie Phanatic. Sources close to the project say MLB sees the Baseball Bunch Series as a launch to expand its ancillary programming of its new MLB broadcast and streaming deals.
