= Laur (surname) =

Family name

- Gender: Male

Origin
- Origin: Latin nomen Laurentius
- Region of origin: Estonia

Laur is an Estonian surname, the 50th most popular.

Notable people with the surname include:

- Jarno Laur (born 1975), politician
- Kaspar Laur (born 2000), footballer
- Katrin Laur (born 1955), film director, producer and scenarist
- Mati Laur (born 1955), historian
- Tiido Laur (1882–1930), politician and archivist
- Uno Laur (born 1961), musician
- Ferdinand Samuel Laur (1791–1854), Swiss composer, conductor, choirmaster, and music teacher

== See also ==
- Lauer (surname)
- Lau (disambiguation)
- Laura – Laure – Lauri – Lauro – Laurus
