= Lauer =

Lauer is a surname. Notable people with the surname include:

- Andrew Lauer (born 1965), American filmmaker
- Bonnie Lauer (born 1951), American golfer
- Brad Lauer (born 1966), Canadian ice hockey coach
- Bruno Lauer (born 1965), American professional wrestling manager known as Harvey Wippleman
- Christof Lauer (born 1953), German jazz saxophonist
- Chuck Lauer (1865–1915), American baseball player
- Dutch Lauer (1898–1978), American football player
- Edgar J. Lauer (1871–1948), American lawyer and judge
- Edward Lauer, American athletic director, 1929–1934
- Eric Lauer (born 1995), American baseball player
- Franz von Lauer (1736–1803), Austrian military officer
- Fred Lauer (1898–1960), American water polo player
- Frederick Lauer (1810–1883), American brewer
- Georgius Lauer, German printer in the late fifteenth century
- Gerhard Lauer (born 1962), German literary scholar
- Heather Lauer, American writer
- Hilde Lauer (born 1943), Romanian sprint canoer
- Jean-Philippe Lauer (1902–2001), French architect and Egyptologist
- Karl Fritz Lauer (1938–2018) German-Romanian agriculturalist
- Klaus Lauer (born 1950), German neuroepidemologist
- Larry Lauer (1927–1992), American football player
- Len Lauer, American businessman
- Martin Lauer (1937–2019), West German sprinter
- Matt Lauer (born 1957), American television journalist
- Paul Lauer (born 1962), American entrepreneur and author
- Peter Lauer, American music video and television director
- Sandra Ann Lauer (born 1962), German pop singer known as Sandra
- Tod R. Lauer (born 1957), American astronomer
- Tony Lauer (born 1935), Australian police commissioner
- Walter E. Lauer (1893–1966), American military officer

== See also ==
- Bob deLauer (1920–2002), American football player
- Laur (surname), an Estonian name
