= Rick Shaw (Canadian football) =

American football player (1946–2025)

No. 27, 17
- Positions: Defensive back, wide receiver

Personal information
- Born: October 20, 1946; San Diego, California, U.S.
- Died: October 7, 2025 (aged 78); Mesa, Arizona, U.S.
- Listed height: 6 ft 4 in (1.93 m)
- Listed weight: 215 lb (98 kg)

Career information
- High school: Herbert Hoover (San Diego)
- College: Arizona State
- NFL draft: 1969: 6th round, 152nd overall pick

Career history
- Calgary Stampeders (1968–1969); Dallas Cowboys (1970)*; Philadelphia Eagles (1970)*; Winnipeg Blue Bombers (1970–1971); Hamilton Tiger-Cats (1972)
- * Offseason or practice squad member only

Awards and highlights
- Grey Cup champion (1972); CFL West All-Star (1970); Second-team All Conference Defense Back Arizona State

Lance Richard Shaw (October 20, 1946 – October 7, 2025) was an American professional football player who was a defensive back and wide receiver in the Canadian Football League (CFL) for the Calgary Stampeders, Winnipeg Blue Bombers and Hamilton Tiger-Cats. He played college football for the Arizona State Sun Devils.

== Early life ==
Shaw attended Herbert Hoover High School, where he was a starter at quarterback. He accepted a football scholarship from Colorado. He transferred after his freshman season to Arizona State University.

As a junior, he was a backup at quarterback behind John Goodman, registering 45 attempts for 15 completions, 242 passing yards and one touchdown. As a senior, he was a backup at quarterback behind Ed Roseborough, completing 17-of-31 passes for 275 yards and 2 touchdowns.

During his time at Arizona State, he also played as a flanker and defensive back. He elected to forgo his senior season to play for the Calgary Stampeders in the Canadian Football League.

== Professional career ==
In 1968, he signed as a free agent with the Calgary Stampeders of the Canadian Football League, where he was a starter at defensive back. As a rookie, he played wide receiver in one game, finishing with 2 touchdown receptions and one fumble returned for a touchdown. He had 6 interceptions in 2 seasons.

Shaw was selected by the Dallas Cowboys in the sixth round (152nd overall) of the 1969 NFL/AFL draft, with the intention of playing him at tight end. On October 31, 1969, he was released by the Stampeders so he could join the NFL in June 1970.

The Cowboys waived him on August 11, 1970. In August, he signed with the Philadelphia Eagles as a defensive back. He was cut on September 2.

In September 1970, he signed as a free agent with the Winnipeg Blue Bombers after a five-day tryout. He became a starter at wide receiver, recording 33 receptions for 538 yards and 2 touchdowns, while receiving CFL West All-Star honors. He was released on September 24, 1971.

On May 24, 1972, he signed with the Hamilton Tiger-Cats. He had 3 interceptions as a starter at defensive back, while helping the team win the 60th Grey Cup. He announced his retirement on June 19, 1973.

== Death ==
Shaw died in Mesa, Arizona, on October 7, 2025, at the age of 78.
