= Lauro (disambiguation) =

Lauro is a town in Italy.

Lauro may also refer to:

- Lauro, an ancient town in Hispania that has been identified by some historians as modern-day Lora de Estepa
- Achille Lauro (1887–1982), Italian businessman and politician
- Achille Lauro (born 1990), Italian singer-songwriter and rapper
- Antonio Lauro (1917–1986), Venezuelan guitar player and composer
- Antonio Lauro (bishop) (died 1609), Italian Roman Catholic bishop
- Lauro (footballer, born 1973), Lauro Antonio Ferreira da Silva, Brazilian football midfielder
- Lauro (footballer, born 1980), Lauro Júnior Batista da Cruz, Brazilian football goalkeeper
- Lauro De Bosis (1901–1931), Italian poet, aviator and anti-fascist
- Lauro de Mello (born 1944), Brazilian football midfielder
- MS Achille Lauro, cruise ship launched in 1946

== See also ==
- Laur (surname)
