= Laureys =

Laureys may refer to:

- Steven Laureys, Belgian neurologist
- Jimmy Laureys, Belgian powerlifter and strongman competitor
- Laureys a Castro, Flemish painter of marine views and portraits

== See also ==
- Laurey (disambiguation)
