= Lauret =

Lauret may refer to

- Lauret (surname), people with this name

the following places in France:

- Lauret, Hérault, a commune in the Hérault department
- Lauret, Landes, a commune in the Landes department

Other:

- Lysiane Lauret Challenge, a former figure skating competition in France
- Château des Laurets, a wine estate in Bordeaux
