= Tommy Lasorda =

American baseball player and manager (1927–2021)

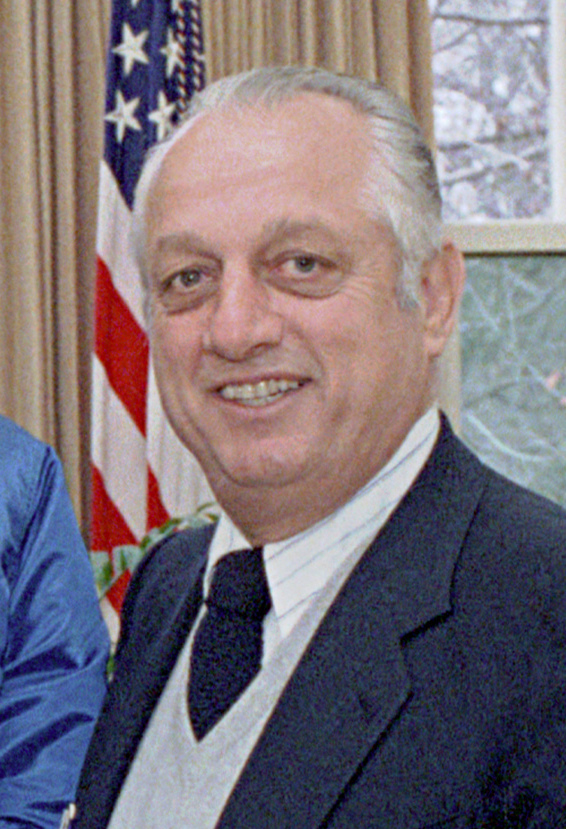
- Lasorda at the White House in 1981
- Pitcher / Manager
- Born: September 22, 1927; Norristown, Pennsylvania, U.S.
- Died: January 7, 2021 (aged 93); Fullerton, California, U.S.
- Batted: Left Threw: Left

MLB debut
- August 5, 1954, for the Brooklyn Dodgers

Last MLB appearance
- July 8, 1956, for the Kansas City Athletics

MLB statistics
- Win–loss record: 0–4
- Earned run average: 6.48
- Strikeouts: 37
- Managerial record: 1,599–1,439–2
- Winning %: .526
- Stats at Baseball Reference
- Managerial record at Baseball Reference

Teams
- As player: Brooklyn Dodgers (1954–1955); Kansas City Athletics (1956); As manager: Los Angeles Dodgers (1976–1996); As coach: Los Angeles Dodgers (1973–1976)

Career highlights and awards
- 2× World Series champion (1981, 1988); 2× NL Manager of the Year (1983, 1988); Los Angeles Dodgers No. 2 retired

Member of the National

Baseball Hall of Fame
- Induction: 1997
- Election method: Veterans Committee
Medals
Men's baseball
Representing the United States
Summer Olympics
| Gold medal – first place | 2000 Sydney | Team |

Thomas Charles Lasorda (September 22, 1927 – January 7, 2021) was an American professional baseball pitcher and manager. He managed the Los Angeles Dodgers of Major League Baseball (MLB) from 1976 through 1996. He was inducted into the National Baseball Hall of Fame as a manager in 1997.

Lasorda played in MLB for the Dodgers in 1954 and 1955 and for the Kansas City Athletics in 1956. He coached for the Dodgers from 1973 through 1976 before taking over as manager. Lasorda won two World Series championships as manager of the Dodgers and was named the Manager of the Year of the National League (NL) twice. His uniform number 2 was retired by the Dodgers.

== Early life ==
Thomas Charles Lasorda was born on September 22, 1927, in Norristown, Pennsylvania, a suburb of Philadelphia. He graduated from Norristown High School in 1944, where he excelled in baseball.

== Professional career ==
=== Minor leagues ===
Lasorda signed with the Philadelphia Phillies as an amateur free agent in 1945 and began his professional career that season with the Concord Weavers of the Class D North Carolina State League. He missed the 1946 and 1947 seasons because of a stint in the United States Army. He served on active duty from October 1945 until spring 1947. Lasorda returned to baseball in 1948 with the Schenectady Blue Jays of the Canadian–American League. On May 31, 1948, he struck out 25 Amsterdam Rugmakers in a 15-inning game, setting a professional record, and drove in the winning run with a single. He played with Schenectady from 1948 through 1950.

Lasorda then played for Almendares of the Cuban League in Havana, Cuba in 1950–52 and again in 1958–60, compiling a 16–13 record in four seasons, including 8–3 with a 1.89 ERA in 1958–59. Lasorda also pitched for Marianao, a league rival of Almendares also in the Havana area.

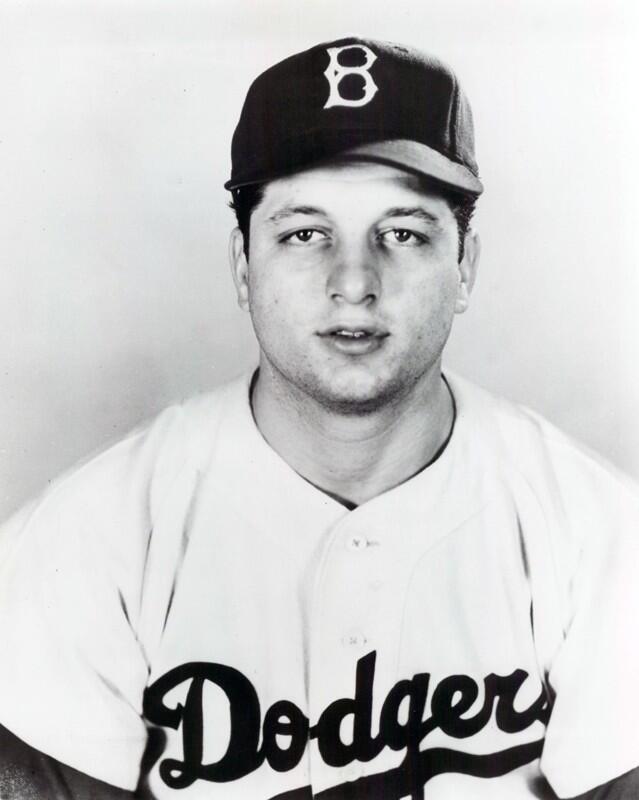
Lasorda with the Brooklyn Dodgers in 1954, his rookie season

The Brooklyn Dodgers drafted Lasorda from the Phillies organization in 1949. The Dodgers sent him to the Greenville Spinners in 1949, and to the Montreal Royals of the International League in 1950. He pitched for Montreal in 1950 through 1954.

=== Brooklyn Dodgers (1954–1955) ===
Lasorda made his Major League debut on August 5, 1954, for the Brooklyn Dodgers. He made his only start for the Dodgers on May 5, 1955, but was removed after the first inning after tying a major-league record with three wild pitches in one inning and being spiked by Wally Moon of the St. Louis Cardinals when Moon scored on the third wild pitch. Lasorda made only three more appearances for the Dodgers, was optioned back to Montreal on June 8, and was replaced on the major league roster by Sandy Koufax.

=== Kansas City Athletics (1956) ===
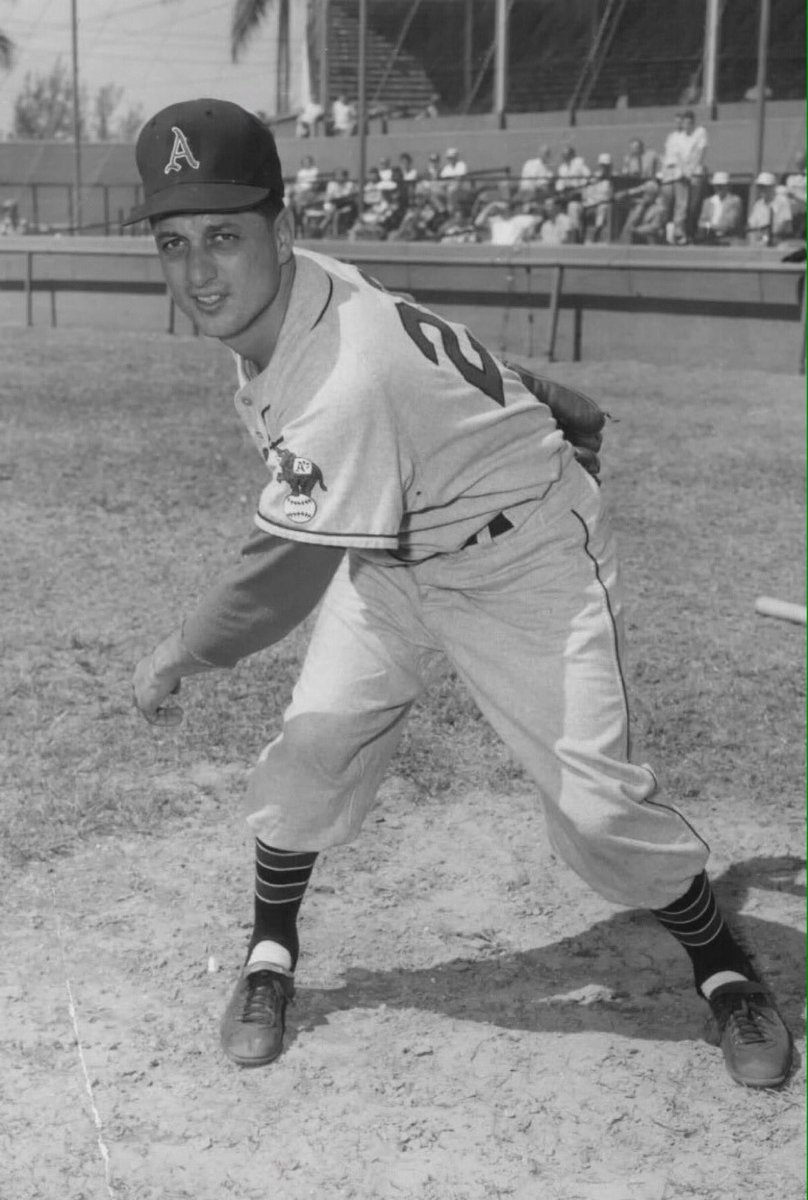
Lasorda with the Kansas City Athletics in 1956

Before the 1956 season, Lasorda was sold to the Kansas City Athletics, Kansas City traded him to the New York Yankees for Wally Burnette in July 1956. He appeared in 22 games for the Yankees' affiliate Triple-A Denver Bears in 1956–1957, and then was sold back to the Dodgers in 1957. During his tenure with the Bears, Lasorda was profoundly influenced by Denver manager Ralph Houk, who became Lasorda's role model for a major league manager.

"Ralph taught me that if you treat players like human beings, they will play like Superman," he told Bill Plaschke in the biography I Live for This: Baseball's Last True Believer. "He taught me how a pat on a shoulder can be just as important as a kick in the butt."

Lasorda returned to Montreal for the 1958 through 1960 seasons, but was released in July 1960. He was the winningest pitcher in the history of the team (107–57). On June 24, 2006, he was inducted into the Canadian Baseball Hall of Fame. He ended his major league career with a 0–4 record and a 6.52 ERA in 26 games.

== Coaching career ==
=== Minor leagues ===
Al Campanis, the Dodgers' scouting director, hired Lasorda as a scout in 1960. In 1966, he became the manager of the Pocatello Chiefs in the rookie leagues, then managed the Ogden Dodgers from 1966 to 1968. To inspire confidence in his players at Ogden, he would have each of them write a letter to the LA Dodger that played their position everyday in the big leagues, informing the regular that they would be replacing him one day. He became the Dodgers' AAA Pacific Coast League manager in 1969 with the Spokane Indians. He remained manager of the AAA team when it became the Albuquerque Dukes in 1972. His 1972 Dukes team won the PCL Championship.

Lasorda also managed in the Latin American winter leagues. He led the Dominican Republic team Tigres del Licey to back-to-back LIDOM titles, as well as a Caribbean Series title at the 1973 edition in Venezuela.

=== Dodgers' third-base coach ===
In 1973, Lasorda became the third-base coach on the staff of Hall of Fame manager Walter Alston, serving four seasons. He was widely regarded as Alston's heir apparent and turned down several major league managing jobs elsewhere to remain in the Dodger fold. He later returned to the third-base coach's box on a temporary basis while managing the Dodgers.

== Managerial career ==
=== Los Angeles Dodgers (1976–1996) ===
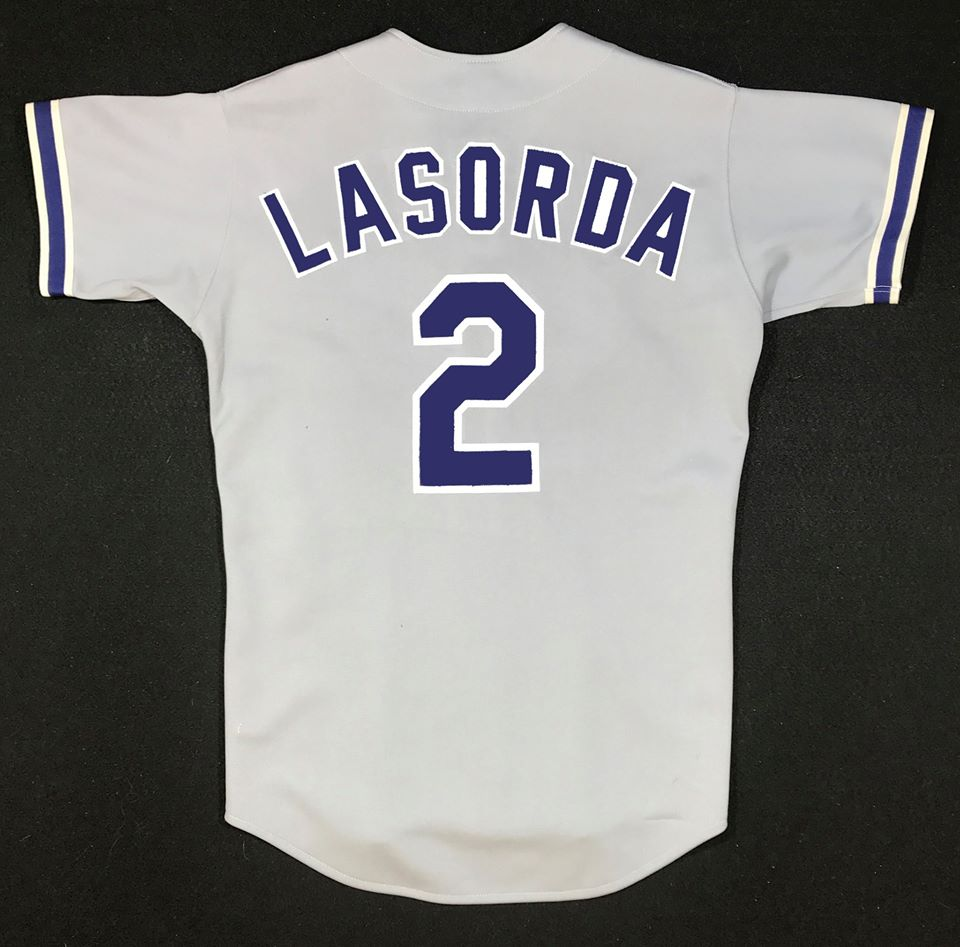
1980 Los Angeles Dodgers #2 Tommy Lasorda road jersey

Lasorda became the Los Angeles Dodgers manager September 29, 1976, upon Alston's retirement. When asked by broadcaster Vin Scully if he felt any pressure replacing Alston, Lasorda responded, "No, Vin, I'm worried about the guy who's gonna replace me. That's the guy who's gonna have it tough." He managed the final four games of the 1976 season. Lasorda oversaw the remainder of the historic Dodger infield, which started on a regular basis from 1973 to 1981.

The 1981 Major League Baseball season saw a unique split-season setup in which the leaders of each division at the time of the strike (which lasted from June to July) guaranteed them a playoff spot. The Dodgers, as champions of the first half (by less than a game over Cincinnati), would be matched up against whoever led the NL West after the season re-started. The Dodgers were matched against the Houston Astros, who narrowly beat out the Reds to win the West and play in a National League Division Series. The Astros took the first two games on walk off plays where the Dodgers scored one total run combined. But with three games remaining all in Dodger Stadium, Los Angeles would turn the tables and dominate in pitching (holding Houston to two runs combined) to win three straight and reach the NLCS. In the best-of-five 1981 National League Championship Series, the Dodgers would split the two games in Los Angeles before having to go to Montreal for the next three. They decisively won in Game 4 to stave off elimination before Rick Monday hit a go-ahead home run in the ninth inning to deliver a 2-1 victory in Game 5 to win the series.

A fiery motivator, Lasorda was known for firing up his players when the moment could come up, such as his tirade prior to Game 4 of the 1988 World Series when NBC broadcaster Bob Costas praised the Dodger pitching but criticized the batting as one of the worst seen, with Lasorda exclaiming to the clubhouse, "You hear what Costas said? He said you're the worst offensive team ever!" The Dodgers, labeled as underdogs against the favored Oakland Athletics, proceeded to win the Series in five games.

Lasorda managed nine players who won the NL Rookie of the Year Award. The winners came in two strings of consecutive players. From 1979 to 1982, he managed Rick Sutcliffe, Steve Howe, Fernando Valenzuela, and Steve Sax. From 1992 to 1995, he managed Eric Karros, Mike Piazza, Raúl Mondesí, and Hideo Nomo. Before retiring during the 1996 season, he had also managed that year's eventual winner, Todd Hollandsworth. Lasorda's final game was a 4–3 victory over the Houston Astros, at Dodger Stadium, on June 23, 1996. The following day, he drove himself to the hospital complaining of abdominal pain, and in fact was having a heart attack. Former shortstop Bill Russell would take the reins of the team on an interim basis. He received a clean bill of health from his doctor, but he took into account seeing Don Drysdale die in a hotel room a few years prior with a similar ailment, stating "I got to thinking about my little 9-month-old granddaughter, and how I'd like to be around when she goes to school." On July 29, Lasorda formally announced his retirement, thus making Russell only the third man to manage the Dodgers in 43 years.

Lasorda compiled a 1,599–1,439 record as Dodgers manager, won two World Series championships (1981 and 1988), four National League pennants, and eight division titles in his 20-year career as the Dodgers manager. His 16 wins in 30 NLCS games were the most of any manager at the time of his retirement. He also managed in four All-Star games. His 1,599 career wins rank 22nd all-time, and only two other managers have as many wins with one team: Alston and Mike Scioscia, with the latter playing under Lasorda.

At the time of his retirement, one was quoted as saying, "It's tough playing for Tommy. It's like you're playing for two different things. It's like you're playing for the Dodgers and you're playing for Tommy, too. It's hard to explain, but it's just a different atmosphere."

=== After managing the Dodgers ===
Lasorda was named vice president of the Dodgers upon his retirement from managing in 1996. On June 22, 1998, he became interim general manager upon the firing of Fred Claire. After the season, he helped find a permanent replacement for Claire and was made senior vice president of the Dodgers.

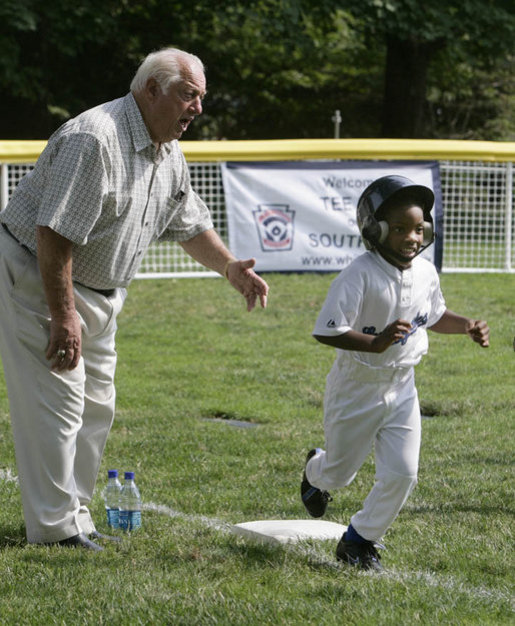
Tommy Lasorda at White House Tee Ball Initiative in 2007

Lasorda came out of retirement to manage the U.S. national team at the 2000 Summer Olympics in Sydney, Australia. He led the Americans to the gold medal, beating favored Cuba, which had won the gold medal at the prior two Olympics. In doing so, he became the first manager to win a World Series championship and lead a team to Olympic gold. Lasorda coached the 2001 All-Star Game as third base coach. While at the plate, Vladimir Guerrero broke his bat while swinging and it flew towards Lasorda, causing him to fall backwards. Lasorda was unharmed.

Following the sale of the Dodgers to Frank McCourt in 2004, Lasorda was appointed special advisor to the chairman, where his responsibilities included scouting, evaluating, and teaching minor league players, acting as an advisor and ambassador for the Dodgers' international affiliations, and representing the Dodgers in public appearances and speaking engagements.

During spring training in 2008, the Dodgers were invited to play a series of exhibition games in Taiwan. Dodgers manager Joe Torre took a group of players with him for that series. The majority of the team remained behind in Florida to finish out the Grapefruit League season. Lasorda briefly came out of retirement to manage the team that remained in Florida.

In 2011, an unnamed Dodger executive came up with the idea of having Dodger manager Don Mattingly ask Lasorda to be an honorary coach on his 84th birthday, against the San Francisco Giants.

== Managerial statistics ==
| Team | Year | Regular season | | | | | Postseason | | | |
| Team | Year | Games | Won | Lost | Pct. | Games | Won | Lost | Pct. | Notes |
|---|---|---|---|---|---|---|---|---|---|---|
| LAD* | 1976 | 4 | 2 | 2 | .500 | 2nd in NL West | – | – | – | – |
| LAD | 1977 | 162 | 98 | 64 | .605 | 1st in NL West | 5 | 5 | .500 | Lost World Series (NYY) |
| LAD | 1978 | 162 | 95 | 67 | .586 | 1st in NL West | 5 | 5 | .500 | Lost World Series (NYY) |
| LAD | 1979 | 162 | 79 | 83 | .488 | 3rd in NL West | – | – | – | – |
| LAD | 1980 | 163 | 92 | 71 | .564 | 2nd in NL West | – | – | – | – |
| LAD | 1981 | 57 | 36 | 21 | .632 | 1st in NL West | 10 | 6 | .625 | Won World Series (NYY) |
| LAD | 1981 | 53 | 27 | 26 | .509 | 1st in NL West | 10 | 6 | .625 | Won World Series (NYY) |
| LAD | 1982 | 162 | 88 | 74 | .543 | 2nd in NL West | – | – | – | – |
| LAD | 1983 | 163 | 91 | 71 | .562 | 1st in NL West | 1 | 3 | .250 | Lost NLCS (PHI) |
| LAD | 1984 | 162 | 79 | 83 | .488 | 4th in NL West | – | – | – | – |
| LAD | 1985 | 162 | 95 | 67 | .586 | 1st in NL West | 2 | 4 | .333 | Lost NLCS (STL) |
| LAD | 1986 | 162 | 73 | 89 | .451 | 5th in NL West | – | – | – | – |
| LAD | 1987 | 162 | 73 | 89 | .451 | 4th in NL West | – | – | – | – |
| LAD | 1988 | 162 | 94 | 67 | .584 | 1st in NL West | 8 | 4 | .667 | Won World Series (OAK) |
| LAD | 1989 | 160 | 77 | 83 | .481 | 4th in NL West | – | – | – | – |
| LAD | 1990 | 162 | 86 | 76 | .531 | 2nd in NL West | – | – | – | – |
| LAD | 1991 | 162 | 93 | 69 | .574 | 2nd in NL West | – | – | – | – |
| LAD | 1992 | 162 | 63 | 99 | .389 | 6th in NL West | – | – | – | – |
| LAD | 1993 | 162 | 81 | 81 | .500 | 4th in NL West | – | – | – | – |
| LAD | 1994 | 114 | 58 | 56 | .509 | 1st in NL West | No postseason due to players strike | | | |
| LAD | 1995 | 144 | 78 | 66 | .542 | 1st in NL West | 0 | 3 | .000 | Lost NLDS (CIN) |
| LAD | 1996 | 76 | 41 | 35 | .539 | Resigned* | – | – | – | – |
| LAD total | | 3040 | 1599 | 1439 | .526 | | 31 | 30 | .508 | |
| Total | | 3040 | 1599 | 1439 | .526 | | 31 | 30 | .508 | |

*Interim Manager

=== Honors and awards ===
Tommy Lasorda's number 2 was retired by the Los Angeles Dodgers in 1997.

Lasorda was inducted into the Baseball Hall of Fame in 1997 as a manager in his first year of eligibility. The Dodgers retired his uniform number (2) on August 15, 1997 and renamed a street in Dodgertown as "Tommy Lasorda Lane". In 2014, a new restaurant named "Lasorda's Trattoria" opened at Dodger Stadium.

- The Sporting News Minor League Manager of the Year (1970)
- UPI and Associated Press (AP) Manager of the Year (1977)
- AP Manager of the Year (1981)
- AP and Baseball America Manager of the Year (1988)
- Sporting News Co-Manager of the Year (1988)
- Amos Alonzo Stagg Coaching Award presented by the United States Sports Academy (2000)
- Minor planet 6128 Lasorda was named in his honor.
- Bob Feller Act of Valor Award 2014 National Baseball Hall of Fame winner.

The University of Pennsylvania's baseball field was named after Lasorda in 2020.

== Public persona ==
Lasorda was famous for his colorful personality and outspoken opinions regarding players and other personnel associated with baseball. He had a number of obscenity-filled tirades, some of which were taped and became underground classics, like his explosion over Kurt Bevacqua in 1982. The most famous of these is his "Dave Kingman tirade" in 1978, in which Lasorda ranted at reporter Paul Olden, who asked him about Kingman hitting three home runs against the Dodgers that day.

He was also known for being fiercely loyal to his players. He explained in an essay he wrote for Tim McCarver's compilation volume Diamond Gems that he wanted to break a mold by ending a longstanding unspoken taboo against managers socializing with their players off the field. He felt it made players even more loyal to him if they saw him as a friend as well. He also said that he made it his business to know the names of all of his players' wives and children and to ask about them regularly, another characteristic that endeared him to his players for many years.

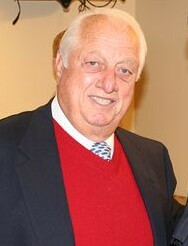
Lasorda in 2005

In 1996, Lasorda voiced the role of Lucky Lasorta, a Black and White Havanese commentating the baseball game in the film Homeward Bound II: Lost in San Francisco. He made a cameo appearance in the movie Ladybugs (1992) alongside comedian Rodney Dangerfield. Lasorda portrayed the Dugout Wizard in the syndicated children's television show The Baseball Bunch. His other television credits playing himself include Silver Spoons, Who's the Boss?, CHiPs, Hart to Hart, Fantasy Island, Police Squad!, Hee Haw, Simon & Simon, Everybody Loves Raymond, and American Restoration.

Lasorda partially owned the food company Lasorda Foods, which was known primarily for pasta sauces that Lasorda stated were based on a family recipe passed down to his wife, Jo. In September 1989, the company became a wholly owned subsidiary of the Denver firm Discovery Capital Corp. Lasorda continued to own 10% of the restructured entity. The parent company through which Lasorda maintained his stake, Lasorda Foods Holding Corp Inc., was initially based in Fountain Valley, California, before moving to Irvine and then Paramount. A Boca Raton, Florida-based company, Modami Services, acquired Lasorda Foods Holding Corp Inc. in August 1993. Lasorda and Lasorda Foods President Steven Fox, who together owned a majority of Lasorda Foods stock, were paid in Modami shares.

Lasorda developed a reputation for conflicting with opposing teams' mascots. On August 28, 1988, at a game against the Philadelphia Phillies at Veterans Stadium, the Phillies' mascot, the Phillie Phanatic, carried a dummy resembling Lasorda. Lasorda chased the Phanatic around the field, pushed him to the ground, then hit him with the dummy. Approximately one year later, on August 23, 1989, at a game against the Montreal Expos at Olympic Stadium, Lasorda yelled at the Expos' mascot, Youppi!, for performing stunts and pretending to sleep on top of the Dodgers' dugout. Third base umpire Bob Davidson ejected Youppi! from the game, marking the first time in MLB history that a mascot was ejected from a game. In an interview, Lasorda admitted to confronting the San Diego Chicken, the unofficial mascot of the San Diego Padres, and threatened to strangle him if he did not stop his in-game stunts.

In June 2005, President George W. Bush asked Lasorda to serve as a delegate to the U.S. National Day at the World Exposition in Aichi, Japan. In 2008, the government of Japan conferred upon Lasorda the Order of the Rising Sun, Gold Rays with Rosette, which represents the fourth-highest of eight classes associated with the award. The decoration was presented in acknowledgment of his contributions to Japanese baseball.

Prior to his death, Lasorda was the oldest living Hall of Famer, attaining that distinction after the death of Red Schoendienst on June 6, 2018.

== Personal life and death ==
Lasorda was born and raised with four brothers. His father Sabatino was an Italian immigrant from the Tollo region of Abruzzo in Italy. His mother was Carmella (Cavuto) Lasorda. He was the second of five sons. A practicing Roman Catholic, he and his wife Jo, a Baptist, were married in 1950. Lasorda had a priest come to Dodgers games on Sundays to offer Mass for Catholic players. The couple met in Jo's hometown of Greenville, South Carolina while Lasorda was playing there for the Greenville Spinners. They resided in Fullerton, California, for more than 50 years and had two children. A gymnasium and youth center in Yorba Linda, California were named in memory of their son Tom Jr. on September 7, 1997. In 1991, Tom Jr. (known as "Spunky") died of complications related to AIDS. Lasorda denied that his son was gay; according to sportswriter Bill Plaschke, he insisted his son died of cancer.

Lasorda was the godfather to Thomas Piazza, the younger brother of Major League Hall of Fame catcher Mike Piazza, both of whom are also from Lasorda's hometown of Norristown, Pennsylvania. Thomas was named after Lasorda and it has been widely misstated by Steve Staats that Lasorda is Mike's godfather. Lasorda was also the godfather to former Major League catcher, Alex Avila. Alex's grandfather, Ralph Avila, is a former scout with the Dodgers and friend to Lasorda of over 50 years. Alex's middle name of Thomas was given for Lasorda. Lasorda was also the godfather of Kyle Karros, Eric Karros' son, who currently plays third base for the Colorado Rockies.

On June 3, 2012, at age 84, Lasorda was hospitalized in New York City after suffering a heart attack which was not considered very serious. On November 8, 2020, Lasorda was hospitalized for heart problems and reported to be "in serious condition" in intensive care. The Dodgers did not make the announcement about his hospitalization public until a week later. On December 1, 2020, Lasorda was moved out of intensive care as his condition improved. After being released from the hospital, he went into sudden cardiac arrest at his home two days later on January 7, 2021. He was rushed back to the hospital, where he died that night at the age of 93. Numerous buildings in Los Angeles were illuminated in blue in tribute to Lasorda, including City Hall, Staples Center, and Banc of California Stadium; at Dodger Stadium, flags were flown at half-staff. He was buried at Rose Hills Memorial Park alongside his son, Tom Jr.

On September 21, 2021, the Dodgers announced on Twitter the death of Lasorda's widow, Jo, at age 91.

In March 2023, a stretch of the Interstate 5 was named in his honor as "Tommy Lasorda Dodger Legend Memorial Highway," located in his former residence of Fullerton between Lincoln Avenue and Ball Road.

== See also ==
- Tommy Lasorda Baseball
- List of Major League Baseball managers with most career ejections
- List of Major League Baseball managers with most career wins
