= IAU (disambiguation) =

IAU or Iau may refer to:

== Organizations ==
=== Universities ===
- International American University
- International Association of Universities
- Islamic American University
- Islamic Azad University
- Interamerican University of Puerto Rico

=== Others ===
- International Astronomical Union
- International Association of Ultrarunners (IAU) is the governing body for ultra running
- Italian Actors Union, former name of the Guild of Italian American Actors, United States
- International Crossbow Shooting Union or International Armbrustschützen Union (IAU)

== Other uses ==
- Immersion gold plating (IAu), a surface finish process in PCB manufacturing
- 5000 IAU, an asteroid
- Is Anyone Up?, defunct pornographic website
- The Iau language
- An occasional spelling for Eiao, an uninhabited island in French Polynesia
- Robert Iau (1935–2005), Singaporean civil servant
