= Narva College of the University of Tartu =

Tartu University's institute in Narva, Estonia

Coordinates: 59°22′29.76″N 28°10′59.53″E

- Tartu Ülikooli Narva Kolledž
- Established: 1999
- Director: Kristina Kallas
- Location: Narva, Estonia
- Website: http://narva.ut.ee/

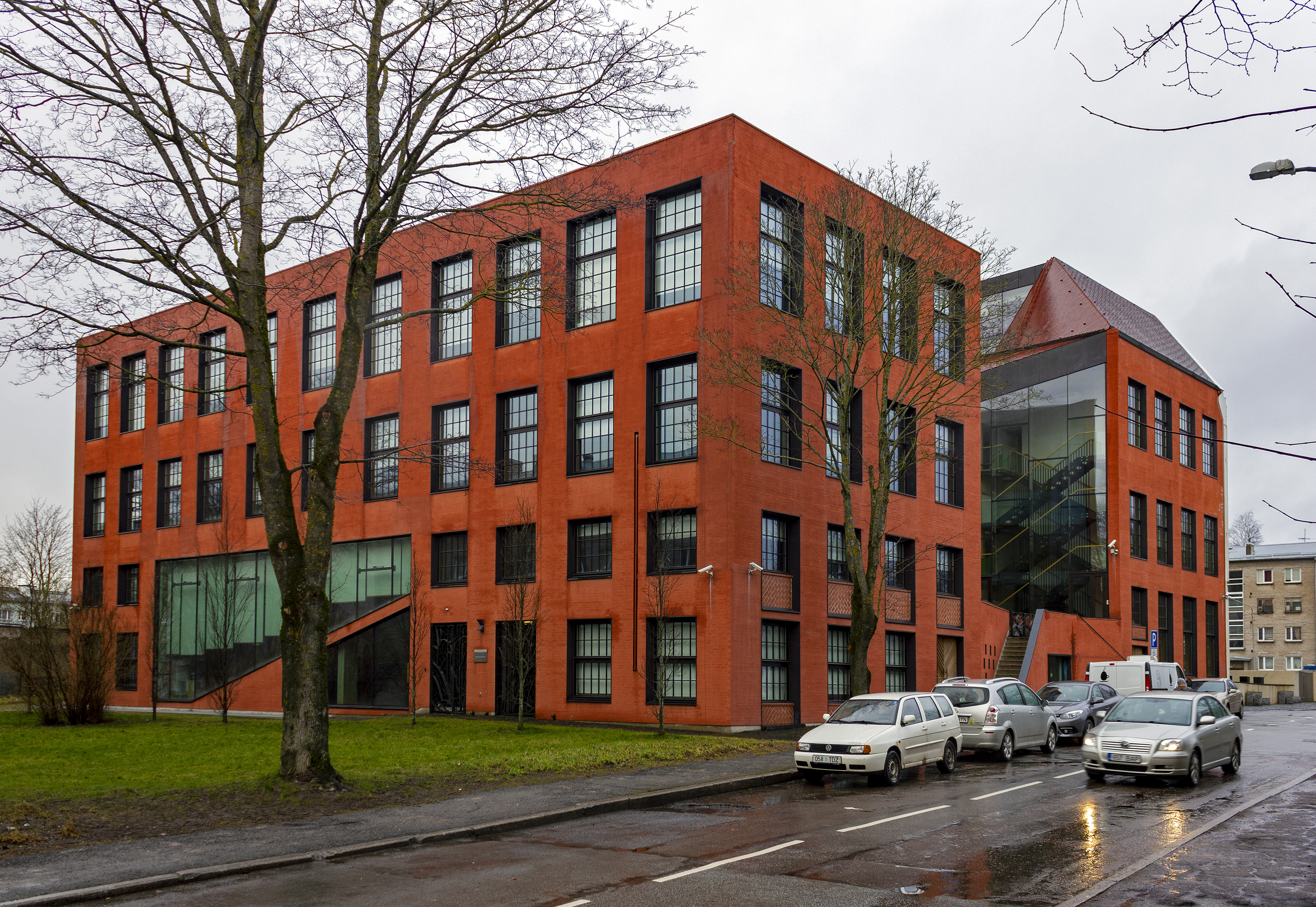
Narva College of the University of Tartu

Narva College of the University of Tartu (Estonian: Tartu Ülikooli Narva Kolledž, Russian: На́рвский ко́лледж Тартуского университета) is a college of the University of Tartu. It was founded in 1999 in the city of Narva, Estonia.

== Organisation ==
The head of the College is a director, who is appointed by the Council of the University of Tartu. The College comprises five divisions: Division of Civic Studies, Division of Psychology and Pedagogy, Division of Estonian Language and Literature, Division of Russian Language and Literature, and Division of Foreign Languages.
