= Jarno Laur =

Estonian politician (born 1975)

Jarno Laur (born 13 September 1975 in Tartu) is an Estonian politician. He was a member of X Riigikogu representing the Social Democratic Party. From 2009 until 2013, he was the Mayor of Väätsa Parish, from 2013 until 2017, he was the Deputy Mayor of Tartu, and from 2017, Mayor of Tartu Parish.

Laur graduated from secondary school at the Tartu Mart Reiniku School in 1993. In 2008, he graduated from University of Tartu, Narva College with a degree in local government administration and received his master's degree from the Tallinn University of Technology.
