= Laurer =

Laurer is a surname. Notable people with the surname include:

- George Laurer (1925–2019), American engineer
- Johann Friedrich Laurer (1798–1853), German anatomist, pharmacologist, and lichenologist
- Scott J. Laurer (born 1965), American judge
- Walter Laurer, Austrian para-alpine skier
