= Laurey =

Laurey is a French surname

- Joy Laurey, French writer
- Thierry Laurey, French professional football manager and former player
- Nuihau Laurey, French politician and former vice-president of French Polynesia

== See also ==
- Laureys (disambiguation)
- Laurie (disambiguation)
