= Laurus (disambiguation) =

Laurus is a genus of evergreen trees belonging to the laurel family, Lauraceae.

Laurus may also refer to:

- Laurus Labs, Indian multinational pharmaceutical and biotechnology company
- Laurus (novel), a 2012 Russian novel by Eugene Vodolazkin
- Laurus Škurla (1928–2008), First Hierarch of the Russian Orthodox Church Outside Russia
- Saint Laurus, a second-century legendary Christian martyr

== See also ==
- Laurel (disambiguation)
- Laur (surname)
