= Lau, Estonia =

Village in Estonia

Coordinates: 58°59′25″N 24°58′28″E

Lau
- Village
- Interactive map of Lau
- Country: Estonia
- County: Rapla County
- Parish: Kehtna Parish
- Time zone: UTC+2 (EET)
  - Summer (DST): UTC+3 (EEST)

Lau is a village in Kehtna Parish, Rapla County in northern-central Estonia.

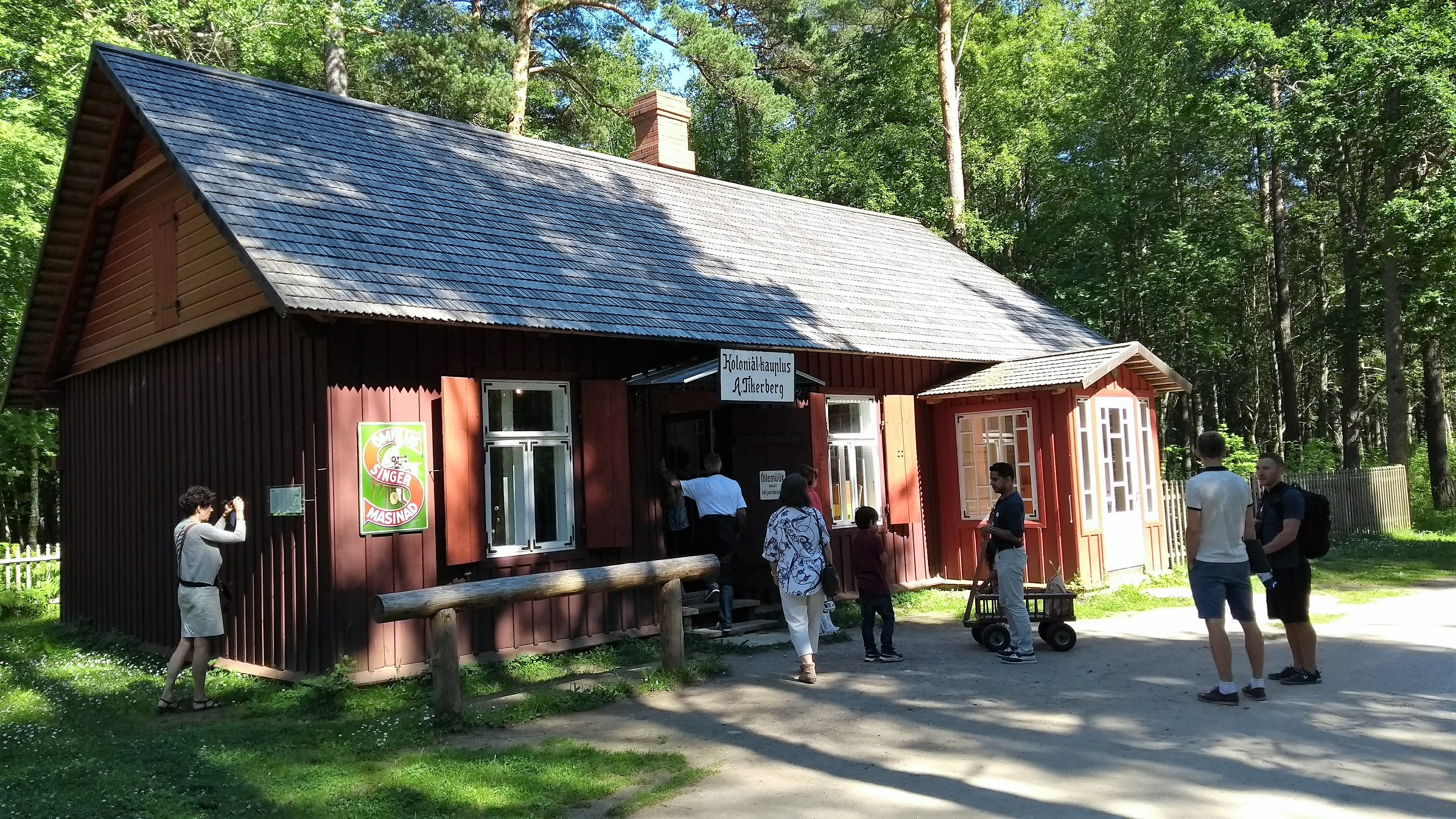
Lau village shop relocated to the Estonian Open Air Museum.
