= Bob deLauer =

American football player (1920–2002)

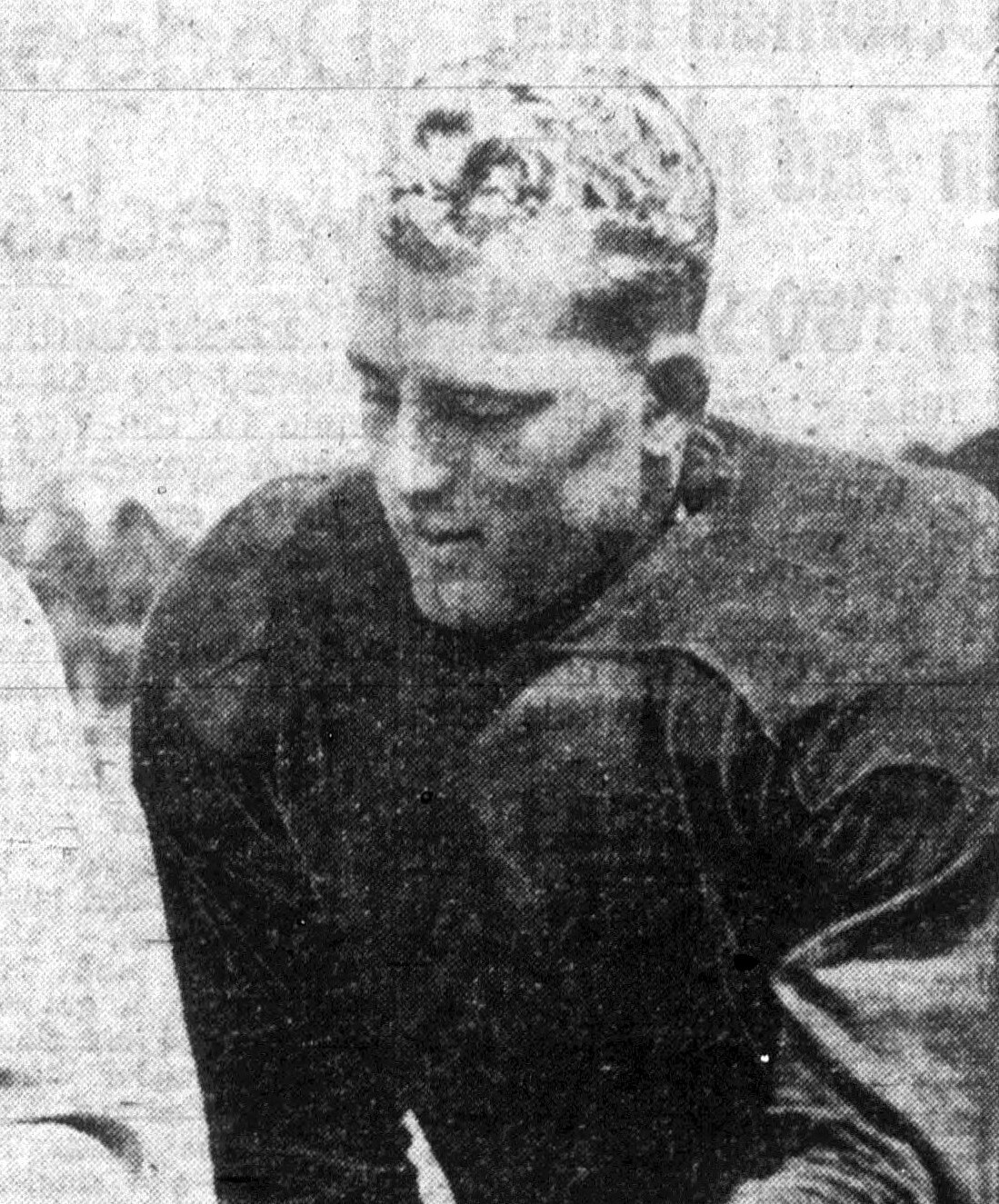
- deLauer, circa 1941

No. 65, 55
- Position: Center

Personal information
- Born: August 30, 1920; San Francisco, California, U.S.
- Died: November 27, 2002 (aged 82); Los Angeles, California, U.S.
- Listed height: 6 ft 1 in (1.85 m)
- Listed weight: 218 lb (99 kg)

Career information
- High school: San Diego (CA) Hoover
- College: USC (1938–1941)
- NFL draft: 1942: 10th round, 82nd overall pick

Career history
- Cleveland/Los Angeles Rams (1945–1946)

Awards and highlights
- NFL champion (1945)

Career NFL statistics
- Games played: 13
- Games started: 6
- Stats at Pro Football Reference

Robert deLauer (August 30, 1920 – November 27, 2002) was an American professional football center who played two seasons with the Cleveland/Los Angeles Rams of the National Football League (NFL). He played college football at the University of Southern California and attended Herbert Hoover High School in San Diego, California.

== Professional career ==
deLauer was selected by the Cleveland Rams of the NFL with the 82nd overall pick in the 1942 NFL draft. He played in thirteen games, starting six, for the Cleveland/Los Angeles Rams from 1945 to 1946.

== Personal life ==
deLauer also appeared in the films Saturday's Hero, Peggy and Father Was a Fullback in the uncredited role of a football player.
