= Jarno Tenkula =

Finnish footballer (born 1982)

Personal information
- Date of birth: 16 June 1982 (age 44)
- Place of birth: Oulu, Finland
- Height: 1.84 m (6 ft 1/2 in)
- Positions: Forward; left winger

Team information
- Current team: RoPS
- Number: 7

Senior career*
| Years | Team | Apps | (Gls) |
- OLS
| 2004–2005 | TP-47 | 42 | (3) |
| 2006 | VPS | 17 | (1) |
| 2007–2008 | AC Oulu | 34 | (5) |
| 2009– | RoPS | 22 | (0) |
- * Club domestic league appearances and goals as of 28 September 2010

Jarno Tenkula (born 16 June 1982) is a Finnish football player currently playing for RoPS; he formerly played for OLS, TP-47, VPS and
AC Oulu.
