= Lauren =

- Pronunciation: /ˈlɔːrən/ LOR-ən, /ˈlɒrən/ LORR-ən
- Gender: Unisex (mostly female)
- Language: English; French

Origin
- Meaning: Sweet of Honor
- Region of origin: England; France

Other names
- Variant forms: Laura; Lara; Laurence; Laurent
- Related names: Laura; Lauryn

Lauren is mostly a feminine given name. The name's meaning may be "laurel tree", "sweet of honor", or "wisdom". It is derived from the French name Laurence, a feminine version of Laurent, which is in turn derived from the Roman surname Laurentius.

Although originally a male name, the name's popularity with females has been widely attributed to actress Lauren Bacall. It is a popular name in the United Kingdom, the United States, and Australia. In the U.S. the name ranked #170 in 2018 and #148 in 2017. The name was most popular in the U.S. in the 1980s and 1990s.

== Given name ==
- Lauren (Cameroonian footballer) (Laureano Bisan-Etame Mayer; born 1977), Cameroonian men's footballer
- Lauren (Brazilian footballer) (Lauren Eduarda Leal Costa; born 2002), Brazilian women's footballer
- Lauren Ackerman (1905–1993), American physician and pathologist
- Lauren Adams (actress) (born 1982), American actress
- Lauren Adamson (1948–2021), American developmental psychologist
- Lauren Agenbag (born 1996), South African cricket umpire
- Lauren Ahrens (born 1991), Australian rules footballer
- Lauren Alaina (born 1994), American singer and former American Idol 10 contestant
- Lauren Albanese (born 1989), American professional tennis player
- Lauren Alloy (born 1963), American professor
- Lauren Ambrose (born 1978), American actress and singer
- Lauren Anderson (dancer) (born 1965), American ballet dancer
- Lauren Anderson (model) (born 1980), American model and Playboy Playmate
- Lauren Andino (born 1986), American artist, musician and skateboarder
- Lauren Marie-Elizabeth "Lulu" Antariksa (born 1995), American actress and singer
- Lauren Aquilina (born 1995), British singer
- Lauren Arikan (born 1984, American politician
- Lauren Arnell (born 1987), Australian rules footballer
- Lauren Arnouts (born 1994), Dutch professional racing cyclist
- Lauren Arthur, American politician
- Lauren Ash (born 1983), Canadian actress and comedian
- Lauren Aston, English businesswoman and designer
- Lauren Y. Atlas (fl. 2000s), American neuropsychologist
- Lauren Auder (born 1999), British-French singer and record producer
- Lauren Bacall (1924–2014), American actress born Betty Joan Perske
- Lauren Baillie (born 1982), Scottish lawn bowler
- Lauren Anne Baldwin, British actress
- Lauren Brooke Baldwin (born 1979), American journalist
- Lauren Barlow (born 1985), member of Christian rock band Barlow Girl
- Lauren Barnes (born 1989), American professional soccer defender
- Lauren Barnette (born 1985), Miss Virginia 2007
- Lauren Barnholdt, American author
- Lauren Barwick (born 1977), Canadian equestrian
- Lauren Bay Regula (born 1981), Canadian softball pitcher
- Lauren Beard (born 1984), British children's book illustrator
- Lauren Beers (born 1994), American artistic gymnast
- Lauren Belfer, American writer
- Lauren Bench (born 1997), American ice hockey player
- Lauren Bennett (born 1989), British singer, dancer and model
- Lauren Benton (activist) (born 1988), British philanthropist
- Lauren Benton (historian) (born 1956), American historian
- Lauren Bercovitch (born 1984), Canadian producer
- Lauren Berlant (1957–2021), American academic
- Lauren Bernard (born 2001), American ice hockey player
- Lauren Bertolacci (born 1985), Australian volleyball player
- Lauren Betts (born 2003), Spanish-born British-American basketball player
- Lauren Beukes (born 1976), South African novelist
- Lauren Billys (born 1988), Puerto Rican Olympic eventing rider
- Lauren Bittner (born 1980), American actress
- Lauren Boebert (born 1986), American politician, businesswoman, congresswoman
- Lauren Bon (born 1962), American artist
- Lauren Book (born 1984), American politician
- Lauren Booth (born 1967), British journalist and activist
- Lauren Ogilvie "Lo" Bosworth (born 1986), American appearing in the reality TV shows Laguna Beach and The Hills
- Lauren Bowker (born 1985), British designer
- Lauren Bowles (born 1970), American actress
- Lauren Boyle (born 1987), New Zealand swimmer
- Lauren Brant (born 1989), Australian entertainer
- Lauren Braun Costello (born 1976), American chef
- Lauren Briggs (born 1979), British squash player
- Lauren Brooke, British author
- Lauren Bruton (born 1992), English footballer
- Lauren Burgess (born 1986), New Zealand rugby player
- Lauren Burns (born 1974), Australian martial artist
- Lauren Bush (born 1984), American model
- Lauren Cahoon (born 1985), American taekwondo practitioner
- Lauren Campbell (born 1981), Canadian triathlete
- Lauren Carlini (born 1995), American volleyball player
- Lauren Ashley Carter, American actress and producer
- Lauren Chamberlain (born 1993), American softball player
- Lauren Chapin (1945–2026), American actress
- Lauren Cheatle (born 1998), Australian cricket player
- Lauren Chief Elk (born 1987), Native American feminist educator
- Lauren Child (born 1965), British author and illustrator
- Lauren M. Childs, American mathematician, expert on modeling disease spread
- Lauren Cholewinski (born 1988), American speed skater
- Lauren Christy (born 1967), English-born singer and songwriter
- Lauren Cohan (born 1982), American actress best known for her role on The Walking Dead
- Lauren Cohn, American radio host
- Lauren Collins (born 1986), Canadian actress best known for her role on Degrassi: The Next Generation
- Lauren Colthorpe (born 1985), Australian association football player
- Lauren Conrad (born 1986), American reality television star known for her role on The Hills
- Lauren Cornell, American curator
- Lauren Corrao, American television executive
- Lauren Cox (born 1998), American professional basketball player
- Lauren Crace (born 1986), British actress
- Lauren Crandall (born 1985), American field hockey player
- Lauren Creamer (born 1992), Irish cyclist
- Lauren Cuthbertson (born 1984), British ballerina
- Lauren Daigle (born 1991), American singer
- Lauren Davies, British novelist
- Lauren Davis (born 1993), American professional tennis player
- Lauren B. Davis (born 1955), Canadian writer
- Lauren De Crescenzo (born 1990), American cyclist
- Lauren DeStefano (born 1984), American author
- Lauren Diewold (born 1990), Canadian actress
- Lauren Donner (born 1949), American producer
- Lauren Doyle (born 1991), American rugby sevens player
- Lauren Drain (born 1985), American nurse
- Lauren Drummond (born 1987), British actress
- Lauren Duca (born 1991), American freelance writer and reporter
- Lauren Dukoff (born 1984), American photographer
- Lauren Ebsary (born 1983), Australian women's cricketer
- Lauren Egea (born 1996), Spanish professional footballer
- Lauren Elaine (born 1983), American fashion designer, actress and model
- Lauren Elder (born 1946), American artist and designer
- Lauren Elder (born 1990) (born 1990), American artist
- Lauren Elliott (born 1946), American video game designer
- Lauren Ellis (born 1989), New Zealand track cyclist
- Lauren Embree (born 1991), American tennis player
- Lauren English (born 1989), American swimmer
- Lauren Ervin (born 1985), American women's basketball player
- Lauren Evans (born 1983), American singer and songwriter
- Lauren Ezersky (born 1955), American television presenter
- Lauren Fagan, Australian operatic soprano
- Lauren Faust (born 1974), Emmy-nominated American animator and creator of My Little Pony: Friendship Is Magic
- Lauren Fendrick (born 1982), American professional beach volleyball player
- Lauren Fensterstock (born 1975), American artist, writer, curator, critic
- Lauren Filer (born 2000), English cricketer
- Lauren Fisher (born 1982), American former tennis player
- Lauren Fix, American journalist
- Lauren Flaherty, American business woman and chief marketing officer
- Lauren Flanigan (born 1959), American singer
- Lauren Flax, American DJ, songwriter and producer
- Lauren Fleshman (born 1981), American track and field athlete
- Lauren Fowlkes (born 1988), American soccer player
- Lauren Froderman (born 1991), American dancer
- Lauren Frost (born 1985), heroine in the series "Bloom"
- Lauren Gale (1917–1996), American basketball player
- Lauren Gale (sprinter) (born 2000), Canadian athlete
- Lauren Galley (born 1995), American author
- Lauren Gardner (born 1985), American sportscaster
- Lauren Geremia (born 1982), American interior designer
- Lauren German (born 1978), American actress
- Lauren Gibbemeyer (born 1988), American indoor volleyball player
- Lauren Gibbs (born 1984), American bobsledder
- Lauren Gibson (born 1991), American softball player
- Lauren Giraldo (born 1998), American singer, actress, producer and advocate
- Lauren Glassberg (born 1971), American journalist
- Lauren Glazier (born 1985), Canadian actress
- Lauren Gold (born 1981), English fashion model and actress
- Lauren Goodger (born 1986), English TV personality and model
- Lauren Goodnight (born 1980), American voice actress
- Lauren Gottlieb (born 1988), Indian actress and dancer
- Lauren Graham (born 1967), American actress
- Lauren Grandcolas (1963–2001), American terrorism victim
- Lauren Gray (born 1991), Scottish curler
- Lauren Green (born 1958), American musician
- Lauren Greenfield (born 1966), American artist and documentary photographer
- Lauren Gregg (born 1960), American soccer coach
- Lauren Greutman (born 1981), American author
- Lauren Griffiths (born 1987), English cricketer
- Lauren Grodstein (born 1975), American novelist
- Lauren Groff (born 1978), American novelist
- Lauren Gunderson (born 1982), American playwright
- Lauren Gussis, American television writer
- Lauren Haeger (born 1992), American professional softball pitcher
- Lauren Hall (born 1979), American cyclist
- Lauren Hogg (born 2003), American gun control advocate
- Lauren Kelsey Hall (born 1984), beauty queen
- Lauren Halliwell (born 1989), British ice hockey player
- Lauren Hammersley (born 1981), Canadian actress
- Lauren Haney (born 1936), American novelist
- Lauren Harries (born 1978), child actress
- Lauren Harris (born 1984), British singer
- Lauren Hart (born 1967), American pop singer
- Lauren Hart (born 1986), American heavy metal musician
- Lauren Hemp (born 2000), English professional female footballer
- Lauren Henderson (born 1966), English novelist
- Lauren Zoe "Laurie" Hernandez (born 2000), American artistic gymnast
- Lauren Herring (born 1993), US tennis player
- Lauren Hewett (born 1981), Australian actress
- Lauren Hewitt (born 1978), Australian track and field
- Lauren Hildebrandt (born 1982), American musician
- Lauren Hill (basketball) (born 1995), American basketball player
- Lauren Michelle Hill (born 1979), American model and actress
- Lauren Hobart (born 1969/1970), American businesswoman
- Lauren Hoffman (born 1977), American singer
- Lauren Hogg (born 2003), American activist and author
- Lauren Holiday (born 1987), American soccer player
- Lauren Holly (born 1963), American actress
- Lauren Holmes, American author
- Lauren Holt (born 1991), American actress
- Lauren Holtkamp (born 1980), American professional referee
- Lauren Howe (golfer) (born 1959), American professional golfer
- Lauren Howe (model) (born 1993), Canadian actress and model / Miss Universe 2017
- Lauren Hunkin (born 1979), Canadian show jumper
- Lauren Hutton (born 1943), American former model
- Lauren Iungerich (born 1974), American writer
- Lauren J. Fuchs, American field hockey player
- Lauren Jackson (born 1981), Australian basketball player
- Lauren Jansen (born 1992), Australian basketball player
- Lauren Jauregui (born 1996), American singer
- Lauren Jelencovich (born 1980s), American soprano singer, Yanni vocalist
- Lauren Jenkins (born 1991), American singer-songwriter, actress and director
- Lauren Jeska (born 1974), British transgender athlete convicted of attempted murder
- Lauren Johnson (born 1987), American middle-distance runner
- Lauren Jones (born 1982), American actress
- Lauren K. Alleyne (born 1979), Trinidadian-American immigrant poet and author
- Lauren Kalman (born 1980), American visual artist
- Lauren Kate (born 1981), American writer
- Lauren Kennedy (born 1973), American actress
- Lauren Kern, American magazine editor
- Lauren Kessler, American writer
- Lauren Kieffer (born 1987), American equestrian
- Lauren Kim Roche (born 1961), New Zealand writer
- Lauren Kitchen (born 1990), Australian cyclist
- Lauren Kleppin (born 1988), American long-distance runner
- Lauren Kolodny (fl. 2010s–2020s), American entrepreneur and venture capitalist
- Lauren Komanski (born 1985), American bicycle racer
- Lauren Koslow (born 1953), American actress
- Lauren Lake (born 1969), American lawyer and broadcaster
- Lauren Landa (born 1988), American voice actress
- Lauren Lane (born 1961), American actress
- Lauren Lanning (born 1983), Miss Texas 2006
- Lauren Lapkus (born 1985), American actress
- Lauren Lappin (born 1984), American softball player
- Lauren Laverne (born 1978), British disc jockey
- Lauren Lazin, American film and television director
- Lauren Lazo (born 1993), American association football player
- Lauren Lenentine (born 2000), Canadian curler
- Lauren Liebenberg (born 1972), South African writer
- Lauren LoGiudice (born 1983), American actress
- Lauren London (born 1984), American actress known for her role in ATL
- Lauren Lucas, American musician
- Lauren Lueders (born 1987), American basketball player
- Lauren Luke (born 1981), English makeup artist and Internet Mogul
- Lauren Lyle (born 1993), Scottish actress
- Lauren D. Lyman (1891–1972), American journalist
- Lauren Lyster (born 1981), American finance journalist
- Lauren MacColl, Scottish fiddle player
- Lauren McCrostie (born 1996), British actress
- Lauren McFall (born 1980), American swimmer
- Lauren McKnight (born 1988), American actress
- Lauren McQueen (born 1996), English actress
- Lauren MacMullan (born 1964), American animation director best known for her work on King of the Hill
- Lauren Maltby (born 1984), American actress
- Lauren Mann (born 1984), Canadian curler
- Lauren Manning (born 1961), American author
- Lauren Mansfield (born 1989), Australian basketball player
- Lauren Marcus (born 1985), American actress
- Lauren Matsumoto (born 1987), American politician
- Lauren Mayberry (born 1987), British singer
- Lauren Mayhew (born 1985), American singer and actress
- Lauren McNally, American politician
- Lauren Meece (born 1983), American judoka
- Lauren Mellor (born 1985), South African fashion model
- Lauren Messier (born 2003), Canadian ice hockey player
- Lauren Elizabeth "Laurie" Metcalf (born 1955), American actress
- Lauren Miller Rogen (born 1982), American actress
- Lauren Milliet (born 1996), American soccer midfielder
- Lauren Mitchell (born 1991), Australian gymnast
- Lauren Molina (born 1981), American actress
- Lauren Mollica (born 1980), American skateboarder
- Lauren Montgomery (born 1980), American artist
- Lauren Morelli (born 1982), American writer
- Lauren Moss (born 1987), Australian politician
- Lauren Mote (born 1997), English actress
- Lauren Mukheibir (born 2001), South African rock climber
- Lauren Murdoch, Australian head chef
- Lauren Murphy (born 1983), American mixed martial artist
- Lauren "Mykie" Mychal (born 1989), American YouTuber and make-up artist
- Lauren Myracle (born 1969), American author
- Lauren Nelson (born 1986), Miss American 2007
- Lauren Newton (born 1952), American singer
- Lauren Nicholson (basketball) (born 1993), Australian professional basketball player
- Lauren Nourse (born 1982), Australian netball player
- Lauren O'Connell (born 1988), American singer/songwriter
- Lauren O'Farrell (born 1977), British writer and artist
- Lauren O'Neil, British actress
- Lauren O'Reilly (volleyball) (born 1989), Canadian volleyball player
- Lauren O'Reilly (rugby union) New Zealand rugby union player
- Lauren O'Rourke (born 1988), English actress
- Lauren Oliver (born 1982), American author
- Lauren Ornelas, American activist
- Lauren Keyana Keke Palmer (born 1993), American actress
- Lauren Paolini (born 1987), American volleyball player
- Lauren Parker (born 1991), English professional boxer
- Lauren Patel (born 2001), English actress
- Lauren Patten (born 1992), American actress
- Lauren Perdue (born 1991), American swimmer, Olympic gold medalist
- Lauren Perkins (born 1988), American skateboarder
- Lauren Phillips (Welsh actress) (born 1981), British actress, television presenter
- Lauren Platt (born 1997), British singer
- Lauren Plawecki (born 1994), American politician
- Lauren Poe, mayor of Gainesville, Florida
- Lauren Poetschka (born 1974), Australian hurdler
- Lauren Pope (born 1982), English actress
- Lauren Potter (born 1990), American actress
- Lauren Powers (born 1961), American actress and bodybuilder
- Lauren Powley (born 1984), American field hockey player
- Lauren Price (born 1994), British boxing
- Lauren Pritchard (actress) (born 1977), American actress
- Lauren "Lolo" Pritchard (born 1987), American actress and singer
- Lauren Quigley (born 1995), British swimmer
- Lauren Raine, American artist
- Lauren Redniss (born 1974), American artist and writer
- Lauren Rembi (born 1992), French fencer
- Lauren Resnick, American psychologist
- Lauren Reynolds (born 1991), Australian cyclist
- Lauren Ridloff (born 1978), American actress
- Lauren Rikleen, American attorney, author and expert speaker
- Lauren Rowles (born 1998), British parasport rower
- Lauren Royal, American author
- Lauren S. McCready (1915–2007), founder of the US Merchant Marine Academy
- Lauren Samuels (born 1988), British actress and singer
- Lauren Sánchez (born 1969), American news anchor
- Lauren Sanderson (born 1996), American singer and songwriter
- Lauren Santo Domingo (born 1976), American magazine editor
- Lauren Savoy (born 1963), American musician
- Lauren Scala (born 1982), American television reporter
- Lauren Schacher (born 1985), American screenwriter
- Lauren Scherf (born 1988), Australian basketball player
- Lauren Schmetterling (born 1988), American rower
- Lauren Schmidt Hissrich (born 1978), American television producer
- Lauren Scott (born 1963), American LGBT activist
- Lauren Scruggs (born 1988), American fashion journalist, blogger and model
- Lauren Selby (born 1984), British squash player
- Lauren Selig, American film producer
- Lauren Senft (born 1987), Canadian figure skater
- Lauren Sesselmann (born 1983), American-born Canadian defender, former forward
- Lauren Shakely (born 1948), American poet
- Julia Lauren Shehadi (born 1983), American sportscaster
- Lauren Shera (born 1988), American musician
- Lauren Sherman, American journalist
- Lauren Siddall (born 1984), British squash player
- Lauren Silva (born 1987), American painter
- Lauren Silver (born 1993), American footballer
- Lauren Silver (water polo) (born 1987), American water polo player
- Lauren Sisler (born 1984), American sports journalist
- Lauren Simmons (born 1994), African American stock trader
- Lauren Slater (born 1963), American writer and psychologist
- Lauren Smith (badminton) (born 1991), British badminton player
- Lauren Lee Smith (born 1980), Canadian actress
- Lauren Socha (born 1990), British actress
- Lauren Southern (born 1995), Canadian political activist
- Lauren Spalding (born 1980), American sprint canoer
- Lauren Spierer (born 1991), American college student
- Lauren Stamile (born 1976), American actress
- Lauren States (born 1956), former Chief of Technology
- Lauren Steadman (born 1992), British Paralympian
- Lauren Stephens (born 1986), American racing cyclist
- Lauren Storm (born 1987), American actress and model
- Lauren Strawn (born 1992), American singer-songwriter
- Lauren Sullivan, British politician
- Lauren Tamayo (born 1983), American professional racing cyclist
- Lauren Tarshis (born 1963), author of the I Survived series and Emma-Jean Lazarus
- Lauren Taylor (actress) (born 1998), American actress
- Lauren Taylor (golfer) (born 1994), English professional golfer
- Lauren Taylor (journalist) (born 1970), British journalist
- Lauren-Marie Taylor (born 1961), American actress
- Lauren Terrazzano (1968–2007), American journalist
- Cynthia Lauren Tewes (born 1954), American actress best known for her role in TV's The Love Boat
- Lauren Thomas-Johnson (born 1988), British professional basketball player
- Lauren Thompson (born 1982), American television journalist
- Lauren Tom (born 1961), American actress best known for her role in The Joy Luck Club
- Lauren Townsend (footballer) (born 1990), Welsh football defender
- Lauren Toyota, Canadian actress
- Lauren Turner (singer) (born 1986), American singer
- Lauren Underwood (born 1986), American politician
- Lauren Caitlin Upton (born 1989), Miss Teen USA 2007
- Lauren V. Wood, American allergist
- Lauren van Oosten (born 1978), Canadian competitive swimmer, Olympic athlete, Pan American Games gold medallist
- Lauren Vaughan, American politician from Washington, D.C.
- Lauren Vélez (born 1964), Puerto Rican actress
- Lauren Verster (born 1980), Dutch programme maker and television presenter
- Lauren Von Der Pool (born 1984), American celebrity chef, cookbook author and caterer
- Lauren Walker (born 1989), British football player
- Lauren Walsh (actress), American actress
- Lauren Walsh (golfer) (born 2000), Irish professional golfer
- Lauren Ward (born 1970), American actress
- Lauren Weedman (born 1969), American actress
- Lauren Weeks, American Hyrox athlete
- Lauren Weinstein (comics) (born 1975), American comic book artist
- Lauren Weinstein (technologist), American activist concerned with matters involving technology
- Lauren Weisberger (born 1977), American novelist
- Lauren Wells (athlete) (born 1988), Australian athletics competitor
- Lauren Wells (footballer) (born 1988), Welsh football goalkeeper
- Lauren Wenger (born 1984), American water polo player
- Lauren Whittington, American journalist
- Lauren Wildbolz (born 1981), Swiss cook, cooking expert and writer
- Lauren Wilkinson (ice hockey) (born 1989), British ice hockey player
- Lauren Wilkinson (rower) (born 1989), Canadian rower
- Lauren Willig (born 1977), American author
- Lauren Williams (footballer) (born 1994), American-Saint Kitts and Nevis footballer
- Lauren Williams (ice hockey) (born 1996), Canadian ice hockey player
- Lauren Williams (journalist), American journalist and former editor-in-chief of Vox
- Lauren Williams (mathematician) (born 1978), American mathematician
- Lauren Williams (professional wrestling) (born 1981), Canadian professional wrestler
- Lauren Williams (taekwondo) (born 1999), Welsh taekwondo athlete
- Lauren Wilson (born 1987), Canadian figure skater
- Lauren Winfield (born 1990), English cricket player
- Lauren Winner (born 1976), American writer
- Lauren Wise, Canadian-American epidemiologist
- Lauren Wolkstein (born 1982), American film director
- Lauren Wood, American singer
- Lauren Woodland (born 1977), American actress
- Lauren Woods (born 1979), American artist
- Lauren Woolstencroft (born 1981), Canadian paralympic skier
- Lauren Worsham (born 1982), American singer actress
- Lauren Yee (playwright), American playwright
- Lauren Young (born 1993), Filipino-American actress
- Lauren Zakrin, American actress

== Fictional characters ==
- Lauren Ackerman in iCarly
- Lauren Adams (character) in CHERUB
- Lauren Andrews in Waterloo Road
- Lauren Fenmore Baldwin in The Young and the Restless
- Lauren Branning in EastEnders
- Lauren Cooper in The Catherine Tate Show
- Lauren Harris in Fat Friends
- Lauren Hutchinson in Square Pegs
- Lauren Lewis in the Canadian television series Lost Girl
- Lauren Mallory in Twilight
- Lauren Miller, a character played by Courteney Cox in the American sitcom television series Family Ties
- Lauren Oya Olamina in Parable of the Sower
- Lauren Reed in the television show Alias
- Lauren "Lo" Ridgemount in the Canadian animated series Stoked
- Lauren Shiba in Power Rangers Samurai
- Lauren Strucker in the television show The Gifted
- Lauren Turner in Neighbours
- Lauren Valentine in Hollyoaks
- Lauren Zizes in Glee
- Lauren, protagonist of Slender: The Arrival

== See also ==
- Lauren-Ashley Redmond (born 1991), American country singer
- Laura (given name)
- Lauran, a given name
- Laure (disambiguation)
- Laureen
- Laurene
- Jillian Lauren, American writer
- Laurens (given name)
- Laurent (name), a given name
- Laurin, a surname and given name
- Lauron (disambiguation)
- Lauryn, a given name
- Loren, a given name
