= Lauren (disambiguation) =

Lauren is a feminine given name and a surname. It may also refer to:

- Lauren (perfume), a Ralph Lauren fragrance
- Lauren (EP) by Keke Palmer, 2016
- "Lauren", a song by Holly Humberstone on Paint My Bedroom Black, 2023
- Lauren Engineers & Constructors
- Penn, North Dakota, also known as Lauren, an unincorporated community
- Lauren (Cameroonian footballer) (born 1977), Cameroonian men's footballer
- Lauren (Brazilian footballer) (born 2002), Brazilian women's footballer
- "Lauren" (Criminal Minds), a 2011 television episode

== See also ==
- Laure (disambiguation)
- Laureen
- Laurene (disambiguation)
- Laurens (disambiguation)
- Laurent (disambiguation)
- Loren (disambiguation)
