= Laurene =

Laurene is a given name. Notable people with the name include:

- Laurene Powell Jobs (born 1963), American heiress, businesswoman, and executive
- Laurene Landon (born 1957), Canadian-American film and television actress
- Laurene Simms, American educator and hearing advocate.

== See also ==
- Laureen
- Lauren (disambiguation)
- Loreen (disambiguation)
