= Paula Alves =

Portuguese biochemical engineer

Paula Marques Alves
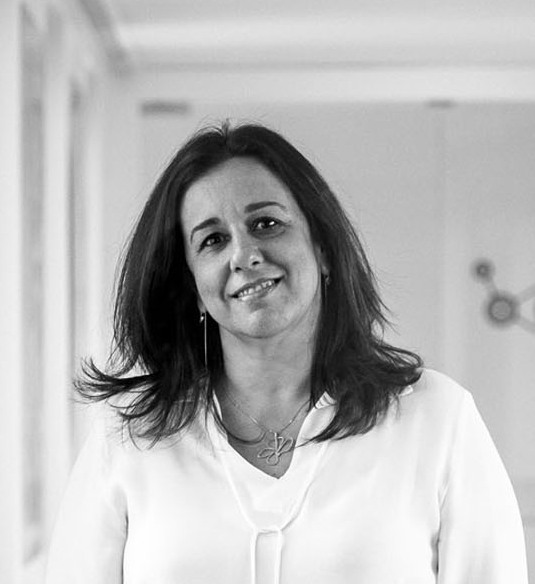
- Born: July 26, 1967 (age 59); Lisbon
- Education: University of Bremen; SINTEF; NOVA University Lisbon; University of Lisbon
- Scientific career
- Workplaces: NOVA University Lisbon

Paula Marques Alves (born 26 July 1967) is a Portuguese biochemical engineer who is a professor at the NOVA University Lisbon. She is the chief executive officer of the Instituto de Biology Experimental e Tecnológica. She was elected a Fellow of the National Academy of Engineering in 2021.

== Early life and education ==
Alves was born in Lisbon. She was an undergraduate student at the University of Lisbon, where she specialized in biochemistry. She moved to the NOVA University Lisbon for graduate studies, where she developed three-dimensional in vitro models for brain cells. For part of her doctoral research she worked in nuclear magnetic resonance at the SINTEF Hospital in Trondheim and the University of Bremen in Germany. After earning her doctorate, she was appointed to the scientific team at the Instituto de Biology Experimental e Tecnológica (IBET).

== Research and career ==
At IBET, Alves held various scientific positions, including assistant and principal investigator. In 2007 she moved to the laboratory of Daniel Wang at Massachusetts Institute of Technology. The following year, she was made executive director of IBET, and in 2012, the chief executive officer.

Alves investigates the metabolism of the cell. Her interest in this area is two-fold; improving the efficiency of biochemical processes and developing sophisticated tools for biological research. She particularly focusses on how biopharmaceuticals are produced and the development of culture systems for cell therapy.

Alves is Chair of the European Society for Animal Cell Technology and has advised the Horizon 2020 board of the European Commission. She is the Editor of the Journal of Biotechnology.

== Awards and honors ==
- 2009 NOVA University Lisbon Scientific Merit Award
- 2017 Top 100 Portuguese Women Scientists
- 2021 Oeiras City Council Gold Medal
- 2021 Elected to the National Academy of Engineering

== Selected publications ==
- António Roldão; Maria Candida M Mellado; Leda R Castilho; Manuel J T Carrondo; Paula Marques Alves (1 October 2010). "Virus-like particles in vaccine development". Expert Review of Vaccines. 9 (10): 1149–1176. doi:10.1586/erv.10.115. ISSN 1476-0584. PMID 20923267. Wikidata Q37798008.
- Margarida Serra; Catarina Brito; Cláudia Correia; Paula M Alves (26 April 2012). "Process engineering of human pluripotent stem cells for clinical application". Trends in Biotechnology. 30 (6): 350–359. doi:10.1016/j.tibtech.2012.03.003. ISSN 0167-7799. PMID 22541338. Wikidata Q38006098.
- Tiago Vicente; António Roldão; Cristina Peixoto; Manuel J T Carrondo; Paula M Alves (1 July 2011). "Large-scale production and purification of VLP-based vaccines". Journal of Invertebrate Pathology. 107 Suppl: S42-8. doi:10.1016/j.jip.2011.05.004. ISSN 0022-2011. PMID 21784230. Wikidata Q37904378.
