= Lauren Baldwin =

Lauren Baldwin may refer to:

- Lauren Anne Baldwin, English actor
- Lauren Fenmore Baldwin, fictional character in The Young and the Restless
