= Hattab =

Hattab is a surname. Notable people with the surname include:

- Al-Hattab (1497–1547 CE), Tripolitanian Maliki scholar.
- Ahmad Abbas Hattab (born 1994), Iraqi footballer
- Dima and Lama Hattab (born 1980), Jordanian long-distance runners
- Hassan Hattab (born 1967), Algerian Islamist rebel
- Jocelyn Hattab (born 1945), French-Tunisian television presenter
- Zineb Hattab (born 1989), Moroccan-Spanish chef
