= Lauren Benton =

Lauren Benton may refer to:

- Lauren Benton (activist)
- Lauren Benton (historian)
