= Lauren Wildbolz =

Swiss chef, entrepreneur and cookbook author (born 1981)

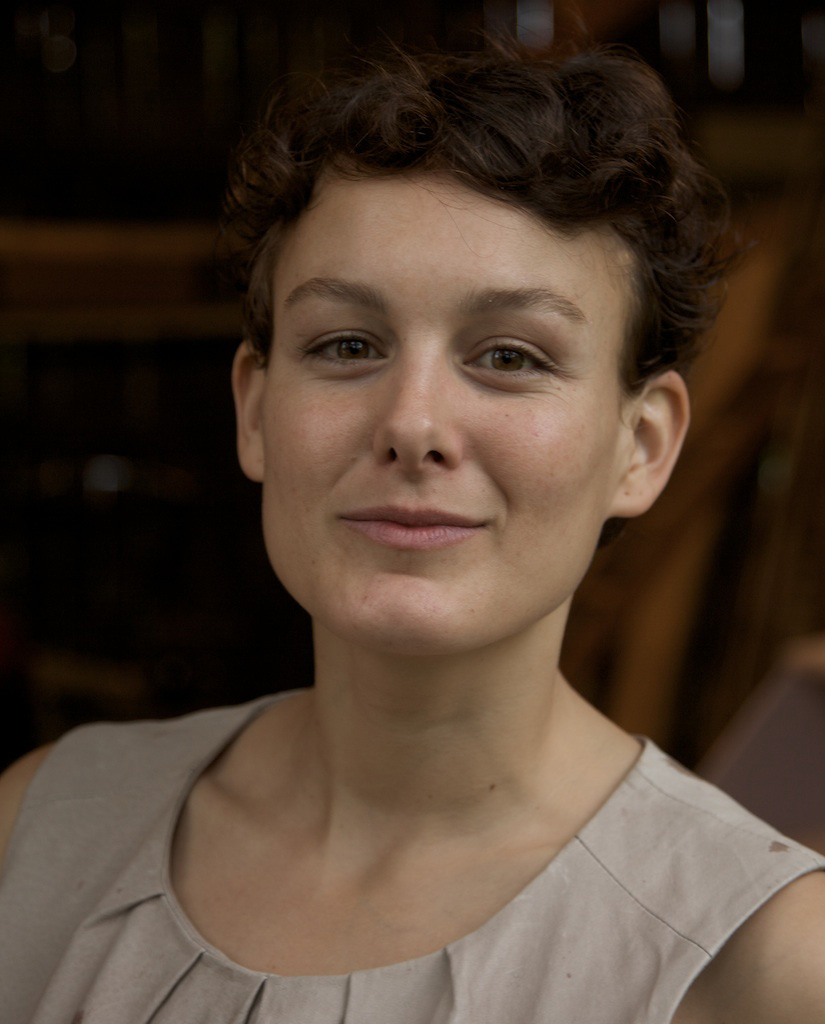
- Wildbolz in 2017
- Born: 1981 (age 44–45); Zürich, Switzerland
- Occupations: Cook, entrepreneur, author
- Years active: 2010–present
- Relatives: Klaus Wildbolz; Eduard Wildbolz
- Website: laurenwildbolz.ch

Lauren Wildbolz (born 17 March 1981), is a Swiss vegan culinary professional, entrepreneur and author of vegan cookbooks. The main focus of her work is veganism, organic and environmentally friendly food, animal welfare and the future of nutrition.

== Early life and education ==
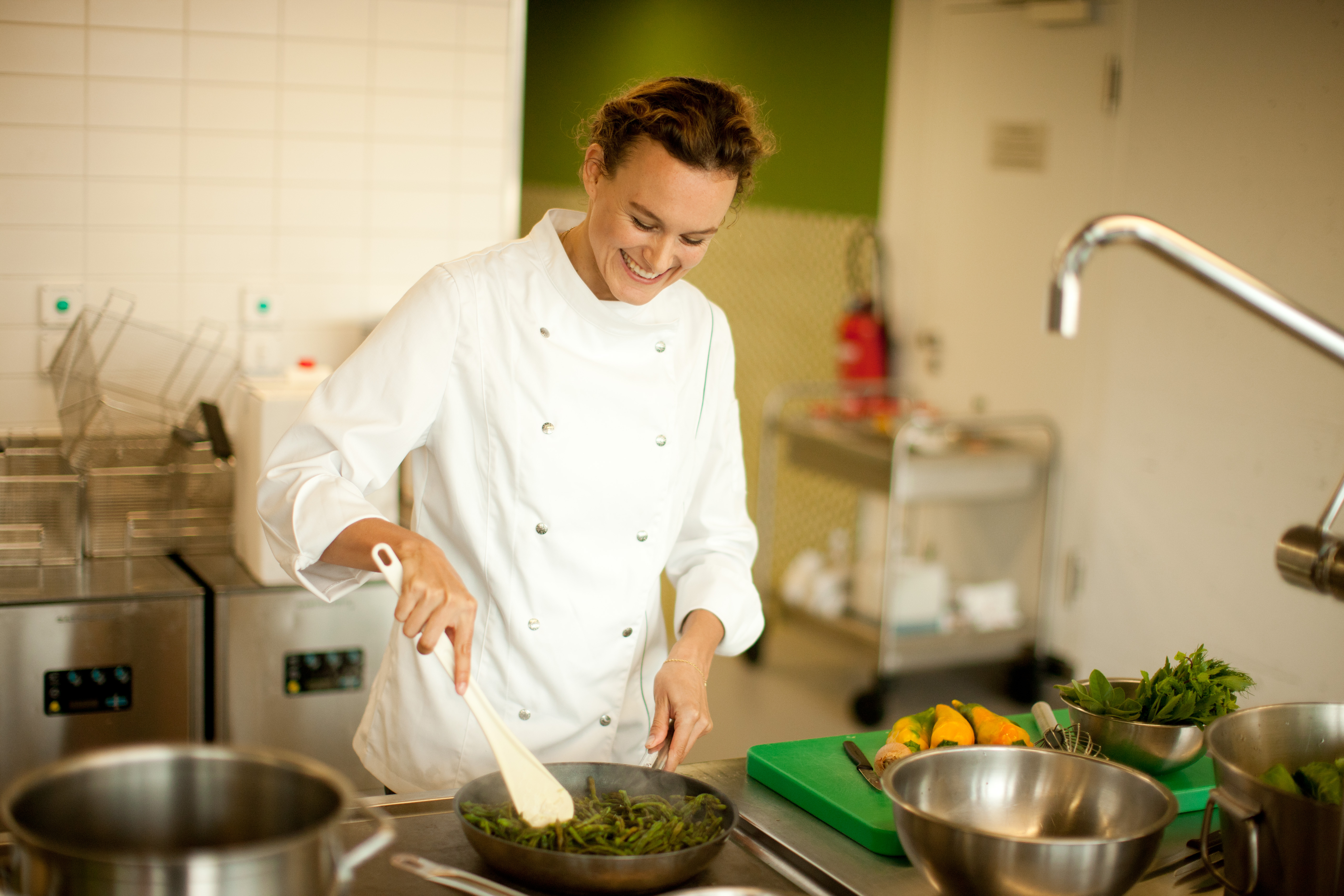
Lauren Wildbolz

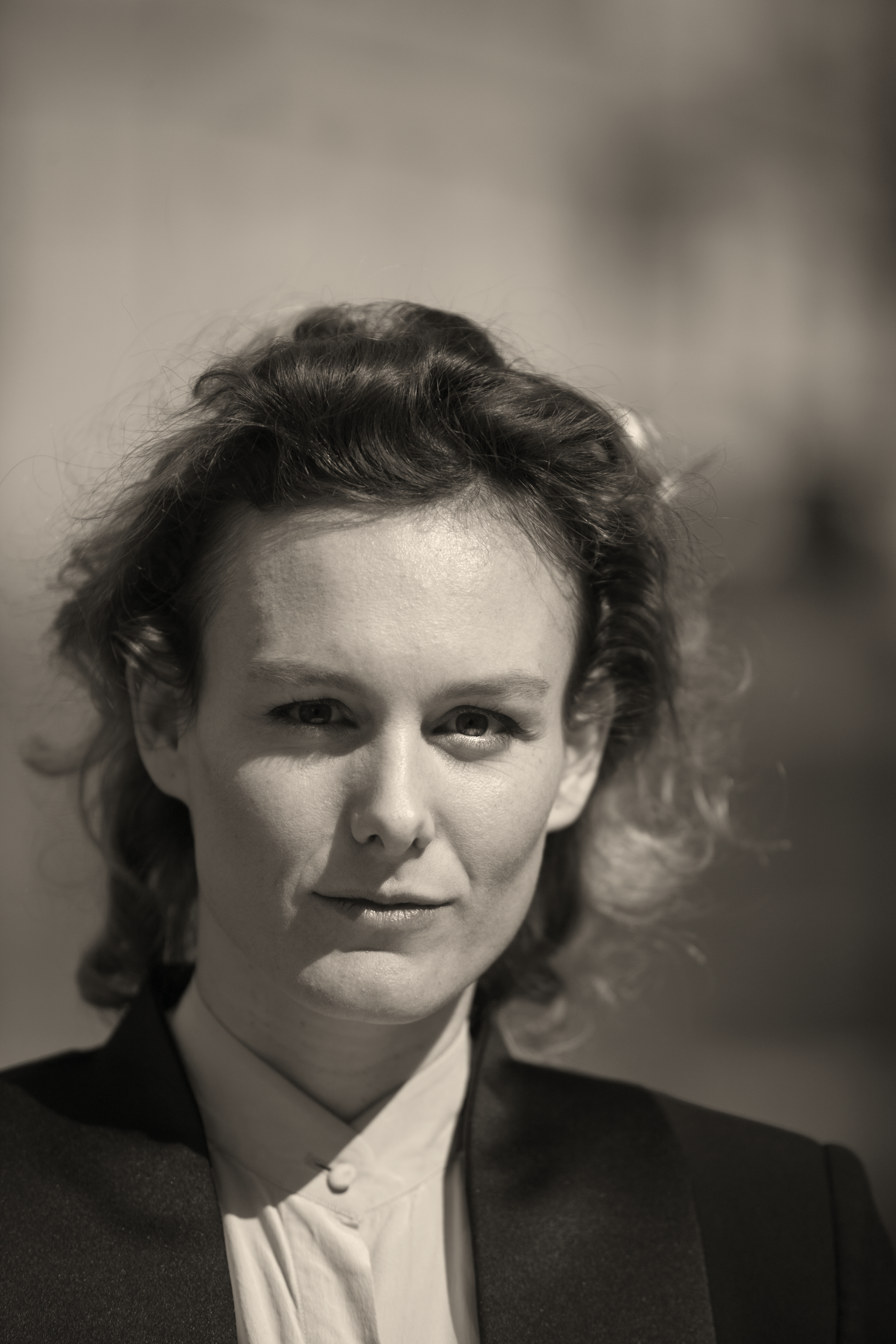
Lauren Wildbolz

Lauren Wildbolz was born to Swiss fashion photographer Jost Wildbolz and model Sandra Wildbolz in 1981 in Zürich. At 14, after reading information about animal suffering, she adopted a vegetarian diet. Wildbolz worked as a diving instructor and trained as a technical diver. She also worked as a vegetarian cook on a ship.

Wildbolz graduated with a bachelor's degree in fine art from the Zurich University of the Arts (ZHdK) in 2013. As part of her bachelor thesis, she created vegan multi-course meals prepared with ingredients gathered by dumpster diving.

Wildbolz continued her academic training at the ZHdK, earning master's degrees in transdisciplinarity and in fine arts, completing her studies in 2015 with the project Dreckskekse (dirt cookies), baking cookies with composted earth. She also explored the overproduction of food, immoderation, famine and the question of an economic solution in her master's thesis. At the age of 27, she decided to adopt a vegan lifestyle.

== Career ==
Wildbolz opened Vegan Kitchen and Bakery, the first vegan restaurant in Switzerland, in 2010. She later sold the restaurant to Soyana, a Swiss company selling organic vegan food.

During the COVID-19 lockdowns, Wildbolz became head chef and was involved in revamping the concept of the Zürich restaurant Maison Blunt, re-branding it to Maison Raison with a vegan menu and organic suppliers. The restaurant was sold to Zineb Hattab in September 2021 and is now operating under the name Dar.

Wildbolz runs a catering business called Future Cuisine, teaches cooking classes and works as a consultant and speaker for plant-based nutrition. She founded a vegan meal kit service, PLANTBOX.

As of April 2022, Wildbolz has released two vegan cookbooks, contributed to others and is working on her next publication about the future of nutrition.

In 2023 she developed a plant-based bar food concept for the Cinchona Bar at the 25hours Hotel Zürich.

In 2024 Wildbolz launched Miss Liquid, a brand of plant-based liquid meal using fermented oat milk, in Zurich, a concept which she initially tested through pop-ups. In 2025 Miss Liquid operated at Zurich Enge railway station, at Zürich Hauptbahnhof and at Paradeplatz; the SFr 17 price of the shakes prompted public debate. Miss Liquid was nominated for the Design Prize Switzerland 2025 in the Food Design category.

She works as an advisor to companies and helps them adopting a sustainable approach.

== Personal life ==
Wildbolz resides in Zürich.

== Publications ==
=== Own works ===
- 2017: Vegan Love (in German), AT Verlag, Aarau, ISBN 978-3038009214
- 2014: Vegan kitchen and friends, l'Age d'Homme, Lausanne, ISBN 978-2825143643

=== Contributions (selection) ===
- 2016: Sophia Hoffmann: Vegan Queens (in German), p.134-155, Edel Books, Hamburg, ISBN 978-3841904782
