= Lorene =

Lorene is a given name. Notable people with the name include:

- Lorene Cary (born 1957), American author, educator, and social activist
- Lorene T. Coates, Democratic member of the North Carolina General Assembly
- Lorene Mann (1937–2013), American country music singer-songwriter
- Lorene Ramsey, American pioneer in women's sports, one of the most successful college coaches of all time
- Lorene Rogers (1914–2009), American biochemist and educator, president of the University of Texas at Austin in the 1970s
- Lorene Scafaria, American screenwriter, playwright, actor and singer known for her work on the 2008 film Nick and Norah's Infinite Playlist
- Lorene Wiswell Wilson (1876–1960), American writer, activist, lecturer, clubwoman
- Lorene Yarnell of Shields and Yarnell, American mime team formed in 1972

== See also ==
- "Lorene (song)", 1960 song by the Louvin Brothers
- Lareine
- Loren (disambiguation)
- Lorena (disambiguation)
- Loraine (disambiguation)
- Loreen (disambiguation)
- Lorraine (disambiguation)
