= Jaclyn Reding =

American novelist

- Born: March 23, 19?? Ohio
- Occupation: Novelist
- Spouse: Steven Reding
- Children: 1
- Writing career
- Pen name: Jaclyn Reding
- Period: 1993 - present
- Genres: Romance, Historical
- Website: www.jaclynreding.com

Jaclyn Reding (born March 23 in Ohio, United States) is an American writer of historical romance novels. She has been a Golden Quill Awards winner and the author of an Amazon.com's #1 bestseller. She also is a National Readers' Choice Awards finalist and has received a nomination for the Romance Writers of America RITA Award.

== Biography ==
Reding first started writing in 1989, Her first book was rejected; she sold her second book in 1992, and it was published in 1993. Since her first novel she has since gone on to publish over a dozen award winning novels.

She has been a Golden Quill Awards winner and a National Readers' Choice Awards finalist. She has received a nomination for the RITA Award for her book The Secret Gift. She is also the author of the Amazon.com #1 bestseller, The Pretender, a Georgian-era Scottish historical.

Reding lives in Massachusetts with her husband, Steven Reding, and their son.

== Bibliography ==
=== Single novels ===
- Deception's Bride, (1993/Sep)
- The Second Chance, (2006/Feb)
- Spellstruck, (2007/Feb)

=== Restoration series ===
1. Tempting Fate, (1995/Jan)
2. Chasing Dreams, (1995/Oct)
3. Stealing Heaven, (1996/Sep)

=== White Regency series ===
1. White Heather, (1997/Aug)
2. White Magic, (1998/Sep)
3. White Knight, (1999/Nov)
4. White Mist, (2000/Nov)

=== The Highland Heroes series ===
1. The Pretender, (2002/Mar)
2. The Adventurer, (2002/Nov)
3. The Secret Gift, (2003/Nov)

=== Anthologies in collaboration ===
- "Written in the Stars" in In Praise of Younger Men, (2001/Mar) (with Jo Beverley, Cathy Maxwell and Lauren Royal)
