= Loreena =

Loreena is a female given name. It may refer to:

- Loreena McKennitt (born 1957), Canadian musician, composer, harpist, accordionist, and pianist who writes, records and performs world music with Celtic and Middle Eastern themes.

== See also ==
- Loreen (disambiguation)
- Lorena (disambiguation)
