= Lauren V. Wood =

American allergist, immunologist

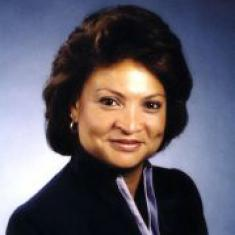
- Education: Oberlin College, BA in biology; Duke University School of Medicine, M.D.
- Scientific career
- Fields: Therapeutic Vaccines; HPV; Hepatitis C; HIV
- Workplaces: National Institutes of Health; National Institute of Allergy and Infectious Diseases; National Cancer Institute

Lauren V. Wood is an American allergist, immunologist, and staff physician at the National Cancer Institute (NCI) at the National Institutes of Health (NIH) in Bethesda, Maryland, where she has served as a principal investigator. She is known for conducting studies of vaccines for cancer, human papillomavirus (HPV), hepatitis C, and HIV especially for use with children, teens and young adults. She holds the rank of captain in the U.S. Public Health Service (PHS).

== Education ==
Wood earned a B.A. degree in biology from Oberlin College and in 1984 received her M.D. degree from Duke University School of Medicine. She completed a combined residency in internal medicine and pediatrics at Baylor College of Medicine Affiliated Hospitals in Houston, Texas. She became board certified in both specialties.

== Career ==
Wood's clinical research interests include therapeutic vaccines and immune-based therapies for cancer and HIV infection, as well as research on other chronic viral infections such as (HPV) and hepatitis C. She also conducts investigations of HIV and HPV transmission and associated risk behaviors.

Wood was awarded a fellowship at the National Institute of Allergy and Infectious Diseases (NIAID) and spent two years in the laboratory of now NIAID-director Anthony S. Fauci, M.D., where she conducted investigations of HIV-specific cellular and humoral immune responses. She then worked for a year with NIAID's Henry Masur, M.D. and H. Clifford Lane, M.D. in that Institute's HIV/AIDS Clinical Research Program.

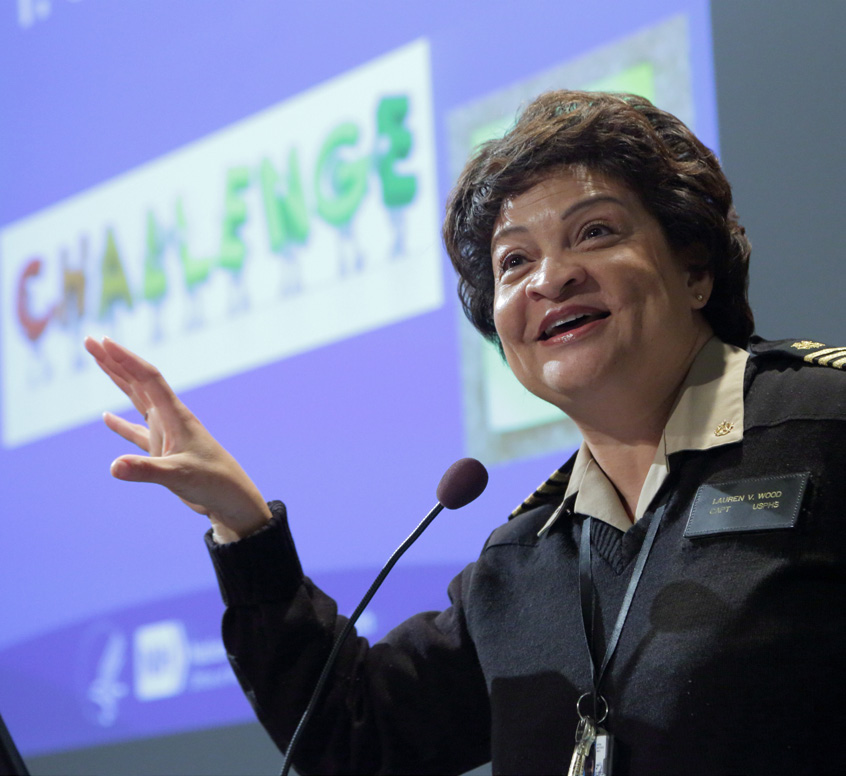
Lauren Wood was the keynote speaker for the event, “Meet the Faces of Clinical Research: Beyond Inclusion,” co-sponsored by NIH's Office of Research on Women's Health and FDA's Office on Women's Health. May 14, 2015

In 1992, she was recruited to the NCI by Philip A. Pizzo, M.D. She served as a senior staff member of the NCI Pediatric HIV Working Group, first under Pizzo and subsequently under Robert Yarchoan, M.D. In 1994, she was promoted to Senior Surgeon. At NCI, her clinical research focused on the investigation of antiretroviral agents and immune-based therapies in HIV-infected children, adolescents, and young adults, including the initial studies of lamivudine (3TC) and ritonavir that led to FDA approval for use in children. Wood also conducted studies of recombinant IL-2, HIV therapeutic vaccines and adherence to antiretroviral treatment. With other NCI colleagues, Wood also conducted investigations of the infectious, malignant, and psychosocial complications of pediatric HIV disease. In 2005, Wood joined the newly formed the Vaccine Branch at NCI and was charged with developing a clinical translational research program, which she now heads.

At the NCI, she is responsible for the bench-to-bedside clinical translation and implementation of in-human studies investigating novel vaccine platforms and immune-based therapies for cancer and HIV infection.

Wood's research extends to investigations of the TCRγ-alternative reading frame protein (TARP) peptide cancer vaccine in prostate cancer patients with PSA biochemical recurrence, a form of immunotherapy discovered by NCI veteran investigator Dr. Ira Pastan. A novel and potentially promising is the TARP is found in more than 90 percent of prostate cancers and about 50 percent of breast cancers. Her work and research has been published in the Annals of Internal Medicine, The Pediatric Infectious Disease Journal, AIDS and Behavior, The Archives of Dermatology, The Journal of Clinical Microbiology, The Expert Review of Vaccines, Seminars in Oncology, The American Journal of Roentgenology, Blood, The Journal of Immunology, AIDS Patient Care and STDs, The Journal of Acquired Immune Deficiency Syndromes, Mitochondrion, The Annals of the New York Academy of Sciences, AIDS Care, The Journal of Translational Medicine, Molecular Therapy, and others. In addition to publishing in peer-reviewed journals, she has also served as a reviewer for the Journal of Pediatrics and as an associate editor for Clinical and Diagnostic Laboratory Immunology.

== Honors ==
In addition to authoring numerous scientific publications and presenting her research at national and international scientific meetings, Wood has served on multiple FDA, White House, and other interagency advisory, review and data safety monitoring committees. She is assistant professor at the Uniformed Services University of the Health Sciences (USUHS). She is a member of the board of directors of the NIH Children's Inn.
