= Girl Meets Ghost =

Novel series by Lauren Barnholdt

- First edition cover
- Author: Lauren Barnholdt
- Language: English
- Genre: novel
- Publisher: Aladdin
- Publication date: 2013 -
- Publication place: United States
- Media type: Print

Girl Meets Ghost is a children's novel series launched in 2013 by author Lauren Barnholdt about a tween girl who can see and talk with ghosts as she helps them move on to the afterlife, though what happens when ghosts "move on" is unclear.

== Girl Meets Ghost (2013) ==
Daniella, the insistent and annoying ghost of a High School gymnast, demands Kendall's attention to help her "move on". Kendall would rather be spending her time worrying about a boy she has a crush on, Brandon, and her less than stellar math grades. Kendall's best friend Ellie is apparently in love with Brandon's unpredictable friend, Kyle, and Brandon keeps running into Kendall doing strange things like talking to herself (actually to ghosts) and digging in a graveyard. The ghost of Brandon's mom begins haunting Kendall and apparently warning her off of Brandon, though they have started dating. Kendall tries to convince Daniella's friend, Jen, to unwittingly help her solve the mystery of Daniella's haunting while Kendall is also worrying about the relationship between her dad and his friend Cindy. Kendall discovers that Daniella and Jen fought over a boy that Jen had dated first and that Jen's anger leads her to refuse Daniella a ride to a gymnastics meet. Daniella takes an ill-fated bus and dies, leaving Jen feeling responsible. Kendall, claiming to be a friend of Daniella's, mediates between the ghost and Jen and Daniella is able to move on when Jen believes that Daniella does not blame her.

== The Harder the Fall (2013) ==
Kendall is visited by Lyra, the ghost of a fashionable teen who wanted to be a scientist, while the ghost's mother, struggling with depression following her daughter's death, is quickly going bankrupt and about to lose her business (an understaffed and under-equipped "spa"). Meanwhile, Kendall learns that Brandon's mother—whose ghost is now haunting her with increasing force—was friends in school with Kendall's absent mother. While apple picking with her father, Cindy, and Brandon, Kendall's father unexpectedly proposes to Cindy in public by giving her a "promise ring", which throws Kendall's home-life into turmoil. To make matters worse, things with Brandon are not going that well as a potential love interest enters the scene at school just as Kendall is behaving increasingly erratic, and Ellie is increasingly suspicious that Kendall is hiding something.

== Ghost of a Chance (2014) ==
While assisting a ghost named Lyra, Kendall began spending time with Lyra's brother, Micah. As a result, Kendall's boyfriend and best friend have stopped speaking to her. Additionally, her father's relationship with his girlfriend, Cindy, has become more serious, and Kendall must assist the ghost of her rival's sister, Lily. Overwhelmed by these events, Kendall decides to visit her mother who left Kendall when she was a baby to seek answers regarding her ability to see ghosts, anticipating that her mother knows the truth before the situation deteriorates further.

== Characters ==
=== Recurring characters ===
- Kendall Williams—The protagonist of the series, Kendall is a 12-year-old who sees and talks to ghosts. She helps the ghosts to "move on" by solving the mystery about the reason for their haunting, though she has no idea where they go afterwards.
- Bob Williams—Kendall's single parent father. Kendall's mother left when Kendall was a baby.
- Cindy Pollack—A friend and confidant of Mr. William's, Kendall worries that Cindy is trying to work her way into the family.
- Ellie Wilimena—Kendall's best friend and confidant in everything except that Kendall sees ghosts. The secret of the ghosts is a source of tension for Kendall.
- Brandon Dunham—Kendall's love interest. He is continually running into Kendall at awkward moments when she is helping Daniella.
- John Dunham—Brandon's widower father. He is an illustrator of children's books.
- Grace Dunham—Brandon's little sister. She likes to pretend she is a karate master.
- Julie (Collier) Dunham—The ghost of Brandon's mother who died a few years before. She frightens Kendall and apparently wants her to stay away from Brandon.
- Kyle—Brandon's occasionally difficult best friend and the love interest of Ellie.
- Mrs. D'Amico—Long time friend of Kendall's deceased grandmother, Mrs. D'Amico is the head of the English Department at Kendall's school and lets her and Ellie hang out in her office and drink coffee and tea.
- Mr. Jacobi—Kendall's math teacher who apparently does not like her very much.
- Kyle's Mom—She mainly gives the kids rides, but questions Kendall about her interest in theater when Kendall is overheard talking to ghosts and uses "practicing a monologue" as an excuse (Book 1).

=== Girl Meets Ghost ===
- Daniella—A ghost who needs Kendall's help to "move on". She is a former award-winning High-school gymnast who died in a bus wreck.
- Jen Higgins—A gymnast and friend of Daniella's. Jen is the focus of Daniella's inability to "move on".
- Travis Santini—Love interest of both Daniella and Jen. A fight over Travis leads indirectly to Daniella's death.
- Mitch Huntsman—A basketball player Kendall questions to find Jen.

=== The Harder the Fall ===
- Lyra—the ghost who visits Kendall for help.
- Sharon—Lyra's depressed mother who owns a salon/spa that is going bankrupt.
- Micah—Lyra's brother.
- Madison Baker—A pretty and popular girl at Kendall's school who takes an interest in Brandon.

=== Ghost of a Chance ===
Lily — A ghost that Kendall helps move on; Madison's older sister.

Maura — One of Madison's minions

== Critical reception ==
Reviewers found this first installment in the nascent series intriguing and fun. Kirkus Reviews, for example, claims "Barnholdt keeps the narrative light and her characters chirpy. Kendall might get discouraged, but she's always ready to bounce back with a new hairstyle or a spiffy outfit. Much of the comedy comes from Kendall's attempts to explain her increasingly outlandish actions as she tries to hide the truth about her ghosts. Funny and bubbly" while Publishers Weekly claims "Barnholdt provides steady suspense and approaches dark topics with a refreshing dose of levity". Lana Barnes from The Horn Book Guide gave the book a four out of six rating, feeling the author's tween voice is genuine, but the separate plot lines in the novel "lack a solid connection."

== See also ==
- 2013 in literature
- Children's Literature

== Further references ==
- Bernstein, Allison and Shelley Glantz. Review. Library Media Connection. Aug/Sep 2013 (32.1): p. 66.
