= Laurin =

Laurin is both a surname and a given name. Notable people with the name include:

== Surname ==
- Anna-Lena Laurin (born 1962), Swedish composer
- Camille Laurin (1922–1999), psychiatrist and politician in Quebec, Canada
- Dan Laurin (born 1960), Swedish recorder player
- Georges-Philippe Laurin (1892–1964), Quebec politician
- Joseph Laurin (1811–1888), Quebec author and politician
- Lucien Laurin (1912–2000), French-Canadian jockey and horse trainer
- Maria Laurin (1858–1920), Swedish opera singer
- Rachel Laurin (1961–2023), Canadian organist, composer and music educator
- René Laurin (born 1940), Quebec politician
- Rene-Georges Laurin (died 2006), member of the World War II French Resistance and politician
- Václav Laurin (1865–1930), Czech engineer, entrepreneur and industrialist

== Given name ==
- Laurin Pepper (born 1931), former Major League Baseball pitcher
- Laurin Lyman Williams (1895–1975), US Army Lieutenant General
- Laurin D. Woodworth (1837–1897), American politician
- Laurin Böhler (born 1995), Austrian Judoka

== See also ==
- Lauren
- Lauryn
