= Loren (disambiguation) =

Loren is both a given name and surname.

Loren or Løren may also refer to:

- Løren Line, Norwegian line of the Oslo Metro
- Løren (station), Norwegian underground rapid transit station of the Oslo Metro
- Loren Bridge, spanning the river Loren between the towns of Lavrentiya and Lorino in Russia's Far East.
- Loren Nunataks, Queen Elizabeth Land, Antarctica
- Lorenzo Jesús Morón García (born 1993), Spanish footballer known as Loren
- Lorenzo Juarros García (born 1966), Spanish retired footballer known as Loren
- Lorenzo Morón (born 1970), Spanish retired footballer and manager known as Loren
- Loren (kickboxer), Spanish kickboxer Lorenzo Javier Jorge (born 1984)
- Løren (musician), South Korean musician (born January 10, 1995)

== See also ==
- Lorena (disambiguation)
- Lorene (given name)
- Loreen (disambiguation)
- Loran (disambiguation)
- Lauren (disambiguation)
- Lauren (given name)
