= Behind the Velvet Ropes =

American fashion television series

- Title card
- Genre: Fashion; Interview; Documentary
- Created by: Earl Crittenden
- Presented by: Earl Crittenden (1984–early 1990s); Lauren Ezersky (early 1990s–2012)
- Country of origin: United States
- Original language: English
- No. of seasons: 20+
- No. of episodes: 1000+

Production
- Executive producer: Lauren Ezersky
- Producer: Lauren Ezersky
- Running time: 30 minutes

Original release
- Network: Public-access television (1984–1999); Style Network (1999–2012)
- Release: 1984 – 2012

Behind the Velvet Ropes was an American fashion-focused television series best known for being hosted by journalist Lauren Ezersky. Originally launched on public-access television in New York City in 1984, the show aired for more than two decades, ultimately gaining broader distribution via the Style Network in the late 1990s.

The series was known for its unfiltered interviews and Ezersky's eccentric personal style, and developed a cult following.

== Format and content ==
Episodes featured behind-the-scenes coverage of fashion shows, showroom tours, trunk shows, red carpet events, and fashion week presentations. Ezersky conducted unscripted interviews with designers, models, celebrities, and stylists, often delivering commentary in her signature, humorous tone.

She once described herself as a "total animal" when it comes to fashion. The series covered the exclusive culture of the fashion world in a way Ezersky made accessible to a wider audience.

== History ==
Behind the Velvet Ropes debuted in 1984, created and originally hosted by Earl Crittenden. After Ezersky's early appearances, she assumed full hosting duties in the early 1990s. She also became the show's executive producer.

In 1999, the program was picked up by the Style Network, a division of E! Entertainment Television, which increased its visibility and international distribution. Ezersky was known for shooting up to five segments per day and delivering hundreds of episodes annually. Ezersky faced pushback from network executives who found her style "too New York."

== Guests and impact ==
The show regularly featured prominent fashion figures, including Marc Jacobs, Calvin Klein, Karl Lagerfeld, Betsey Johnson, Isaac Mizrahi, and Gianni Versace. Supermodels such as Cindy Crawford and Linda Evangelista, as well as entertainers like RuPaul and Molly Ringwald, also appeared. Photographer Helmut Newton was one of the show's most celebrated interviewees.

It attracted over 60 million viewers worldwide during its run, and was broadcast up to ten times per week during its peak. The show drew a following in Japan, where fans trailed Ezersky during fashion events and chanted her name.

== Legacy ==
Behind the Velvet Ropes aired before the rise of digital influencers and fashion blogging. In a 2022 interview, Ezersky described the series as part of a "golden age" of fashion coverage.

Ezersky has uploaded archival episodes to her personal YouTube channel, including footage from 1997 and 1998. The segments include fashion week coverage, designer interviews, and showroom footage. Selected episodes have also been made available via WOW Presents Plus, a streaming service focused on fashion and LGBTQ+ programming.
