= Lauryn =

Lauryn is a given name. Notable people with the name include:

- Lauryn Canny, Irish former child actress
- Lauryn Chandler, American author of contemporary romance novels
- Lauryn Hill (born 1975), American recording artist, musician, producer and actress
- Lauryn Mark, Olympic Women's Skeet shooter from Australia
- Lauryn Ogilvie, Australian sport shooter
- Lauryn Williams (born 1983), track and field sprint athlete, competing internationally for the United States
- Lauryn Lawler, British-Finnish Model and actress
- Lauryn (Pumpkin) Shannon, Reality TV Star

== See also ==
- Lauren
- Laurin
