= Laureen =

Laureen is a given name. Notable people with the name include:

- Laureen Harper (born 1963), the wife of Canada's 22nd Prime Minister Stephen Harper
- Laureen Jarrett (born 1938), teacher and former political figure in New Brunswick, Canada
- Laureen Maxwell (born 2002), French high jumper
- Laureen Oliver, American politician who co-founded the New York State Independence Party

== See also ==
- Lauren (given name)
- Lauren (disambiguation)
- Loreen (Swedish singer)
- Loreen (disambiguation)
- Loren (disambiguation)
