= Lauren Von Der Pool =

American chef (born c. 1984)

- Born: 1984 or 1985 (age 40–41); Washington, D.C., U.S.

Lauren Von Der Pool (born c. 1984) is an American vegan chef.

== Early life ==
Born in Washington D.C., Von Der Pool describes herself in her early life as a "bad girl" and "gangster." When a stab wound to the head at the age of sixteen proved almost fatal, Von Der Pool decided to make a new life for herself with a complete lifestyle change. She began to transform her relationship with food, and she experimented with raw and vegan cooking. With the advice from a mentor, Von Der Pool enrolled at the Le Cordon Bleu Los Angeles and Paris Culinary School.

== Career ==
Upon graduating from Le Cordon Bleu, Von Der Pool worked with many notable chefs, including Wolfgang Puck and Alice Waters. Von Der Pool has also worked as a personal chef for many prominent celebrities, like Patti LaBelle, Common, Stevie Wonder, Venus and Serena Williams (Venus Williams wrote the foreword for her cookbook Eat Yourself Sexy.) For three years, Von Der Pool worked exclusively for the sisters, teasingly claiming, "I ate, drank, and slept Serena and Venus" during her Miami New Times interview in 2015.

=== Let's Move! Campaign ===
One of the most significant highlights of her career occurred in 2009 when First Lady Michelle Obama invited Von Der Pool to serve as an executive chef for "Let's Move!"—the First Lady's childhood obesity prevention campaign. As Von Der Pool has dedicated much of her own career as a chef conveying the importance of healthy eating, she was honored to accept the position, stating, "working with Michelle Obama spiraled into such a beautiful thing because I've been able to help so many people. The whole movement has been very good to me, and I'm just grateful to be part of it."

=== Chopped ===
Von Der Pool made a television appearance on the Food Network TV Show Chopped (Season 18 Episode 4, "Waste Not"). According to Food Network, she repeatedly rolled her eyes and called out contestant Sarah Pouzar. When the judges made negative comments about her plating, she justified her choices by saying that she had strategically plated her food for the ultimate enjoyment and convenience of the eater. This did not change the judges' viewpoints. After being chopped in the second round, Von Der Pool said about her competitor - "Her s*** was soggy!" She ended her outburst, stating things like, "How the hell did I get chopped?" and "You will see me again, all over your television screens". Von Der Pool appeared on a Redemption episode of Chopped (Season 19 Episode 2) but was eliminated after the first round, when she served professional chefs a salad with an overly sweet dressing, raw red onions (which judge Scott Conant is infamous for despising) and cucumber skins. Again she had an outburst saying, "I'm embarrassed! I'm so embarrassed!"

== Cookbook ==
Von Der Pool released a vegan cookbook, Eat Yourself Sexy! The Goddess Edition, to demonstrate how eating fresh, locally grown, environmentally sustainable food can still be tasty. It also claims to be a guide for "glowing skin," "healthy hair," "weight loss" and "wellness." Overall, consumer reception has been positive. Civil rights activist and comedian Dick Gregory said, "Eat Yourself Sexy! Is one of the best vegan and living foods books I have seen in a long time."
