= Lauren Geremia =

American interior designer

- Born: 1982 (age 43–44); Wallingford, Connecticut
- Education: Rhode Island School of Design
- Occupation: Interior designer

Lauren Geremia (born 1982) is an American interior designer based in the San Francisco Bay Area.

Lauren Geremia was born in 1982 in Wallingford, Connecticut. Characterized as an "upstart designer for tech," her clients include Instagram (she designed its South Park office), and Dropbox (she designed its San Francisco office). Geremia graduated in 2004 from the Rhode Island School of Design with a degree in painting. Her diverse installations have included paper airplanes and tinted ping pong balls.
