= Loreen (disambiguation) =

Loreen is the stage name of Swedish singer and songwriter Lorine Zineb Nora Talhaoui.

Loreen may also refer to:

- Loreen Ruth Bannis-Roberts (born 1966), Dominican politician and diplomat
- Loreen Hall (born 1967), English sprinter
- Loreen Olson, American scholar
- Loreen Ngwira (born 1993), Malawian netball player
- Loreen Rice Lucas (1914–2011), Canadian author
- Loreen Tshuma (born 1996), Zimbabwean cricketer
- Jack Loreen (c. 1901–after 1935), American record setter at being buried alive
- "Loreen" (song), 1986 song by the German singer Sandra

== See also ==
- Laureen
- Loren (disambiguation)
- Lorene
- Loreena
