= Lauron =

Lauron may refer to:

- Battle of Lauron, a battle in 76 BC involving ancient Rome
- LAURON, six-legged walking robot from Germany
- Lauron (moth), a genus of moths
