= Lauren Taylor (journalist) =

English broadcast journalist (born 1970)

Lauren Taylor (born 11 May 1970) is an English broadcast journalist, currently working for BBC News.

== Education ==
Taylor was educated at the Lycée international de Saint-Germain-en-Laye. She graduated with an MA from the University of Oxford. She then obtained a Diploma in Journalism from the City University in London. As well as her native English, Taylor is fluent in German and Italian and also speaks French and Arabic.

== Career ==
=== ITV News ===
Taylor joined ITV News in 1992 as a graduate trainee. She covered events such as the death of Princess Diana, the IRA bombing in Manchester, and ETA violence in Spain. In 2004, she became a political correspondent and reported on the 2004 US Presidential Election. The following year, she broadened her experience by becoming an economics correspondent, reporting on a range of business stories.

=== Al Jazeera English ===
Taylor worked for Al Jazeera English since its launch in 2006 till 2023. Initially, she was based at the main broadcast centre in Doha, Qatar, as a senior news anchor.

She worked primarily as a London anchor on the flagship programme Newshour, presenting news of events across Europe and also conducting live interviews for updates and breaking news. She used to return occasionally to Doha as a relief anchor. Taylor was also seen on Al Jazeera America during that channel's simulcast of Newshour.

When based in Doha, Taylor also did stints as a field correspondent, reporting on terrorism in Yemen, Lebanon, Egypt and Morocco. She also worked in Iraq, as an embedded journalist with a US army unit searching for Improvised Explosive Devices (IED) in Baghdad.

=== BBC News ===
Since December 2023, Taylor has worked as a news presenter and anchor on BBC News, broadcasting in more than 200 countries.
