= Lauren Williams (journalist) =

American journalist

Lauren Williams is an American journalist. She previously worked as an editor at The Root and Mother Jones and joined Vox in 2014. Williams left the organization in the role of editor-in-chief in 2021. She is the co-founder of the nonprofit news organization Capital B.

== Career ==
Williams joined The Root as an associate editor in 2010. She was promoted to deputy editor in December 2011 and worked in that role for 2.5 years. She later worked as a story editor at Mother Jones before she was hired at Vox.

Williams joined Vox as managing editor in 2014 two months after it launched. She was named executive editor in 2017 and nine months later she was promoted to editor-in-chief, taking over for Ezra Klein, and also held the duties of senior vice president. During her tenure she oversaw Vox.com's business operations and editorial departments, the YouTube channel, a slate of podcasts, and its television programming.

She departed Vox in February 2021 to launch the Black-oriented news platform Capital B with Akoto Ofori-Atta, whom she met in 2010 while working at The Root. Williams described the platform as "a first-of-its kind, local-national hybrid nonprofit news organization for Black Americans". She is the organization's CEO and Ofori-Atta is the executive editor. Capital B launched in January 2022 with approximately $9.4 million in funding. It has a website covering national news and local news bureau based in Atlanta.

== Personal life ==
Williams is married.
