= Lauren Galley =

Spokesperson and author (born 1995)

Lauren Marie Galley
- Born: January 10, 1995 (age 31)
- Education: Sam Houston State University
- Occupations: Author; Speaker
- Known for: President of Girls Above Society

Lauren Marie Galley (born January 10, 1995), is a multi-media spokesperson, author and entrepreneur.

== Print media ==
In 2013, Galley published Girls Above Society: Steps To Success: An Empowerment Guide. It was released by Girls Above Society. In 2014 it was released by Cosby Media Productions in Ebook Format. In 2015, Galley published Kissing Frogs: In Search of Prince Charming, It was released by Cosby Media Productions in paperback and Ebook Format.

Galley is a regular contributor to Huffington Post.

== Television ==
Galley has appeared as a guest contributor for television news shows, commenting on social issues faced by the Millennials. She has appeared and been featured for local affiliates across major networks such as Fox News and CNN commenting on social pressures tween and teen girls are facing in today's media driven society. Galley has also appeared on ABC Family's The Lying Game and CBS "Chase" TV Series.

== Spokesperson and philanthropy ==
Galley was named a Game-Changer by The White House Inaugural United State of Women Summit in 2016. Galley served as an official ambassador for Secret Deodorant's Mean Stinks Campaign in 2015.

In 2014–2015, Galley became an ambassador for Secret Deodorant in conjunction with Teen Vogue Magazine, traveling throughout the U.S. delivering a peer-to-peer relatable voice to girls with a message of kindness and support, ending the girl on girl bullying in their generation. Galley created Girls Above Society], a non-profit organization dedicated to empowering girls to be confident leaders of their generation in 2010 at age fifteen. Her "GIRL TALK" program impacts girls of all economic values to achieve positive self-worth and confidence through mentorship and tools as they face tough pressures of today's media driven society. Galley's TEDx Tomball's Talk titled #TextMe The Elimination of Human Interaction gives relevant insight on how technology is affecting face-to-face communication within the Millennial Generation. In October 2015, Galley was a speaker at the iMatter Conference, an event hosted by the Simi Valley chapter of Soroptimists International.
