= Lauren Flaherty =

Business woman

- Education: Syracuse University
- Occupation: Chief Marketing Officer
- Employer: CA Technologies
- Title: Chief marketing officer and executive vice president, CA Technologies.
- Successor: Incumbent
- Website: www.ca.com

Lauren Flaherty was the chief marketing officer and executive vice president of CA Technologies, an enterprise software firm.

She joined CA in August 2013, after two consecutive CMO roles with Juniper Networks and Nortel Networks and a 25-year marketing career at IBM. In addition to her role at CA, Flaherty serves on the board of directors for Xactly Corporation.

Prior to joining CA, Flaherty served as CMO of Juniper Networks. At Nortel, Flaherty was responsible for all marketing and built the first fully integrated marketing operating model, aligning corporate, product and regional marketing to unified execution, financial management and results reporting.

Flaherty’s career in IBM marketing spanned 25 years. She held senior executive roles in IBM Corporate Marketing, Software and Systems Business Units and Latin America, and was a member of the IBM CEO Senior Leadership Team. Flaherty was the lead for all IBM global brand and advertising programs in the mid-1990s.

== Early life and education ==
Flaherty holds a bachelor's degree from Syracuse University, New York. She is married, has two children and lives in New York City.
