= Laurene Simms =

Deaf American educator

Academic background
- Education: University of Nebraska–Lincoln (BS); Western Maryland College (M.Ed.); University of Arizona (PhD)

Academic work
- Discipline: Education
- Sub-discipline: Deaf education; Language acquisition; Bilingualism
- Institutions: Indiana School for the Deaf; Gallaudet University

Dr. Laurene Simms is a Deaf American educator and advocate. She served as an interim Chief Bilingual Officer at Gallaudet University for 3 years before being promoted to a permanent position. In the summer of 2025, she was demoted to a faculty position. In 2000, she became the first Black alumna from the Indiana School for the Deaf to earn a doctorate.

== Early life and education ==
Laurene Simms was born in Texas, then moved to Indiana. She was born on May 16, 1942. Laurene Simms was one of seven children born to Rosa Lee and Frank Simms. Her mother managed the home, while her father was a maintenance worker. She became profoundly deaf after complications from polio as a child.

After initially attending a mainstream oral school, Simms transferred to the Indiana School for the Deaf (ISD). She has discussed how a lack of resources and knowledge about how best to educate Deaf children contributed to her initial enrollment at an oral school. After struggling to keep up in an oral school, she graduated from ISD in 1972 as Valedictorian. She is the first Black alumna from ISD to earn a doctorate.

Simms attended the University of Nebraska–Lincoln for her Bachelor of Science in Elementary Education, graduating in 1986. The next year, she earned her Master of Education in Deaf Education from Western Maryland College (now McDaniel College). In 2000, she earned her Doctor of Philosophy in Language, Reading and Culture with a minor in Teaching and Teacher Education from the University of Arizona.

== Career ==
Simms decided to become a teacher after graduating as Valedictorian in her ISD program. After attending university for her B.S. and M.Ed., she returned to the Indiana School for the Deaf to teach, and eventually became Principal. She is now Chief Bilingual Officer at Gallaudet University, where she teaches classes such as "Introduction to Education and Teaching", "Literacy Applications in ASL/English Bilingual Classrooms K-12", and "Language Arts in Elementary Education". In addition to teaching, Simms serves on several boards, including Deaf Women of Color (DWC) Inc., and the Sociolinguistics in the Deaf Community Editorial Board.

Simms also co-authored the "Visual Communication & Sign Language Checklist", a standardized system for tracking ASL benchmarks from birth to age 5.

In 2005, she formed the nonprofit organization Deaf Women of Color (DWC) Inc. with Leticia Arellano, Francisca Rangel, and Thuan Nguyen, to create professional development opportunities for Deaf women of color.

== Advocacy and leadership ==
In addition to her work as an educator, Simms has long been an advocate in the Deaf community. She is on the leadership board of Deaf Women of Color, an organization she founded in 2005 with Leticia Arellano, Thuan Nguyen-Lakrik, and Francisca Rangel, which provides educational and professional development opportunities for Deaf women of color, including annual conferences. They created an online community called "Overlooked Gems" on their website and Facebook page, where Deaf women of color can share their experiences and promote their businesses.

Simms has also been involved in the National Black Deaf Advocates (NBDA) for over 15 years. NBDA activities include a pageant for black Deaf women, leadership training for youth, professional development opportunities, senior citizen programs, and they have collaborated with Gallaudet to create a Black Deaf history archive. Simms served as Alternate Eastern Regional Representative from 2005 to 2006, Regional Representative from 2006 to 2010, and Alternate Representative again from 2016 to 2018. She was also appointed as director of their Collegiate Black Deaf Student Leadership Institute (CBDSLI) program in 2005. Simms was the plenary speaker at the 2019 conference.

Simms also served as Program Coordinator of the National Deaf People of Color Conference in both 2007 and 2010, a conference which includes discussions of topics ranging from diversity in the classroom, to interpreting, to mental health.

In media appearances, she has provided her expert opinion on how to support Deaf and hard-of-hearing students during the COVID-19 pandemic.

== Documentary ==
On May 14, 2018, Simms released a 40-minute YouTube documentary titled Climbing the Avalanche on YouTube. Simms directed and produced the film, featuring the life experiences of a number of activists and Deaf people of color (Victoria Monroe, Dr. Paddy Ladd, Dr. Kimberlé Crenshaw, Erica Hossler, Chad Wolfe, David Hamilton, Aurora Frias, Nha Kim).

In the documentary, Simms and the participants discuss the journey of rediscovering one's identity, the concept of intersectionality, the growing population of Deaf and hearing children of color, and her argument for better service to and inclusion of students of color in mainstream educational spaces and curricula.

In the documentary, Simms describes "climbing the avalanche" as "the challenge that many people of color feel as they struggle through a mountain of obstacles to attain their goals while consistently being swept up in an "avalanche" of whiteness." Anecdotes from participants include the effect of disproportionate representation in the school resulting in exclusion, discrimination around hair and food, and the implicit pressure placed on students of color to compensate for an imperfect education system.

== Honors and awards ==
- 2018, Indiana School for the Deaf (ISD) elementary school building renamed Laurene Simms Hall
- 2019 Deafpeople.com Deaf Person of the Year
- 2020 Indiana School for the Deaf (ISD) Community honored her.

== Personal life ==
She has 3 children. One is hearing and two are deaf.
