= Lauren Barnholdt =

American author

- Occupation: Writer
- Writing career
- Genres: Children's, Tween, Young Adult

Lauren Barnholdt is an American author of over 30 books including novels for children, adolescents, and young adults, as well as guides for authors.

== Critical reception ==
Several of her works have been reviewed by The Horn Book Magazine and Kliatt Magazine.

== Bibliography ==
=== At The Party ===
1. Telling Secrets (2010)
2. Falling Hard (2011)
3. Getting Close (2011)
4. Kissing Perfect (2011)

=== Devon Delaney ===
- The Secret Identity of Devon Delaney (2007)
- Devon Delaney Should Totally Know Better (2009)

=== Girl Meets Ghost ===
1. Girl Meets Ghost (2013)
2. The Harder the Fall (2013)
3. Ghost of a Chance (2014)

=== Haley Twitch ===
1. Hailey Twitch Is Not a Snitch (2010, illustrated by Suzanne Beaky)
2. Hailey Twitch and the Great Teacher Switch (2010)
3. Hailey Twitch and the Campground Itch (2011)
4. Hailey Twitch and the Wedding Glitch (2011)

=== Moment of Truth ===
1. Heat of the Moment (2015)
2. One Moment in Time (2015)
3. From This Moment (2015)

=== The Witches of Santa Anna ===
1. Claimed
2. Tricked
3. Rumored
4. Hushed
5. Pursued
6. Enticed
7. Ruined
8. Denial
9. Suspicion
10. Isolation
11. Paranoia
12. Fear
13. Oblivion
14. Forgotten
15. Broken
16. Stolen
17. Taken
18. Risen
19. Given

=== Stand-alone works ===
- Reality Chick (2006)
- Two-Way Street (2007)
- Four Truths and a Lie (2008)
- One Night That Changes Everything (2010)
- Aces Up (2010)
- Rules for Secret Keeping (2010)
- Taste (2011, with Aaron Gorvine)
- Sometimes It Happens (2011)
- Fake Me a Match (2011)
- The Thing About the Truth (2012)
- Love of the Party (2012)
- Right of Way (2013)
- Through to You (2014)

=== Non-fiction ===
- Writing & Selling the Young Adult Novel (2006, with Nadia Cornier)
- Fab Girls Guide to Sticky Situations (2007)

== See also ==
- Chick lit
- Lauren Henderson
- Kieran Scott
