= Lauren Holmes =

American writer

- Occupations: Author, writer
- Writing career
- Notable works: Barbara the Slut and Other People (2015)

Lauren Holmes is an American author and writer of short stories. She published her first collection of short stories, Barbara the Slut and Other People, in 2015.

== Life ==
Holmes was raised in the Hudson Valley in New York. She attended Wellesley College as an undergraduate, and received her MFA from Hunter College. Her work has appeared in Granta.

== Work ==
Holmes cites Tracy Kidder, Barbara Demick, and Adrian Nicole LeBlanc as influences. She began work on the collection in 2009. The work received mixed reviews.
