= Lauran =

Lauran is a feminine given name. Notable people with the name include:

- Lauran Bethell, American Baptist missionary
- Lauran Paine (1916–2001), American writer
- Lauran Glover, US Military History, first female Commander of the US Army Drill Team

== See also ==
- Laura (given name)
