= Lauren Hogg =

American author and activist (born 2003)

- Born: Lauren Elizabeth Hogg; June 10, 2003 (age 23)
- Education: Marjory Stoneman Douglas High School; Georgetown Day School; Georgetown University
- Years active: 2018–present
- Organizations: Never Again MSD; March for Our Lives
- Relatives: David Hogg (brother)

Lauren Elizabeth Hogg (born June 10, 2003) is an American activist against gun violence, author and app developer. She survived the Stoneman Douglas High School shooting in 2018 and after became a co-founder of March for Our Lives and advocates against gun violence. She is the younger sister of gun control activist and former Marjory Stoneman Douglas student David Hogg, who also survived the shooting.

== Early life and education ==
Hogg was born on June 10, 2003, and is the daughter of Kevin Hogg, a former Federal Bureau of Investigation agent, and Rebecca Boldrick, born in San Diego County, California and a teacher for Broward County Public Schools in Broward County, Florida. Hogg and her family moved to Washington, D.C. after the shooting, where she attended Georgetown Day School, graduating in 2021. She has stated that D.C. is her refuge.

She began studying at Georgetown University in the fall of 2021 and graduated in May 2025.

== Stoneman Douglas High School shooting ==
On February 14, 2018, Hogg was a freshman at Marjory Stoneman Douglas High School when a 19-year-old former student of the school entered the campus and started shooting with a semi-automatic rifle. Hogg was in a television production class when the shooting started; the fire alarm was activated and she believed it was possibly a prank because they had a fire alarm drill earlier in the day. When Hogg and other students were in the stairwell after evacuating due to the alarm, she realized that it was not a prank after she saw students running out of the building. She went back to her classroom and unlocked a closet in the room and hid with other students. Hogg reunited with her brother and father later that day. Her friends Jaime Guttenberg, Alaina Petty, Alyssa Alhadeff, and Gina Montalto were killed in the shooting.

== Gun control advocacy ==
After the shooting, Hogg became an activist against gun rights in the United States and became a co-founder of the March for Our Lives protests. She co-authored a book with her brother, David Hogg, called #NeverAgain: A New Generation Draws the Line published by Random House.

Hogg testified as a witness before the United States House Homeland Security Subcommittee on Emergency Preparedness, Response and Recovery in September 2019, following new legislation in the United States Senate that addressed school safety. Before the hearing, she spoke at a rally against gun rights alongside House Speaker Nancy Pelosi and Senate Minority Leader Chuck Schumer. Speaking to members of the subcommittee, Hogg said, "I think if we did enough, I wouldn't be here. I wouldn't have lost my friends." She also told members that lawmakers need to take steps including hiring mental health professionals to provide grief counseling to students and provide security in schools, in opposition to Governor of Florida Ron DeSantis signing a bill into law allowing public school districts to arm teachers.

In 2019 Hogg wrote Activist, a graphic novel.

== Political views ==
Hogg describes herself as liberal and supports raising the purchase age of firearms from 18 to 21, because the shooter of the Stoneman Douglas High School shooting was 19 years old and purchased the gun legally.

== App develop ==
Hogg created an app, Spinback, a music logging rating app on concerts, festivals, and live music and is available on App Store.

== Bibliography ==
- with Hogg, David (2018). #NeverAgain: A New Generation Draws the Line. Random House. ISBN 978-1-9848-0187-6.
- Hogg, Lauren (2019). Activist: A Story of the Marjory Stoneman Douglas Shooting. Simon and Schuster. ISBN 9781947378230.
