= Lauren (perfume) =

Ralph Lauren fragrance

Fragrance by Ralph Lauren
- Released: 1978
- Label: Ralph Lauren
- Website: http://www.ralphlauren.com/

Lauren is a perfume made by Ralph Lauren in 1978. The perfume is manufactured by L'Oreal.

== History ==
This is a feminine and gracious floral bouquet with green top notes and powdery base of wood and spices. The heart contains the classic trio of rose, carnation and violet. The fragrance also contains wild marigold, rosewood, pineapple, rose with cedarwood, vetiver and carnation.
