= Lauren Strawn =

American singer-songwriter

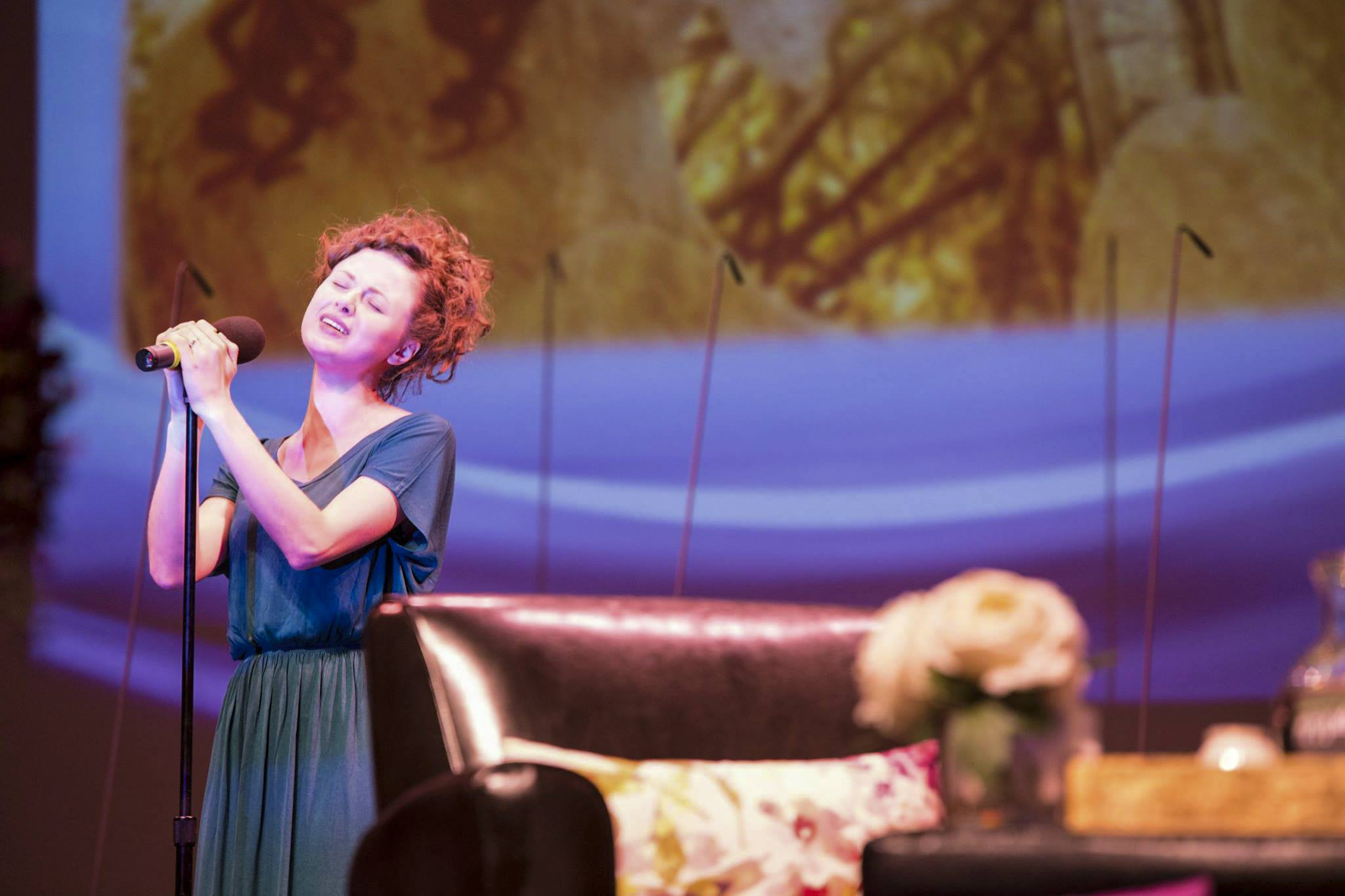
- Singer-songwriter Lauren Strawn performing live at Tami Rose's My Hope Is In God 2015

Background information
- Also known as: Lauren Strawn Mayo
- Born: Lauren Elisabeth Strawn; September 22, 1992 (age 33); Knoxville, Tennessee, US
- Origin: Rome, Georgia, US
- Genres: Christian/Gospel (previous), Singer/Songwriter, Indie Pop
- Occupation: Singer/Songwriter
- Instruments: Vocals, piano, synthesizer, ocarina, midi programming
- Years active: 2011–present
- Labels: NONE
- Website: www.facebook.com/LaurenStrawnMusic/

Lauren Elisabeth Strawn (born September 22, 1992) is an American singer-songwriter, recognized in her hometown of Watkinsville, Georgia for winning $21,000 (including $10,000 to a charity of her choice) and a three-track demo with the annual opening act contest by Christian Atlanta radio station, 104.7 the Fish, where she opened for Christian pop rock band, the Newsboys in September 2011.

== Biography ==
Strawn's music style is drawn from genres like punk rock, alternative, indie pop, cinematic, EDM, and J-Rock.

She began playing the piano at the age of three. By age eight, she began singing. Strawn took classical piano lessons for a brief period, but her passion for the instrument didn't form until the age of twelve, playing by ear.

By the age of sixteen, Strawn began songwriting, which led to her song " Like A Fire" (to which she wrote the melody, lyrics, chords, and arrangement) to be recorded by the First Apostolic Church of Maryville.

In 2014, Strawn released her first Christian single, "Reflect You," recorded at David Huff Studios, and began her career as a professional session musician and midi programmer.

In 2017, she began recording music in her home in Rome, Georgia. She joined country Singer/Songwriter, TJ Cochran, in 2018 as a band pianist and began touring with the band in 2019.

On January 18, 2019, Strawn released her first Singer/Songwriter single recorded at her home studio, " Amnesiac Brain."

Other projects in which Strawn has contributed to include Jack Lawson's album From the Ashes, the Shara McKee album Testimony and "Sinking Ship", an original song by Strawn, released by Tami Rose in 2015.
