= Lauren Murdoch =

Australian head chef

Lauren Murdoch is an Australian head chef.

== Early life ==
Murdoch grew up in Coffs Harbour, New South Wales and moved to Sydney as a teenager. She was raised by her father, and initially started training as a nurse before deciding to try a career in food.

== Career ==
Murdoch began her career in food at Atlas Bistro, and then moved to Rockpool to learn the art of pastry. Her next position was at the Concourse Restaurant at the Sydney Opera House, where she met chef Janni Kyritsis. In 1997, she joined Kyritsis in his new restaurant, MG Garage, as sous chef. In 2005, she became head chef at Lotus in Potts Point, followed by a position as head chef at Ash St. Cellar. In 2010, she launched a new French restaurant for the Merivale Group, Felix Bar and Bistro, also in Sydney. She left the position in 2012, saying that she wanted to work with friends on a casual basis. She took a six-month break, then went on to a position as head chef at The Restaurant at 3 Weeds in Rozelle. In 2015, she was appointed head chef ar Portside Sydney Opera House, a restaurant located on the western broadwalk.

Felix Bar and Bistro was awarded a Sydney Morning Herald Good Food Guide Chef's Hat and was placed in The Australian’s Hot 50 Restaurants list. Murdoch herself has received a number of Chef's Hat Awards in her career.

=== Media roles ===
Murdoch has appeared on MasterChef Australia, and the Lifestyle Channel’s Chef’s Christmas series. She has a regular slot on ABC Radio Sydney.

=== Other activities ===
Murdoch is an ambassador for Oz Harvest, a food charity, and coordinates the “Young Chefs' Dinner” for Sydney Morning Herald's Good Food Month.
