= Lauren Ezersky =

American fashion journalist and television host (born 1955)

- Born: 1955 (age 70–71); Yonkers, New York, U.S.
- Occupations: Fashion journalist; Television host
- Years active: 1984–present
- Known for: Behind the Velvet Ropes

Lauren Ezersky (born 1955) is an American fashion journalist and former television host. She is best known as the host of Behind the Velvet Ropes, a fashion-focused cable television series that aired from the mid-1980s to 2012. The show became known for its candid interviews and Ezersky's eccentric personal style.

== Early life ==
Ezersky was born and raised in Yonkers, New York. She attended Northeastern University in Boston, and briefly lived in the area, applying for jobs in fashion retail before returning to New York City to pursue a career in fashion media.

== Career ==
Ezersky began her career in the fashion industry working in showrooms and as a receptionist in New York's Garment District. She later worked as a saleswoman, buyer, and personal shopper.

In 1984, Ezersky made her television debut on The Oprah Winfrey Show in a segment about shopping habits. She later joined the television series Behind the Velvet Ropes, becoming its host and executive producer in the early 1990s.

She also made appearances on Good Morning America, Inside Edition, and The Oprah Winfrey Show. Beginning in the early 1990s, she wrote a column for Paper magazine titled "Lunch with Lauren", landing the gig after persistently pitching editor Kim Hastreiter.

== Personal life ==
Ezersky is known for her dramatic and idiosyncratic fashion sense, which often includes black clothing, bold accessories, and a streak of silver in her hair, leading to comparisons with the fictional character Cruella de Vil. Her eclectic style earned her a spot on Manhattan File magazine's Best Dressed list.

Ezersky's first husband, whom she married in 1988, was a man she described as a "computer nerd". She married graphic designer Craig Page in December 2002. She later married writer Warren Schultz, followed by a marriage to Nelson Happy. Ezersky adopted two chihuahuas, Tallulah Consuela and Gomez.
