= Lauren Whittington =

American journalist

Lauren W. Whittington is an American journalist who serves as politics editor for Roll Call newspaper. She was promoted to that position in 2009; prior to that, she worked as a political reporter at the same publication.

== Career ==
In 2005, Whittington was named one of "Pennsylvania's Most Influential Reporters" by the Pennsylvania political news website PoliticsPA. She has appeared as a guest on C-SPAN "Newsmakers" program.
