= Lauren Kern =

American journalist and magazine editor

Lauren Kern is an American journalist and magazine editor. She is the current editor-in-chief of Apple News and the executive editor of New York magazine. Previously, she was the editorial director at New York from 2004 to 2010 and deputy editor of The New York Times Magazine from 2010 to 2014.

As executive director at New York, Kern supervised the magazine's cover story on women who alleged sexual assault by Bill Cosby and its story on sexual harassment allegations against Roger Ailes.

Kern joined Apple in 2017, becoming the first editor-in-chief of Apple News, where she leads a team of around 30 journalists who curate the app's leading stories and feature stories.
