= Lauren Wise =

American epidemiologist

Dr. Lauren Wise
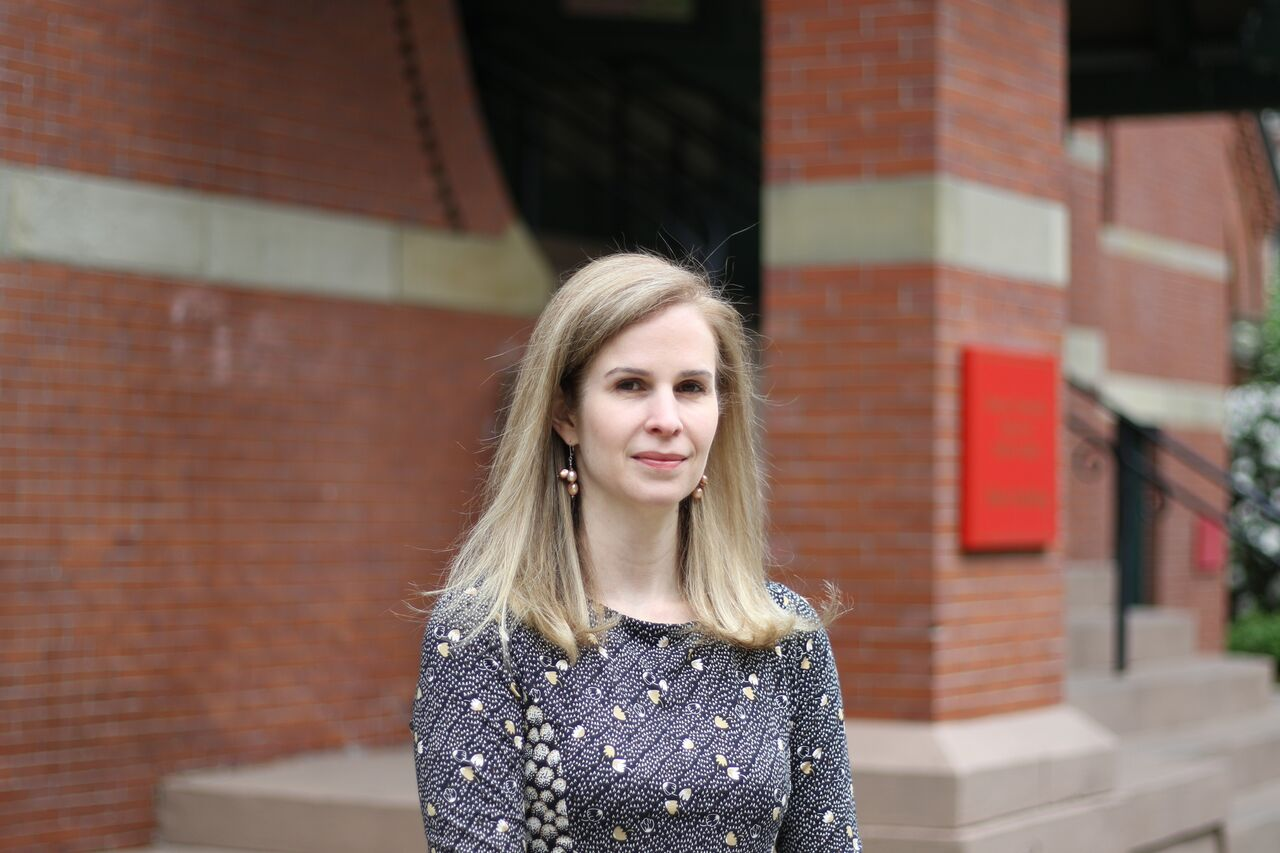
- Education: Bowdoin College; Harvard T.H. Chan School of Public Health
- Awards: ASPPH Early Career Research Award; 2020 Saward-Berg Award; 2020 BUSPH Faculty Award for Excellence in Research; 2022 Weiss-Koepsell Education Award; AJE and SER Article of the Year
- Scientific career
- Fields: Epidemiology; Women's Health
- Workplaces: Boston University School of Public Health
- Thesis: (2004)

Lauren Anne Wise is a Canadian-American epidemiologist and Professor in the Department of Epidemiology at the Boston University School of Public Health.

== Education ==
Lauren Wise completed a Bachelor of Arts magna cum laude at Bowdoin College with a double major in biochemistry and women's studies in 1996. She earned a Master of Science with a concentration in reproductive epidemiology from Harvard T.H. Chan School of Public Health in 2000. She completed a Doctor of Science in epidemiology with a minor in biostatistics from Harvard T.H. Chan School of Public Health in 2004. Her dissertation examined reproductive and hormonal risk factors for uterine fibroids in the Black Women's Health Study.

== Career ==
Lauren Wise is a reproductive and perinatal epidemiologist by training. She has been on faculty at the Boston University School of Public Health (BUSPH) since 2004. In 2015, she was promoted to Professor in the Department of Epidemiology at BUSPH. Her research involves the study of environmental and genetic determinants of benign gynecologic disorders, subfertility, and adverse pregnancy outcomes. She is Principal Investigator of Pregnancy Study Online (PRESTO), a NICHD-funded North American preconception cohort study of nearly 24,000 females and 5,500 of their male partners in which recruitment and follow-up occur via the internet (http://presto.bu.edu). She received NICHD and NIEHS funding to continue this research. She is also Principal Investigator of NIEHS-funded studies of uterine leiomyomata (fibroids) in the Study of Environment, Lifestyle and Fibroids (SELF), a prospective cohort study of 1,693 young African American women from Detroit, Michigan. In addition, she has contributed to the Black Women's Health Study which includes more than 59,000 African American women and investigates health conditions disproportionately affecting Black women.

She serves on the editorial boards of Human Reproduction, the American Journal of Epidemiology, and Perinatal and Pediatric Epidemiology. In 2021, she was President of the Society for Pediatric and Perinatal Epidemiologic Research (SPER).

Wise received the Association of Schools and Programs of Public Health (ASPPH) Early Career Public Health Research Award in 2011. She earned the American Journal of Epidemiology and the Society for Epidemiologic Research's Article of the Year award in 2013 and 2020. In 2020, she received the Faculty Award for Excellence in Research and Scholarship from Boston University School of Public Health.https://www.bu.edu/sph/announcement/student-staff-and-faculty-awards-2020/ She was recipient of the 2022 Weiss-Koepsell Excellence in Education Award of the Society for Epidemiologic Research (sponsored by the University of Washington).

== NIH Grants ==
Wise has obtained research grants as Principal Investigator from the National Institutes of Health (NIH), including: https://reporter.nih.gov/search/OZmJABmeRkWRFgenz8oxzA/projects?shared=true

== Publications ==
Wise has published more than 415 peer-reviewed journal articles. Her most cited first-authored papers include:

- Wise LA, JR Palmer, BL Harlow, D Spiegelman, EA Stewart, et al. Reproductive factors, hormonal contraception, and risk of uterine leiomyomata in African-American women: a prospective study. American journal of epidemiology 159 (2), 113–123, 2004.
- Wise LA, S Zierler, N Krieger, BL Harlow. Adult onset of major depressive disorder in relation to early life violent victimisation: a case-control study. The Lancet 358 (9285), 881–887, 2001.
- Wise LA, KJ Rothman, EM Mikkelsen, HT Sørensen, A Riis, EE Hatch. An internet-based prospective study of body size and time-to-pregnancy. Human reproduction 25 (1), 253–264, 2009.
