= Lorena =

Lorena may refer to:

== People and fictional characters ==
- Lorena (name), including a list of people and fictional characters with the given name
- Liza Lorena (born 1949), Filipino actress
- Lorena (footballer), Brazilian footballer
- Lorena Gómez (singer) (born 1986), Spanish singer and actress
- Lorena Bućan (born 2002), also known as simply Lorena, Croatian singer

== In arts and entertainment ==
- Lorena (album), a 2007 album by Spanish singer Lorena
- "Lorena" (song), an 1856 song by Joseph Phillbrick Webster
- Lorena (telenovela), a Colombian soap opera
- Lorena (TV series), a 2019 documentary series about John and Lorena Bobbitt

== Places ==
=== United States ===
- Lorena, Kansas, an unincorporated community
- Lorena, Texas, a city
- Masonic, California, alternately called Lorena, a ghost town

=== Elsewhere ===
- Lorena, São Paulo, a municipality in Brazil
  - Roman Catholic Diocese of Lorena,
- Lorena, the Italian exonym for the French region of Lorraine

== Other uses ==
- List of storms named Lorena
- Lorena (bus company), an Indonesian bus company
- Lorena High School, Lorena, Texas
- Lorena adobe stove, a type of cook stove
- Lorena, a beetle genus in the tribe Apostasimerini

== See also ==
- Ana Maria de Lorena, 1st Duchess of Abrantes (1691–1761), Portuguese noblewoman and courtier
- Maria Margarida de Lorena, 2nd Duchess of Abrantes (1713–1780), daughter of the 1st duchess
- Loreena, a given name
- Lorraine
- Loren (disambiguation)
