= Lauren Kalman =

American contemporary visual artist

Lauren Kalman (born 1980) is a contemporary American visual artist who uses photography, sculpture, jewelry, craft objects, performance, and installation. Kalman's works investigate ideas of beauty, body image, and consumer culture. Kalman has taught at institutions including Brown University and the Rhode Island School of Design. Currently she is an associate professor at Wayne State University.

== Early life and education ==
Kalman was born and raised in the Midwest. Her father is an industrial designer and her mother was a commercial photographer who have no doubt influenced Kalman's approach to her art. Kalman attended the Massachusetts College of Art where she majored in jewelry and metalsmithing. After, she apprenticed at the Johnson Atelier Technical Institute of Sculpture where she was trained in foundry with a focus on metal chasing and welding. Later, Kalman earned a MFA in art and technology from Ohio State University where she focused on art and technology which is obviously integrated in her interdisciplinary work. Kalman currently teaches at Wayne State University and works in her studio in Detroit, MI.

== Exhibitions ==
- 2019 Devices for Filling a Void (solo). Kipp Gallery, Indiana University of Pennsylvania, Indiana, PA
- 2019 Connections. Renwick Gallery, Smithsonian American Art Museum. Washington, DC
- 2019 Devices for Filling a Void (solo). McMaster Gallery University of South Carolina, Columbia, SC
- 2019 Striking Gold. Fuller Craft Museum, Brockton, MA
- 2018 Icons of the Flesh (solo). Baltimore Jewelry Center, Baltimore, MD
- 2017 But if Crime is Beautiful... (solo). Artspace, Raleigh, NC
- 2016 But if Crime is Beautiful... (solo). Museum of Arts and Design, New York, NY
- 2016 Pierce, Mark, Morph. Patricia and Phillip Frost Art Museum, Miami, FL
- 2016 A (Mis)Perceived Physique: Bodyscapes by Three Women Artists. Target Gallery, Torpedo Factory Art Center, Alexandria, VA
- 2014 Coveted Objects (solo). Cranbrook Museum of Art, Bloomfield Hills, MI
- 2014 PostGlamism: Glam Art in the 21st Century. Center on Contemporary Art, Seattle, WA
- 2013 Out of the Box: Trends in Contemporary Jewelry, Virginia Museum of Contemporary Art. Virginia Beach, VA
- 2012-13 40 Under 40: Craft Futures. Renwick Gallery, Smithsonian American Art Museum. Washington, DC
- 2012 Tributaries (solo). Metal Museum, Memphis, TN
- 2012 Man Up! No Balls About it. Duderstadt Center, The University of Michigan. Ann Arbor, MI
- 2009 Elusive Matter. Museum of Contemporary Craft, Portland, OR

== Works ==
=== But if the Crime is Beautiful.... (2013-2015) ===
But if the Crime is Beautiful… is a series found objects and fabric adorning a woman's body to create sculptural compositions, which were photographed and displayed along with the objects themselves. The series is named after Adolf Loos' 1910 lecture series Ornament and Crime, in which he equated ornamentation with the destruction of culture and society, and argued that only criminals and degenerates (including women) adorn themselves. Adolf Loos' writings were highly influential in the Modern Architecture movement and the Bauhaus. In But if the Crime is Beautiful… Kalman points out and challenges these historical discourses, which have simultaneously served to paint the female sexuality as deviant, within the field of modernism. But if the Crime is Beautiful... was exhibited in the Sienna Patti Gallery in Lennox, MA from February 8 through April 6, 2014.

== Collections ==
Kalman's work is in the collections of the Museum of Fine Arts, Boston, the Detroit Institute of Art, and The Renwick Gallery of the Smithsonian American Art Museum, amongst others.
