= Mykie =

American YouTuber and make-up artist

- Born: Lauren Mychal Mountain; November 1, 1989 (age 37); Philadelphia, Pennsylvania, U.S.
- Other names: Glam&Gore
- Occupations: Makeup artist; YouTuber

YouTube information
- Channel: Mykie
- Years active: 2014–present
- Genre: Beauty
- Subscribers: 3.83 million
- Views: 562 million
- Last updated: April 7, 2025

Mykie (born Lauren Mychal Mountain on November 1, 1989 in Pennsylvania) is a makeup artist and YouTuber. On her YouTube channel "Glam&Gore" she posts beauty and special effects makeup tutorials along with challenges, stories, and ghost-hunting expeditions. She was named Beauty Vlogger of the Year at the 4th Annual NYX Cosmetics Face Awards in 2015.

== Early life ==
Lauren Mychal “Mykie” was born and raised in Philadelphia, Pennsylvania. She got her start into special FX makeup by working as part of the cast in a haunted house. She moved to Los Angeles after graduating from Temple University's film program to work on movie sets.

== Career ==
=== YouTube ===
Mykie started her YouTube channel Glam&Gore in 2014, uploading her first video on April 15, 2014. Between freelance jobs, she posted her makeup and makeup tutorials online to build up a portfolio, through doing this she grew an audience, with 700,000 subscribers in the first year and a half.

One of her most popular videos was using drug store make up to transform herself into Squidward from SpongeBob SquarePants. The difficulty for this challenge was to find cheap items that would help one achieve Squidward's head shape.

==== Viral marketing ====
In the lead up to the release of the film Suicide Squad, promotional photographs of the characters were released and the tattooed Jared Leto as the Joker raised questions as to where the tattoos had come from. Mykie and Chase Langley created and released photographs of the character Harley Quinn tattooing the Joker with Mykie portraying Harley Quinn in the photographs. Several media outlets picked up the photograph, speculating whether the picture was authentic. Mykie later revealed that the photo was fanart in the video "Harley Quinn Makeup Tutorial from the new Suicide Squad movie & Joker Fan Art".

In March 2017 Mykie made a tutorial for a look inspired from the Death Stranding video game. The look was so realistic that when an image from the tutorial was released before the full video tutorial was uploaded, it was believed to be a leaked image of actress Emma Stone joining the all-male cast of Death Stranding. In the comments of the tutorial Mykie responded to the speculation about the blurry picture "We didn't call it Emma Stone or a leak, other[s] did and we didn't add any context, but yes that's a picture from this shoot."

=== NYX FACE Awards ===
Mykie was named Beauty Vlogger of the Year at the 2015 NYX FACE Awards, more than 2 million votes were cast throughout the competition and 3,000 original entries were made before 30 semifinalists were selected. Each of the semifinalists created looks inspired by three challenge themes and the top 6 finalists were chosen through rounds of public voting.

== Controversies ==
In June 2016 the photo messaging application Snapchat appeared to be copying several artist's work, including a make-up look that Mykie had created a year earlier, and using them in Snapchat filters without credit. Following this Mykie became an advocate for other artists faced with similar problems, and attempted to work with Snapchat to sort the issues out. Snapchat added additional layers of review for designs to avoid similar situations in the future.

In April 2017 Mykie uploaded a makeup tutorial titled "Re-Accommodated Makeup Tutorial - Inspired by United Airlines", outlining how to achieve a bruised and bloodied look similar to the appearance of the doctor who was dragged from the flight during the United Express Flight 3411 incident. It received backlash on social media. The video, according to Mykie in a subsequent statement, was designed as a satire against United Airlines in the aftermath of the incident; according to Cosmopolitan, "Some social media users had a difficult time judging whether or not the video was satire."

== Personal life ==
From 2019 to 2024 Mykie was in a relationship with fellow youtuber Anthony Padilla.
