= Design Prize Switzerland =

Design Preis Schweiz
- Native name: Prix Design Suisse / Design Prize Switzerland
- Description: Swiss award in the field of design
- Country: Switzerland

Design Preis Schweiz (DPS), also known as Prix Design Suisse and Design Prize Switzerland, is a Swiss award in the field of design that is presented every two years.

== History and development ==
The Design Prize Switzerland has been announced and awarded since 1991. In its early years, the association was organizationally affiliated with its founding main initiator, Design Center Langenthal AG. In 2018, Michel Hueter, Raphael Rossel, and Urs Stampfli assumed sponsorship independently from this previous affiliation. Since 2022, Benjamin Moser, Debora Biffi, and Thomas Walliser have continued to run the Design Prize Switzerland.

The award is supported by the Swiss design sector through institutions such as foundations, universities, economic affairs departments of various cantons, and a range of industry partners. The sponsoring body of the Design Prize Switzerland is a non-profit association of the same name. The Design Prize Switzerland recognizes objects and projects that are already on the market or close to market readiness.

In 2023, the total prize money amounted to 50,000 Swiss francs.

== Partners ==
Among the partner organizations are, among others, ETH Zurich, the public-law foundation Pro Helvetia, the Swiss Textile College, and the Zurich University of the Arts.

== Impact ==
According to the Neue Zürcher Zeitung, the prize has established itself as an independent institution, and is considered one of the most important awards for good design. The international journal series for architecture and architectural theory highlight that for over 30 years, the Design Prize Switzerland has recognized outstanding achievements in the Swiss design industry. On a biennial basis, an independent jury discusses and evaluates the latest developments in the Swiss design scene.

Hella Schindel, editor at TEC21, notes that the biennial call for entries provides a platform for discourse on the evolving concept of design. The Berner Zeitung commends the prize for honoring outstanding achievements in Swiss design every two years. BauNetz likewise reports that the Design Prize Switzerland has been recognizing excellence in the Swiss design industry for over 30 years.

For the Luzerner Zeitung, the Design Prize Switzerland is one of the two major design awards in Switzerland.

== Weblinks ==
- Website of designpreis.ch
- Broadcast for Radio: Design Preis Schweiz: Sein oder nicht Design? at Schweizer Radio und Fernsehen
