= Lauren Cobello =

American author, PR Agency Owner, and Television Personality

- Born: United States
- Education: B.S.
- Alma mater: State University of New York at Oswego
- Occupations: Author, Founder and CEO Leverage with Media PR
- Children: 4
- Writing career
- Language: English
- Genres: Non-fiction
- Subject: Personal finance
- Website: Official Website

Lauren Cobello (formerly Lauren Greutman) is the Founder and CEO of Leverage with Media PR. She is also a former american consumer savings expert, author, speaker, and lifestyle television personality.

== Early life and education ==
Cobello was born in Saratoga Springs, New York. From 1999 to 2003 she attended the State University of New York at Oswego, where she received her Bachelor of Science.

== Career ==
In 2010, Lauren founded I am THAT Lady, later renamed LaurenCobello.com, to offer advice and guidance to women who found themselves in debt. By 2012 she was debt free. In 2014, Cobello began distributing meal plans to feed a family for a month for around $150.

Through her website she become a 3x author and National TV personality and spent 15 years appearing on nationally syndicated shows including The Today Show, ABC News, and NBC News.

She has appeared as the cover stories in Syracuse Magazine and Oswego County Business News Magazine, and has been interviewed by BBC, U.S. News & World Report, and Forbes.

Cobello published her first book, How to Coupon Effectively in 2013. Her third book The Recovering Spender was published by Hachette Book Group in 2016.

== Bibliography ==
- The Recovering Spender (Hachette Book Group, 2016)
