= Lauren LoGiudice =

American comedian, actress, and writer (born 1983)

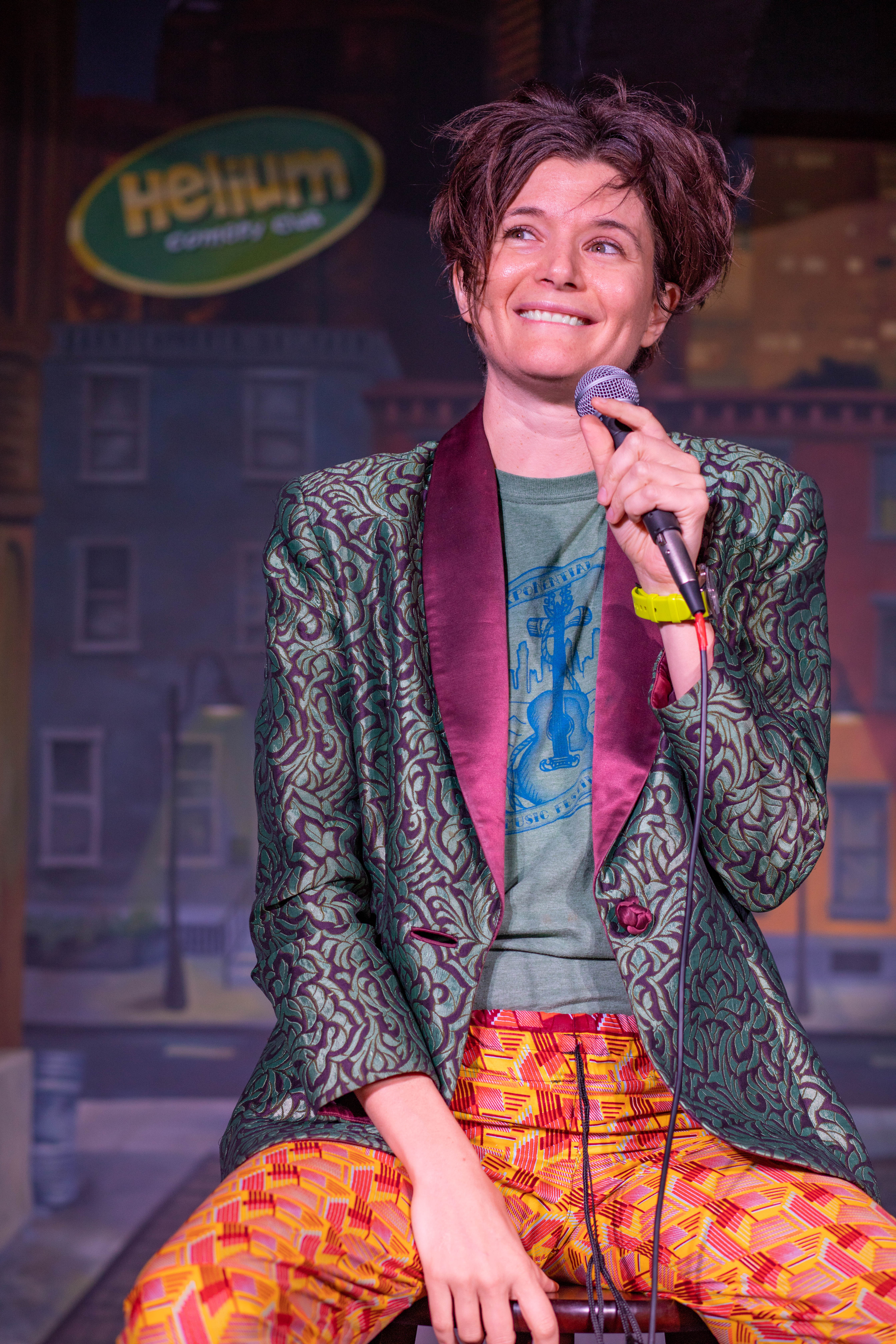
- Born: Lauren LoGiudice; June 14, 1983 (age 43); Queens, New York, U.S.
- Occupations: Comedian and Actor
- Years active: 2007–present

Lauren LoGiudice (born June 14, 1983) is an American comedian, actress, and writer. A Moth StorySLAM champ, she's been featured by The New York Times, BBC, among others. Reviews of a recent multi-character sketch comedy video project said, “You’ll see the influences from Sacha Baron Cohen and Tracey Ullman.”

== Early life and education ==
LoGiudice was born on June 14, 1983, and grew up in the Howard Beach section of Queens, New York. After graduating from Wesleyan University, LoGiudice obtained the American India Foundation William J. Clinton Fellowship Award for service in India. During her tenure in Bangalore, India, she worked with a non-profit organization that served victims of AIDS and studied Bharata Natyam.

After attending Lakme Fashion Week in Bombay, LoGiudice decided to pursue acting back in New York. When she returned, she studied at Michael Howard Studios and the T. Schreiber Conservatory, as well as privately with Lynn Singer and Scott Freeman.

Shortly after, LoGiudice met writer Sharyn Jackson and the two created the "Victoria" party. They continued to produce a yearly Golden Girls event, attended by Rue McClanahan's estate.

== Comedian ==
LoGiudice wrote “Queens Girl,” an autobiographical solo show. LoGiudice toured the play in New York, San Francisco, Portland and New Orleans. Stockholm Pride invited LoGiudice to perform Queens Girl in their cultural festival. The production was noted by Backstage.

LoGiudice formed a production company with Kelsy Chauvin called Over/Under Productions and produced three short films: Bridal Party (premiered at the Gotham Screen Film Festival), Yes and No, and Reality Check, as well as the web series Ciao Grandma.

LoGiudice then created her second solo play, Garbo Dreams, about Greta Garbo's life and last days. The site-specific piece played in NYC, including Stage Left Studio, Casa Belvedere and Galerie St. George. The Red Room performances with Michael Arenella were given mention in The New York Times.

LoGiudice worked with designer Britta Uschkamp and Amber Rima on a photographic exploration of Garbo's life and together they collaborated with Polly Dawson and Sol Tamargo of DelSol Photography for an experimental underwater photography project in Playa del Carmen, Mexico.

LoGiudice began making public appearances in the character of Greta Garbo, otherwise known as Ms. G, hosting the Top Corporate Allies for Diversity Gala in NYC.

Using the cynical, apathetic comedy of Garbo's persona, LoGiudice wrote several humorous pieces, one of which was published by McSweeney's.

LoGiudice debuted over 15 sketch comedy characters on her YouTube channel, including Principal Mary Poppins. She created an interactive web video project called “Yule Log with Friends.” It also showed at the High 5 Gallery. Reviews said, “While you watch the characters go about their lives you’ll see the influences from Sacha Baron Cohen and Tracey Ullman.”

Concurrent to the YouTube project, LoGiudice started doing standup comedy, later integrating a new character, a Melania Trump impression, into her routine. She performed standup in character as Melania Trump around NYC, including at Gotham Comedy Club. She also created an Instagram parody channel based on the First Lady's persona. Her impression was called, "A dark, soulful and very funny send-up of Melania Trump!"

Shortly thereafter she wrote a humor book Inside Melania: What I Know About Melania Trump by Impersonating Her. Ritch Shydner wrote that, "Lauren’s book returned me to the essential power and joy of good comedy." Joe Conklin of the WIP Morning Show called is “Clever and hilarious.” Bojan Požar, Slovenian Journalist, said that the book is, "A comical mirror of her [Melania Trump's] reality."

The 23-city book tour The Melania Trump Road Show: Get Out the Vote and Get Me Out of the White House of Garbage, satirical mix of standup comedy, sketches, videos co-created with standup comedian Jesse Sneddon, was canceled due to COVID-19. During the pandemic the duo was a weekly guest on WCGO's Playtime with Bill Turck and Kerri Kendall, as well as wrote and performed a two-hour radio show on the network and a virtual inauguration event in honor of President Joe Biden.

LoGiudice continues to perform standup comedy and is the host of the Misfit Variety Show, which she performs in NYC and on tour, as well as shows at the Capish?! Club: Misfit Comedy Space in Little Italy, NYC. These shows are critic's picks in Time Out NY, Gothamist, the New York Times, amongst other major outlets.

She is also the host of Misfits Makin' It: Oddballs Doing Cool Stuff on Radio Misfits Podcast Network.

== Actor ==
LoGiudice performed at several off-off-Broadway theaters including the Medicine Show Theatre. Her portrayal of the German philosopher Hannah Arendt was noted by The New York Times as “fierce” and “beautiful.”

LoGiudice has also worked as a performer in Italy, particularly in Rome.

LoGiudice was named in Go Magazine's "100 Women We Love." They said: "With all that ambition and focus to LoGiudice's natural beauty and talent and you've got a recipe for success. Just remember, you heard about her here first".

Under the tutelage of acting coach Lynn Singer, LoGiudice formally learned to speak without a New York accent. Sam Roberts included LoGiudice in The New York Times feature story about the process that was on the cover of the Sunday Metropolitan section. The corresponding video, created by Erik Olsen and featuring LoGiudice, was the number-one emailed video on NYTimes.com for a whole week. Consequently, the BBC covered LoGiudice's story.

LoGiudice was cast in the theatrically released feature film "When Harry Tries to Marry." LoGiudice earned accolades for her performance—the front page of the Queens Courier, as well as the Gazette called LoGiudice a “rising star."

LoGiudice was cast in numerous national and regional commercials, including Zappos' scandalous "More Than Just Shoes" campaign. She also appeared in Bittersweet Monday,; Beautiful Something, and Angel Studio's Brave the Dark with Jared Harris. LoGiudice was also cast as a co-star in the HBO show Veep opposite Julia Louis-Dreyfus and Hugh Laurie.

LoGiudice is a Moth StorySLAM champ.

== Charity Work ==
LoGiudice has endorsed several non-profit causes throughout her career. She hosted a photography exhibition by Javier Gomez, voted People Magazine's Sexiest Artist Alive, to benefit Strengthen Our Sisters, a grassroots, community base nonprofit serving homeless/battered women and children. LoGiudice has also supported United Cerebral Palsy.
