= Lauren Anne Baldwin =

British actress

Lauren Baldwin
- Born: Billinge Higher End, Wigan, England
- Occupation: Actress
- Years active: 1990–present

Lauren Baldwin is a British actress.

== Early life and career ==
Lauren Baldwin was born in Billinge Higher End, Wigan, England. She played the role of 'Annie' in web series 'Suck & Moan - Vampires vs Zombies' - an official selection at ITVFest (Independent Television Festival) 2010.

In October 2011, Lauren began shooting 'Finders Keepers' playing the lead role of All-American girl 'Gabbi'.

Baldwin's first big break came when she appeared in The Beatles music video "Free as a Bird" in 1996. Baldwin performed at the 2002 Edinburgh Festival Fringe in a Greek tragedy entitled Peace. In 2006 Lauren starred as 'Melissa' in the short film 'School Daze' which won Best Drama at the Royal Television Society Awards.

In 2013, Lauren booked her first major US network role as Betty in TNT drama Southland. She has since worked on hit shows such as Lucifer on FOX, Timeless on NBC, You're The Worst on FX and The Odd Couple for CBS. She played Gretchen in the Emma Watson and Tom Hanks-starring feature film The Circle, directed by James Ponsoldt.
