= Lauren Benton (activist) =

British activist

- Occupation: Activist

Lauren Benton is a British activist. She is the founder and chief executive officer of the charity BODY Charity. Benton is known for her weight loss as a result of Body Dysmorphic Disorder (BDD), an issue for which she founded the charity.

Founded in March 2011, BODY Charity is the UK's first charity to raise awareness of Body Dysmorphic Disorder.

Since being diagnosed herself with the disorder, Benton has raised the issue with public speaking and lectures.

Benton won an enterprising woman award in 2013.
