= Zineb Hattab =

Spanish chef

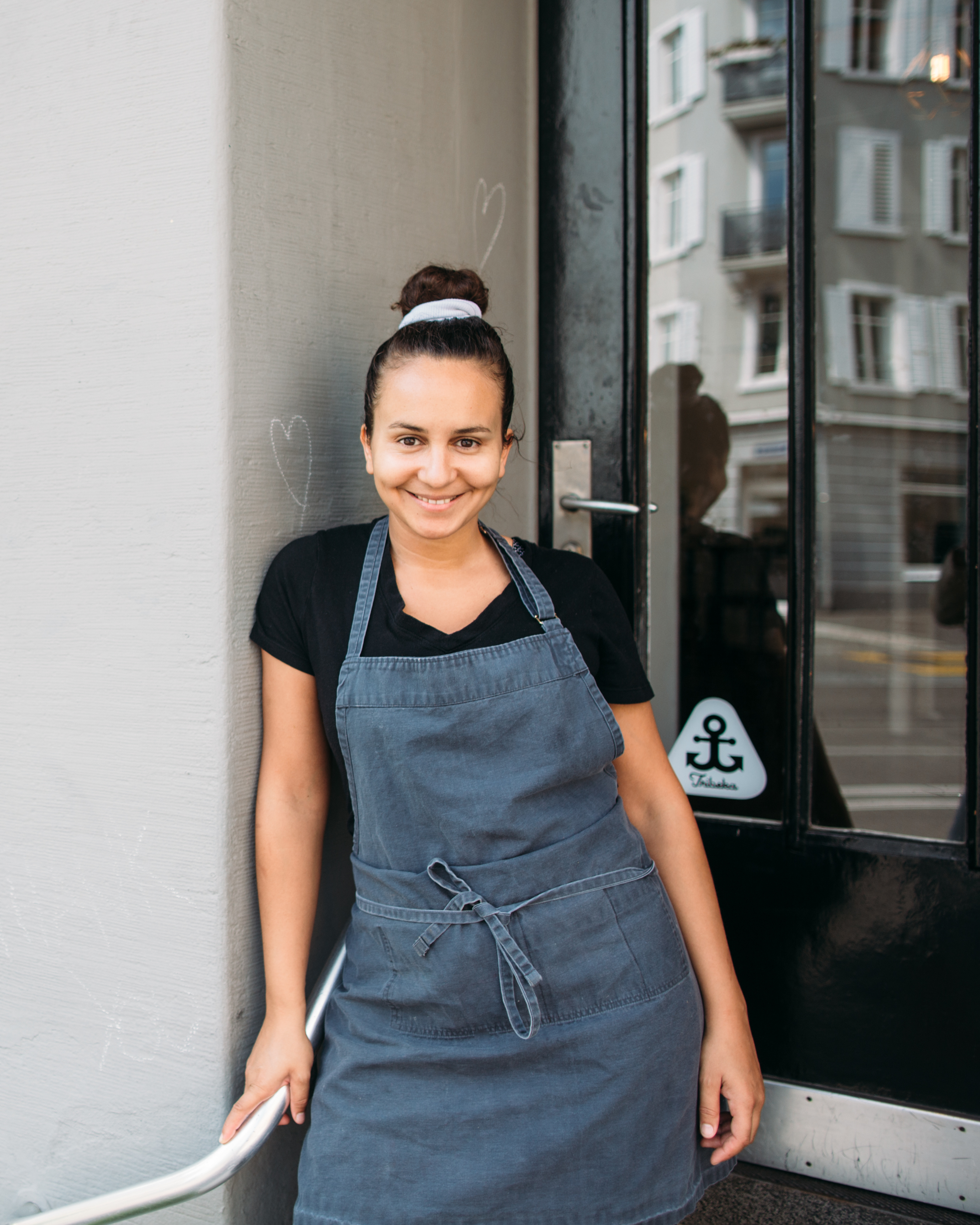
- Zineb Hattab at KLE's entrance
- Born: 23 July 1989 (age 36); Blanes, Spain
- Education: Industrial Engineer
- Culinary career
- Cooking style: Vegan Cuisine; Fine Dining
- Rating(s): Michelin Guide Green Star Gault Millau 15 points Michelin star
- Current restaurant(s): KLE DAR

Zineb Hattab, also known as Zizi Hattab, (born July 23, 1989) is a Moroccan-Spanish chef and the owner of plant-based restaurant KLE in Zurich, Switzerland. Hattab was selected “discovery of the year” by Gault Millau on her restaurant's opening year in 2020 and was the first vegan chef in Switzerland to be awarded with a green and a red Michelin star. Hattab's cooking is noted for its intense flavors and complex balanced dishes in a casual setup.

== Early life ==
Hattab was born in Girona, Spain, to immigrant parents from Morocco. They had moved to Costa Brava during the 1980s. She grew up in Blanes, a small town by the Mediterranean Sea.

In 2007, Hattab moved to Barcelona to study engineering. During her studies, she lived in a student dorm where she started cooking for her friends and family.

== Career ==
After moving to Switzerland in 2012, Hattab worked for two years as a software developer in an engineering firm. In 2014 at the age of 24, she decided to leave her corporate life and began a new career as a cook. She worked at Osteria Francescana by Massimo Bottura, Nerua by Josean Alija and El Celler de Can Roca by the Roca brothers. She also worked for Andreas Caminada at Schloss Schauenstein.

In 2017, Hattab moved to New York, where she spent some time at Blue Hill and as an executive sous chef at Cosme for Enrique Olvera. After 2 years working in New York she moved back Switzerland to open her own restaurant.

In January 2020, Hattab opened KLE, a small restaurant in Zurich Wiedikon with fine cuisine and a completely vegan menu. Only a few weeks after opening, Gault&Millau awarded it with 14 points and named Hattab as “Chef of the Month”. During 2021 KLE was awarded with 15 Gault Millau points and became the first Swiss vegan restaurant awarded with a green and red Michelin star. In October 2022 KLE received a Michelin Star.

In October 2021, Hattab opened her second location DAR with a restaurant and a cocktail bar, followed by a third, Cor, a wine and pinchos bar which opened in April 2023.

== Acknowledgments ==
- 2020: Gault Millau, Discovery of the year
- 2020: Gault Millau, 14 points
- 2020: Gault Millau & American Express, Talents 2020
- 2021: Gault Millau, 15 points
- 2021: Michelin Guide, Green Star
- 2022: Michelin Guide, Michelin Star
