= Lauren Royal =

- Occupation: Novelist
- Writing career
- Language: English
- Genre: historical romance
- Website: www.laurenroyal.com

Lauren Royal is a New York Times and USA Today bestselling historical romance author. She's a self-proclaimed Angels baseball fan and Ducks hockey fan who lives in Southern California with her family and their constantly shedding cat. Her books are set primarily in England and Scotland in the 17th and 19th centuries (the Restoration and Regency periods).

In third grade, she decided that she wanted to become a writer after winning a "Why My Mother is the Greatest" essay contest and seeing her entry published in a major regional newspaper.

Royal began buying books about history, and she became fascinated with that topic as she became a teenager. Among the non-history writers she preferred were Ira Levin and Robert A. Heinlein. When Royal was fourteen, she took a book from her uncle's collection: the book, "Forever Amber," would make a difference in Royal's life, as she became a fan of restoration era romances.

Royal attended the University of California, Irvine, later on transferring to UCLA. She was able to get hands-on experience with professional writing there, as she majored in television and film production. After being told that it was too difficult for a novelist to get published, Royal opened a jewelry store, which she soon moved to a local mall.

For the next fourteen years, she was a dedicated businesswoman, helping her store expand into a chain of seven stores around Southern California. She married and had three children. However, as company owner, she spent many hours reading and writing, which allowed her to practice her writing skills. She wrote employee manuals, company newsletters, newspaper and radio ads, and pretty much anything else the company needed written.

Her small chain of stores was bought by a larger, national chain, and Royal decided to stay home and pursue her childhood dream of becoming a writer. In between watching her children and taking care of the house, she was able to finish her first book, "Amethyst" (in which the heroine was a jeweler—as Royal says, "write what you know!").

"Amethyst" was followed by "Emerald," "Amber," "Forevermore" (her contribution to the anthology published as "In Praise of Younger Men"), "Violet," "Lily," and "Rose," all of which are set in the Restoration era. Then she wrote "Lost in Temptation," "Tempting Juliana," and "The Art of Temptation," which are all set in the Regency era.

She is currently working on young-adult versions of her books with her daughter, Devon, as well as new YA books set in the Renaissance (Elizabethan) era (16th century).
