= Expert Review of Vaccines =

- Discipline: Vaccines Immunology
- Language: English
- Edited by: Andrew Pollard

Publication details
- History: 2002-present
- Publisher: Taylor & Francis
- Frequency: Monthly
- Impact factor: 5.5 (2023)

Standard abbreviations
- ISO 4: Expert Rev. Vaccines

Indexing
- ISSN: 1476-0584 (print); 1744-8395 (web)

Links
- Journal homepage; Online access; Online archive

Expert Review of Vaccines is a monthly peer-reviewed medical journal covering all aspects impacting the clinical effectiveness of vaccines. According to the Journal Citation Reports, the journal has a 2023 impact factor of 5.5.
