= Lawrence =

Lawrence may refer to:

== Education ==
=== Colleges and universities ===
- Lawrence Technological University, a university in Southfield, Michigan, United States
- Lawrence University, a liberal arts university in Appleton, Wisconsin, United States

=== Preparatory & high schools ===
- Lawrence Academy at Groton, a preparatory school in Groton, Massachusetts, United States
- Lawrence College, Ghora Gali, a high school in Pakistan
- Lawrence School, Lovedale, a high school in India
- The Lawrence School, Sanawar, a high school in India

=== Research laboratories ===
- Lawrence Berkeley National Laboratory, United States
- Lawrence Livermore National Laboratory, United States

== People ==
- Lawrence (given name), including a list of people with the name
- Lawrence (surname), including a list of people with the name
- Lawrence (band), an American soul-pop group
- Lawrence (judge royal) (died after 1180), Hungarian nobleman, Judge royal 1164–1172
- Lawrence (musician), Lawrence Hayward (born 1961), British musician
- Saint Lawrence (died 258), deacon and Roman Catholic saint, born in Spain
- Lawrence I (bishop of Milan), bishop of Milan from 490 to c. 511, Roman Catholic saint
- Lawrence (archbishop of Split) (died 1099), Benedictine monk and Archbishop of Split 1060–1099
- Brother Lawrence (died 1691), Carmelite friar

== Places ==
=== Australia ===
- Lawrence, New South Wales
- Lawrence Rocks, Victoria, Australia

=== United States ===
- Lawrence, Illinois
- Lawrence, Indiana
- Lawrence, Kansas
- Lawrenceburg, Kentucky, formerly known as Lawrence
- Lawrence, Massachusetts
- Lawrence, Michigan
- Lawrence, Minnesota
- Lawrence, Mississippi
- Lawrence, Nebraska
- Lawrence Brook, New Jersey
- Lawrence, Nassau County, New York, a village
- Lawrence, St. Lawrence County, New York, a town
- Lawrence, Pennsylvania
- Lawrence, Texas
- Lawrence, Utah
- Lawrence, Washington
- Lawrence, Brown County, Wisconsin, a town
- Lawrence, Marquette County, Wisconsin, an unincorporated community
- Lawrence, Rusk County, Wisconsin, a town
- Lawrence Township (disambiguation)

=== Other places ===
- Lawrence (electoral district), Ontario, Canada
- Lawrence Garden, Lahore, Punjab, Pakistan
- Lawrence Pond, a community in Conception Bay South, Newfoundland, Canada
- Lawrence, New Zealand

== Ships ==
- USS Lawrence (1813), a brig which acted as Commodore Oliver Perry's flagship
- USS Lawrence (1843), a brig decommissioned in 1846
- USS Lawrence (DD-8), a 400-ton Bainbridge-class destroyer commissioned in 1903 and serving until 1920
- USS Lawrence (DD-250), a Clemson-class destroyer, serving from 1921 to 1945
- USS Lawrence (DDG-4), a Charles F. Adams-class destroyer commissioned in 1962, and serving through 1994
- Lawrence (schooner), a schooner launched in 1756

== Transport ==
- Lawrence (Amtrak station), Lawrence, Kansas, U.S.
- Lawrence (Caltrain station) in Santa Clara, California, U.S.
- Lawrence (MBTA station) in Lawrence (near Boston), Massachusetts, U.S.
- Lawrence Avenue (Toronto) in Toronto, Ontario, Canada
  - Lawrence station (Toronto), a Lawrence Avenue subway station
  - Lawrence West station, a Lawrence Avenue subway station
  - Lawrence East station, a Lawrence Avenue subway station
- Lawrence Avenue (Chicago) in Chicago, Illinois, U.S.
  - Lawrence station (CTA), a rapid transit station in Chicago, Illinois, U.S.

== Other uses ==
- Lawrence (crater), a lunar impact crater
- The Lawrence, a newspaper founded 1881
- Lawrence v. Texas, a major Supreme Court of the United States decision

== See also ==
- Larry (disambiguation)
- Laurence, a given name and surname
- Laurens (disambiguation)
- Lawrance (disambiguation)
- Lawrence Academy (disambiguation)
- Lawrence County (disambiguation)
- Lawrence Station (disambiguation)
- Lawrence Township (disambiguation)
- Lawrie (name)
- Lawrenceburg (disambiguation)
- Lawrenceville (disambiguation)
- Saint Lawrence (disambiguation)
