= Lawrence Township, Minnesota =

Lawrence Township is the name of some places in the U.S. state of Minnesota:

- Lawrence Township, Grant County, Minnesota
- Lawrence Township, Itasca County, Minnesota

== See also ==
- Lawrence Township (disambiguation)
