= Maple Leaf Forever Guitars =

Canadian custom-made guitars

The Maple Leaf Forever Guitars are two guitars, one acoustic and one electric, made from the tree that inspired Alexander Muir to write "The Maple Leaf Forever". The guitars are kept in a trust and are loaned to a different musician each year.

== History ==
In 1867 Alexander Muir, a Scottish immigrant, lived on Laing Street in Toronto, Ontario. Following Canada's confederation, a large maple tree on his street inspired Muir to write "The Maple Leaf Forever". The song was used as Canada's unofficial national anthem.

In July 2013, a thunder storm destroyed the tree that inspired Muir's song. The fallen tree was initially going to become mulch, but due to public outcry its wood was saved and used for projects that would preserve its cultural importance to Canada. Significant objects made from the tree include the gavel for the Supreme Court of Canada and the speaker's podium for Toronto City Council. In 2014 Colin Cripps and Craig Scott came up with the idea of making guitars from the tree. Cripps also expressed desire for the guitars to be custodial, so that they would be passed from musician to musician instead of being owned by one person. After approval by City Council, David Fox was chosen to build the acoustic guitar while Tom Bartlett built the electric. The guitars were completed in September 2015.

== Custodians of the guitars ==
=== Acoustic ===
- 2016 – Colin Cripps of Blue Rodeo
- 2017 – Jason Barry

=== Electric ===
- 2016 – Paul Langlois of the Tragically Hip
- 2017 – Sam Roberts
- 2020 - Steve Sladkowski of PUP
- 2024 - Bill Bell of Tom Cochrane
- 2025 - Wade MacNeil of Alexisonfire
