= Lawrence Station =

Lawrence Station can refer to:

== Places ==
- Lawrence Station, New Brunswick, Canada
- Lawrence Station, New Jersey, USA

== Transportation ==
- Lawrence station (CTA), a Chicago "L" station
- Lawrence station (Kansas), an Amtrak station in Lawrence, Kansas, USA
- Lawrence station (Caltrain), a Caltrain station in Sunnyvale, California, USA
- Lawrence (LIRR station), a Long Island Rail Road station in Lawrence, New York, USA
- Lawrence station (Toronto), a subway station in Toronto, Ontario, Canada
- Lawrence East station, a subway station in Toronto, Ontario, Canada
- Lawrence West station, a subway station in Toronto, Ontario, Canada
- McGovern Transportation Center, formerly Lawrence station, a commuter rail station in Lawrence, Massachusetts

== Other uses ==
- Lawrence Experiment Station, an experimental sewage treatment facility in Lawrence, Massachusetts

== See also ==
- St Lawrence railway station (disambiguation)
- Lawrence (disambiguation)
- Lawrence Hill railway station
