= Bedford Park, Toronto =

Coordinates: 43.730°N 79.411°W

Bedford Park
- Neighbourhood
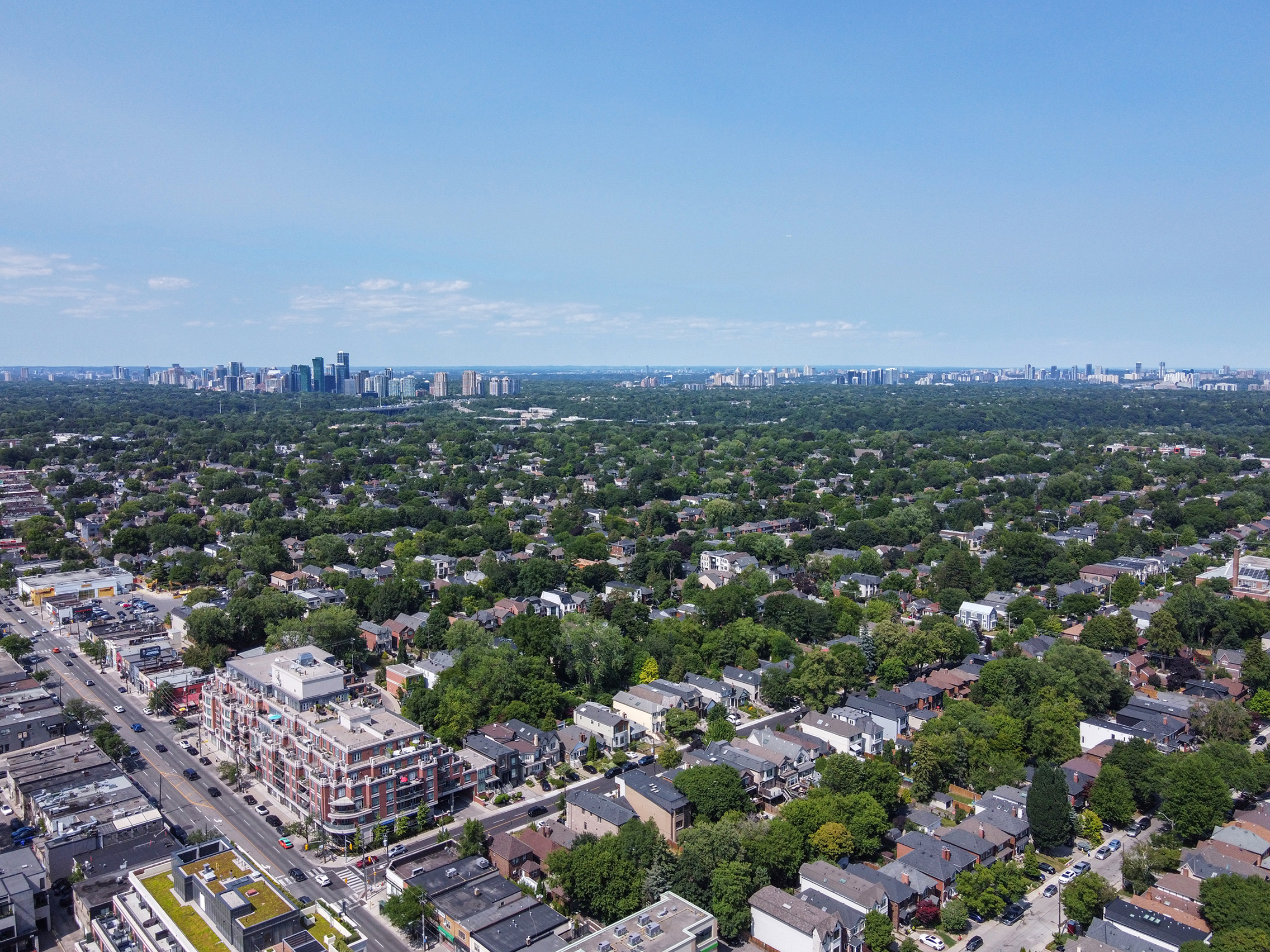
- Aerial view of Bedford Park near Avenue Road (2025)

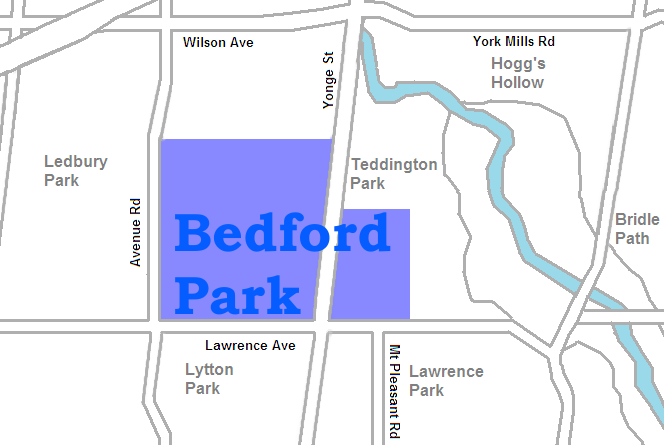
- Location of Bedford Park
- Country: Canada
- Province: Ontario
- City: Toronto

Bedford Park is a neighbourhood in Toronto. It borders Lawrence Park (to the southeast) which was ranked Canada's wealthiest neighbourhood in 2011. The City of Toronto's neighbourhood definitions places most of Bedford Park, including Bedford Park Avenue in the Lawrence Park North Planning Neighbourood and the remaining western and northern portions of Bedford Park within a larger neighbourhood, called Bedford Park-Nortown. The border of this larger area extend to Bathurst Street on the west, Highway 401 to the north, Hillhurst Boulevard (just north of Eglinton Avenue) to the south, and zigzags from northeast to southwest along Yonge Street and Avenue Road.

There are three census tracts created by Statistics Canada in Bedford Park: 0141.01, 0141.02, 0142.00.

== History ==
The area began as a hamlet that was a popular stopover for farmers making their way to market in the city. The neighbourhood was likely named after the Bedford Park Hotel, which opened in 1873 at the southwest corner of Yonge Street and Fairlawn Avenue, just north of Lawrence Avenue. The corner now houses Sebastien patisserie.

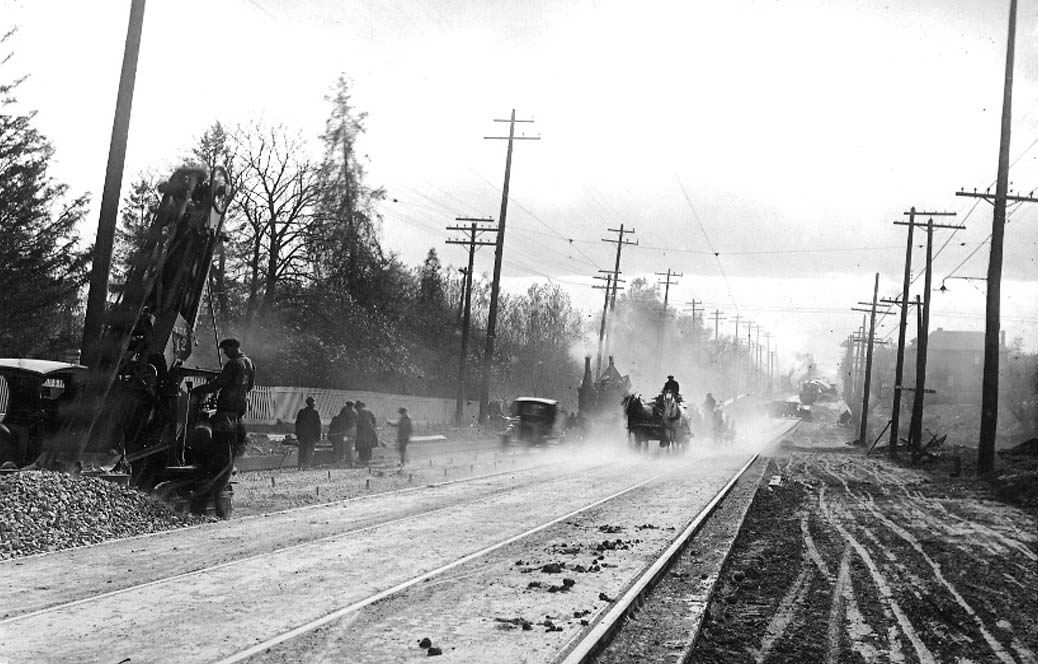
Work on streetcar rails on Lawrence Avenue and Yonge Street, c. 1922. Streetcars service began in Bedford Park in 1890.

In 1890 Bedford Park was amalgamated with the hamlets of Davisville and Eglinton to the south, and incorporated as the Town of North Toronto. In the same year, the Metropolitan Street Railway of Toronto began service to the area, encouraging residential development.

Bedford Park is bisected by Yonge Street, lying north of Lawrence Avenue and east of Avenue Road. The northern boundary is Brooke Avenue on the West side of Yonge, and Snowdon Avenue to the east of Yonge. The eastern boundary is Ronan Avenue. There is also a school north east of Yonge and Lawrence called Bedford Park Public School.

The original homes in the area were constructed between 1890 and 1940. Bedford Park was conceived as a middle class housing development on the northern boundary of the city, with mid-sized detached and semi-detached homes. The relocation of the Rosedale Golf Club in 1909 to the section of the Don Valley northeast of Bedford Park brought about development of the (more moneyed) bordering neighbourhoods of Lawrence Park and Teddington Park. This has skyrocketed the property values of Bedford Park homes.

Bedford Park's quiet streets, mature trees, good schools and parks, and proximity to Highway 401 and Lawrence subway station attract young professionals and their families to the neighbourhood. Many of the original homes still stand, with a number having undergone extensive renovations. A portion of the original homes in the neighbourhood have been torn down and replaced with larger, more modern homes.

== Demographics ==
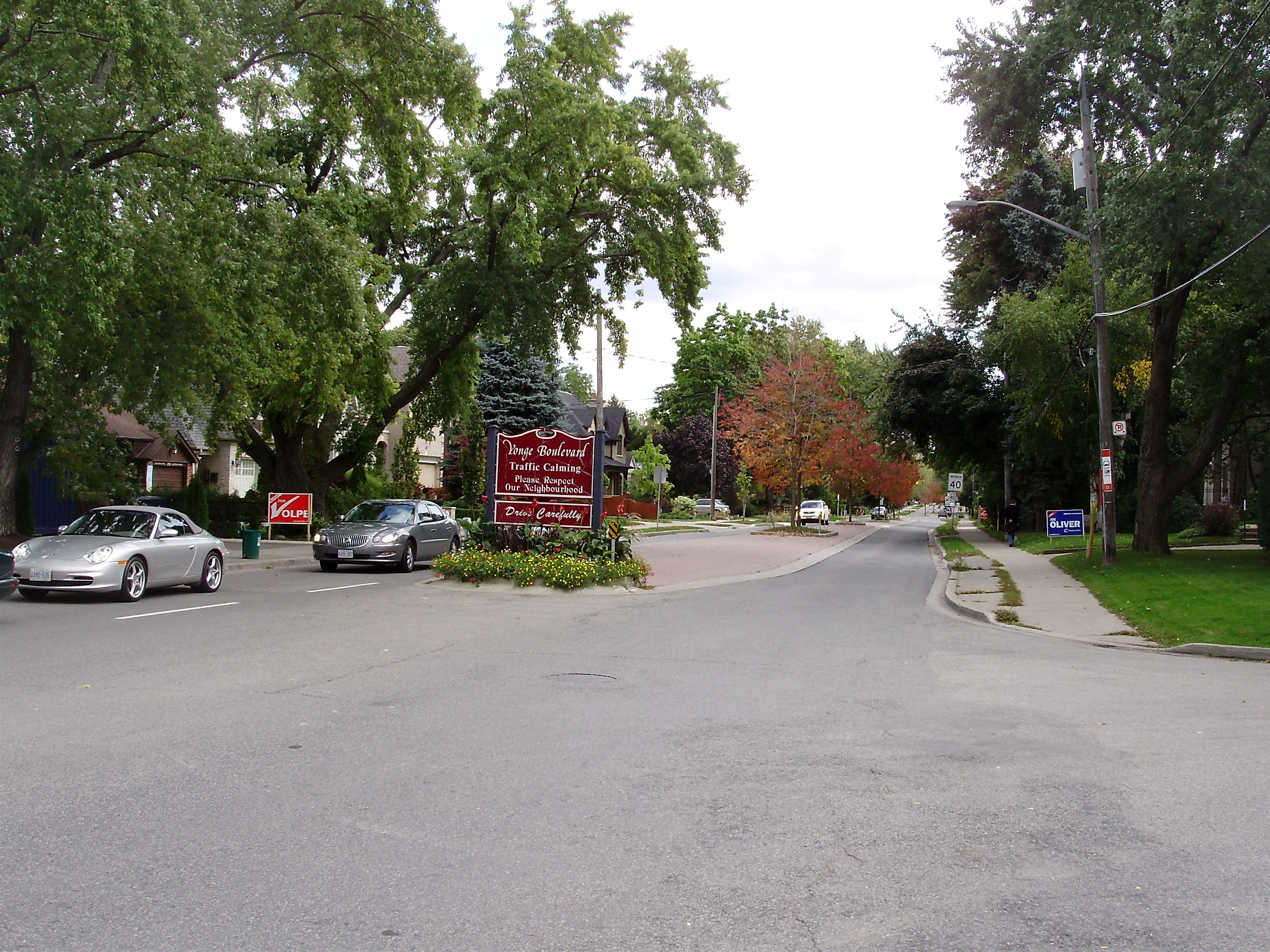
View of a residential street in Bedford Park. More than half of Bedford Park residents stated they were a third-generation Canadian or higher in the Canada 2011 Census.

In 2011, there were 4599 people living in Bedford Park, 2260 male and 2375 female. 53% were third or higher generation Canadian, meaning the resident and both parents were born in Canada. 26.2% were second generation and 20.7% were first generation (immigrants).

In 2006, there were 4360 residents, 2105 male and 2220 female. 50% were third or higher generation. 28.8% were second generation and 21.2% were first generation.

The city is Census Tract 0141.02.

(Census/NHS 2011, Census 2006)

=== Income ===
The family median income in 2016 was $190,000 and in 2021 the median increased to $228,000.

(City of Toronto - Neighbourhood Profile Data)

== Education ==
In Bedford Park, secular English-oriented public schools are operated by the Toronto District School Board. Publicly funded English-oriented Catholic schools are operated by the Toronto Catholic District School Board. In the City of Toronto, secular French-oriented public schools are provided by Conseil scolaire Viamonde, whereas French-oriented public Catholic schools are provided by Conseil scolaire catholique MonAvenir, although neither French school boards operate a school in Bedford Park. The following public schools are located in the Bedford Park:

- John Wanless Public School – an elementary school located at Fairlawn Avenue established in 1926.
- Blessed Sacrament Catholic School – an elementary school located at Bedford Park Avenue established in 1927.
- Bedford Park Public School – an elementary school located at Ranleigh Avenue established in 1911.
