= Leslieville =

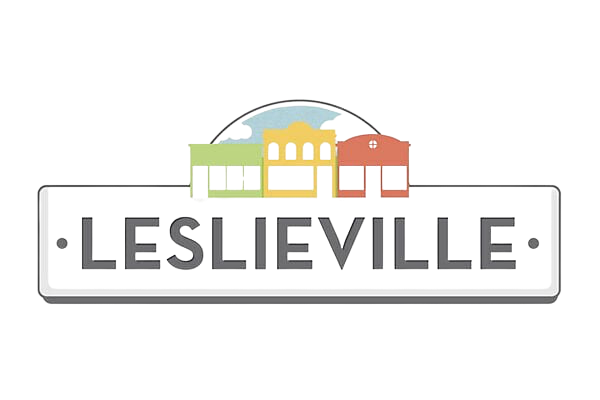
Leslieville
- Neighbourhood
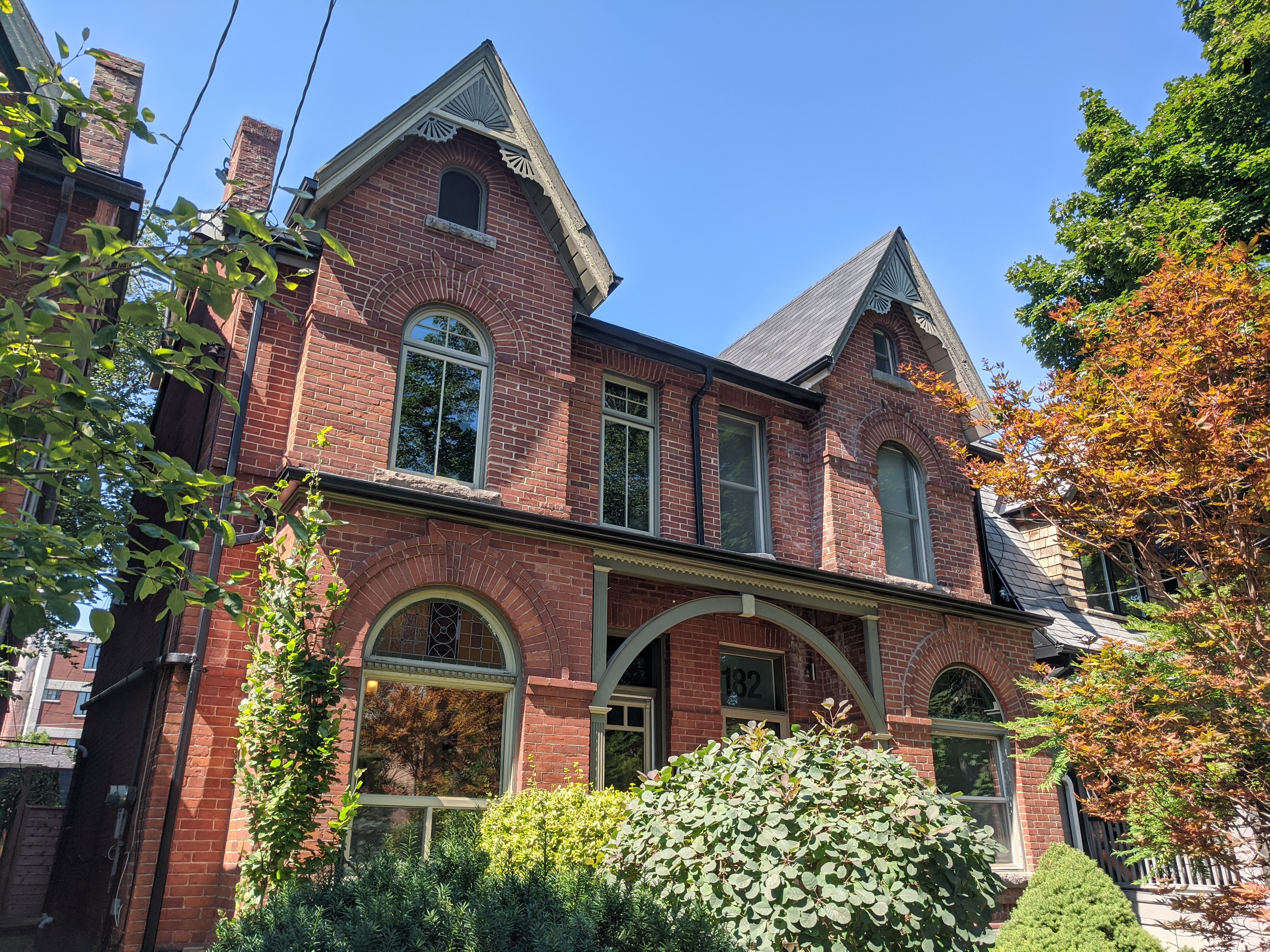
- Typical Leslieville homes

- Location within Toronto
- Coordinates: 43.661927°N 79.332039°W
- Country: Canada
- Province: Ontario
- City: Toronto

Government
  - City Councillor: Paula Fletcher (Independent)
  - Federal M.P.: Julie Dabrusin (Liberal)
  - Provincial M.P.P.: Peter Tabuns (NDP)

Population
  - Total: 25,693

Leslieville is a neighbourhood in Toronto, Ontario, Canada, situated east of the Don River. It is bounded by the Canadian National railway line and Gerrard Street to the north, McGee Street to the west, Eastern Avenue to south, and Coxwell Avenue to the east.

== History ==
This east-end neighbourhood forms part of the broader neighbourhood of South Riverdale. Leslieville began as a small village in the 1850s, which grew up around the Toronto Nurseries owned by George Leslie (1804-1893) and sons, after whom the community is named. Most of Leslieville's residents were gardeners or were employed at one of the brick-making factories in the area. Leslie's home at Queen and Leslie no longer exists but the general store remains on Queen east of Jones Avenue.

Alexander Muir, the composer of The Maple Leaf Forever, was the first principal of the Leslieville Public School, one of the first buildings in the village. Muir was inspired when a brilliant maple leaf fell on his jacket from a Leslieville tree. That tree fell on July 19, 2013, and only its trunk exists today in front of Maple Cottage within Maple Leaf Forever Park. Its offspring still grows in the park behind the cottage.

For decades, South Riverdale was home to light industry, particularly along Eastern Ave. south of Queen St. Metal processing and tanning were notable industries which, along with other industrial activity, left Leslieville and South Riverdale with a legacy of contaminated land. In 2000, the A.R. Clarke Tannery(c.1876 and now C.C. Leather Inc) went up in flames, burning for days and unleashing toxic ash on the surrounding neighbourhood. Almost all these industrial areas have now been abandoned and are being redeveloped.

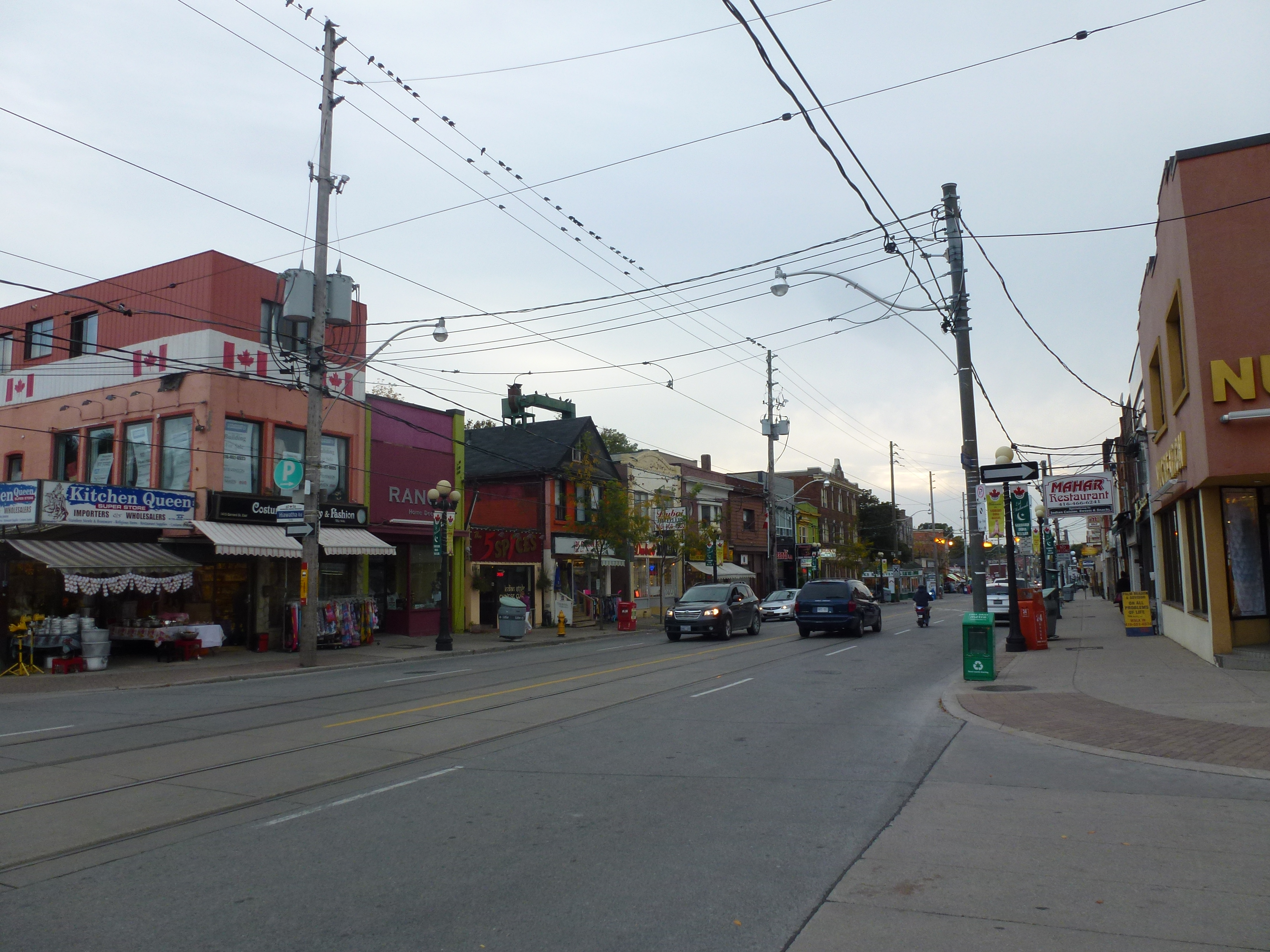
Leslieville experienced rapid gentrification between 2000 and 2010, with new restaurants, shops and cafes moving into the area.

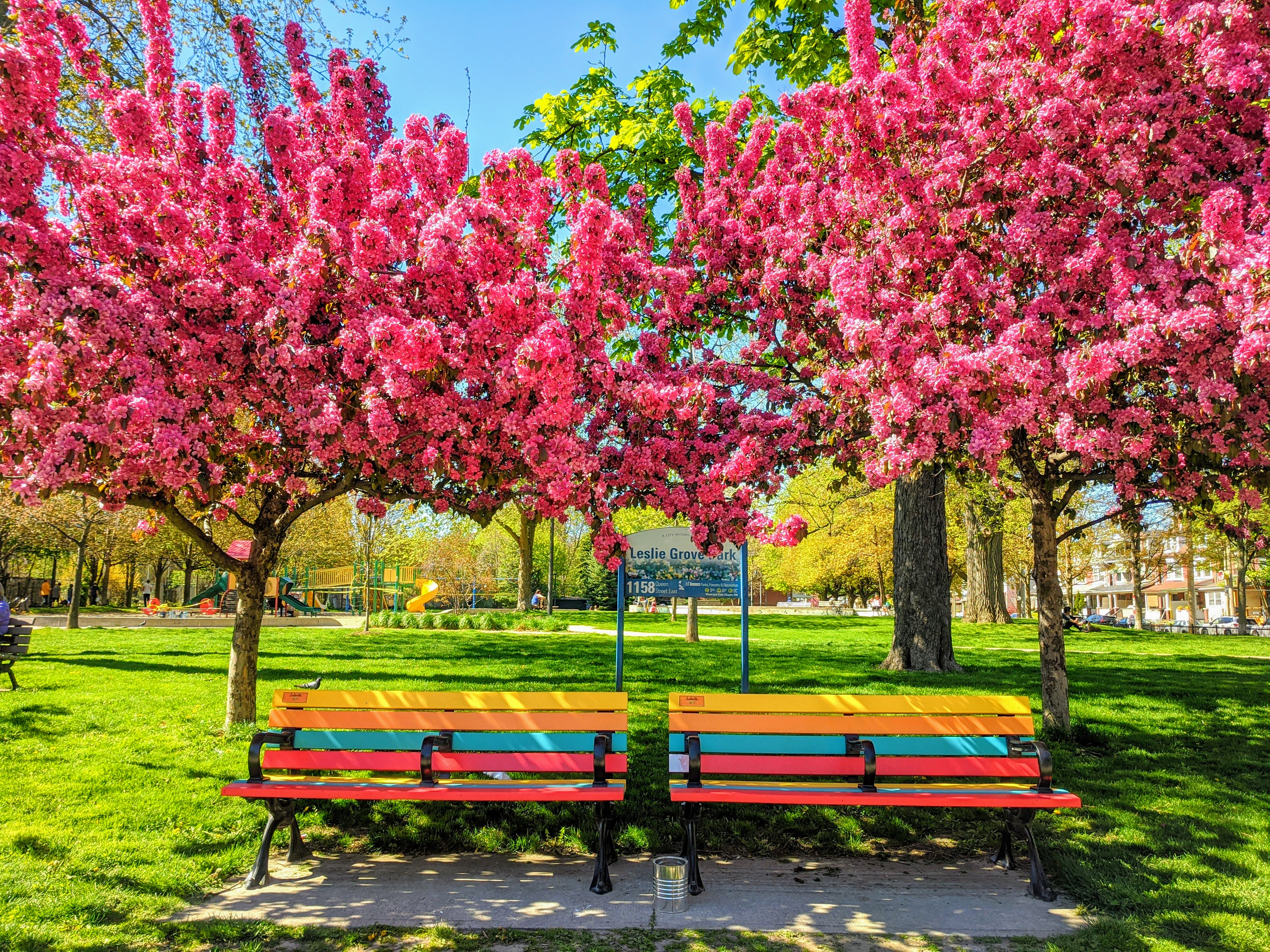
Leslie Grove Park in 2020.

Leslieville once mainly housed those who worked in the factories, and their departure has greatly changed the area. The reduction in air pollution and fumes have made it much more appealing to members of the middle and creative class. Several industrial buildings in the immediate area, including north along Carlaw, have been revamped into condominiums. Large film studios have opened in some of the former industrial areas, including Cinevillage and Showline Studios. Just to the south, in the Port Lands area, the massive new Pinewood Toronto Studios have been built.

A fortified site along Eastern Avenue was the main Toronto base of the Hells Angels until it was raided by police and confiscated in 2007. Just to the southeast of the neighbourhood is the massive Ashbridges Bay Wastewater Treatment Plant, Canada's second largest sewage treatment plant after Montreal's Jean-R. Marcotte facility.

== Landmarks ==
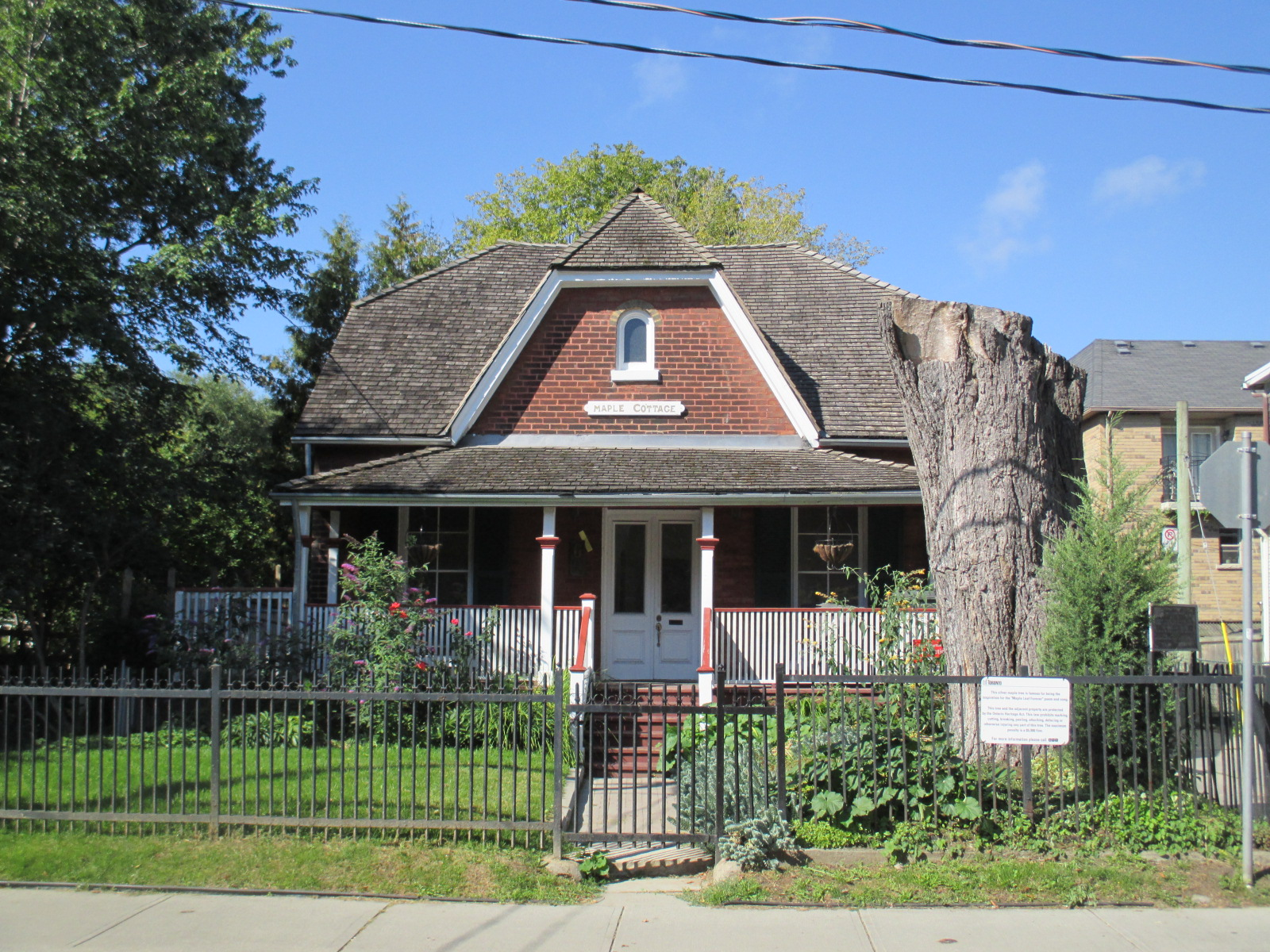
Maple Cottage, former home of Alexander Muir, composer of The Maple Leaf Forever. Built in 1873, the home is presently a part of Maple Leaf Forever Park.

- Ashbridge Estate
- Pape Avenue Cemetery
- Gerrard India Bazaar
- Russell Carhouse (a.k.a. Connaught Barns) - streetcar facility on Connaught Avenue between Queen Street and Eastern Avenue since 1916
- Maple Leaf Forever Park

=== Churches ===
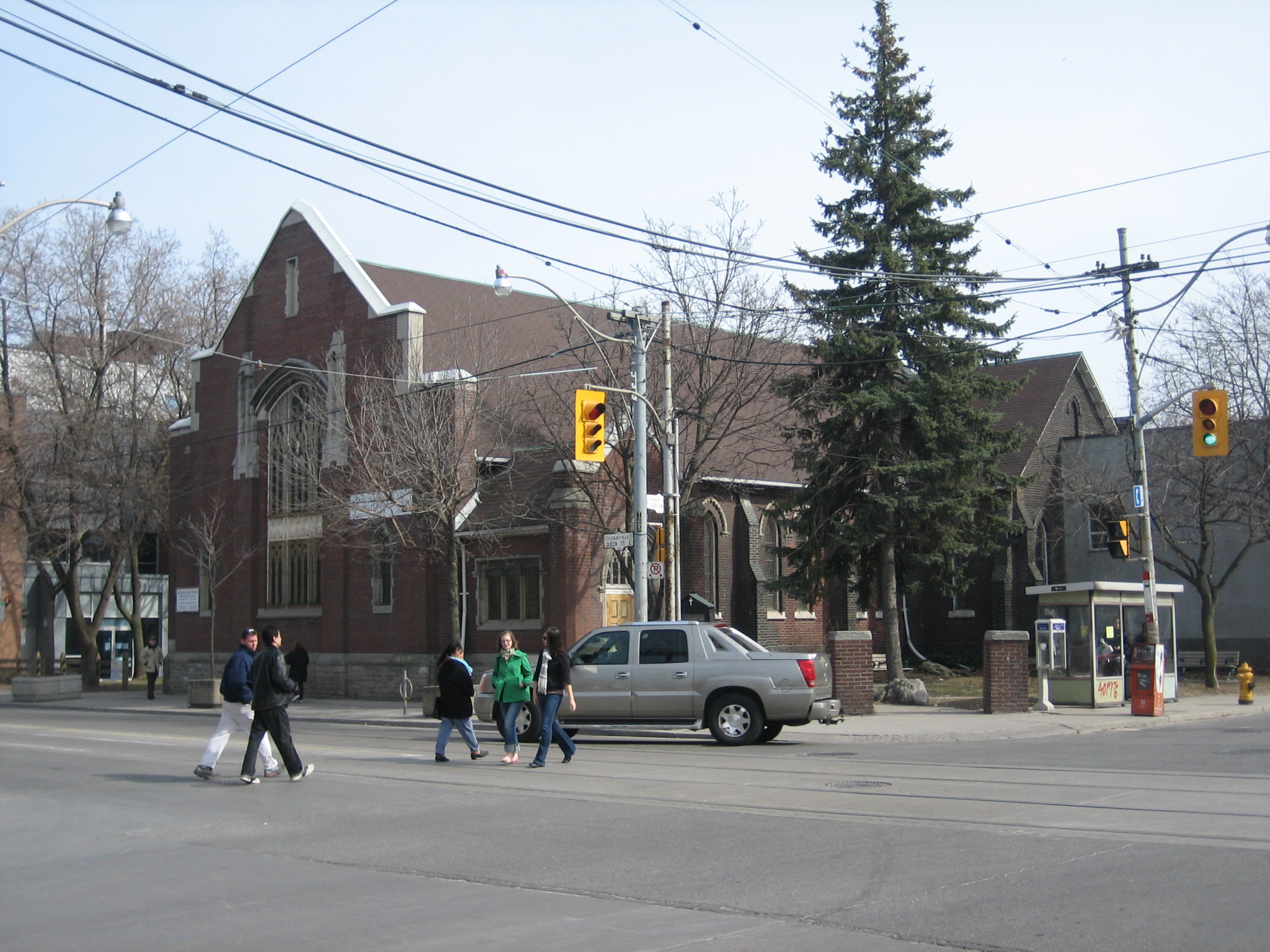
Queen Street East Presbyterian Church in 2009.

- Glen Rhodes United Church
- Living Hope Community Church
- Queen Street East Presbyterian Church
- St. Anargyroi Old Calendar Greek Orthodox
- St. Matthew's Cathedral
- St. Joseph's Roman Catholic Church
- Toronto Gospel Lighthouse

== Political representation ==
Leslieville is in the federal political riding of Toronto-Danforth, represented by Liberal MP Julie Dabrusin. Municipally, Leslieville is in Toronto Ward 14, represented by City Councillor Paula Fletcher. The seat in the Ontario provincial parliament is currently held by New Democrat Peter Tabuns, elected in the March 30, 2006 by-election and then re-elected in the 2007 general election.

Federally, the riding was represented by New Democrats from 1965 until 1988; past MPs include Bob Rae (1978-1982), who resigned to become leader of the provincial NDP, and was later Premier of Ontario in the NDP majority government of 1990-1995. In the 1988 federal election, the seat was won by Liberal Dennis Mills. Mills held the riding until Jack Layton of the New Democratic Party regained the seat in the 2004 Canadian federal election.

The provincial seat was previously held by Marilyn Churley, then deputy leader of the New Democratic Party of Ontario, until she resigned prior to an unsuccessful bid for the adjacent federal seat of Beaches-East York in the January 2006 federal election. Provincially, the riding has elected a New Democrat in every election and by-election since 1963.

== See also ==
- List of neighbourhoods in Toronto
