= Lawrence County Airport =

Lawrence County Airport may refer to:

- Lawrenceburg-Lawrence County Airport in Lawrence County, Tennessee, United States (FAA: 2M2)
- Lawrence County Airpark in Lawrence County, Ohio, United States (FAA: HTW)
- Courtland Airport, formerly Lawrence County Airport, in Lawrence County, Alabama, United States (FAA: 9A4)

== See also ==
- Lawrence County (disambiguation)
- Lawrence Airport (disambiguation)
- Lawrence Municipal Airport (disambiguation)
