= Alexander Muir Memorial Gardens =

Municipal park in Toronto, Ontario, Canada

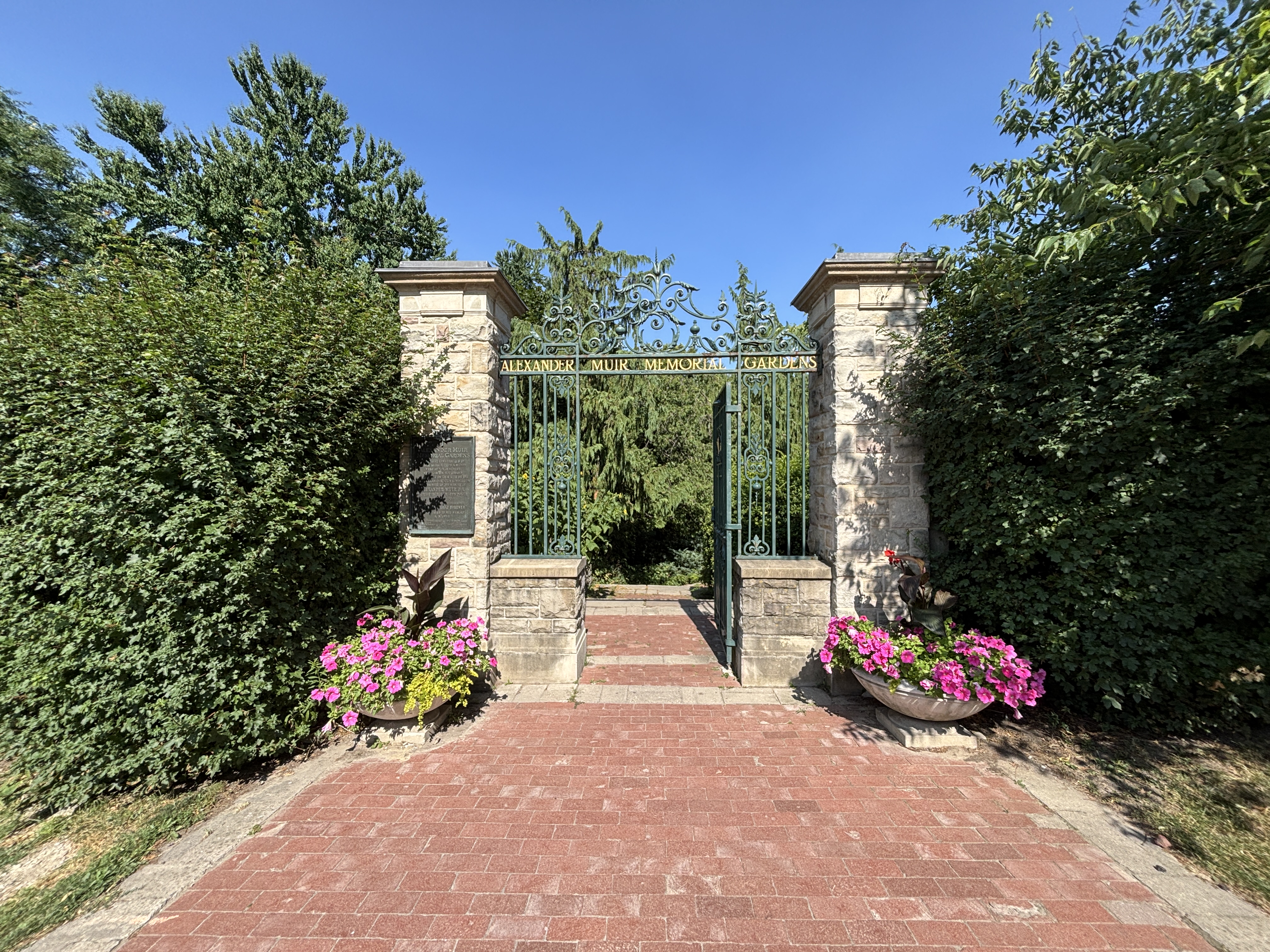
- Alexander Muir Memorial Gardens Gate

- Location within Toronto
- Interactive map of Alexander Muir Memorial Gardens
- Type: Urban park
- Location: 2901 Yonge Street, Toronto, Ontario, Canada
- Coordinates: 43°43′17″N 79°24′05″W
- Owner: City of Toronto
- Operator: Toronto Parks, Forestry & Recreation
- Public transit: Lawrence Station
- Website: Alexander Muir Memorial Gardens

Alexander Muir Memorial Gardens is a municipal park in Toronto, Ontario, Canada. The park was created in 1933 by public subscription to honour Alexander Muir, who composed the song "The Maple Leaf Forever". The park was originally located opposite Mount Pleasant Cemetery on Yonge Street, but was moved to its present location in 1951 due to the construction of the Yonge subway. Today the park is in Toronto's Lawrence Park neighbourhood south of Lawrence Avenue with an entrance on the east side of Yonge Street.

== History ==
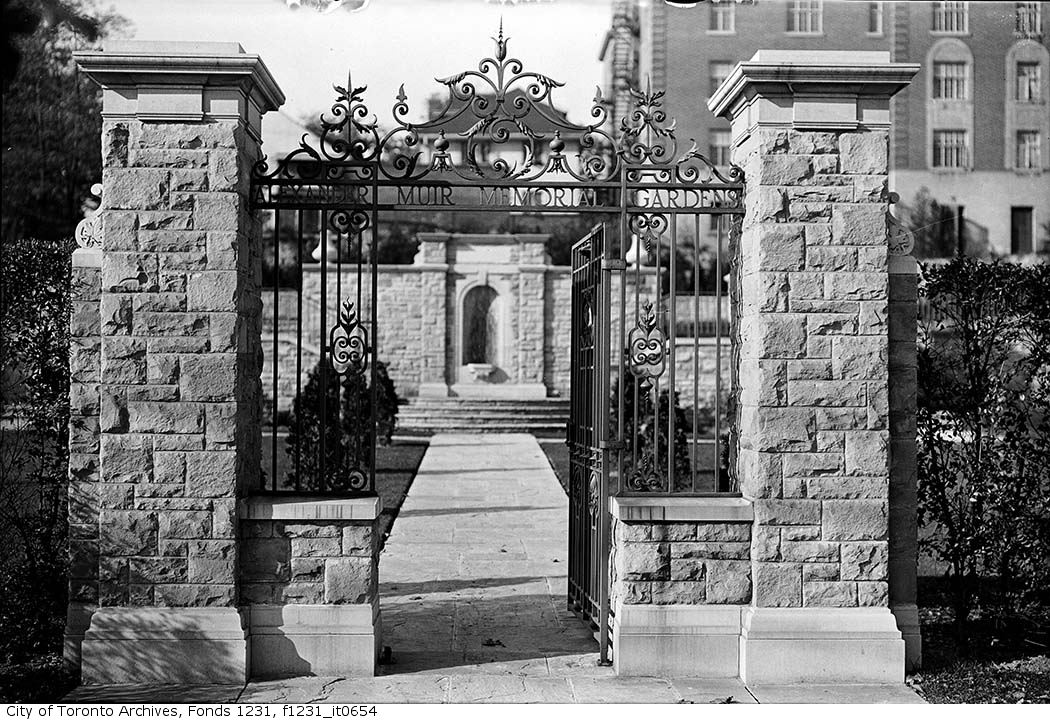
Gate and monument (background) located opposite Mount Pleasant Cemetery in 1935.

Alexander Muir Memorial Gardens was founded in 1933 but was originally located on the west side of Yonge Street across from Mount Pleasant Cemetery, where Muir is buried. Landscape architect Edwin Kay designed the original park using the maple leaf as a theme. The park was to celebrate Toronto's centennial in 1934 as well as to honour Muir. The park's creation was supported by public subscriptions.

To make room for the construction of the Davisville subway yard, the Toronto Transportation Commission moved the park, including its stone walls and plants, to its current location starting in 1951. The cost of the move was over CA$100,000 (equivalent to $1,189,855 in 2025). The park at its present location was formally dedicated on May 28, 1952. Edwin Kay's formal, symmetrical design was replicated at the new location.

The subway tunnel portal at the south end of the Davisville Yard is called the Muir Portal because of the park that used to be there.

In 1990, an international jury declared Alexander Muir Memorial Gardens to be one of the best 25 urban design projects built before 1985 in Toronto.

== Park features ==
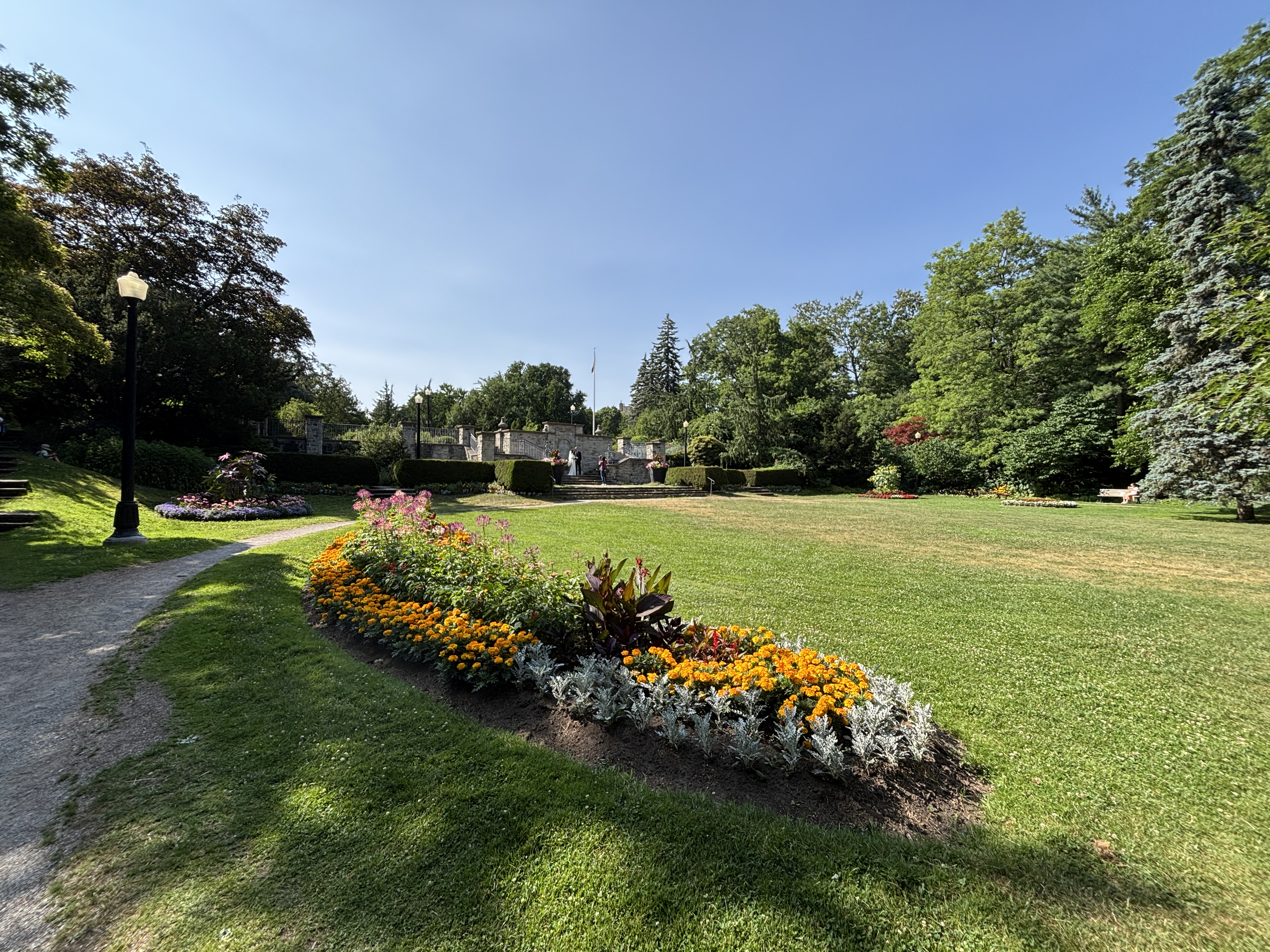
Monument to Alexander Muir within the Gardens.

Alexander Muir Memorial Gardens feature formal flower gardens with roses, herbs, and multi-tiered beds. There is a decorative gate at the Yonge Street entrance bearing a plaque depicting a maple leaf to commemorate Muir and the park's 1952 reopening. Inside the park, there is a stone retaining wall that is also a monument dedicated to Muir inscribed with the refrain of The Maple Leaf Forever. The Gardens contain stone balconies and steps, crushed brick pathways and sunken gardens enclosed by maple, willow and oak trees.

The park is popular for wedding photography.

Alexander Muir Memorial Gardens is part of a chain of parks leading eastwards along Blythwood Ravine Park, Sherwood Park, and Sunnydene Park to Bayview Avenue. The Gardens are part of the self-guided tour: Northern Ravines & Gardens Discovery Walk. On the south side of the Gardens, Alexander Muir Road descends into Blythwood Ravine to serve Lawrence Park Lawn Bowling & Croquet Club.

The Toronto Legacy Project and Heritage Toronto erected a plaque in honour of astronomer Helen Sawyer Hogg at the extreme southwest corner of the park. Between 1962 and 1965, Hogg lived in the apartment building at 2875 Yonge Street which is adjacent to the park.

== See also ==
- Maple Leaf Forever Park
