= St Lawrence railway station =

St Lawrence railway station may refer to:

- St Lawrence railway station (Isle of Wight), UK (closed in 1952)
- St Lawrence for Pegwell Bay railway station, Kent, UK (closed in 1916)
- St Lawrence railway station, Queensland, Australia
- St. Lawrence Avenue (IRT Pelham Line), a New York City Subway station in the Bronx, New York
- St Lawrence Police Station, in St Lawrence, Queensland

== See also ==
- Lawrence Station (disambiguation)
