= Lawrence Airport =

Lawrence Airport may refer to:

- Clearfield-Lawrence Airport in Clearfield, Pennsylvania, United States (FAA: FIG)
- Corry-Lawrence Airport in Corry, Pennsylvania, United States (FAA: 8G2)

== See also ==
- Lawrence County Airport (disambiguation)
- Lawrence Municipal Airport (disambiguation)
