= Maple Leaf Forever Park =

Park in Toronto, Canada

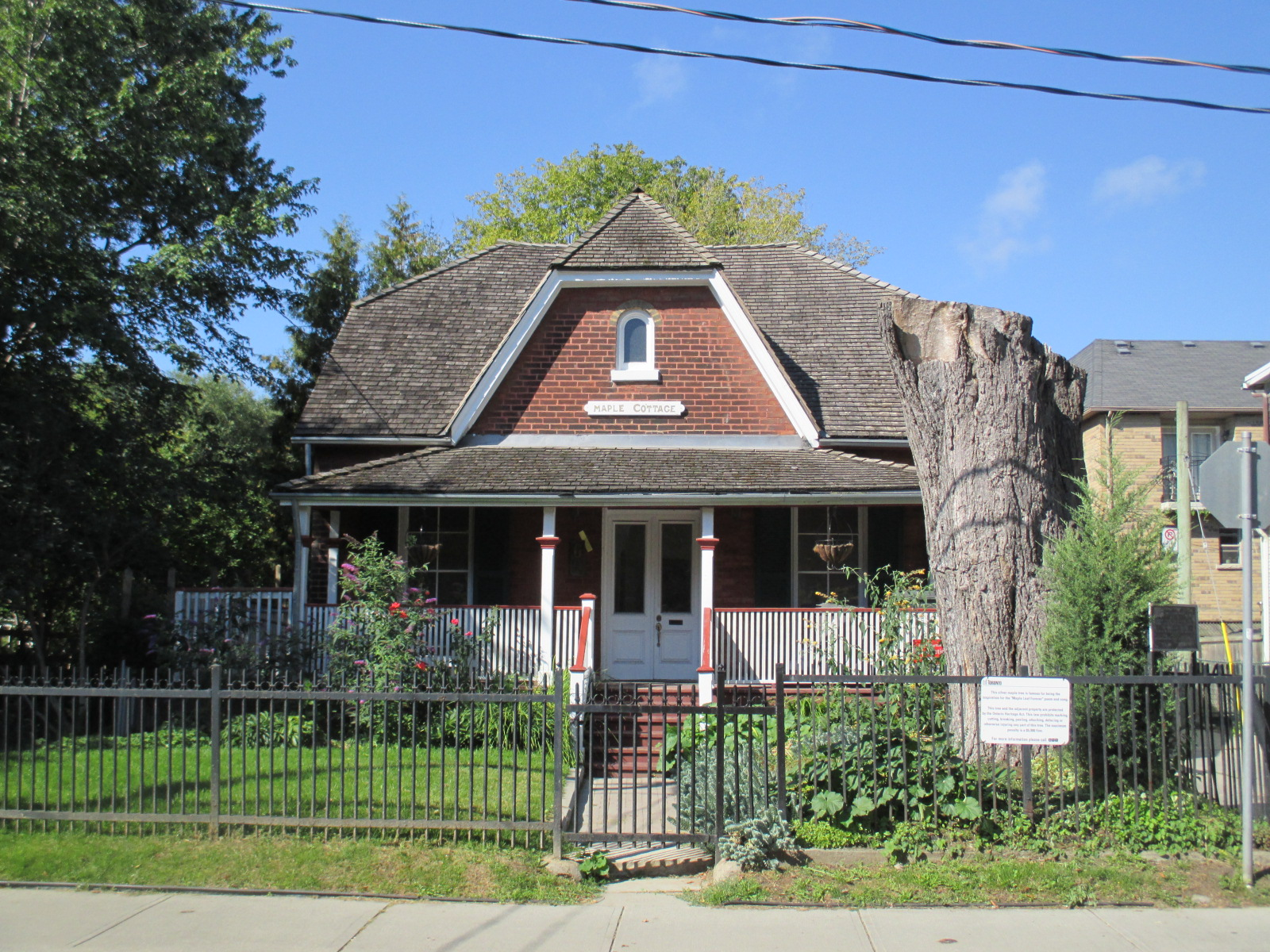
- Maple Cottage and the trunk of the fabled maple tree (right)

- Location within Toronto
- Type: Urban park
- Location: 62 Laing Street, Toronto, Ontario, Canada
- Coordinates: 43°39′47″N 79°19′40″W
- Owner: City of Toronto
- Operator: Toronto Parks, Forestry & Recreation
- Public transit: 501 Queen, 502 Downtowner and 503 Kingston Rd
- Website: Maple Leaf Forever Park

Maple Leaf Forever Park is a municipal park in Toronto, Ontario, Canada. The park is named after the song "The Maple Leaf Forever" composed by Alexander Muir. The park was created in 1933 by public subscription to honour the composer, and is located in Leslieville south of Queen Street East between Leslie Street and Greenwood Avenue.

== Park features ==
The main features of the park, all related to Alexander Muir, are:

- Maple Cottage, allegedly Muir's former residence, which was built circa 1871.
- The remains of a 150-year-old silver maple that allegedly inspired Muir to write the song: The tree was felled by a wind storm on July 19, 2013, and only its lower trunk remains at the north-east corner of the front yard of Maple Cottage. Prior to the wind storm, the tree was dying.
- A young silver maple that is the offspring of Muir's tree: Seeing that the 150-year-old maple was dying, a couple living in The Beaches acquired more than a dozen maple keys from the tree; only one survived which the couple raised in their backyard. In 2007, the young tree was transplanted into the middle of Maple Leaf Forever Park where it can be seen today.

In the front yard of Maple Cottage, there is a plaque commemorating Muir and his song. It was erected in 1958 by the Grand Orange Lodge to replace an earlier plaque erected in 1930.

== Legend ==
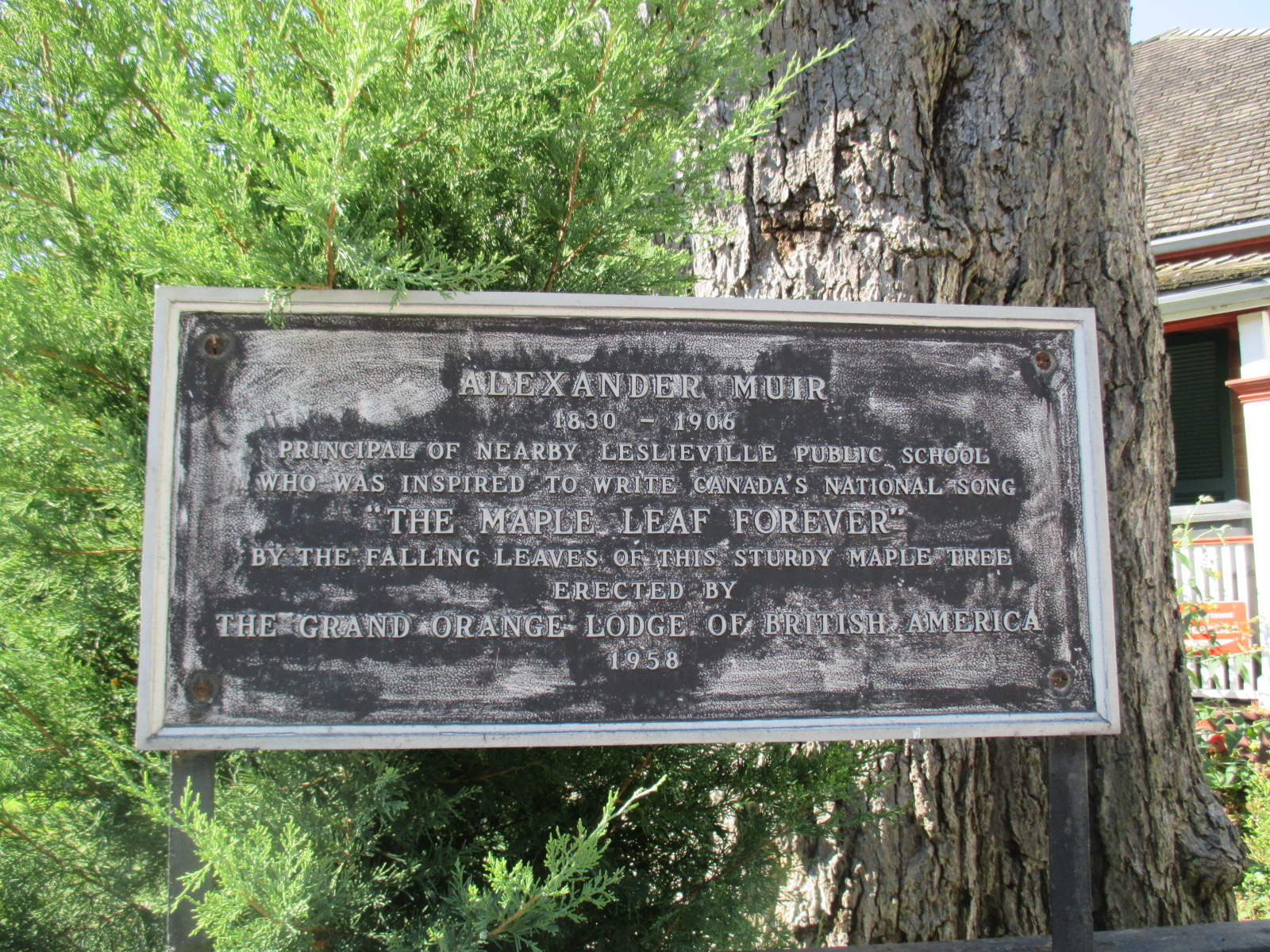
Plaque erected by the Orange Lodge in 1958 supporting the legend

According to legend, Alexander Muir was the owner of Maple Cottage when he composed the song "The Maple Leaf Forever" in 1867. He was inspired to write the song when he saw a leaf fall from the silver maple tree standing in front of the cottage.

Unlike local residents, historians are skeptical that the 150-year-old tree at Maple Cottage was the inspiration for Muir's song.

George Leslie, after whom Leslieville is named, wrote in a local newspaper that he and Muir were walking together when a maple leaf landed on Leslie's arm. Leslie turned to Muir and suggested he write a poem about the maple leaf. Leslie recalled the location was on Queen Street East rather than on Laing Street where the alleged tree of inspiration grew. In January 1909, Muir's widow told a similar version of the story to John Ross Robertson, who wrote a chapter on Muir in his book "Landmarks of Toronto".

According to Robin Elliott, editor of the Institute for Canadian Music, the 1930 Orange Lodge plaque may be the first mention of the Maple Cottage tree being the inspiration for "The Maple Leaf for Ever."

Elliott casts doubt that Muir ever lived at Maple Cottage citing John Ross Robertson's 1914 book Landmarks of Toronto which details Muir's residences from the age of three to his death but makes no mention of 62 Laing Street. However, the book cited 2 nearby residences where Muir dwelled between 1863 and 1869.

Also, according to the Toronto Historical Board, the cottage was built in 1873 – 6 years after the song was composed in October 1867.

In 1991, the provincial Conservation Review Board recommended the "designation of the property at 62 Laing Street as a property of historical value or interest"; however, it noted that Maple Cottage was built in 1871 after the composition of the song. The board also wrote: "In assessing the evidence that was presented in favour of designation, this Board is aware that there are many gaps that cast some doubt on the historical testimony".

== Maple Cottage ==
In 1991, John J.G. Blumenson, Preservation Officer, Toronto Historical Board, described Maple Cottage as:

A variant on the Ontario cottage style with a central gable, the 1873 structure, one of the earliest in the neighbourhood, is a rare example of early residential construction in the area. The house is a one-and-one-half storey frame and brick cottage on a raised foundation. On the facade, the doorway is flanked by large sash windows. These windows are also found on the north and south sides. A verandah runs the full length of the ground floor facade. The original house, however, has been altered. The roofline was changed when the gable was truncated, and much of the original detailing of the verandah was removed; the sides were bricked some years after construction; the door was replaced. Two rear additions to the house were built one about 1900 and another later still. The fence was built sometime in the 1950s.

Maple Cottage became a community centre in 2002. At that time, the cottage had a large meeting room, two offices, a kitchen, and a smaller room.

== See also ==
- Alexander Muir Memorial Gardens
