= George Leslie (Upper Canada) =

George Leslie Sr.
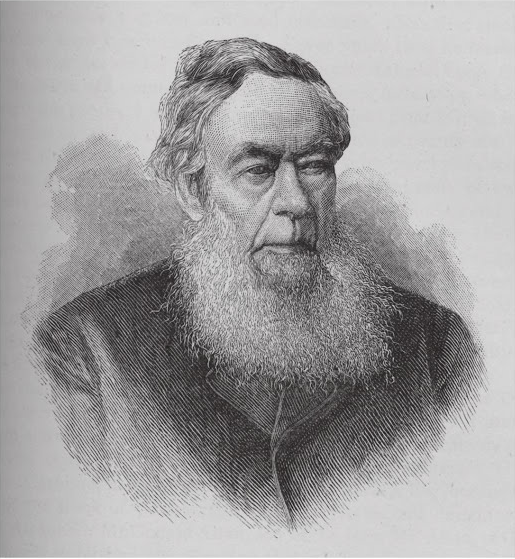
- Born: 1804; Sutherlandshire, Scotland
- Died: 1893 (aged 88–89)
- Occupation: Horticulturist

George Leslie Sr. (1804–1893) was a gardener in Scotland and Upper Canada, a plant merchant, a magistrate and the namesake of Leslieville (now a neighbourhood of Toronto).

== Life and career ==
A Scottish immigrant to Upper Canada, he was born in 1804. He arrived with his parents, William and Esther, and his siblings, settling at Streetsville in what is now Mississauga. Sources give the arrival date as either 1824 or 1825. the family lived in log house on land later acquired by John Leslie. The house is now located at 4415 Mississauga Road.

Leslie had worked as a gardener in Scotland and continued working as a gardener in Upper Canada for the province's richer residents, including Bishop John Strachan and Chief Justice William Campbell. He would later found a plant nursery east of the boundaries of Toronto, on land originally granted to John Small. In 1834, Leslie was one of the founders of the Toronto Horticultural Society.

Leslie married in 1836 and opened a store in Toronto, the first to be lit by gas, a novelty that attracted sightseers. His Toronto store had a small nursery, but the nursery that Leslie started in 1845, near the street now named after him (Leslie Street), grew to 150 acres (61 hectares) and was considered the largest in the country at that time.

Leslieville, the community that grew up around his nursery, acquired a post office, and a railway station. In 1853, Leslie was appointed a magistrate.

Leslie passed the nursery to his children (George Jr., John Knox), who divided the property up into lots.
