= Lawrence Township =

Lawrence Township may refer to:

== Arkansas ==
- Lawrence Township, Lawrence County, Arkansas, in Lawrence County, Arkansas

== Illinois ==
- Lawrence Township, Lawrence County, Illinois

== Indiana ==
- Lawrence Township, Marion County, Indiana

== Kansas ==
- Lawrence Township, Cloud County, Kansas
- Lawrence Township, Osborne County, Kansas, in Osborne County, Kansas

== Michigan ==
- Lawrence Township, Michigan

== Minnesota ==
- Lawrence Township, Grant County, Minnesota
- Lawrence Township, Itasca County, Minnesota

== New Jersey ==
- Lawrence Township, Cumberland County, New Jersey
- Lawrence Township, Mercer County, New Jersey

== Ohio ==
- Lawrence Township, Lawrence County, Ohio
- Lawrence Township, Stark County, Ohio
- Lawrence Township, Tuscarawas County, Ohio
- Lawrence Township, Washington County, Ohio

== Pennsylvania ==
- Lawrence Township, Clearfield County, Pennsylvania
- Lawrence Township, Tioga County, Pennsylvania

== South Dakota ==
- Lawrence Township, Charles Mix County, South Dakota, in Charles Mix County, South Dakota
- Lawrence Township, Roberts County, South Dakota, in Roberts County, South Dakota
