= Lawrenceville =

Lawrenceville is the name of several places:

United States

- Lawrenceville, Alabama
- Lawrenceville, former name of Alleene, Arkansas
- Lawrenceville, Georgia
- Lawrenceville, Illinois
- Lawrenceville, Indiana
- Lawrenceville, New Jersey
  - The Lawrenceville School
- Lawrenceville, Greene County, New York, a hamlet within Catskill
- Lawrenceville, St. Lawrence County, New York, a hamlet within Lawrence
- Lawrenceville, Ohio
- Lawrenceville, Pennsylvania
- Lawrenceville (Pittsburgh), Pennsylvania
- Lawrenceville, Virginia
- Lawrenceville, West Virginia

Canada

- Lawrenceville, Quebec

== See also ==
- Lawrence (disambiguation)
- Lawrenceburg (disambiguation)
