= Lawrence Municipal Airport =

Lawrence Municipal Airport may refer to:

- Lawrence Municipal Airport (Kansas) in Lawrence, Kansas, United States (FAA/IATA: LWC)
- Lawrence Municipal Airport (Massachusetts) in Lawrence, Massachusetts, United States (FAA/IATA: LWM)

== See also ==
- Lawrence Airport (disambiguation)
- Lawrence County Airport (disambiguation)
