= Lawrance =

Lawrance may refer to

- Lawrance Aero Engine Company
- Lawrance Garden, former name of Bagh-e-Jinnah, a garden in Lahore, Pakistan

== People with the given name ==
- Lawrance Collingwood CBE (1887–1982), English conductor, composer and record producer
- Lawrance Reilly (1928–2013), Scottish footballer
- Lawrance Thompson (1906–1973), American academic
- Lawrance Toafili (born 2001), American football player

== People with the surname ==
- Mary Lawrance (1781–1845), English botanical illustrator
- Hannah Lawrance (1795–1875), English historian and journalist
- Sir John Compton Lawrance (1832–1912), English judge and politician
- Walter Lawrance (1840–1914), Church of England priest
- Charles Lawrance (1882–1950), American aeronautical engineer
- Brian Lawrance (1909–1983), Australian musician
- Jody Lawrance (1930–1986), American actress
- Jeremy Lawrance (born 1952), English linguist and historian

== See also ==
- Lawrence (disambiguation)
