= Lawrenceburg =

Lawrenceburg is the name of several places in the United States of America:

- Lawrenceburg, Indiana
- Lawrenceburg, Kentucky
- Lawrenceburg, Missouri
- Lawrenceburg, Tennessee
- Lawrenceburg, Pennsylvania, a village of Parker, Pennsylvania

== See also ==
- Lawrenceville (disambiguation)
