= Lawrence, Washington =

Unincorporated community in Washington, US

- Unincorporated community
- Location within Washington (state)
- Coordinates: 48°51′27″N 122°17′37″W
- Country: United States
- State: Washington
- County: Whatcom
- Established: 1892
- Elevation: 148 ft (45 m)
- Time zone: UTC-8 (Pacific (PST))
  - Summer (DST): UTC-7 (PDT)
- Area code(s): 360, 564
- GNIS feature ID: 1511093

Lawrence is an unincorporated community in Whatcom County, in the U.S. state of Washington.

== History ==
A post office called Lawrence was established in 1892, and remained in operation until 1931. The community derives its name from Laura Blankenship, the daughter of a local businessman.
