= Lawrence Park, Toronto =

Coordinates: 43.722°N 79.388°W

Lawrence Park
- Neighbourhood
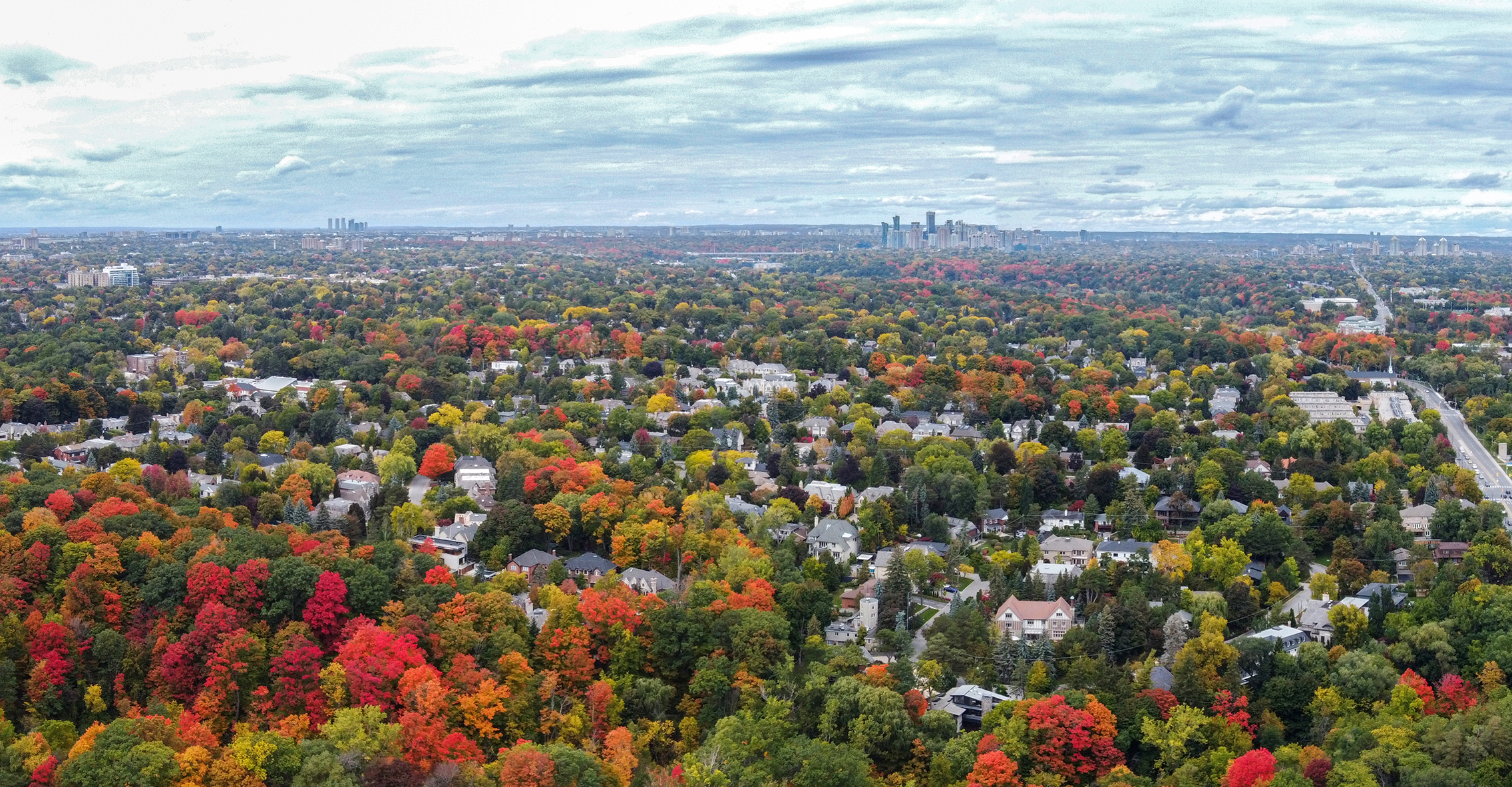
- Aerial view of Lawrence Park in Autumn 2022

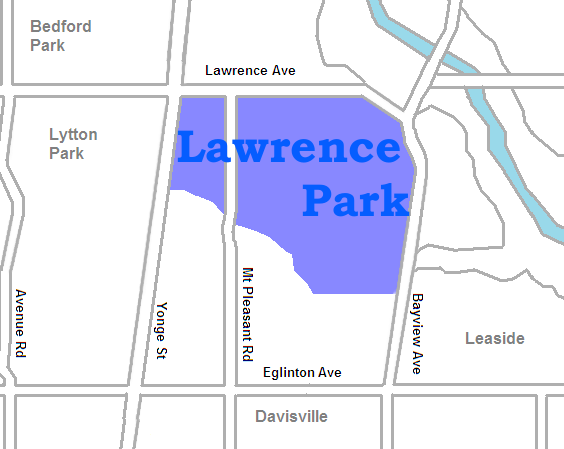
- Country: Canada
- Province: Ontario
- City: Toronto
- Developed: 1907

Government
  - MP: Rob Oliphant (Don Valley West)
  - MPP: Stephanie Bowman (Don Valley West)
  - Councillor: Rachel Chernos Lin (Ward 15 Don Valley West)

Lawrence Park is a neighbourhood in Toronto, Ontario, Canada. It is bordered by Yonge Street to the west and Bayview Avenue to the east, and from Blythwood Ravine on the south to Lawrence Avenue on the north. Lawrence Park was one of Toronto's first planned garden suburbs. Begun in the early part of the 20th century, it did not fully develop until after the Second World War. It was ranked the wealthiest neighbourhood in all of Canada in 2011.

Centred on Mount Pleasant Road, the neighbourhood grew slowly with medium-sized houses on narrow but deep lots. There are few commercial businesses within walking distance. The closest grocery stores are close to Yonge and Lawrence.

In its early years, the neighbourhood's transportation was served predominantly by the northern section of the Toronto Transportation Commission's Yonge streetcar line. When the Yonge subway opened to Eglinton in 1954, the TTC replaced this service with trolley buses on Yonge Street and Mount Pleasant Road, both terminating at the Eglinton station. The trolleys left Yonge when the subway was extended further north in 1973, although a less frequent local bus service remained; the trolleys on Mount Pleasant lasted until 1991, when they too were replaced with regular buses.

Demographically, the neighbourhood still retains a largely Anglo-Protestant population.

== History ==
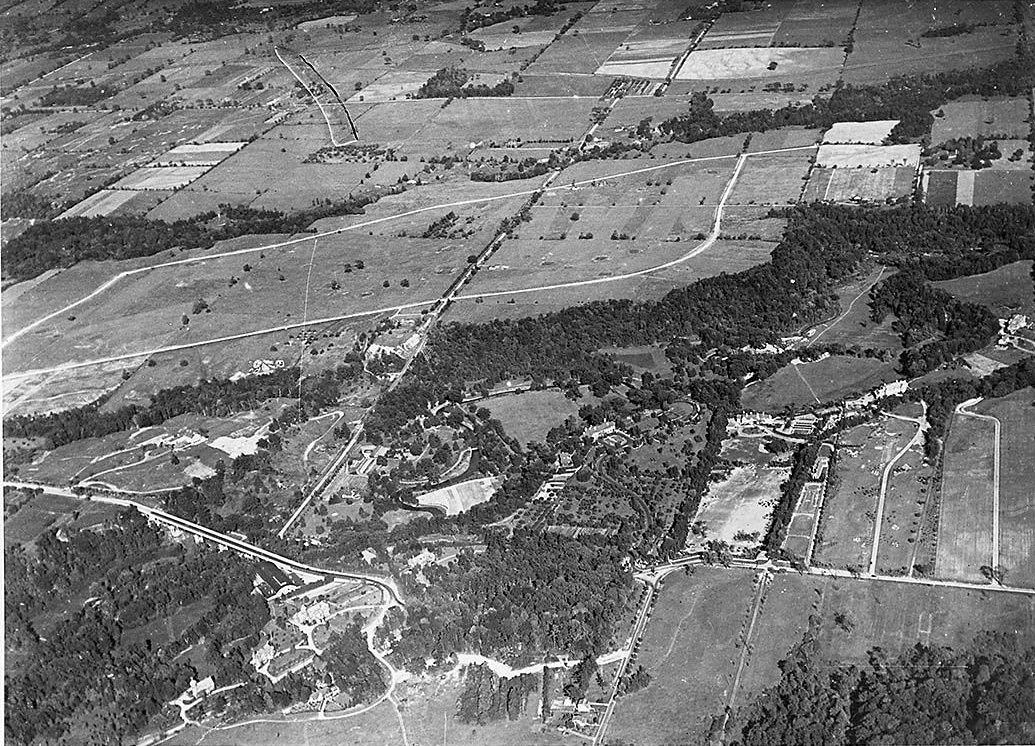
View of Bayview and Lawrence Avenue from the southwest, c. 1930.

The assembly of Lawrence Park began in 1907 by the Dovercourt Land Building and Saving Company, which acquired the north parcel of the park from John Lawrence, after whom this neighborhood is named. The president of the Dovercourt Land Company was Wilfred Servington Dinnick. It was under Dinnick's direction that Lawrence Park was developed as a suburb for the "well do".

In the early years Howard and Lorrie Dunington-Grubb, who later founded Sheridan Nurseries, undertook much of the landscape architecture for the boulevards and parks of the suburb. They also took commissions for garden design from the owners of the new homes.

The first advertisement for Lawrence Park trumpeted it as an ""aristocratic neighborhood", "four hundred feet above Lake Ontario, and Far from the Lake Winds in Winter". However, Lawrence Park's development was sporadic. The building of houses was interrupted by two world wars, a recession, and a depression, and the neighborhood was completed only in the 1950s.

The area west of Mildenhall Road, following the north-south path of Braeside Road beyond Rothmere Drive, was part of the Toronto-North York boundary until 1998.

== Character ==
Lawrence Park is one of Toronto's most exclusive residential neighborhoods. In 2011, Canadian Business magazine named it the wealthiest postal code in Canada by household net worth, averaged at $3.88 million. The Blythwood cluster of the neighborhood, along Bayview Avenue, has an average household income of $622,238, while the West side centered around Mount Pleasant Road has an average household income of $469,448.

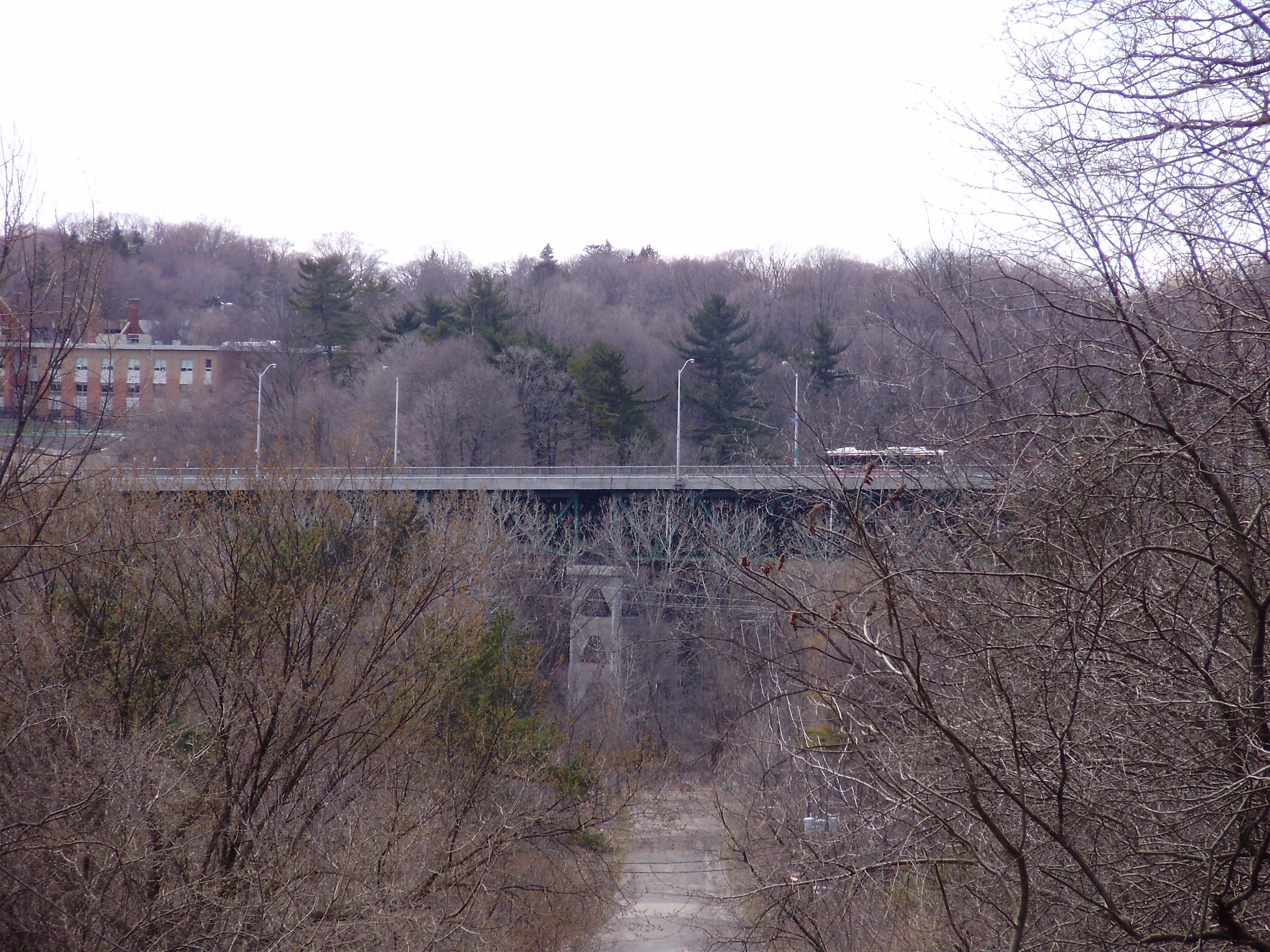
View of Bayview Avenue bridge north of Lawrence Park. The neighbourhood is situated around gently rolling hills, parks, and the Toronto ravine system.

The neighborhood is located in a setting that includes gently rolling hills, several parks, and a ravine. Lawrence Park's shops, schools and recreational facilities are located on its periphery. Many of the residents belong to The Granite Club, a sports and recreation centre on Bayview Avenue north of Lawrence Avenue. The majority of residents in this neighborhood own several properties across Ontario, which include winter chalets in Collingwood and summer cottages in Muskoka, particularly on the prestigious lakes of Rosseau, Muskoka and Joseph.

The shops and restaurants in the Yonge and Lawrence area, are well patronized by Lawrence Park residents. This shopping district includes some fashion stores, a plethora of nail salons, barber shops, hair salons, 2 Dollaramas, bakeries, gourmet dining, casual restaurants and coffee shops.

Notable institutions located in or adjacent to Lawrence Park are the Rosedale Golf Club, and The Granite Club.

=== Homes ===
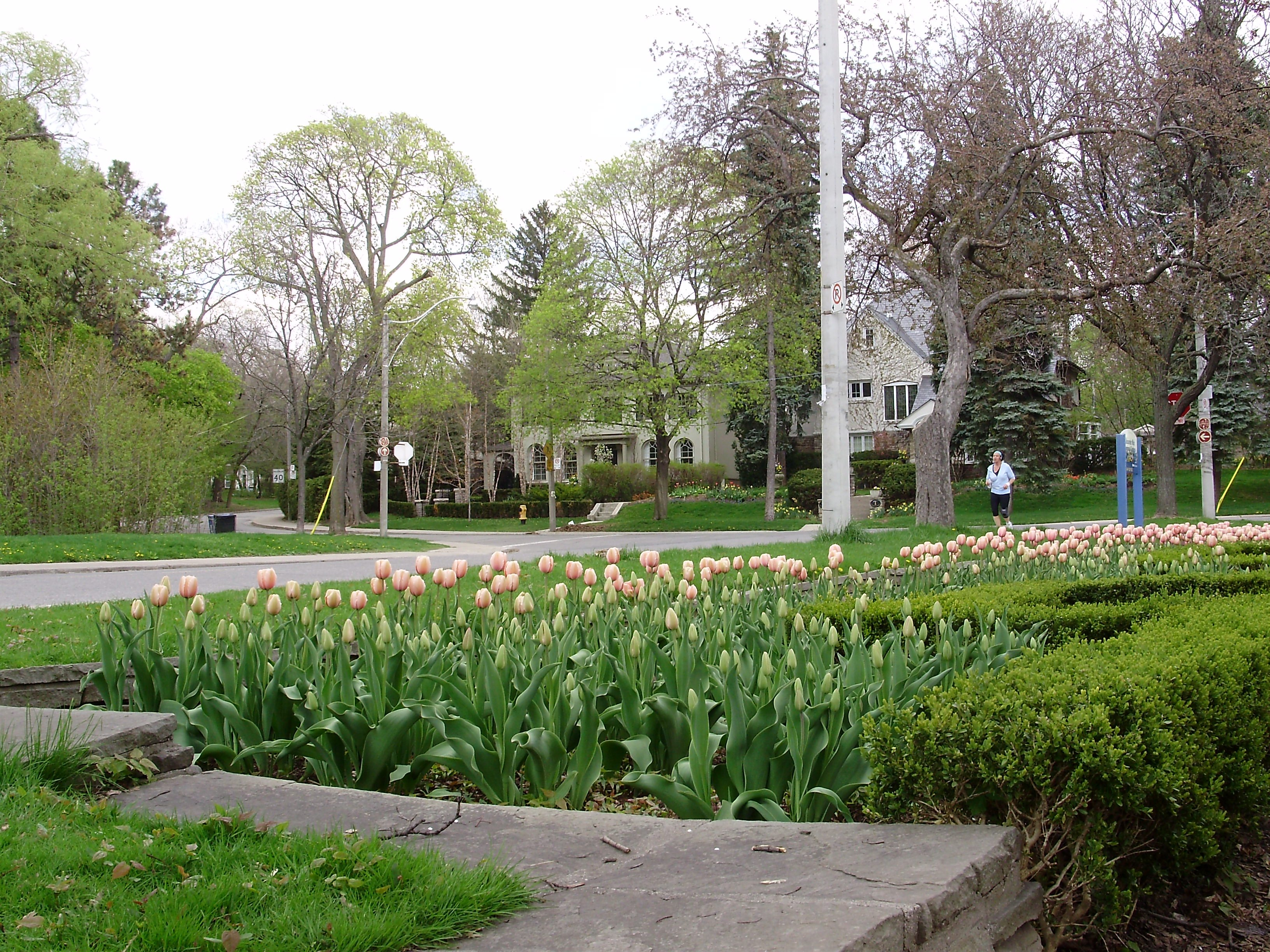
View of homes from Alexander Muir Gardens

Lawrence Park's houses include a variety of architectural styles including English Cottage, Tudor Revival, Georgian and Colonial style designs. Most of these homes were built between 1910 and the late 1940s. For the last few years parts of Lawrence Park have been redeveloped with larger houses which do not match the scale of the original housing in the neighborhood.

In the first part of 2011, the average resale house price in the neighborhood was $2,421,036, higher than any Toronto neighborhood other than the Bridle Path.

The Lawrence Park Ratepayers Association (LPRA) has been active for several decades. Its mandate is to promote all matters regarding the welfare of Lawrence Park and its preservation as a residential park. The LPRA serves the residents of the portion of Lawrence Park that falls within the old City of Toronto - an area bounded by Lawrence Avenue East, Yonge Street, Blythwood Road and St. Ives. Its annual newsletter and website provide information about activities and issues in the neighbourhood.

== Education ==
=== Public ===
In Lawrence Park, secular English-oriented public schools are operated by the Toronto District School Board (TDSB). Publicly funded English-oriented separate schools are operated by the Toronto Catholic District School Board (TCDSB). In the City of Toronto, secular French-oriented public schools are provided by Conseil scolaire Viamonde, whereas French-oriented public Catholic schools are provided by Conseil scolaire catholique MonAvenir. However, neither of the French school boards operate a school in Lawrence Park.

The following public schools are located in or near Lawrence Park:

- Bedford Park Public School - 81 Ranleigh Avenue (TDSB)
- Blessed Sacrament Catholic School - 24 Bedford Park Boulevard (TCDSB)
- Blythwood Junior Public School - 2 Strathgowan Crescent (TDSB)
- Sunny View Junior and Senior Public School - 450 Blythwood Road (TDSB)

== Transportation ==
Most Lawrence Park residents are within walking distance of bus routes that run along Yonge Street, Mount Pleasant Road, Bayview Avenue and Lawrence Avenue. The Lawrence subway station, located at the intersection of Yonge and Lawrence, is part of the Yonge-University-Spadina line.

Both Bayview and Yonge Street connect to Highway 401 within a five- to ten-minute drive from Lawrence Park.

== Notable residents ==
- Beverly Thomson, national broadcaster and journalist
- Alexandra Beaton, actress and dancer
- Paul Beeston, former president of Major League Baseball and also former president of the Toronto Blue Jays
- Roberta Bondar, first Canadian female astronaut
- Isadore Sharp, Founder and Chairman of Four Seasons Hotels and Resorts
- Steve Stavro, late owner of the Toronto Maple Leafs
- John A. Tory, late Canadian lawyer and corporate executive, former president of The Woodbridge Company
- John Tory, Canadian businessman, former leader of the Progressive Conservative Party of Ontario, and former mayor of Toronto
- Karen Stintz, Toronto former City Councillor, representing Ward 16. Previous Chair of the Toronto Transit Commission.
