= Alexander Muir =

Canadian songwriter, poet, soldier and school headmaster

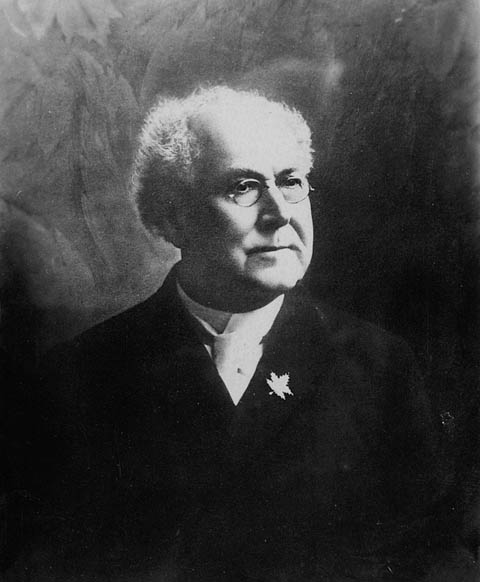
- Born: 5 April 1830; Lesmahagow, Scotland
- Died: 26 June 1906 (aged 76); Toronto, Ontario, Canada
- Education: Queen's College
- Occupations: Songwriter, poet, school headmaster
- Military career
- Allegiance: Canada
- Branch: Canadian Militia
- Service years: 1861–1867
- Rank: Private
- Unit: 2nd Queen's Own Rifles
- Conflicts: Fenian raids: Battle of Ridgeway

Alexander Muir (5 April 1830 – 26 June 1906) was a Canadian songwriter, poet, soldier, and school headmaster. He was the composer of "The Maple Leaf Forever", which he wrote in October 1867 to celebrate the Confederation of Canada.

== Early life ==
In 1833 Muir immigrated to Toronto, Ontario, from Lesmahagow, Scotland, where he grew up and he was educated by his father. Muir later studied at Queen's College, where he graduated in 1851.

== Career ==
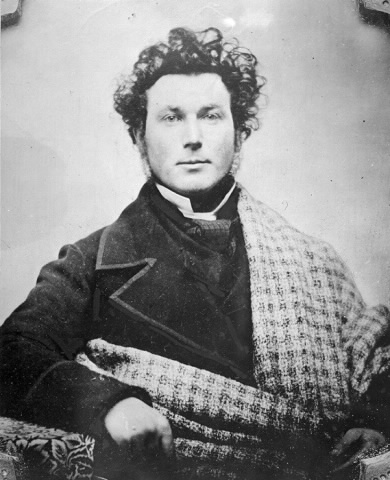
Alexander Muir at about 25 years of age, wearing his Scottish tartan

Muir taught in the Greater Toronto Area in such places as Scarborough (School Section # 6 in what is now Woburn.) and Toronto, as well as in Newmarket, Beaverton, and in then suburban areas as Parkdale and Leslieville, where he lived on Laing Avenue.

During the early 1870s, Alexander Muir was an elementary school teacher in Newmarket. When the cornerstone of the Christian Church in Newmarket was being laid on 25 June 1874, by the Governor General, Lord Dufferin, Muir brought his school choir to the event to sing his new composition "The Maple Leaf Forever", its first public performance.

From 1860 to 1870, he was principal of Leslieville School in Toronto. He was later (1888-1901) principal of Toronto's Alexander Muir/Gladstone Junior and Senior Public School (renamed after his death in his honour).

Muir was a noted Canadian Orangeman. He joined The Queen's Own Rifles of Canada in 1860 and served as Lieutenant in No. 10 (Highland) Company, fighting with them at the Battle of Ridgeway being wounded in the arm. He was later awarded the Canada General Service Medal. He also wrote "The Maple Leaf Forever" while he was serving with the regiment.

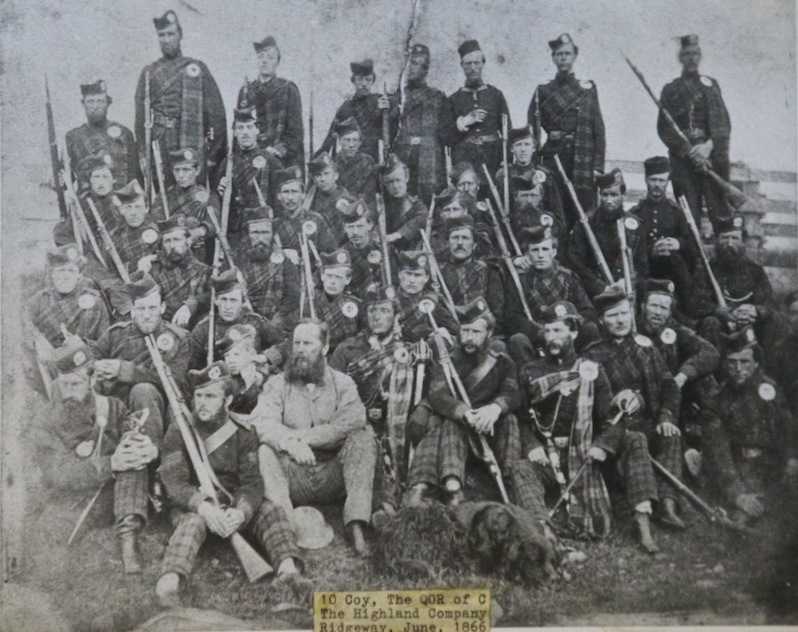
No.10 Company, Queens Own Rifles, after the Battle of Ridgeway 1866

== Music ==
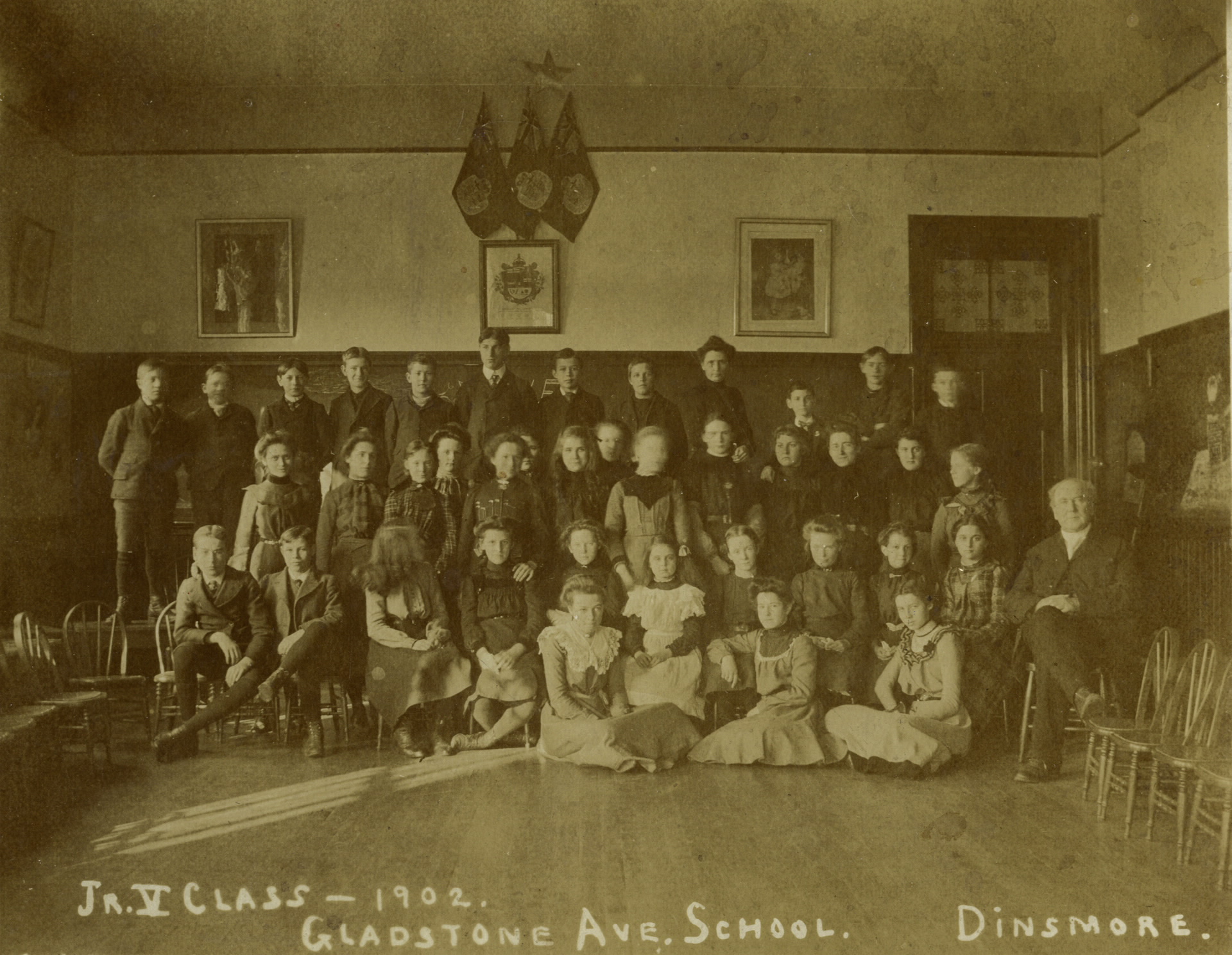
Gladstone School and students. Alexander Muir (principal) seated at right. 1902.

Although Muir's musical activities were on an amateur level, they were strongly emphasized along with athletics and patriotism during his teaching career. Muir wrote several songs about Canada during his career, including "Canada Forever" and "Young Canada Was Here", but his most enduring composition was "The Maple Leaf Forever", written in 1867, the year of Confederation. Muir originally wrote the poem for a patriotic poetry contest in Montreal, winning second prize. He then looked for an existing melody that would fit, a very common practice (it was not unusual for a poem printed in a journal to bear the statement "May be sung to the tune of..."). When he failed to find a suitable tune, Muir wrote the music himself.

== Death and legacy ==
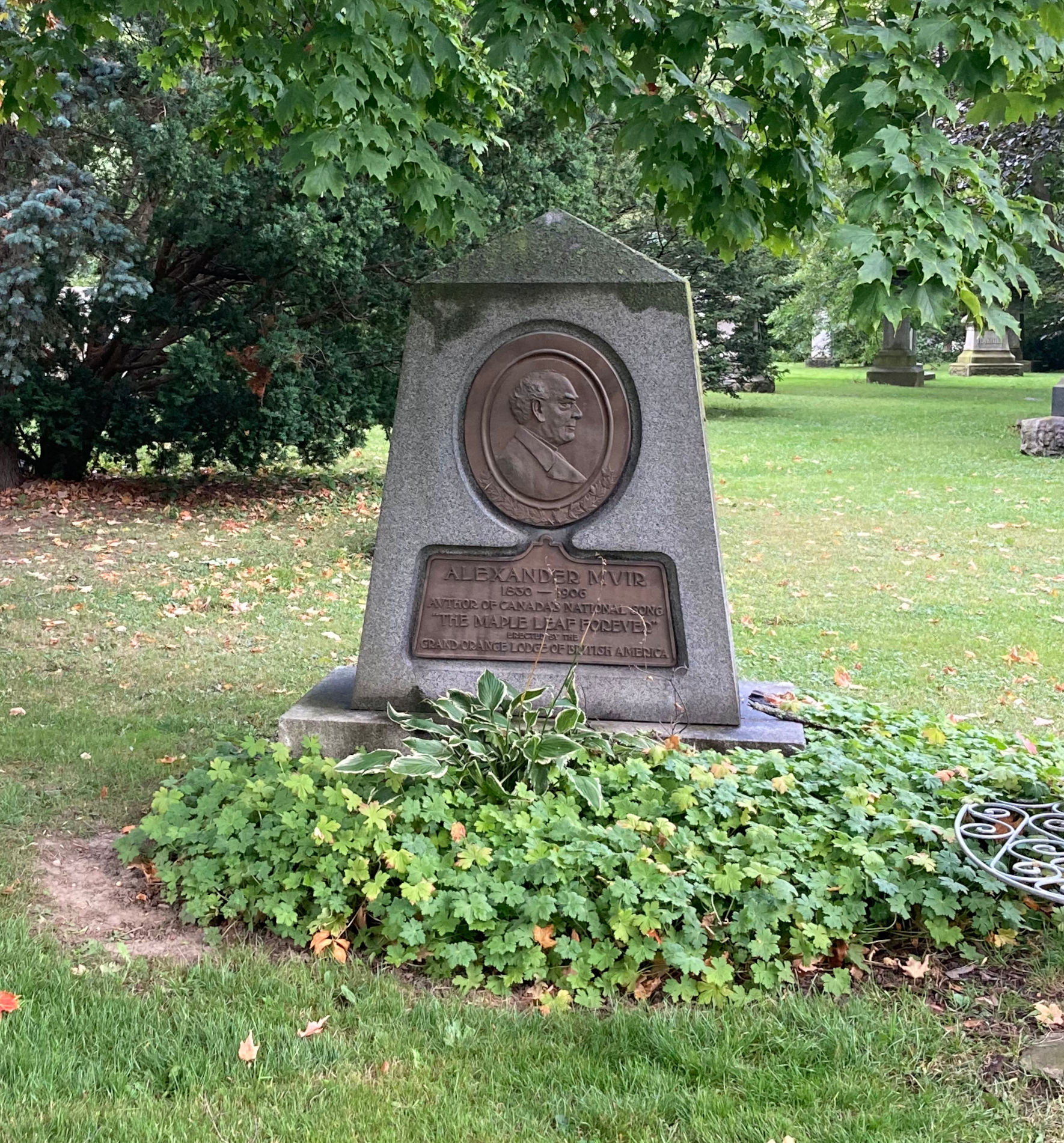
Muir's grave at Mount Pleasant Cemetery

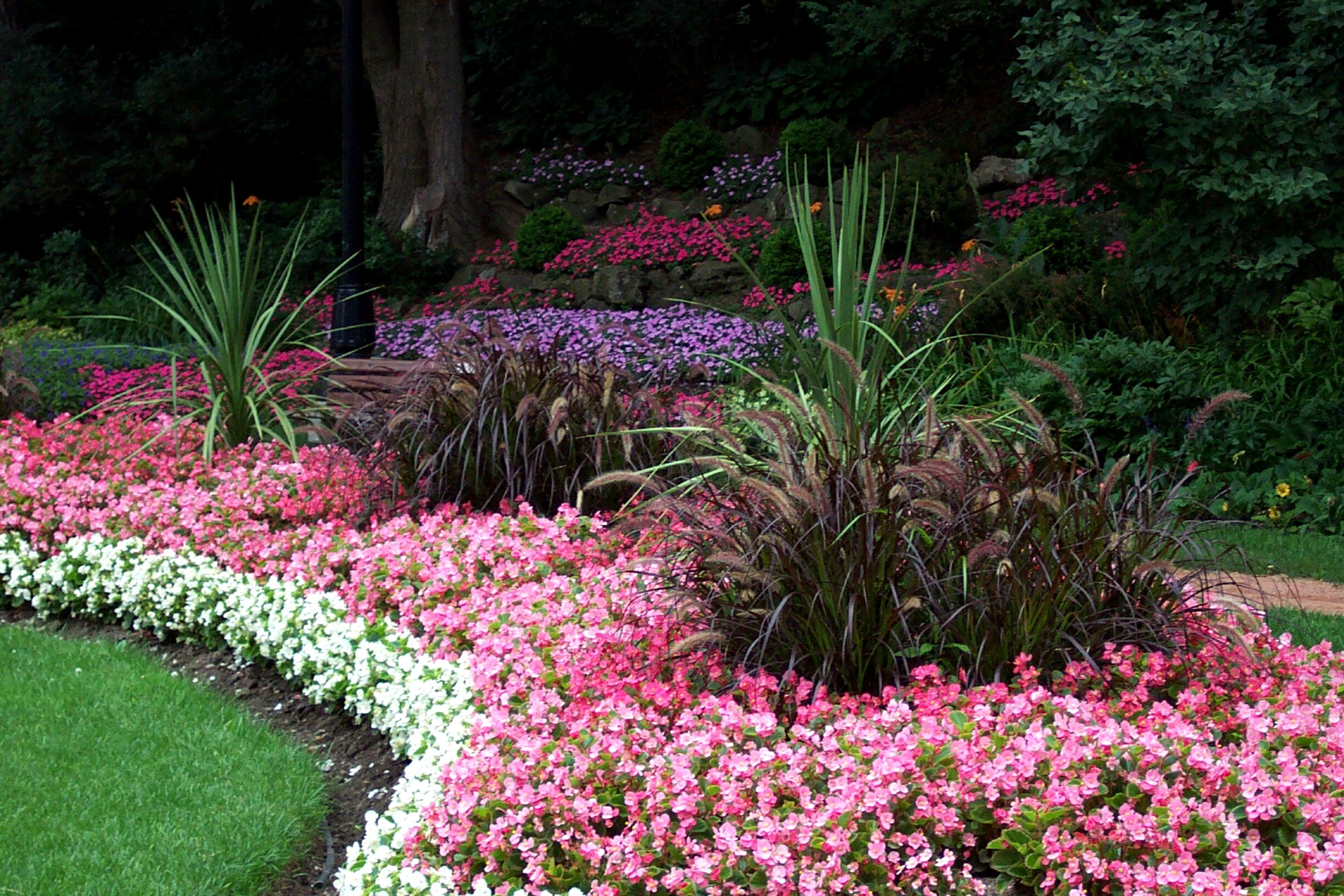
Flowerbeds in bloom in the Alexander Muir Memorial Gardens

Muir died unexpectedly in Toronto on June 26, 1906. He was buried at Mount Pleasant Cemetery.

A number of places have been named in his honor:

- Alexander Muir Memorial Gardens, a municipal park in Toronto, Ontario
- Alexmuir Park, a small park in Scarborough, Ontario
- Maple Leaf Forever Park, a municipal park in Toronto, Ontario, named after Muir's composition "The Maple Leaf Forever"
- Schools which have been named after him are:
  - Alexander Muir/Gladstone Ave Junior and Senior Public School in Toronto
  - Alexmuir Junior Public School in Scarborough
  - Alexander Muir Public School in Newmarket
  - formerly Alex Muir Public School in Sault Ste Marie which has now been repurposed into a 16 unit apartment building.
- Mount Muir in Alberta/British Columbia is named for him.
