= The Maple Leaf Forever =

Canadian patriotic song

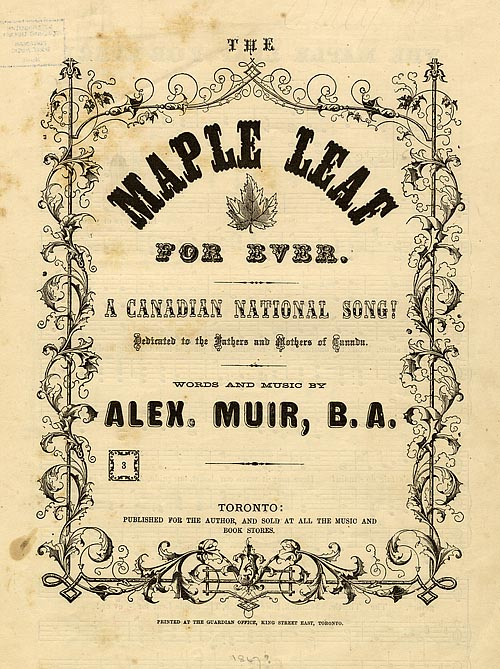
- Former national anthem of Canada
- Lyrics: Alexander Muir

"The Maple Leaf Forever" is a Canadian patriotic song with words and music by Alexander Muir, written in 1867, the year of Canadian Confederation. He wrote the work after serving with the Queen's Own Rifles of Toronto in defence of Canada against Fenian invaders in the 1866 Battle of Ridgeway.

== History ==
Edward Johnson (1928)
Tenor Edward Johnson singing "The Maple Leaf Forever"

Muir was said to have been inspired to write this song by a large maple tree which stood on his street in front of Maple Cottage, a house at Memory Lane and Laing Street in Toronto. The song became quite popular in English Canada and for many years served as an unofficial national anthem. Because of its strongly British perspective it was unpopular amongst French Canadians, and this prevented it from ever becoming an official state anthem, even though it was seriously considered for that role and was even used as a de facto state anthem in many instances.

The tree that inspired Muir's song fell during a windstorm on the night of July 19–20, 2013. Wood from the tree was used to make objects that will preserve its importance to Canadian culture, including the speaker's podium for Toronto City Council, and the Maple Leaf Forever Guitars. Residents have expressed their hope that the city will be able to start a new tree from one of the branches.

During the early 1870s, Alexander Muir was an elementary school teacher in Newmarket, north of Toronto.

It has been asserted that Muir's words, however, while certainly pro-British, were not anti-French, and he revised the lyrics of the first verse from "Here may it wave, our boast, our pride, and join in love together / The Thistle, Shamrock, Rose entwine" to "/ The Lily, Thistle, Shamrock, Rose, the Maple Leaf forever" – the thistle represents Scotland; the shamrock, Ireland; and the rose, England – adding the French symbol, the "lily", to the list. By doing so, Muir asserted that the British and French were united as Canadians under the Union Flag.

"The Maple Leaf Forever" is also the authorized regimental march of The Royal Westminster Regiment. Additionally, it is the regimental slow march of the Fort Henry Guard.

The song makes reference to James Wolfe capturing Quebec in 1759 during the Seven Years' War, and to the Battle of Queenston Heights and the Battle of Lundy's Lane during the War of 1812.

== Text and melody ==
In days of yore, from Britain's shore,
Wolfe, the dauntless hero, came
And planted firm Britannia's flag
On Canada's fair domain.
Here may it wave, our boast, our pride
And, joined in love together,
The thistle, shamrock, rose entwine (Note: Also sung: "The lily, thistle, shamrock, rose")
The Maple Leaf forever!
Chorus
The Maple Leaf, our emblem dear,
The Maple Leaf forever!
God save our King and Heaven bless
The Maple Leaf forever!

At Queenston Heights and Lundy's Lane,
Our brave fathers, side by side,
For freedom, homes and loved ones dear,
Firmly stood and nobly died;
And those dear rights which they maintained,
We swear to yield them never!
Our watchword evermore shall be
"The Maple Leaf forever!"
Chorus

Our fair Dominion now extends
From Cape Race to Nootka Sound;
May peace forever be our lot,
And plenteous store abound:
And may those ties of love be ours
Which discord cannot sever,
And flourish green o'er freedom's home
The Maple Leaf forever!
Chorus

On merry England's far famed land
May kind heaven sweetly smile,
God bless old Scotland evermore
and Ireland's Em'rald Isle!
And swell the song both loud and long
Till rocks and forest quiver!
God save our King and Heaven bless
The Maple Leaf forever!
Chorus

=== Alternative lyrics ===
CBC Radio's Metro Morning show in Toronto ran a contest to find new lyrics for the song in 1997. The contest was won by Romanian immigrant, mathematician, and now a songwriter, actor and poet, Vladimir Radian, who came to Canada in the 1980s. This version received its first full orchestral treatment on June 27, 1997, at a concert by the Toronto Symphony Orchestra.

The new version removed all references to British-Canadian heritage, but added a special reference to Quebec's provincial symbol, the fleur-de-lis.

Padre G. E. Benton, a former Canadian army chaplain, also wrote a revised version.

The Canadian vocal harmony trio "Finest Kind" (Ian Robb, Ann Downey and Shelley Posen) recorded "The Maple Leaf Forever" on their 2003 CD "Silks & Spices". This version, with new words co-written by Posen and Robb and harmony arrangement by the trio, was sung at the ceremonial planting in Ottawa of two silver maple seedlings: direct descendants of the tree which is thought to have inspired Alexander Muir to write the original song in 1867. The ceremony occurred on November 2, 2014, and was attended by several local dignitaries and military veterans. The words acknowledge the Aboriginal, French, English and "new Canadian" contributions to the evolution of Canada, and highlight Canada's more recent military role as peacekeepers "where hate and war divide". The second verse also references John McCrae's iconic First World War poem "In Flanders Fields".

During the final game of the Toronto Maple Leafs at their former home arena, Maple Leaf Gardens in Toronto, Anne Murray sang another version (modified from Radian's version) of "The Maple Leaf Forever". This version was also used by Michael Bublé during the 2010 Winter Olympics closing ceremony.

== See also ==
- Canadian patriotic music
- Music of Canada
