= Lawrence station (Toronto) =

Toronto subway station

Lawrence
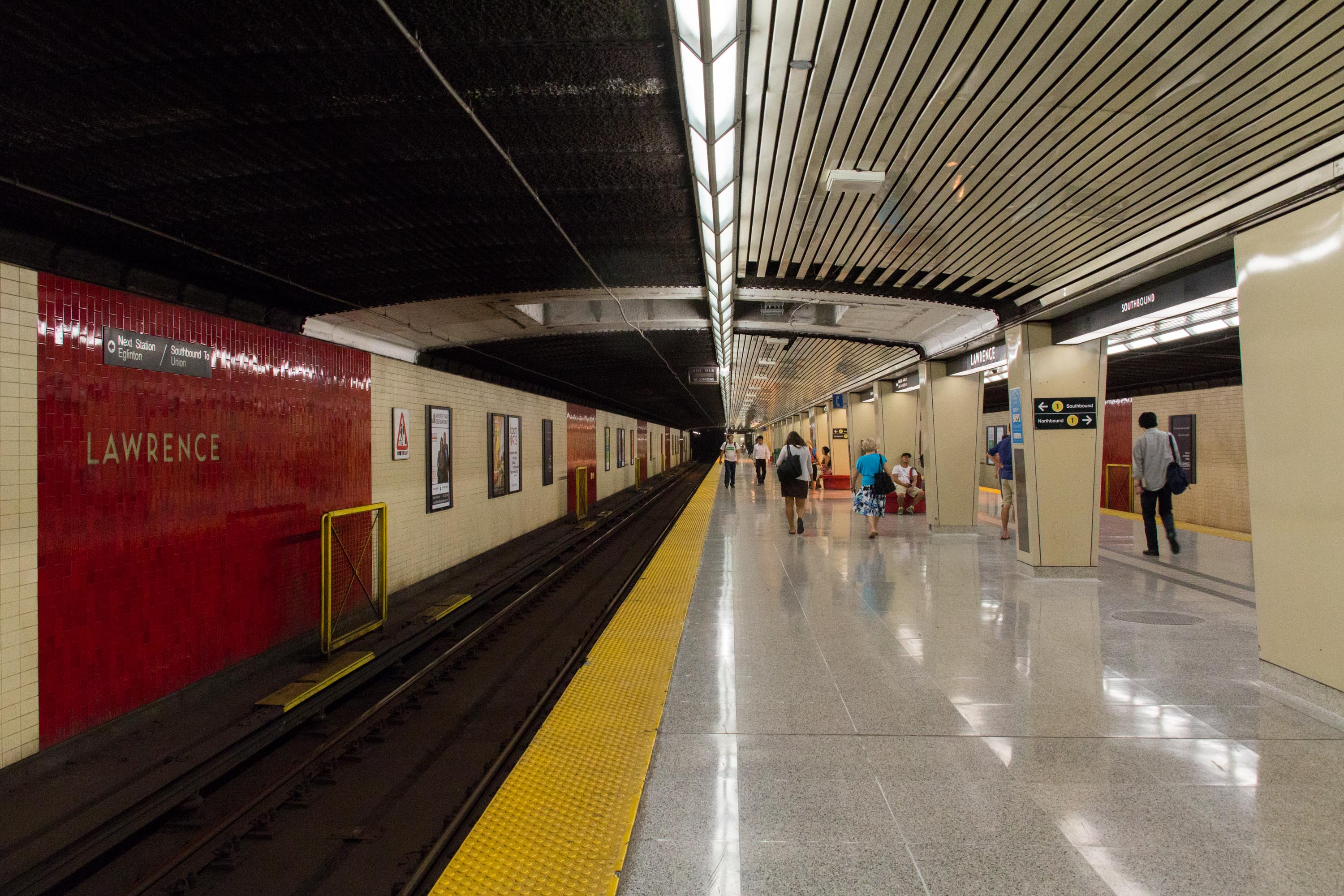

General information
- Location: 3101 Yonge Street; Toronto, Ontario; Canada
- Coordinates: 43°43′35″N 79°24′09″W
- Platforms: Centre platform
- Tracks: 2
- Connections: TTC buses: 11 Bayview; 52 Lawrence West; 97 Yonge; 162 Lawrence–Donway; 320 Yonge; 352 Lawrence West

Construction
- Structure type: Underground
- Accessible: Yes

Other information
- Website: Official station page

History
- Opened: March 31, 1973; 53 years ago

Passengers
- 2023–2024: 21,197
- Rank: 29 of 70

Services
Preceding station	Toronto Transit Commission	Following station
Eglinton towards Vaughan	Line 1 Yonge–University	York Mills towards Finch
Location

Lawrence is a subway station on Line 1 Yonge–University in Toronto, Ontario, Canada. It is located under Yonge Street at Lawrence Avenue, in the Bedford Park, Lawrence Park and Lytton Park neighbourhoods.

== Description ==
The station is on four levels, all the entrances to the station are at street level, the concourse and collector level is on the second level, the bus platform is on the third level, and the subway platform is on the lower level. Both the subway and bus levels have a centre platform.

Out of view from customers, there is an attic extending above and along the length of the subway platform. The attic contains ventilation equipment, a TTC substation and a city sewer pipe. There is a double crossover just south of the subway platforms.

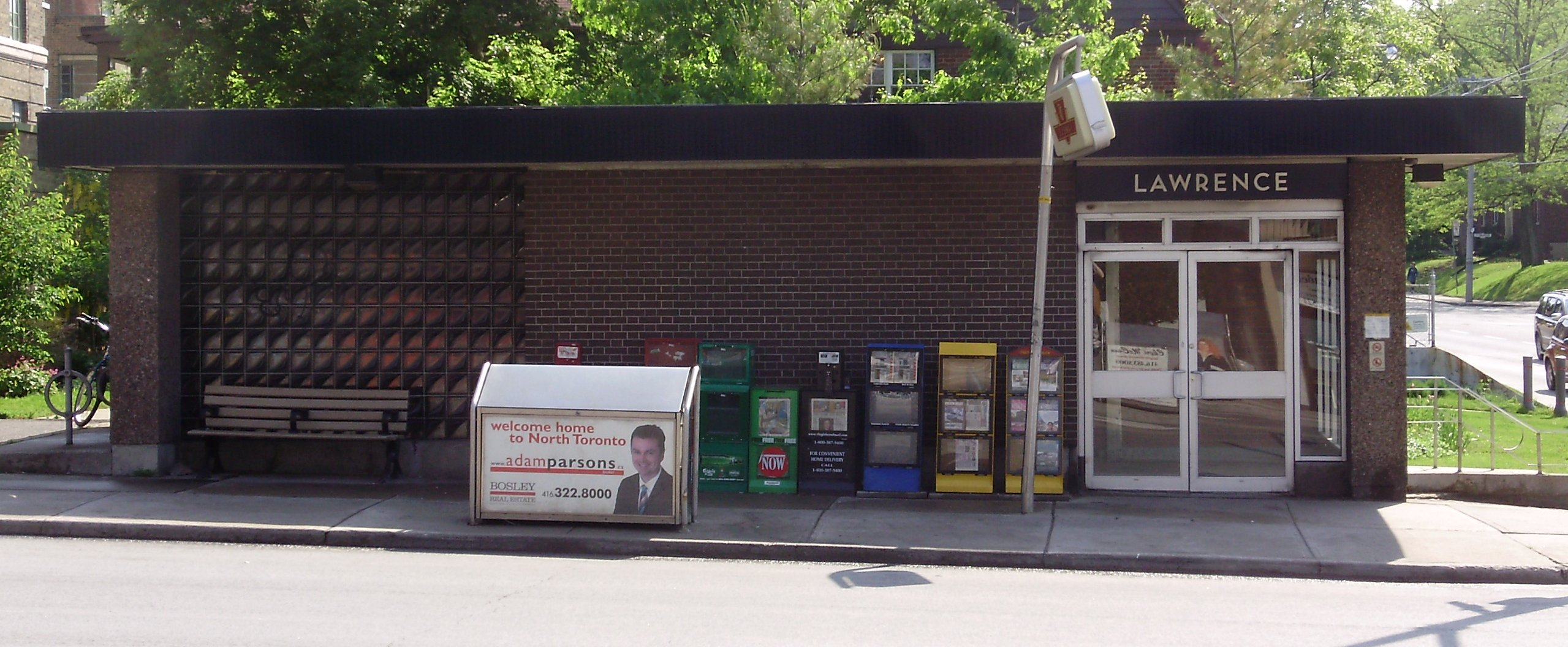
Entrance at the northeast corner of Lawrence Ave. and Yonge St.

There are four entrances to the station located in the surrounding area:

- Entrance on Lawrence Avenue, west of Yonge Street, leading to the south-side mezzanine level
- Entrance on Lawrence Avenue, east of Yonge Street, leading to the south-side mezzanine level
- Entrance via sidewalk staircase at Bedford Park Avenue, leading to the north-side mezzanine level
- Entrance via sidewalk staircase at Ranleigh Avenue, leading to the north-side mezzanine level

The south-side mezzanine leads down to the bus and subway levels. The unstaffed north-side mezzanine leads directly to the subway level.

== History ==
Lawrence station opened in 1973 as an intermediate stop between Eglinton, the former northern terminus of the Yonge line, and York Mills, which acted as a temporary terminus until the line was extended to Finch. Constructed using the cut-and-cover method, Lawrence is one of the deepest stations in the subway system. It was also the first station to have an underground bus terminal.

On April 23, 2007, TTC employee Antonio Almeida was killed in the tunnel just south of the station when a platform on his work car was dislodged.

In 2012, a series of renovations repaired the deteriorating concrete of the bus roadway and tunnel walls. Between the fourth quarter of 2012 and mid-2015, four high-capacity fire ventilation fans were installed at the station.

In 2015, the owner of the building at 3080 Yonge Street (at the northwest corner of Lawrence Avenue West) proposed to incorporate the TTC entrance at that corner into a renovation project for the building. The old TTC entrance building would be demolished; the renovated building would incorporate a new TTC entrance at ground level. The TTC requested that there be provision for an elevator. These renovations were carried out, and the renovated TTC entrance was opened.

== Easier access enhancements works ==
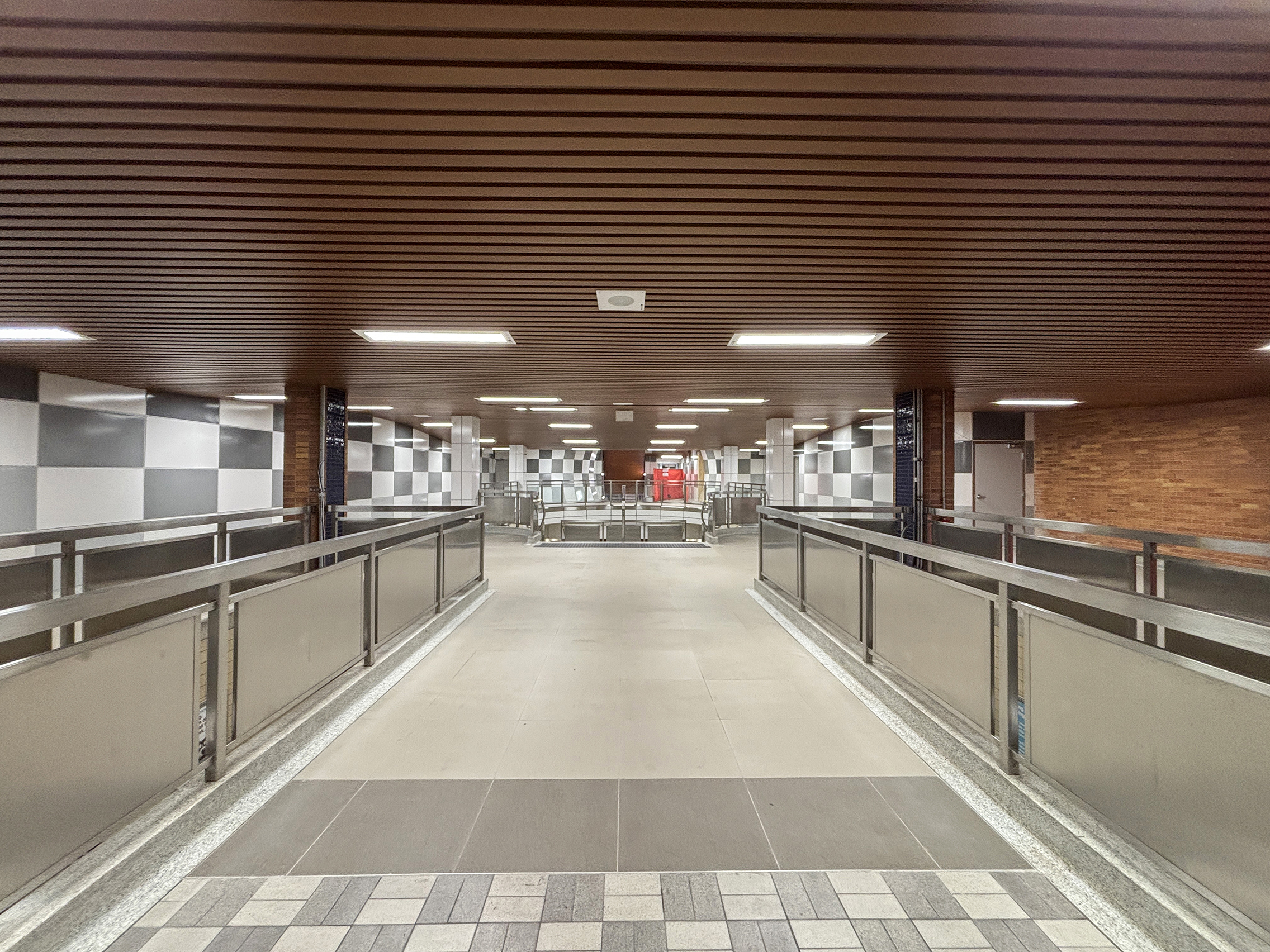
South concourse after access enhancements works in September 2025

By mid-2022, work had begun to make Lawrence station accessible. The project entailed the addition of two elevators, one from street level to the concourse level and a second from the concourse to the bus and subway levels. A new stairway would be added from the concourse to the subway platform. Signage and wayfinding would be improved throughout the station. Once the project is completed, the station will have a fifth entrance to house the elevator from street level to the concourse; it will be located on the north side of a Tim Hortons outlet, a few doors north of the existing entrance at the northwest corner of Yonge Street and Lawrence Avenue. The project required partial closures within the station. In November 2023, the underground bus terminal was closed, resulting in the diversion of buses from Lawrence Avenue West to Eglinton station via Avenue Road, and buses from Lawrence Avenue East to the Roe Loop at Roe Avenue and Avenue Road. In July 2024, the main entrances at the south side of the station were closed, limiting station access to the northern secondary entrances. On August 31, 2025, the bus terminal and south side entrances were reopened. Elevators went into service in December 2025, rendering the station accessible. Minor work is expected to be completed through the second quarter of 2026.

== Nearby landmarks ==
- Parks that run through Chatsworth and Blythwood ravines from Chatsworth Drive and Cheritan Avenue to Bayview Avenue.
- Alexander Muir Memorial Gardens
- Toronto Public Library Locke Branch
- Lawrence Park Collegiate Institute

== Surface connections ==
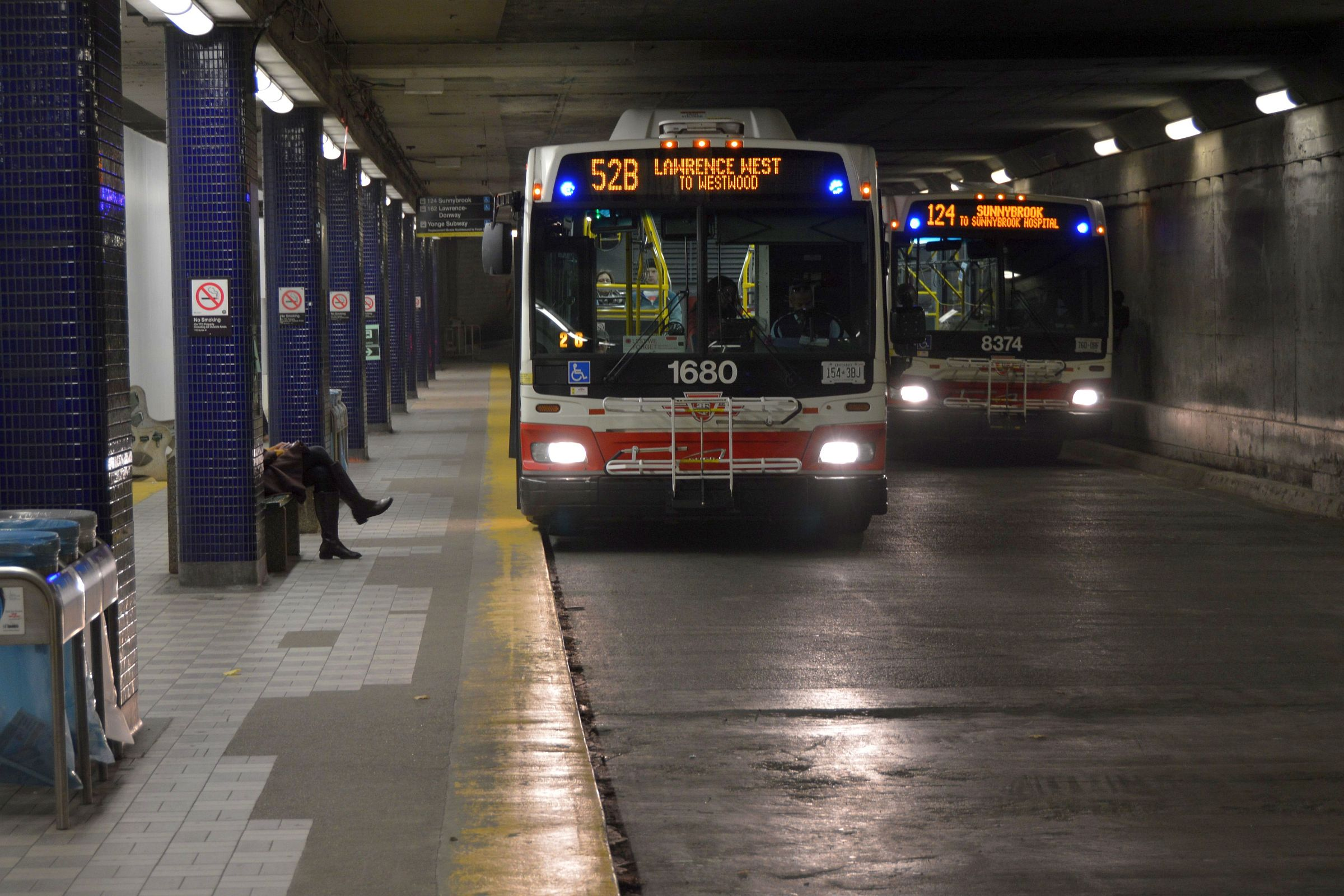
Underground bus platforms

Buses enter the station counter to the normal traffic directions so that bus doors will face the centre bus platform.

TTC routes serving the station include:

Bay number	Route	Name	Additional information
1	952	Lawrence West Express	Westbound to Pearson Airport via Dixon Road
1	52F	Lawrence West	Westbound to Royal York Road
2	52A	Lawrence West	Westbound to Pearson Airport via Dixon Road
2	52B	Lawrence West	Westbound to Westwood Square Mall in Mississauga via Dixon and Airport Roads
2	52D	Lawrence West	Westbound to McNaughton Avenue in Mississauga via Dixon and Airport Roads
3	Wheel-Trans		
4	11B	Bayview	Southbound to Davisville station via Sunnybrook Hospital
4	52F	Lawrence West	Eastbound to Sunnybrook Hospital
5	162	Lawrence–Donway	Eastbound to Don Valley station
N/A	97A	Yonge	Northbound to Steeles Avenue and southbound to St. Clair station (On-street stop outside station)
N/A	97B	Yonge	Northbound to Steeles Avenue via Yonge Boulevard and southbound to St. Clair station via Yonge Boulevard (On-street stop outside station)
N/A	320	Yonge	Blue Night service; northbound to Steeles Avenue and southbound to Queens Quay (On-street stop outside station)
N/A	352	Lawrence West	Blue Night service; eastbound to Sunnybrook Hospital and westbound to Pearson Airport (On-street stop outside station)

== George Milbrandt Parkette ==
George Milbrandt Parkette is located at the northeast corner of Yonge Street and Lawrence Avenue East, and shares the small rectangular plot of land with the Lawrence station entrance at that location. At the request of George Milbrandt, acting on behalf of the Bedford Park Residents' Association, the Toronto City Council created the park in 1998. In 1999, the City named the parkette after Milbrandt, who had promoted the parkette's creation for 25 years. The parkette has simple landscaping including shade trees, park benches, grading and grass.
