= Lawrence Township, Itasca County, Minnesota =

Lawrence Township, Minnesota
- Township
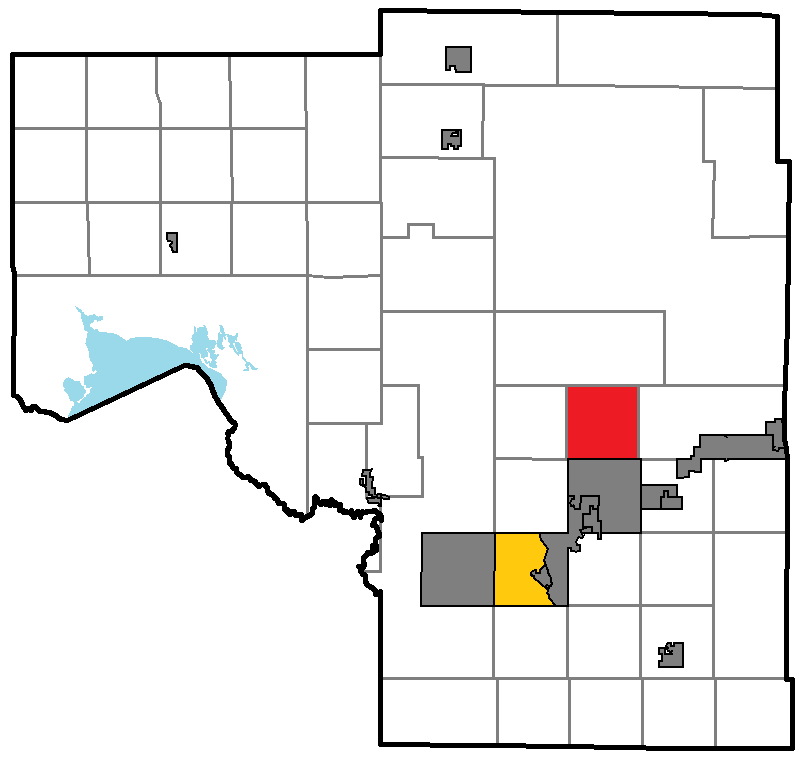
- Location of Lawrence Township, within Itasca County, Minnesota
- Coordinates: 47°24′38″N 93°23′7″W
- Country: United States
- State: Minnesota
- County: Itasca

Area
  - Total: 36.0 sq mi (93.3 km^{2})
  - Land: 33.7 sq mi (87.4 km^{2})
  - Water: 2.3 sq mi (5.9 km^{2})
- Elevation: 1,302 ft (397 m)

Population (2020)
  - Total: 488
  - Density: 14.5/sq mi (5.58/km^{2})
- Time zone: UTC-6 (Central (CST))
  - Summer (DST): UTC-5 (CDT)
- ZIP code: 55786
- Area code: 218
- FIPS code: 27-35900
- GNIS feature ID: 0664736

Lawrence Township is a township in Itasca County, Minnesota, United States. The population was 488 at the 2020 census.

== Geography ==
According to the United States Census Bureau, the township has a total area of 36.0 square miles (93 km^{2}), of which 33.7 square miles (87 km^{2}) is land and 2.3 square miles (6.0 km^{2}), or 6.33%, is water.

== Demographics ==
As of the census of 2000, there were 441 people, 185 households, and 126 families living in the township. The population density was 13.1 inhabitants per square mile (5.1/km^{2}). There were 271 housing units at an average density of 8.0 per square mile (3.1/km^{2}). The racial makeup of the township was 96.60% White, 2.04% Native American, 0.23% from other races, and 1.13% from two or more races. Hispanic or Latino of any race were 0.23% of the population.

There were 185 households, out of which 24.9% had children under the age of 18 living with them, 60.0% were married couples living together, 3.8% had a female householder with no husband present, and 31.4% were non-families. 25.9% of all households were made up of individuals, and 13.5% had someone living alone who was 65 years of age or older. The average household size was 2.38 and the average family size was 2.80.

In the township the population was spread out, with 21.1% under the age of 18, 6.3% from 18 to 24, 24.7% from 25 to 44, 30.8% from 45 to 64, and 17.0% who were 65 years of age or older. The median age was 43 years. For every 100 females, there were 109.0 males. For every 100 females age 18 and over, there were 101.2 males.

The median income for a household in the township was $34,821, and the median income for a family was $38,000. Males had a median income of $34,643 versus $19,375 for females. The per capita income for the township was $15,256. About 6.7% of families and 14.8% of the population were below the poverty line, including 9.8% of those under age 18 and 8.2% of those age 65 or over.
