= Lawrence County =

Lawrence County is the name of eleven counties in the United States. All but the one in South Dakota were named for the U.S. naval hero of the War of 1812, Captain James Lawrence, with the one in Pennsylvania doing this indirectly as it's named after the ship named in his honor, the USS Lawrence.

- Lawrence County, Alabama
- Lawrence County, Arkansas
- Lawrence County, Illinois
- Lawrence County, Indiana
- Lawrence County, Kentucky
- Lawrence County, Mississippi
- Lawrence County, Missouri
- Lawrence County, Ohio
- Lawrence County, Pennsylvania
- Lawrence County, South Dakota
- Lawrence County, Tennessee

== See also ==
- St. Lawrence County, New York
