= Lawrence Township, Grant County, Minnesota =

Township in Minnesota, United States

Lawrence Township
- Township
- Location within the state of Minnesota Lawrence Township (the United States)
- Coordinates: 46°3′16″N 96°12′42″W
- Country: United States
- State: Minnesota
- County: Grant

Area
  - Total: 35.8 sq mi (92.8 km^{2})
  - Land: 35.1 sq mi (90.8 km^{2})
  - Water: 0.77 sq mi (2.0 km^{2})
- Elevation: 1,030 ft (314 m)

Population (2000)
  - Total: 96
  - Density: 2.8/sq mi (1.1/km^{2})
- Time zone: UTC-6 (Central (CST))
  - Summer (DST): UTC-5 (CDT)
- FIPS code: 27-35882
- GNIS feature ID: 0664735

Lawrence Township is a township in Grant County, Minnesota, United States. The population was 96 at the 2000 census.

Lawrence Township was organized in 1880, and named after St. Lawrence County, New York, the native home of a share of the early settlers.

== Geography ==
According to the United States Census Bureau, the township has a total area of 35.8 square miles (93 km^{2}), of which 35.1 square miles (91 km^{2}) is land and 0.8 square miles (2.1 km^{2}) (2.18%) is water.

== Demographics ==
As of the census of 2000, there were 96 people, 39 households, and 24 families residing in the township. The population density was 2.7 inhabitants per square mile (1.0/km^{2}). There were 41 housing units at an average density of 1.2 per square mile (0.46/km^{2}). The racial makeup of the township was 97.92% White, 1.04% African American, and 1.04% from two or more races.

There were 39 households, out of which 28.2% had children under the age of 18 living with them, 59.0% were married couples living together, 2.6% had a female householder with no husband present, and 35.9% were non-families. 30.8% of all households were made up of individuals, and 15.4% had someone living alone who was 65 years of age or older. The average household size was 2.46 and the average family size was 3.16.

In the township the population was spread out, with 27.1% under the age of 18, 5.2% from 18 to 24, 19.8% from 25 to 44, 29.2% from 45 to 64, and 18.8% who were 65 years of age or older. The median age was 44 years. For every 100 females, there were 113.3 males. For every 100 females age 18 and over, there were 105.9 males.

The median income for a household in the township was $47,500, and the median income for a family was $70,313. Males had a median income of $35,000 versus $36,250 for females. The per capita income for the township was $26,071. There were no families and 2.7% of the population living below the poverty line, including no under eighteens and none of those over 64.
