= St. Lawrence's Church =

St. Laurence's Church or Saint Lawrence's Church may refer to:

== Australia ==
- Christ Church St Laurence, Sydney

== Austria ==
- Basilica of St. Lawrence, Enns

== Brazil ==
- Church of Saint Lawrence (Itaparica)

== China ==
- St. Lawrence's Church, Macau

== Denmark ==
- St. Lawrence's Church, Roskilde Roman Catholic church in Roskilde
- St. Lawrence's Church, former church in Roskilde og which only the tower survuces

== Finland ==
- Church of St. Lawrence, Vantaa
- Church of St. Lawrence, Lohja
- St Lawrence's Church, Eckerö

== France ==
- St. Lawrence Church, Saint-Laurent-du-Maroni, French Guiana
- Saint-Laurent, Paris

== Germany ==
- St. Laurentii, Itzehoe
- St. Lorenz Basilica, Kempten, Bavaria
- St. Lorenz, Nuremberg, Bavaria

== India ==
- St. Lawrence Shrine Basilica, Karkala, Karnataka

== Italy ==
- San Lorenzo Martire, Lazzate, Lombardy
- San Lorenzo fuori le mura, Rome

== Liechtenstein ==
- Church of St Laurentius, Schaan, Schaan

== Malta ==
- Saint Lawrence's Church, Vittoriosa, Birgu

== Netherlands ==
- Grote or Sint-Laurenskerk (Rotterdam)
- Grote or Sint-Laurenskerk (Alkmaar)

== Pakistan ==
- St. Lawrence's Church, Karachi

== Philippines ==
- Parish Church of St. Lawrence of Rome, Deacon and Martyr (Balagtas, Bulacan)
- St. Lawrence the Martyr Parish Church (Balangiga, Eastern Samar)
- St. Lawrence the Deacon Parish Church (Prieto Diaz, Sorsogon)

== Poland ==
- St. Lawrence's Church, Warsaw

== Portugal ==
- Church of São Lourenço (Almancil)

== Sri Lanka ==
- St. Lawrence's Church, Wellawatte

== Sweden ==
- St. Lawrence's Church, Söderköping

== Ukraine ==
- St. Lawrence's Church, Zhovkva

== United Kingdom ==
=== England ===
Bedfordshire

- Church of St Lawrence, Wymington

Berkshire

- St Laurence's Church, Reading
- St Laurence's Church, Upton-cum-Chalvey, Slough

Birmingham

- St Lawrence's Church, Duddeston
- St Laurence's Church, Northfield

Buckinghamshire

- St Lawrence's Church, Broughton
- St Lawrence's Church, West Wycombe
- St Laurence's Church, Winslow

Cambridgeshire

- St Laurence's Church, Cambridge
- St Lawrence Parish Church, Foxton, Cambridgeshire

Cheshire

- St Laurence's Church, Frodsham
- St Lawrence's Church, Over Peover
- St Lawrence's Church, Stoak

City of London

- St Lawrence Jewry

Cumbria

- St Lawrence's Church, Appleby
- St Lawrence's Church, Crosby Ravensworth
- St Laurence's Church, Morland

Derbyshire

- St Lawrence's Church, Eyam
- St Laurence's Church, Long Eaton
- St Lawrence's Church, North Wingfield
- St Lawrence's Church, Walton-on-Trent
- St Lawrence's Church, Whitwell

East Sussex

- St Laurence's Church, Guestling

Essex

- St Laurence's Church, Blackmore
- St Laurence and All Saints Church, Eastwood

Gloucestershire

- St Lawrence Church, Lechlade
- St Lawrence's Church, Sandhurst
- Church of St Laurence, Wyck Rissington

Greater London

- St Lawrence Church, Morden
- Church of St Laurence, Upminster

Greater Manchester

- St Lawrence's Church, Denton

Hampshire

- Church of St Lawrence, Alton
- St Lawrence's Church, Weston Patrick
- St Lawrence Church, Winchester

Kent

- St Lawrence's Church, Mereworth
- St Laurence's Church, Ramsgate

Isle of Wight

- St Lawrence's Church, St Lawrence

Lancashire

- St Lawrence's Church, Barton
- St Laurence's Church, Chorley
- St Laurence's Church, Morecambe

Lincolnshire

- St Lawrence Church, Bardney
- St Lawrence's Church, Lincoln
- St Lawrence's Church, Snarford

Norfolk

- St Laurence's Church, Norwich
- St Lawrence Church, South Walsham

Northamptonshire

- Church of St Laurence, Stanwick
- St Lawrence's Church, Long Buckby

Northumberland

- Church of St Lawrence, Warkworth

North Yorkshire

- Church of St Lawrence, Kirby Sigston
- St Laurence's Church, Scalby
- St Lawrence's Church, York

Nottinghamshire

- St Laurence's Church, Gonalston
- St Lawrence's Church, Gotham
- St. Laurence's Church, Norwell
- St. Lawrence's Church, Thorpe

Oxfordshire

- St Laurence's Church, Combe Longa

Shropshire

- St Laurence's Church, Church Stretton
- St Laurence's Church, Ludlow

Somerset

- Church of St Laurence, East Harptree
- Church of St Lawrence, Lydeard St Lawrence
- Church of St Lawrence, Priddy
- Church of St Lawrence, Rode
- Church of St Lawrence, Stanton Prior

Staffordshire

- St Lawrence's Church, Coppenhall
- St Lawrence's Church, Gnosall

Suffolk

- St Lawrence Church, Ipswich

Surrey

- Church of St Lawrence, Chobham

Warwickshire

- St Lawrence's Church, Oxhill

West Midlands

- St Laurence Church, Meriden

Wiltshire

- St Laurence's Church, Bradford-on-Avon
- Church of St Laurence, Downton
- Church of St Laurence, Hilmarton
- St Lawrence, Stratford-sub-Castle, Salisbury

Worcestershire

- St Lawrence's Church, Evesham

== United States ==
- St. Lawrence Catholic Church (Otter Creek, Iowa)
- St. Lawrence Arts Center in Portland, Maine
- Minor Basilica of St. Lawrence the Deacon and Martyr in Asheville, North Carolina
- St. Lawrence Church (Cincinnati), Ohio
- St. Laurence Church in Upper Darby Township, Pennsylvania
- St. Lawrence Catholic Church (Stangelville, Wisconsin)

== See also ==
- San Lorenzo (disambiguation)#Churches
- Basilica of St. Lawrence (disambiguation)
- St. Lawrence Cathedral (disambiguation)
- Saint Lawrence (disambiguation)
