= San Lorenzo =

San Lorenzo is the Italian and Spanish name for Saint Lawrence, the 3rd-century Christian martyr, and may refer to:

== Places ==
=== Argentina ===
- San Lorenzo, Santa Fe
- San Lorenzo Department, Chaco
- Villa San Lorenzo, town and municipality in Salta Province
- Monte San Lorenzo, a mountain on the border between Argentina and Chile

=== Bolivia ===
- San Lorenzo, Tarija

=== Colombia ===
- San Lorenzo, Nariño

=== Croatia ===
- Lovrečica, also called San Lorenzo, a village in Umag

=== Costa Rica ===
- San Lorenzo, a district in Heredia Province

=== Dominican Republic ===
- San Lorenzo de Mao in Mao, Dominican Republic

=== Ecuador ===
- San Lorenzo, Ecuador, a sea port
- San Lorenzo Canton, Esmeraldas Province

=== El Salvador ===
- San Lorenzo, Ahuachapán
- San Lorenzo, San Vicente

=== France ===
- San-Lorenzo, a village in Corsica

=== Guatemala ===
- San Lorenzo, San Marcos
- San Lorenzo, Suchitepéquez

=== Honduras ===
- San Lorenzo, Valle

=== Italy ===
- San Lorenzo, Arcidosso, a village in the province of Grosseto
- San Lorenzo (Naples), a neighborhood in central Naples
- San Lorenzo, Calabria, a municipality in the province of Reggio Calabria
- San Lorenzo alle Corti, a village in the province of Pisa
- San Lorenzo al Mare, a municipality in the province of Imperia
- San Lorenzo a Pagnatico, a village in the province of Pisa
- San Lorenzo del Vallo, a municipality in the province of Cosenza
- San Lorenzo, Venice, church building in Italy
- San Lorenzo in Banale, a municipality in Trentino
- San Lorenzo in Campo, a municipality in the province of Pesaro and Urbino
- San Lorenzo (Bognanco), in the province of Verbano Cusio Ossola
- Colonne di San Lorenzo, Roman ruins in Milan
- Quartiere San Lorenzo, part of the Third Municipality of Rome
- San Lorenzo Bellizzi, a municipality in Cosenza
- San Lorenzo Isontino, a municipality in Gorizia
- San Lorenzo Maggiore, a municipality and town in Benevento
- San Lorenzo Nuovo, a municipality in Viterbo
- St. Lorenzen, a municipality in South Tyrol, in the Italian region Trentino-Alto Adige/Südtirol

=== Mexico ===
- San Lorenzo River (Mexico)
- San Lorenzo, Chihuahua
- San Lorenzo, Oaxaca
- San Lorenzo Albarradas, Oaxaca
- San Lorenzo Cacaotepec, Oaxaca
- San Lorenzo Cuaunecuiltitla, Oaxaca
- San Lorenzo Texmelucan, Oaxaca
- San Lorenzo Victoria, Oaxaca
- San Lorenzo Tenochtitlán, an ancient center of the Olmec culture, in Veracruz

=== Nicaragua ===
- San Lorenzo, Boaco

=== Panama ===
- Fort San Lorenzo, Colón
- San Lorenzo, Chiriquí

=== Paraguay ===
- San Lorenzo, Paraguay, a satellite city to the east of Asunción

=== Peru ===
- San Lorenzo Island, Peru, an island in the Pacific off the coast of Callao
- San Lorenzo, Loreto
- San Lorenzo, San Lorenzo District, Jauja Province
- San Lorenzo District, Jauja

=== Philippines ===
- San Lorenzo, Guimaras
- San Lorenzo, San Pablo
- San Lorenzo, a barangay in Makati

=== Puerto Rico ===
- San Lorenzo, Puerto Rico, a municipio
- San Lorenzo, Morovis, Puerto Rico, a barrio
- San Lorenzo barrio-pueblo, barrio and administrative center of San Lorenzo

=== Spain ===
- Sant Llorenç de la Muga, municipality in Catalonia, formerly San Lorenzo de la Muga
- San Lorenzo de El Escorial, a municipality in Madrid
- Mount San Lorenzo, a mountain near Ezcaray in Sierra de la Demanda, La Rioja
- San Lorenzo (Madrid Metro), a station on Line 4

=== United States ===
- San Lorenzo, California, a town in Alameda County
- San Lorenzo River, in California
- San Lorenzo Valley, in California
- San Lorenzo, New Mexico (disambiguation), several unincorporated communities

=== Fictional ===
- San Lorenzo (Vonnegut), a Caribbean island nation in Cat's Cradle by Kurt Vonnegut
- San Lorenzo, a Central American country in Hey Arnold!: The Jungle Movie
- San Lorenzo, a Mediterranean country in Leverage
- San Lorenzo, a town in The Adventures of Puss in Boots

== Churches ==
- Basilica di San Lorenzo (disambiguation)

=== Italy ===
- San Lorenzo, Brescia, a Baroque style, Roman Catholic church in Lombardy
- San Lorenzo, Budrio, a Roman Catholic parish church in Bologna, Emilia Romagna
- San Lorenzo, Carmignano, a romanesque-style, Roman Catholic rural parish church in Prato, Tuscany
- San Lorenzo, Civitella del Tronto, a Renaissance-style Roman Catholic parish church in Teramo, Abruzzo
- San Lorenzo, Florence, one of the largest churches of Florence
- San Lorenzo, Ghisalba, a neoclassical-style, Roman Catholic parish church in Bergamo, Lombardy
- San Lorenzo, Lodi, a Romanesque-style, Roman Catholic church in Lodi, Lombardy
- San Lorenzo, Melfi, a Baroque-style Roman Catholic church building in Potenza, Basilicata
- San Lorenzo, Mortara, a Gothic architecture, Roman Catholic Basilica church in Pavia, Lombardy
- San Lorenzo, Nirano, a Roman Catholic parish church in Fiorano Modenese, Emilia-Romagna
- San Lorenzo, Pazzaglio ed Uniti, a Roman Catholic parish church in Cremona, Lombardy
- San Lorenzo, San Lorenzo in Campo, a Roman Catholic basilica church in Pesaro e Urbino, Marche
- San Lorenzo, Sansepolcro, a Renaissance-style, Roman Catholic church in Arezzo, Tuscany
- San Lorenzo, Turin, a Baroque-style church in Turin
- San Lorenzo, Venice, a church building in the sestiere of Castello of Venice
- San Lorenzo Martire, Lazzate, a neoclassical-style, Roman Catholic parish church in Lombardy
- San Lorenzo Martire, Zogno, Lombardy
- San Lorenzo in Panisperna, a basilica in Rome
- San Lorenzo in Lucina, a church in Rome
- San Lorenzo in Miranda, a church and former temple in Rome
- San Lorenzo fuori le Mura, a basilica in Rome
- Genoa Cathedral or Cattedrale di San Lorenzo, a cathedral in Genoa
- Perugia Cathedral or Cattedrale di San Lorenzo, a cathedral in Perugia
- Basilica of San Lorenzo, Milan or Chiesa di San Lorenzo Maggiore, a church in Milan

=== Spain ===
- San Lorenzo, Córdoba, a church in Andalusia
- Iglesia de San Lorenzo, Toledo

== Sports ==
- San Lorenzo de Almagro, an Argentine football club based in Buenos Aires
- Club Sportivo San Lorenzo, a Paraguayan football club
- San Lorenzo F.C., a Honduran football club

== Other uses ==
- San Lorenzo (restaurant), an Italian restaurant in London
- San Lorenzo (Vonnegut), a fictional country in the novel Cat's Cradle by Kurt Vonnegut
- Sanlorenzo, an Italian yacht builder
- Battle of San Lorenzo, fought in 1813 between the United Provinces and the Royalists, in current Argentine territory
- Battle of San Lorenzo de la Muga, fought in 1784 between Spanish-Portuguese and French armies
- Operación San Lorenzo, a rescue of trapped Chilean miners in 2010
- "San Lorenzo march", a 1902 Argentine military march, celebrating the Battle of San Lorenzo
- "San Lorenzo", a song by Pat Metheny Group from Pat Metheny Group
- "San Lorenzo", a 2020 single by Alfa featuring Annalisa
- San Lorenzo Troop, a mounted squadron of the ceremonial Regiment of Mounted Grenadiers of the Argentine Army

== See also ==
- Lorenzo (disambiguation)
- San Lorenzo District (disambiguation)
- Río San Lorenzo (disambiguation)
- Saint Laurent (disambiguation)
- Saint Lawrence (disambiguation)
- San Lawrenz, a village in Gozo, Malta
- Sankt Lorenzen (disambiguation)
- São Lourenço (disambiguation)
