= Saint Lawrence (disambiguation) =

Saint Lawrence (225–258) was a Christian martyr.

Saint Lawrence or Saint Laurence may also refer to:

== Saints ==
- Lawrence of Novara (died c. 397), martyr and teacher
- Laurence of Siponto (died c. 545), bishop of Siponto
- Laurence the Illuminator (died 576), bishop of Spoleto
- Laurence of Canterbury (died 619), second Archbishop of Canterbury

=== Roman Catholic ===
- Lorcán Ua Tuathail (1128–1180), or Laurence O'Toole, Irish archbishop
- Lawrence Justinian (1381–1456), first Patriarch of Venice
- Lawrence of Brindisi (1559–1619), Doctor of the Church

==== Martyrs ====
===== Vietnamese Martyrs =====
- Lawrence Ngon, Vietnamese soldier and layman
- Lawrence Huong Van Nguyen, Vietnamese priest

===== 16 Martyrs of Japan =====
- Lorenzo Ruiz (1600–1637), Chinese-Filipino lay Dominican

== Buildings ==
- St. Lawrence Market North, a multi-purpose building in Toronto, Canada
- St. Lawrence Market South, a historic market in Toronto
- St. Lawrence Hall, a historic cultural hall in Toronto
- St Laurence's Church, Bradford-on-Avon, Anglo-Saxon church in Bradford-on-Avon, England

== Places ==
- St. Lawrence River, a large river in North America
  - Estuary of St. Lawrence, an estuary at the mouth of Saint Lawrence river, in Quebec
- St. Lawrence Seaway
- Gulf of St. Lawrence, an estuary
- Saint Lawrence Lowlands, the physiographic region

=== Australia ===
- St Lawrence, Queensland, a coastal town, north of Rockhampton

=== Barbados ===
- Saint Lawrence, Christ Church, which includes the neighbourhood Saint Lawrence Gap

=== Belgium ===
- Sint-Laureins, a village in East Flanders

=== Canada ===
- St. Lawrence, Newfoundland and Labrador
- St. Lawrence, Toronto, one of the oldest neighbourhoods in Toronto, Ontario
- St. Lawrence (electoral district), a former federal riding of Canada in Quebec
- Little St. Lawrence, a local service district and designated place

=== China ===
- St. Lawrence Parish, in Macau

=== Jersey ===
- Saint Lawrence, Jersey, a parish of Jersey, in the Channel Islands

=== United Kingdom ===
- St Lawrence, Isle of Wight, a small village on the South coast
- St Lawrence, Essex, a small village on the river Blackwater in Essex
- St. Lawrence, a small village in the centre of Ramsgate in Kent
- St Lawrence, a hamlet outside Bodmin, Cornwall

=== United States ===
- St. Lawrence, Pennsylvania
- St. Lawrence, South Dakota
- St. Lawrence, Wisconsin, a town
- Saint Lawrence (community), Wisconsin, an unincorporated community
- St. Lawrence County, New York
- St. Lawrence Island, an island of Alaska in the Bering Sea
- St. Lawrence Township, Scott County, Minnesota

== Schools ==
- St Lawrence Academy (disambiguation)
- St. Lawrence's Boys' School, Karachi, Pakistan
- St. Lawrence College (disambiguation), including St. Laurence's
- St. Lawrence's Girls' School, Karachi, Pakistan
- St. Lawrence High School (disambiguation), including St. Laurence
- St Laurence School, Bradford on Avon, England
- St. Lawrence University (disambiguation)

== Ships ==
- HMS St Lawrence, a number of ships of the Royal Navy
- St. Lawrence II, a sail training ship launched in 1953
- USS St. Lawrence (1848), a U.S. Navy frigate

== Other uses ==
- St. Lawrence (restaurant), a restaurant in Vancouver, British Columbia
- Saint Lawrence (Zurbarán), a 17th-century painting by Francisco de Zurbarán
- St. Lawrence Cathedral (disambiguation)
- St Lawrence's Church (disambiguation)
- St Lawrence Ground, home of Kent County Cricket Club in Canterbury, England
- St. Lawrence Market, a long-running market in Toronto
- St Lawrence railway station (disambiguation)
- St. Lawrence Records, whose subsidiary label Special Agent produced Barbara Acklin's first record
- St. Lawrence Saints ice hockey (disambiguation)
- Gaisford St Lawrence, the family name of the Earl of Howth in Ireland

== See also ==
- Saint Laurent (disambiguation)
- San Lawrenz, a village in Gozo, Malta
- San Lorenzo (disambiguation)
- Sankt Lorenzen (disambiguation)
- São Lourenço (disambiguation)
