= Saint Laurent =

Saint Laurent, Saint-Laurent, St. Laurent or St-Laurent may refer to:

- Saint Lawrence or Saint Laurent (225-258), a Christian martyr

== Places ==
=== Canada ===
- Saint-Laurent river
- St. Laurent, Manitoba
- Saint-Laurent, New Brunswick
- Saint-Laurent, Quebec, a borough of the city of Montreal, Quebec
- Bas-Saint-Laurent, a region of Quebec
- Saint-Laurent (federal electoral district), an electoral district Montreal, Quebec
- Louis-Saint-Laurent (federal electoral district), a federal riding of Canada in Quebec
- Saint-Laurent—Cartierville, a federal riding of Canada in Quebec
- Saint-Laurent (provincial electoral district), a Quebec provincial electoral district
- Montréal-Saint-Laurent, a former Quebec provincial electoral district
- St. Laurent de Grandin, Saskatchewan
- Saint-Laurent-de-l'Île-d'Orléans

=== France ===
- Saint-Laurent, Ardennes, in the Ardennes département
- Saint-Laurent, Cher, in the Cher département
- Saint-Laurent, Côtes-d'Armor, in the Côtes-d'Armor département
- Saint-Laurent, Creuse, in the Creuse département
- Saint-Laurent, Haute-Garonne, in the Haute-Garonne département
- Saint-Laurent, Haute-Savoie, in the Haute-Savoie département
- Saint-Laurent, Lot-et-Garonne, in the Lot-et-Garonne département
- Saint-Laurent-Blangy, in the Pas-de-Calais département
- Saint-Laurent-Bretagne, in the Pyrénées-Atlantiques département
- Saint-Laurent-Chabreuges, in the Haute-Loire département
- Saint-Laurent-d'Agny, in the Rhône département
- Saint-Laurent-d'Aigouze, in the Gard département
- Saint-Laurent-d'Andenay, in the Saône-et-Loire département
- Saint-Laurent-d'Arce, in the Gironde département
- Saint-Laurent-de-Belzagot, in the Charente département
- Saint-Laurent-de-Brèvedent, in the Seine-Maritime département
- Saint-Laurent-de-Carnols, in the Gard département
- Saint-Laurent-de-Cerdans, in the Pyrénées-Orientales département
- Saint-Laurent-de-Céris, in the Charente département
- Saint-Laurent-de-Chamousset, in the Rhône département
- Saint-Laurent-de-Cognac, in the Charente département
- Saint-Laurent-de-Condel, in the Calvados département
- Saint-Laurent-de-Cuves, in the Manche département
- Saint-Laurent-de-Gosse, in the Landes département
- Saint-Laurent-de-Jourdes, in the Vienne département
- Saint-Laurent-de-la-Barrière, in the Charente-Maritime département
- Saint-Laurent-de-la-Cabrerisse, in the Aude département
- Saint-Laurent-de-la-Plaine, in the Maine-et-Loire département
- Saint-Laurent-de-la-Prée, in the Charente-Maritime département
- Saint-Laurent-de-la-Salanque, in the Pyrénées-Orientales département
- Saint-Laurent-de-la-Salle, in the Vendée département
- Saint-Laurent-de-Lévézou, in the Aveyron département
- Saint-Laurent-de-Lin, in the Indre-et-Loire département
- Saint-Laurent-de-Mure, in the Rhône département
- Saint-Laurent-de-Muret, in the Lozère département
- Saint-Laurent-de-Neste, in the Hautes-Pyrénées département
- Saint-Laurent-des-Arbres, in the Gard département
- Saint-Laurent-des-Autels, in the Maine-et-Loire département
- Saint-Laurent-des-Bâtons, in the Dordogne département
- Saint-Laurent-des-Bois, Eure, in the Eure département
- Saint-Laurent-des-Bois, Loir-et-Cher, in the Loir-et-Cher département
- Saint-Laurent-des-Combes, Charente, in the Charente département
- Saint-Laurent-des-Combes, Gironde, in the Gironde département
- Saint-Laurent-des-Hommes, in the Dordogne département
- Saint-Laurent-des-Mortiers, in the Mayenne département
- Saint-Laurent-des-Vignes, in the Dordogne département
- Saint-Laurent-de-Terregatte, in the Manche département
- Saint-Laurent-de-Trèves, in the Lozère département
- Saint-Laurent-de-Vaux, in the Rhône département
- Saint-Laurent-de-Veyrès, in the Lozère département
- Saint-Laurent-d'Oingt, in the Rhône département
- Saint-Laurent-d'Olt, in the Aveyron département
- Saint-Laurent-d'Onay, in the Drôme département
- Saint-Laurent-du-Bois, in the Gironde département
- Saint-Laurent-du-Cros, in the Hautes-Alpes département
- Saint-Laurent-du-Mont, in the Calvados département
- Saint-Laurent-du-Mottay, in the Maine-et-Loire département
- Saint-Laurent-du-Pape, in the Ardèche département
- Saint-Laurent-du-Plan, in the Gironde département
- Saint-Laurent-du-Pont, in the Isère département
- Saint-Laurent-du-Tencement, in the Eure département
- Saint-Laurent-du-Var, in the Alpes-Maritimes département
- Saint-Laurent-du-Verdon, in the Alpes-de-Haute-Provence département
- Saint-Laurent-en-Beaumont, in the Isère département
- Saint-Laurent-en-Brionnais, in the Saône-et-Loire département
- Saint-Laurent-en-Caux, in the Seine-Maritime département
- Saint-Laurent-en-Gâtines, in the Indre-et-Loire département
- Saint-Laurent-en-Grandvaux, in the Jura département
- Saint-Laurent-en-Royans, in the Drôme département
- Saint-Laurent-l'Abbaye, in the Nièvre département
- Saint-Laurent-la-Conche, in the Loire département
- Saint-Laurent-la-Gâtine, in the Eure-et-Loir département
- Saint-Laurent-la-Roche, in the Jura département
- Saint-Laurent-la-Vallée, in the Dordogne département
- Saint-Laurent-la-Vernède, in the Gard département
- Saint-Laurent-le-Minier, in the Gard département
- Saint-Laurent-les-Bains, in the Ardèche département
- Saint-Laurent-les-Églises, in the Haute-Vienne département
- Saint-Laurent-les-Tours, in the Lot département
- Saint-Laurent-Lolmie, in the Lot département
- Saint-Laurent-Médoc, in the Gironde département
- Saint-Laurent-Nouan, in the Loir-et-Cher département
- Saint-Laurent-Rochefort, in the Loire département
- Saint-Laurent-sous-Coiron, in the Ardèche département
- Saint-Laurent-sur-Gorre, in the Haute-Vienne département
- Saint-Laurent-sur-Manoire, in the Dordogne département
- Saint-Laurent-sur-Mer, in the Calvados département
- Saint-Laurent-sur-Othain, in the Meuse département
- Saint-Laurent-sur-Oust, in the Morbihan département
- Saint-Laurent-sur-Saône, in the Ain département
- Saint-Laurent-sur-Sèvre, in the Vendée département

=== French Guiana ===
- Saint-Laurent-du-Maroni

== Roads and transit stations ==
- Saint Laurent Boulevard, a street in Montreal
  - Saint-Laurent station (Montreal Metro), a rapid transit station in Montreal
- St. Laurent Boulevard (Ottawa), a main road in Ottawa's east end
  - St-Laurent station (Ottawa), a light rail station in Ottawa
- Boulevard Saint-Laurent (Gatineau), a main boulevard in downtown Gatineau, Quebec

== Other uses ==
- SS Saint-Laurent, a French 19th-century ocean liner
- Saint Laurent (cruise ship), a French cruise ship
- Saint-Laurent (train), a Canadian passenger train service
- Saint Laurent (film), a 2014 French biographical film about Yves Saint Laurent
- St. Laurent (grape), a wine grape that originated in France
- "Saint Laurent" (song), by DJ Sliink, Skrillex, and Wale, 2017
- Cégep de Saint-Laurent, a CEGEP in Montreal
- Church of Saint-Laurent, a church in Paris
- Saint-Laurent Nuclear Power Plant, in Saint-Laurent-Nouan, France
- Saint-Laurent Herald, one of the Heralds of Arms at the Canadian Heraldic Authority
- St. Laurent Shopping Centre, a shopping centre in Ottawa
- Yves Saint Laurent (fashion house), a luxury fashion house commonly known as Saint Laurent
  - Saint Laurent Productions, the fashion house's production company

== People with the surname ==
- Charlotte-Françoise de Saint-Laurent (1660–1732), Canadian countess and business person
- Jean-Paul St. Laurent, Canadian politician and son of Louis St. Laurent
- Jeanne St. Laurent, wife of the former Canadian prime minister
- Louis St. Laurent, 12th Prime Minister of Canada
- Yves Saint Laurent (designer)
- Jared St. Laurent, commentator for Major League Wrestling

== See also ==
- Battle of St-Laurent-de-la-Muga (1794), a battle between France and Spain
- Laurent (disambiguation)
- Laurent (name)
- Laurent-Marie-Joseph Imbert, one of the Korean Martyrs
- Saint Lawrence (disambiguation)
- San Lawrenz, a village in Gozo, Malta
- San Lorenzo (disambiguation)
- Sankt Lorenzen (disambiguation)
- São Lourenço (disambiguation)
- Yves Saint Laurent (film), a 2014 French biographical film
