= San Lorenzo District =

San Lorenzo District may refer to:

== Costa Rica ==
- San Lorenzo District, Tarrazú, in Tarrazú (canton), San José Province

== Panama ==
- San Lorenzo District, Panama

== Paraguay ==
- San Lorenzo District, Paraguay

== Peru ==
- San Lorenzo District, Jauja, in Jauja Province, Junín Region

== See also ==
- San Lorenzo (disambiguation)
