= Basilica of St. Lawrence =

The Basilica of St. Lawrence may refer to:

== Austria ==
- Basilica of St. Lawrence, Enns

== Bolivia ==
- Cathedral Basilica of St. Lawrence, Santa Cruz de la Sierra

== Germany ==
- St. Lorenz Basilica, Kempten, Bavaria

== India ==
- St. Lawrence Shrine Basilica, Attur

== Italy ==
- Basilica of San Lorenzo, Florence
- Basilica of San Lorenzo, Milan
- San Lorenzo fuori le mura (the Papal Basilica of St. Lawrence Outside the Walls), Rome
- San Lorenzo in Damaso, Rome
- Minor Basilica of St. Lawrence in Lucina, Rome
- Trapani Cathedral, Sicily

== United States ==
- Basilica of St. Lawrence, Asheville, North Carolina

== See also ==
- Basilica di San Lorenzo (disambiguation)
- Saint Lawrence (disambiguation)
- St. Laurence's Church (disambiguation)
- Cathedral of Saint Lawrence (disambiguation)
