= St. Lawrence College =

St. Lawrence College or St. Laurence College may refer to:

- St Laurence's College, a Catholic secondary school in Brisbane, Australia
- Cégep de Saint-Laurent, in Montreal, Quebec, Canada
- St. Lawrence College, Ontario, in Kingston, Canada
- St Lawrence College, Athens, Greece
- St Lawrence College, Ramsgate, United Kingdom

== See also ==
- St. Lawrence University (disambiguation)
- Saint Lawrence (disambiguation)
