= Kempten =

Town in Bavaria, Germany

- Town
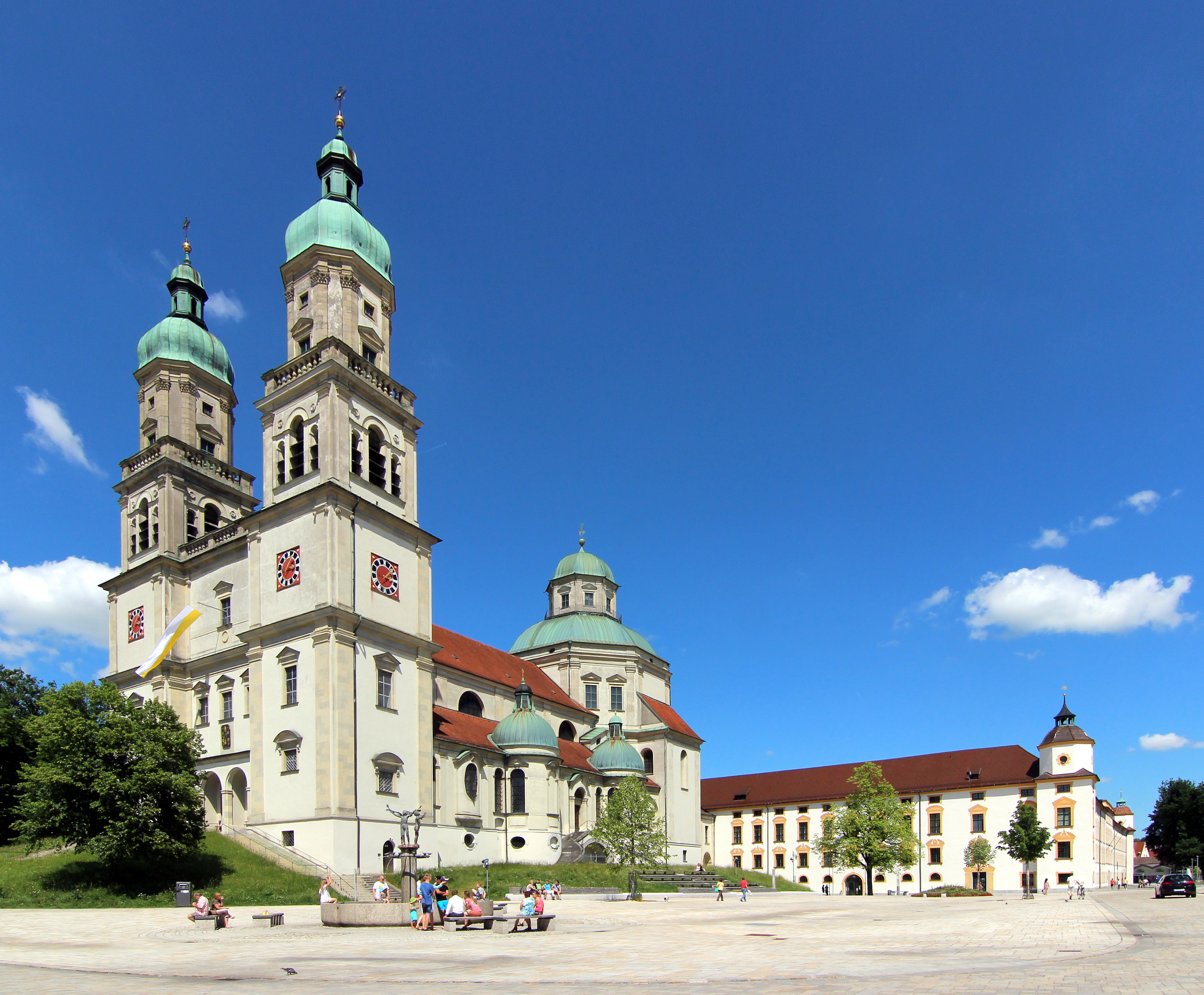
- Church St. Lorenz Basilica

- Flag Coat of arms
- Interactive map of Kempten
- Location within Germany Location within Bavaria
- Coordinates: 47°44′N 10°19′E
- Country: Germany
- State: Bavaria
- Admin. region: Swabia
- District: Urban district

Government
  - Mayor (2026–32): Christian Schoc (FW)

Area
  - Total: 63.28 km^{2} (24.43 sq mi)
- Elevation: 674 m (2,211 ft)

Population (2025-12-31)
  - Total: 67,916
  - Density: 1,073/km^{2} (2,780/sq mi)
- Time zone: UTC+01:00 (CET)
  - Summer (DST): UTC+02:00 (CEST)
- Postal codes: 87401–87439
- Dialling codes: 0831
- Vehicle registration: KE
- Website: www.kempten.de

Kempten (German: [ˈkɛmptn̩]; Swabian: Kempte [ˈkɛmptə]) is the largest town of Allgäu, in Swabia, Bavaria, Germany. The population was about 68,000 in 2016. The area was possibly settled originally by Celts, but was later taken over by the Romans, who called the town Cambodunum. Kempten is one of the oldest urban settlements (town) in Germany.

== History ==
=== Pre-Roman ===
The Greek geographer Strabo mentions in 50 BC a town of the Celtic Estiones named Kambodunon. This is considered the oldest written reference of any German city. So far no archaeological evidence could be found that this Celtic settlement really existed.

=== Roman era ===
In 15 BC Roman troops led by Nero Claudius Drusus and his brother Tiberius conquered and destroyed the existing Celtic settlement. In the following years the city, whose name was Latinized as Cambodunum, was rebuilt on a classical Roman city plan with baths, forum and temples. Initially in wood, the city was later rebuilt in stone after a devastating fire that destroyed almost the entire city in the year 69 AD. The city possibly served as provincial capital of Raetia during the first century before Augsburg took over this role. Extensive archaeological excavations at the end of the 19th century and again during the 1950s at what were then the outskirts of Kempten unearthed the extensive structural foundations.

The city was again destroyed in 233 AD by the Alemanni, a Suebic tribe. The original site of Cambodunum was then abandoned and the settlement moved to a strategically safer location on the Burghalde hill overlooking the river Iller.

In the middle of the 5th century the last Roman troops had left the area and the city was entirely taken over by the Alemanni.

=== Middle Ages ===
After the Romans abandoned the settlement, it was moved from the hill down to the plains located next to the river Iller. In written sources, the town appears as Cambidano. Being still predominantly Alemannic, the town once more was destroyed by the Franks in 683 as a consequence of the city's support of an uprising against the Frankish kingdom.

Around 700 a monastery — Kempten Abbey — was built, the first in the Allgäu region, founded by two Benedictine monks from the Abbey of Saint Gall, Magnus von Füssen and Theodor. This new monastery's first abbot was one Audogar. Through the financial and lobbyist support of Charlemagne’s wife Hildegard, an Allemannic princess, the monastery came to be one of the most privileged of the Frankish Empire.

After the abbey had several times been ravaged by the Magyars, the Prince-Bishop of Augsburg, Ulrich of Augsburg, who was also Abbot of Kempten, began the rebuilding of both the monastery and the city in 941.

In 1213, the Holy Roman Emperor Frederick II declared the abbots members of the Reichstag and granted the Abbot of Kempten the right to bear the title of Duke. However in 1289, King Rudolf I of Germany also granted special privileges to the urban settlement in the river valley, making it the Free Imperial City of Kempten. In 1525 the last property rights held by the abbots in the Imperial City were sold in the so-called "Great Purchase", marking the start of the co-existence of two independent cities next to each other, each bearing the same name. More conflict arose in 1527 after the Imperial City converted to Protestantism in direct opposition to the Catholic monastery (and Free City).

=== Renaissance and Baroque to Modern Age ===
During the turmoil of the Thirty Years' War (1632–33), both cities were destroyed by the imperial forces and the Swedish troops respectively.

In 1652 Roman Giel of Gielsberg, the Abbot of Kempten, commissioned the architects Michael Beer and Johann Serro from Graubünden to build St. Lorenz Basilica as a new church to serve the parish and monastery, including a representative residence for the Duke-Abbots. This is acknowledged as the first large church built in Germany after the end of the Thirty Years' War.

During the Napoleonic Wars the Dukedom-Abbey and Imperial City came under Bavarian rule (1802–03). Finally, in 1819, the two rival cities were united into a single communal entity.

The city was the location of two subcamps of the Dachau concentration camp during World War II, each with about 700 inmates.

== Climate ==
Climate data for Kempten (1991–2020 normals)
Month	Jan	Feb	Mar	Apr	May	Jun	Jul	Aug	Sep	Oct	Nov	Dec	Year
Mean daily maximum °C (°F)	3.5 (38.3)	4.9 (40.8)	9.2 (48.6)	13.7 (56.7)	17.9 (64.2)	21.5 (70.7)	23.2 (73.8)	23.1 (73.6)	18.4 (65.1)	14.0 (57.2)	8.0 (46.4)	4.2 (39.6)	13.5 (56.3)
Daily mean °C (°F)	−0.8 (30.6)	−0.1 (31.8)	3.7 (38.7)	7.7 (45.9)	12.1 (53.8)	15.8 (60.4)	17.3 (63.1)	17.0 (62.6)	12.7 (54.9)	8.6 (47.5)	3.3 (37.9)	0.1 (32.2)	8.2 (46.8)
Mean daily minimum °C (°F)	−4.6 (23.7)	−4.5 (23.9)	−1.0 (30.2)	2.0 (35.6)	6.4 (43.5)	10.3 (50.5)	12.0 (53.6)	11.7 (53.1)	8.0 (46.4)	4.3 (39.7)	−0.5 (31.1)	−3.6 (25.5)	3.4 (38.1)
Average precipitation mm (inches)	80.7 (3.18)	73.0 (2.87)	86.3 (3.40)	74.3 (2.93)	124.1 (4.89)	143.1 (5.63)	141.5 (5.57)	147.3 (5.80)	100.4 (3.95)	81.3 (3.20)	82.0 (3.23)	90.0 (3.54)	1,222.8 (48.14)
Average precipitation days (≥ 1.0 mm)	15.7	14.7	16.0	14.8	17.2	17.7	16.6	15.7	14.9	14.4	14.8	17.1	189.1
Average snowy days (≥ 1.0 cm)	17.8	17.6	9.5	2.4	0	0	0	0	0.1	0.6	6.4	14.4	68.8
Average relative humidity (%)	83.2	80.0	76.3	73.2	74.5	74.3	74.5	77.1	82.1	84.2	86.1	85.1	79.2
Mean monthly sunshine hours	84.2	102.4	145.7	173.5	189.0	204.0	225.0	215.5	162.6	123.5	85.0	75.7	1,802.4
Source: World Meteorological Organization

== Main sights ==
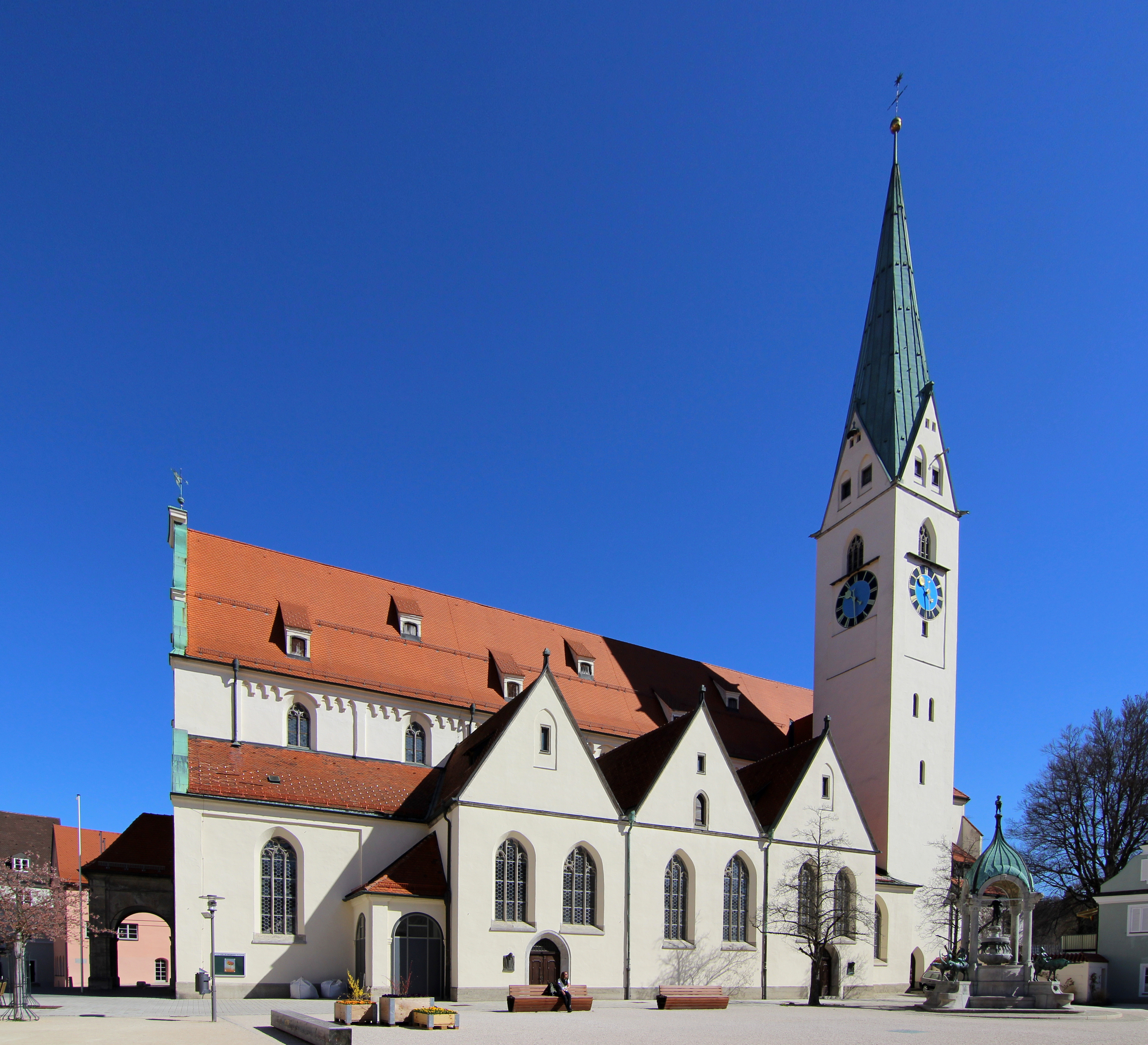
Gothic St. Mang Church

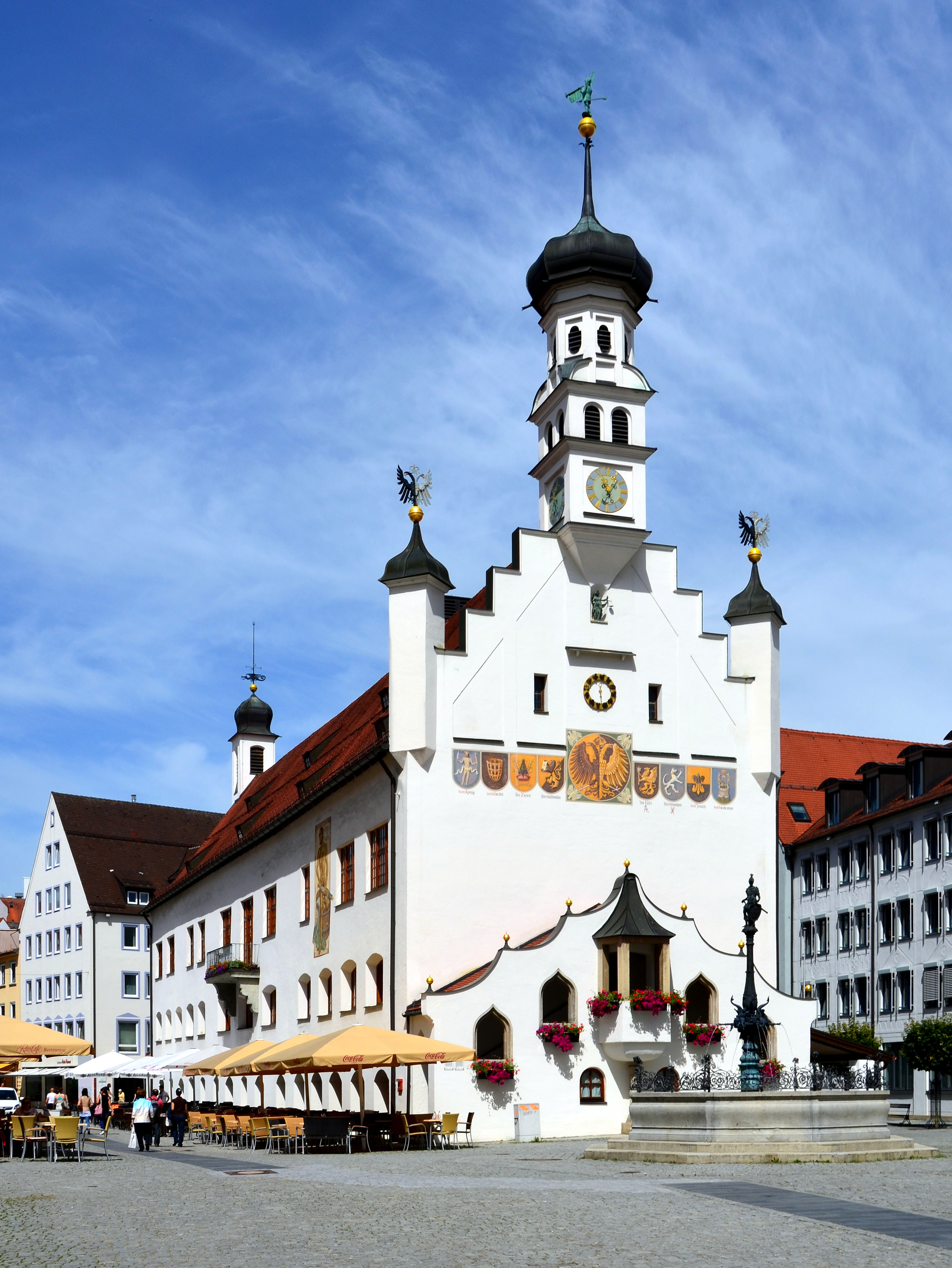
City Hall and Market Square

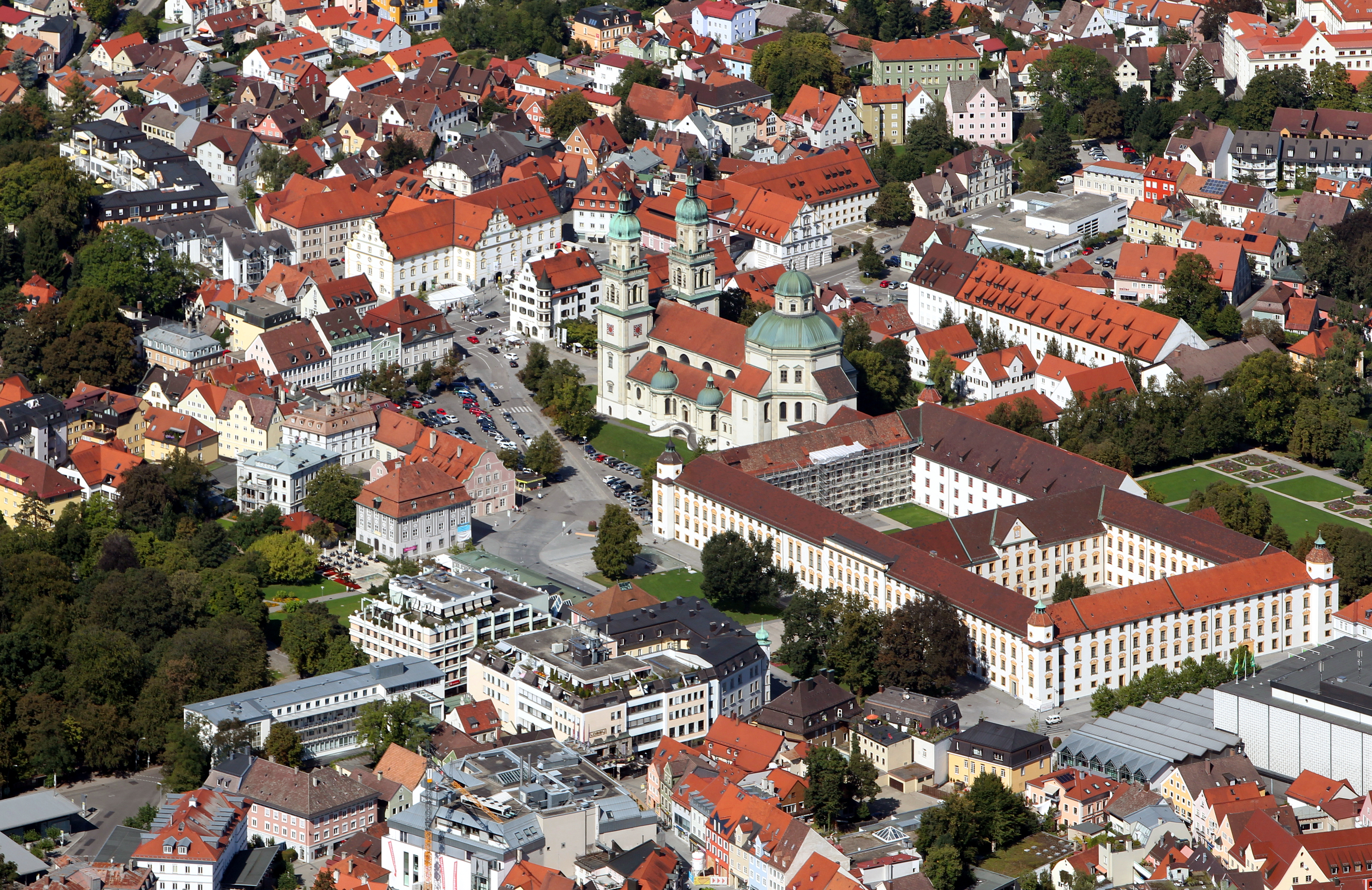
View of the city

- The St. Lorenz Basilica (Basilica minor)
- The St. Mang Church
- The Burghalde, a ruin
- The Duke-Abbots' Residence
- The Archaeological Park Cambodunum
- The City Hall and Square
- The Erasmuskapelle (an underground chapel)

== Transport ==
Kempten is well connected with the region through the A 7 autobahn (Würzburg–Ulm–Füssen). Bundesstraßen B 12 (partly as A 980 autobahn), B 19 and B 309 also intersect in Kempten.

The city is on the Buchloe–Lindau railway, opened as part of the Ludwig South-North Railway in 1852, and Kempten station currently boasts good InterCity and EuroCity rail connections.

The city bus system is operated by Kemptener Verkehrsbetriebe, which operates over 20 lines.

The nearest airport is Memmingen Airport, located 42 km (26 mi) to the north of Kempten.

== Education ==
The Kempten University of Applied Sciences started in the winter semester of 1978–79 with 89 students and since then expanded and now accommodates more than 2800 students in eight degree courses:

- Business Administration
- Computer Science
- Electrical Engineering
- Industrial Engineering – Electronic and Information Technology
- Industrial Engineering – Mechanical Engineering with Distribution Management or Information Technology
- Mechanical Engineering
- Social Management
- Tourism and Hospitality Management

There are also three college preparatory schools, called Gymnasium, (Allgäu-Gymnasium, Hildegardis-Gymnasium, Carl-von-Linde-Gymnasium) offering secondary education to the entire region of the Allgäu.

== Sport and leisure ==
The association football team FC Kempten play at the Illerstadion, which is also used for athletics. It is located on Illerdamm 10. The stadium used to have a motorcycle speedway track and hosted the final of the 1965 Speedway World Team Cup. An American football team called the Allgäu Comets also use the stadium.

Motor racing team Abt Sportsline is based in Kempten.

== Notable people ==
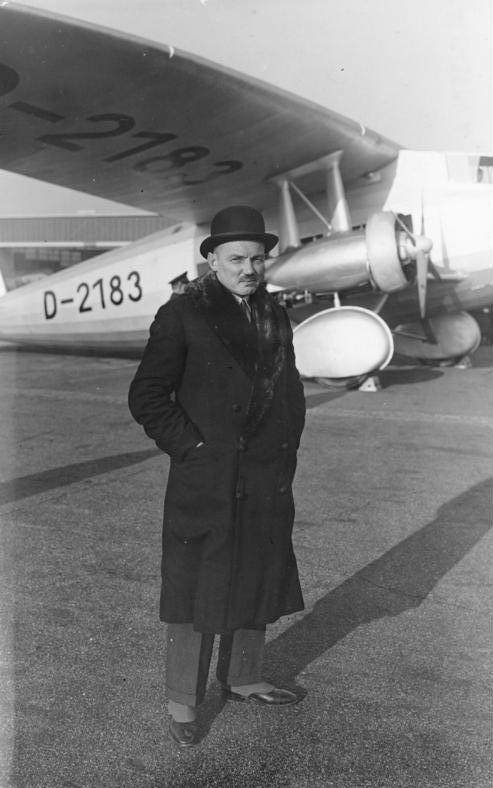
Claude Dornier, 1931

- Friedrich Ferdinand Schnitzer (1840–1910), United States architect.
- Carl von Linde (1842–1934), scientist and inventor in cooling technology
- Claude Dornier (1884–1969), aircraft designer
- Ernst Mayr (1904–2005), German-American biologist
- Ignaz Kiechle (1930–2003), politician (CSU), member of Bundestag 1969–1994, Minister for Food, Agriculture and Forestry 1983–1993
- Heide Schmidt (born 1948), Austrian politician
- Günther Dollinger (born 1960), physicist and professor
- Franz Engstler (born 1961), racing driver
- Christian Abt (born 1967), racing driver
- İlhan Mansız (born 1975), Turkish footballer
- Peter Terting (born 1984), racing driver
- Lisa Brennauer (born 1988), world champion cyclist
- Daniel Abt (born 1992), racing driver

== Twin towns – sister cities ==
Kempten is twinned with:

- Bad Dürkheim, Germany (2001)
- Quiberon, France (1971)
- (Republic of Ireland) Sligo, Ireland (1990)
- Sopron, Hungary (1987)
- Trento, Italy (1987)
