= Lawrence Academy =

Lawrence Academy may refer to:

- Lawrence Academy (Groton, Massachusetts), Groton, Massachusetts (private, secondary, boarding school).
- Lawrence Academy (North Carolina), Merry Hill, North Carolina (private, day school, K–12).
- Lawrence Academy (Falmouth, Massachusetts), a heritage building in Falmouth, Massachusetts.

== See also ==
- Lawrence College (disambiguation)
- St Lawrence Academy (disambiguation)
