= Basilica di San Lorenzo =

The Basilica di San Lorenzo may refer to one of the following churches:

== Germany ==
- St. Lorenz Basilica, Kempten, Bavaria

== Italy ==
- Basilica di San Lorenzo di Firenze (Basilica of San Lorenzo), Florence
- Basilica di San Lorenzo Maggiore (Basilica of San Lorenzo), Milan
- Basilica Papale di San Lorenzo fuori le Mura (Basilica of Saint Lawrence outside the Walls), Rome

== See also ==
- Basilica of St. Lawrence (disambiguation)
- San Lorenzo (disambiguation)
