= Lawrence College =

Lawrence College may refer to:

- Lawrence College Ghora Gali, a boarding school in Punjab, Pakistan
- Lawrence University, a private liberal arts college in Appleton, Wisconsin, United States, named "Lawrence College" from 1913 until 1964
- Sarah Lawrence College, a private liberal arts college in Yonkers, New York, United States
- St. Lawrence College, Ontario, a college of applied arts and technology in Ontario, Canada
- St Lawrence College, Ramsgate, a co-educational independent school in Ramsgate, England, United Kingdom

== See also ==
- Lawrence Technological University, private university in Southfield, Michigan
- St. Lawrence Academy, early former name of State University of New York at Potsdam
- St. Lawrence University, liberal arts college in St. Lawrence County, New York
- St. Lawrence University (Uganda), private university in Kampala, Uganda
- Lawrence Academy (disambiguation)
