= Laurent =

Laurent may refer to:

- Laurent (name), a French masculine given name and a surname
  - Saint Laurence (aka: Saint Laurent), the martyr Laurent
  - Pierre Alphonse Laurent, mathematician
  - Joseph Jean Pierre Laurent, amateur astronomer, discoverer of minor planet (51) Nemausa
- Laurent, South Dakota, a proposed town for the Deaf to be named for Laurent Clerc

== See also ==
- Laurent series, in mathematics, representation of a complex function f(z) as a power series which includes terms of negative degree, named for Pierre Alphonse Laurent
- Saint-Laurent (disambiguation)
- Laurence (name), feminine form of "Laurent"
- Lawrence (disambiguation)
