= San Lorenzo District, Paraguay =

San Lorenzo District
- district
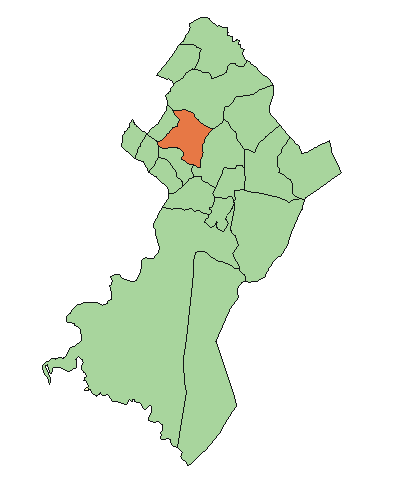

- Location within Paraguay
- Coordinates: 25°20′22″S 57°30′31″W
- Country: Paraguay
- Department: Central Department

Area
  - Total: 54.08 km^{2} (20.88 sq mi)

Population (2022)
  - Total: 225,395
  - Density: 4,168/km^{2} (10,790/sq mi)

San Lorenzo District is one of the districts of Central Department, Paraguay. It was officially established in 1775. As per the 2022 census, the district had a population of 225,395 inhabitants.

== History ==
The early settlements were established in 1604, when people started populating the agricultural lands of Ñu Guazú between the San Lorenzo river and Tapyipery, then known as Balsequillo. During the 17th century, the population gradually increased, with encomiendas established by settlers such as Francisco Cuevas and Juan Vanguelles. In 1698, the Jesuit priest Martín de Yegros donated his lands in the region to the Jesuit College of Asunción, which would result in land disputes between the Jesuits and local inhabitants during the early 18th century. In 1704, Governor Antonio Escobar y Gutiérrez conducted a registration of the residents. Historical accounts state that the locals supported José de Antequera y Castro during the Communer Revolution in 1724. During the early years, the local economy relied heavily on the sale of firewood used by steamships navigating the Paraguay and Paraná Rivers.

After the expulsion of the Jesuits in 1767, Agustín Fernando de Pinedo officially founded the town in 1775 under the authority of the Spanish Crown, which later became the district of San Lorenzo del Campo Grande. As there is no definitive founding date that exists, 10 August, the feast day of the patron saint, San Lorenzo, was later adopted as the official anniversary date. In the 20th century, the city was linked to Asunción by the famous Lechero Train.

== Geography ==
San Lorenzo is a district located in the Central Department in Paraguay. It occupies an area of 54.08 km^{2} (20.88 sq mi). The city of San Lorenzo is known as the "University City" as it hosts the main campus of the National University of Asunción.

== Demographics ==
As per the 2022 census, San Lorenzo had a population of 225,395 inhabitants of which 110,085 were males and 115,310 were females. The entire population was classified as urban. About 21.3% of the population was below the age of fourteen, and 9.1% was more than 65 years of age.
