= Río San Lorenzo =

Río San Lorenzo or San Lorenzo River or variant, may refer to:

- San Lorenzo River, California, USA
- San Lorenzo River (Mexico)

== See also ==
- Saint Lawrence River (U.S.-Canada; the Great Lakes)
- San Lorenzo (disambiguation)
