= Free Imperial City of Kempten =

Free city in the Holy Roman Empire

Coordinates: 47°43′40.66″N 10°48′48.5″E

Imperial City of Kempten in the Allgäu Reichstadt Kempten im Allgäu
- 1289–1802/3
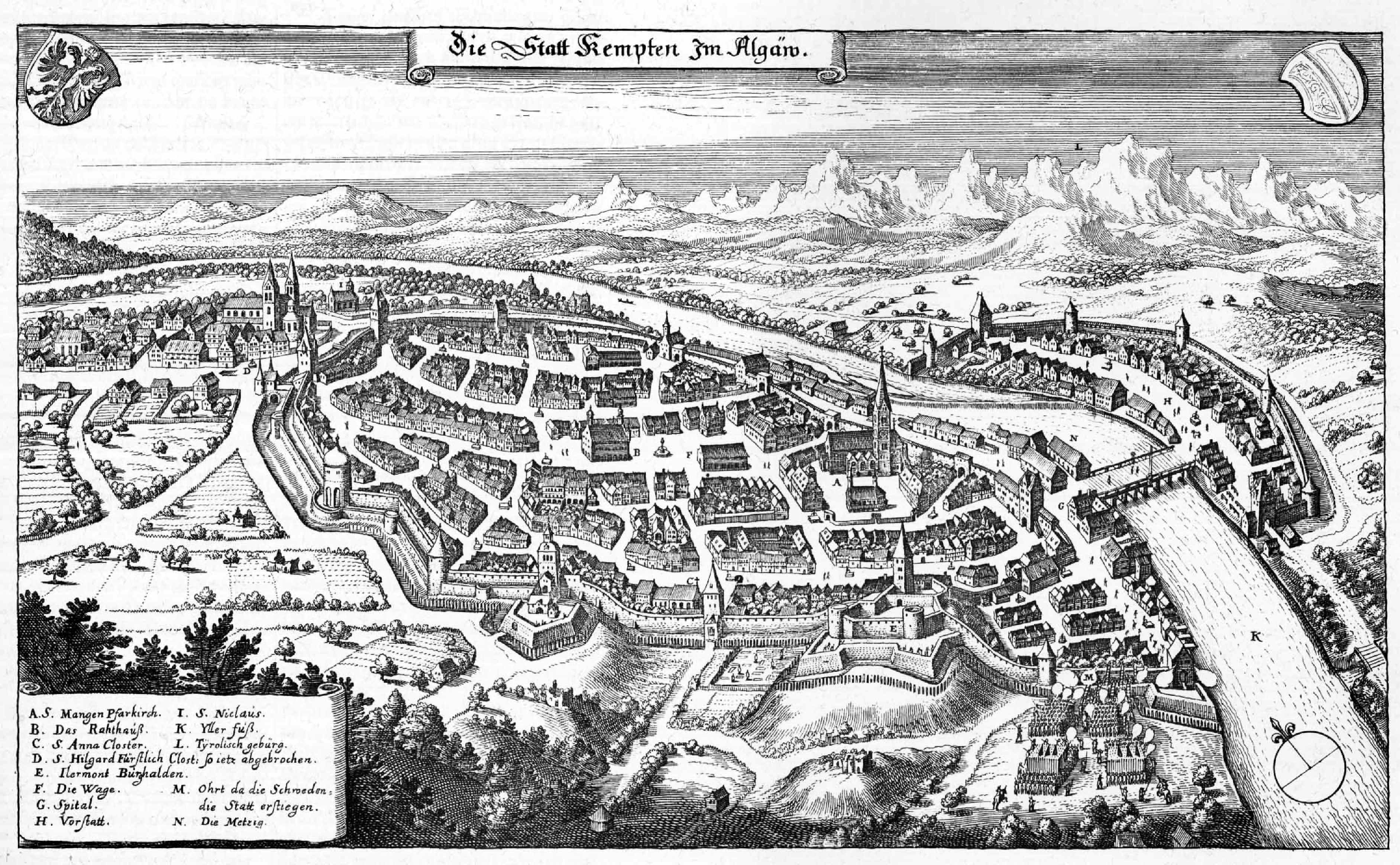
- A view of Kempten in 1650
- Status: Free Imperial City (State of the Holy Roman Empire)
- Capital: Kempten im Allgäu
- Government: Republic
- Historical era: Middle Ages
  - City founded: before 50 BC
  - City gained Imperial immediacy: 1289
  - Abbey sold property within Imperial City: 1525
  - City converted to Protestantism: 1527
  - Mediatised to Bavaria: 1802/3
  - Abbey united with city: 1819
Preceded by	Succeeded by
Duchy of Franconia	Electorate of Bavaria

The Free Imperial City of Kempten was a Free Imperial City in the Swabian Circle.

== History ==
In 1213, Holy Roman Emperor Frederick II declared the abbots of Kempten Abbey members of the Imperial Diet and granted the abbot the right to bear the title of Duke, making the abbey the Imperial Ducal Abbey of Kempten.

In 1289, King Rudolf of Habsburg granted special privileges to the settlement in the river valley, making it an Imperial City. In 1525 the last property rights of the abbots in the Imperial City were sold in the so-called "Great Purchase", marking the start of the co-existence of two independent cities bearing the same name next to each other.

The Imperial City converted to Protestantism in direct opposition to the Catholic monastery in 1527, signing the Augsburg Confession.

During the turmoil of the Thirty Years' War (1632–33), the city was destroyed by imperial forces.

During the Napoleonic Wars the Imperial City came under Bavarian rule (1802–03). In 1819, the city was united with the properties of the Abbey into a single communal entity.
