= St. Lawrence High School =

Saint Lawrence High School may refer to:

== India ==
- St. Lawrence High School, in Kandivali, Mumbai, Maharashtra
- St. Lawrence High School, Kolkata, in Kolkata, West Bengal
- St. Lawrence High School (Santa Cruz), in Santa Cruz, Mumbai, Maharashtra
- St. Lawrence High School (Vashi), in Navi Mumbai, Maharashtra
- St. Lawrence High School (Aurangabad), in Aurangabad, Maharashtra

== United States ==
- St. Lawrence High School (Utica, Michigan)
- St. Lawrence Seminary High School, Mount Calvary, Wisconsin

== See also ==
- St. Laurence High School
