= St Lawrence's Church, Eckerö =

Coordinates: 60°12′28″N 19°36′45″E

St Lawrence's Church
- Eckerö Church
- S:t Lars kyrka
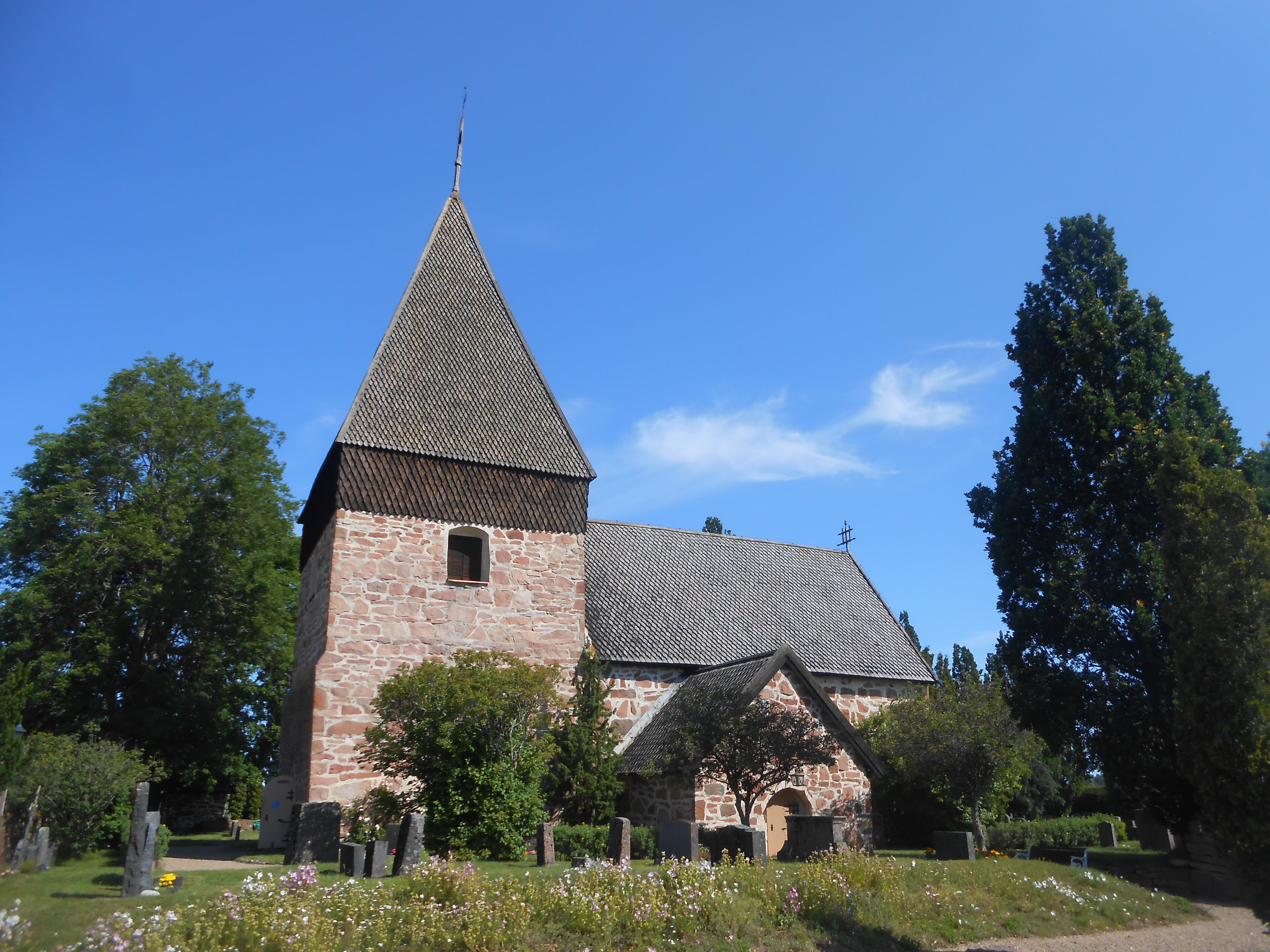
- St Lawrence's Church
- Location: Eckerö, Åland
- Address: Kyrkgatan 43, 22270 Eckerö, Åland
- Country: Finland
- Language: Swedish
- Denomination: Lutheranism
- Previous denomination: Roman Catholic
- Website: https://www.eckero-hammarland.fi/

History
- Dedication: St Lawrence

Architecture
- Style: Gothic
- Years built: C. 1380–1420

Specifications
- Materials: Grey stone

Administration
- Diocese: Diocese of Borgå
- Parish: Eckerö-Hammarland parish

St Lawrence's Church, located in Eckerö on the Åland Islands, is a medieval Lutheran stone church. The church represents a significant example of medieval ecclesiastical architecture in the Baltic region. Constructed from grey stone between 1380 and 1420, according to the most recent datings, the church was originally dedicated to Saint Lawrence during the Catholic period of Finland. The building features a rectangular nave oriented along an east–west axis, with a sacristy positioned to the north and a porch to the south. At the western end of the nave stands a substantial bell tower, its width matching that of the nave; notably, one of the bells has been dated to the 13th century, predating the current structure.

The church interior provides seating for approximately 275 congregants. Its altarpiece, The Sinful Woman Before Christ, was painted by Bernhard Reinhold in 1876. Among the church’s medieval furnishings are a wooden baptismal font and four wooden sculptures of saints. The pulpit, a later addition, was designed by the architect Carl Ludvig Engel. The organ, constructed by Hans Heinrich in 1971, is equipped with seven stops.

In the nearby area of Signilskär, Hammarland, the ruins of a chapel—likely dating from the 13th century—can be found, further attesting to the region’s long-standing ecclesiastical heritage. Opposite Eckerö Church stands the rectory, with its present appearance being the result of renovations carried out in the late 19th century.

== Images ==
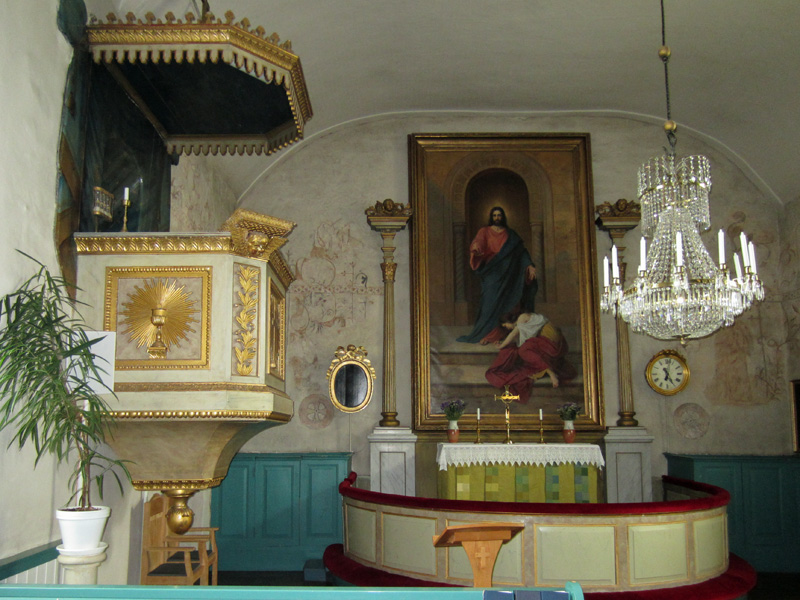
The altar of the church.

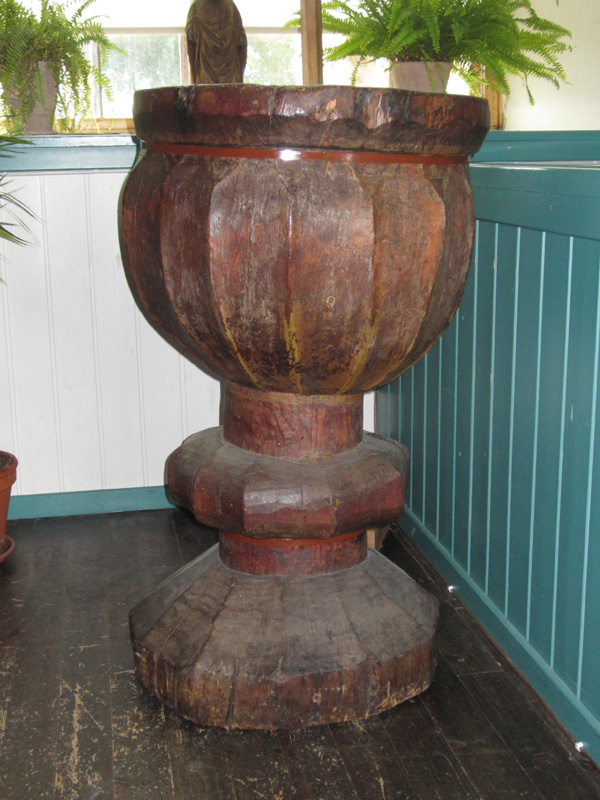
Eckerö Church baptismal font.

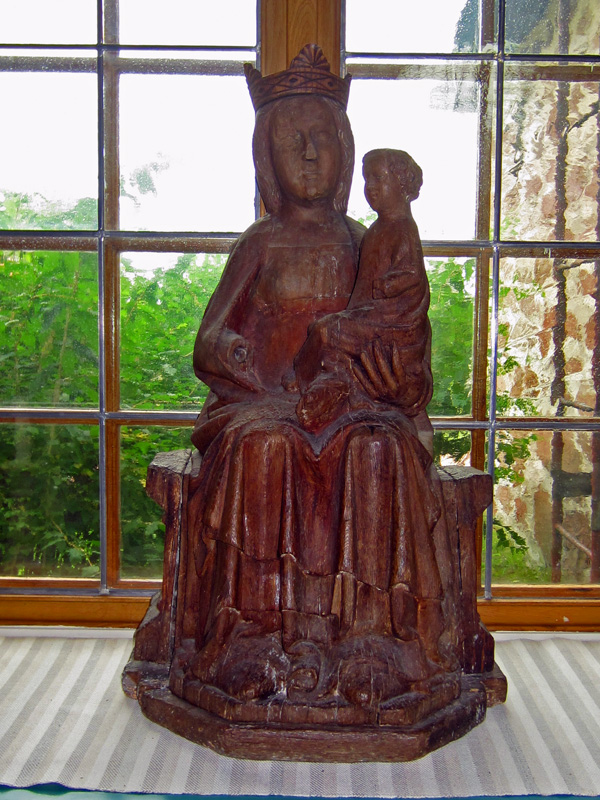
Wooden sculpture depicting madonna and child.

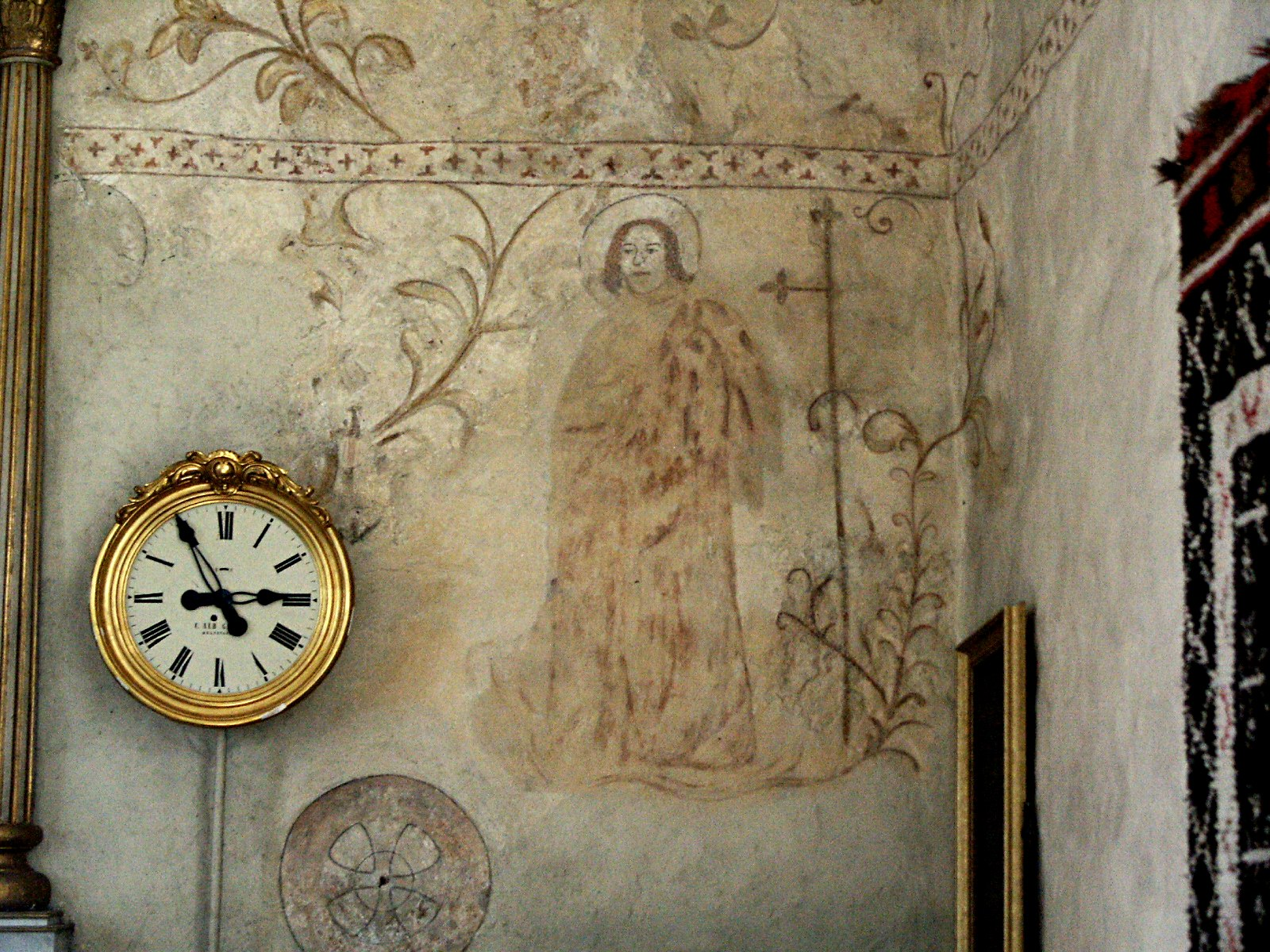
Late gothic wall paintings in Eckerö Church.
