= Church of San Lorenzo, Toledo =

Ruined church in Castile-La Mancha, Spain

Coordinates: 39.8550°N 4.0221°W

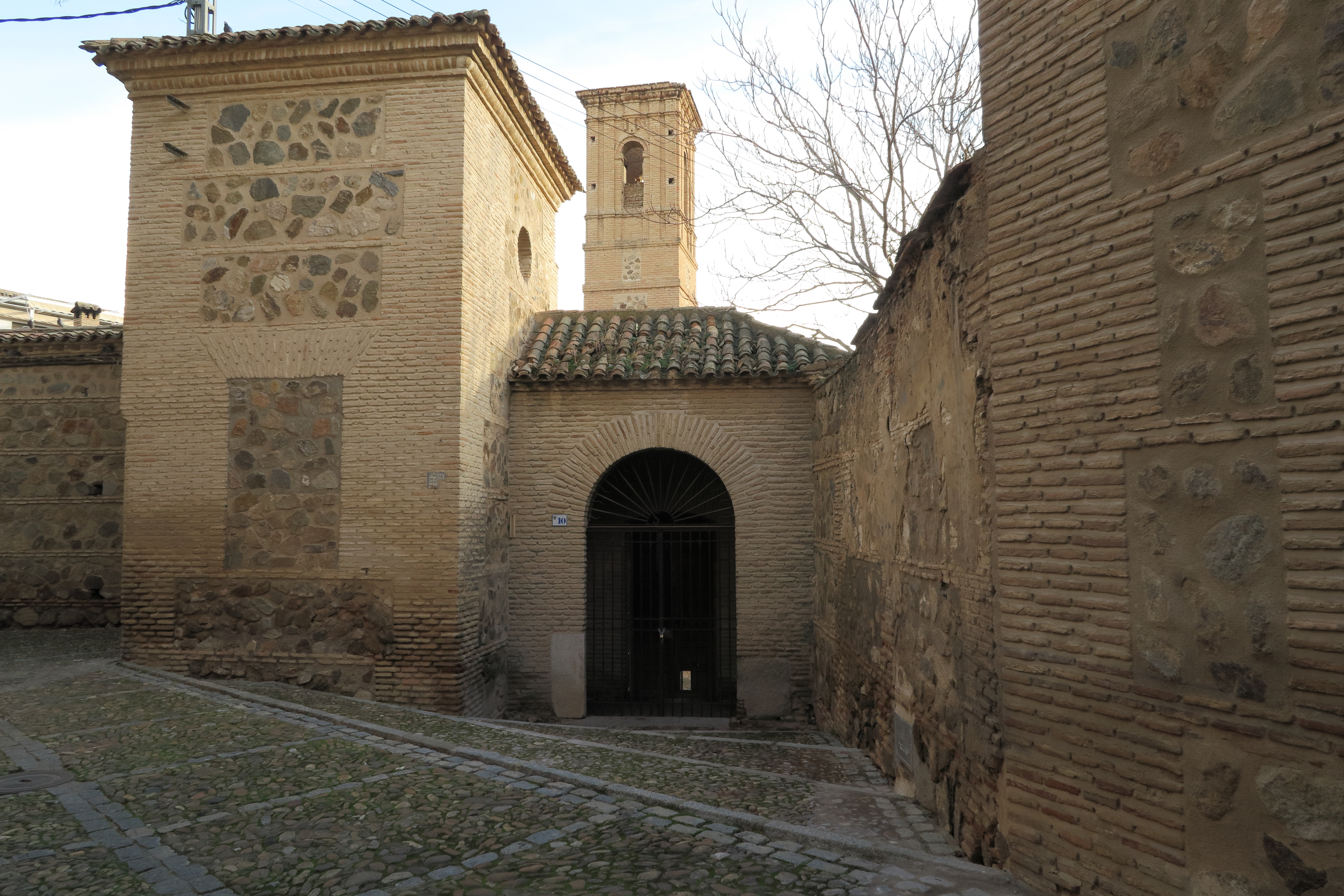
The remains of the Iglesia de San Lorenzo

St Lawrence's Church (Spanish: Iglesia de San Lorenzo) is a ruined medieval church located in Toledo, Spain. It was built on the site of a mosque. The building as it survives is later, but preserves some mudejar features.
