= San Lorenzo, Melfi =

Church building in Melfi, Italy

Coordinates: 40°59′46.9″N 15°39′09.6″E

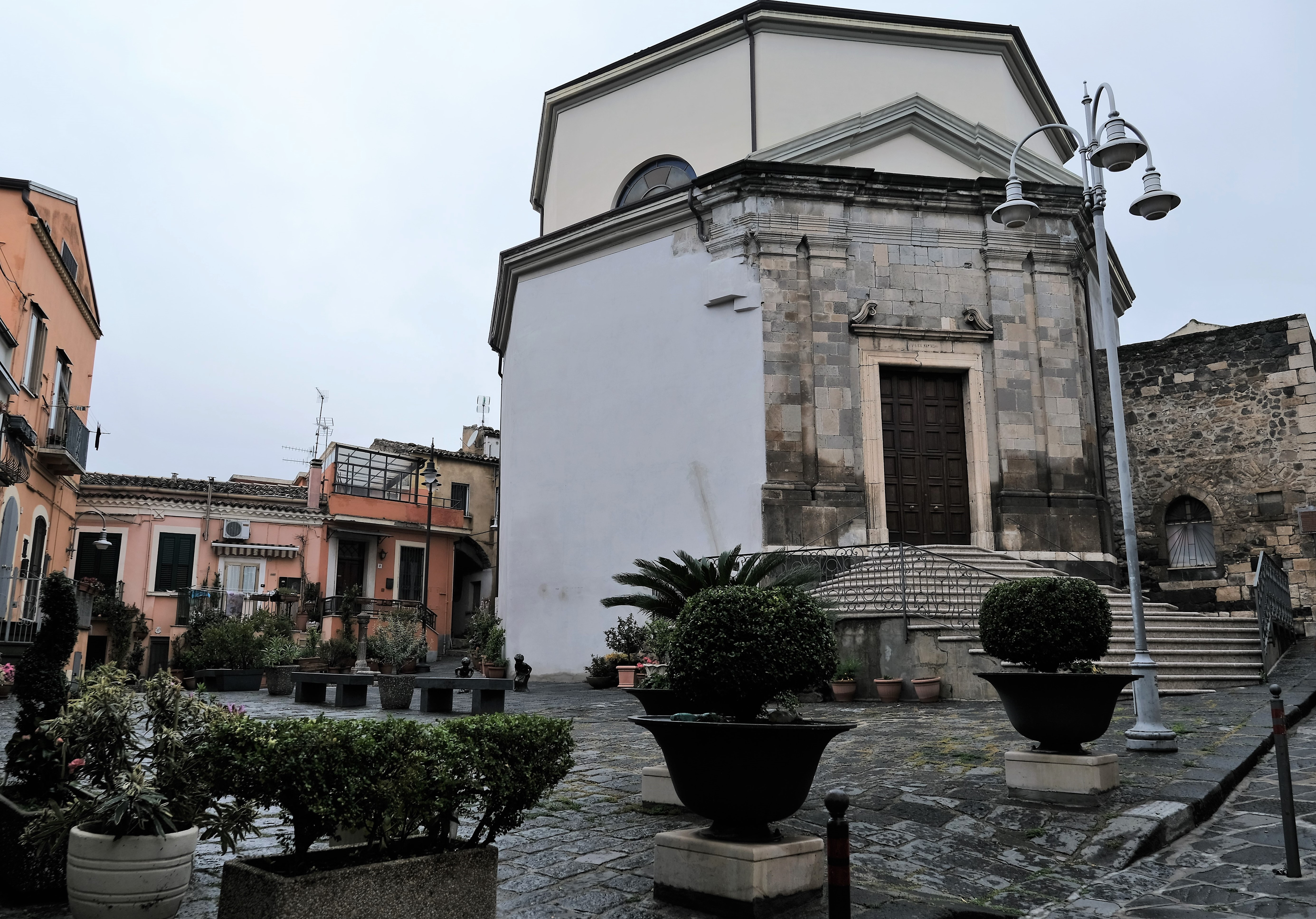

San Lorenzo is a Baroque-style Roman Catholic church building in Melfi, province of Potenza, region of Basilicata, Italy.

The octagonal church was initially built in the 1000s by the Byzantine rulers of the city, and was soon occupied by canons belonging to the nearby Abbey of Monticchio. In 1500, it became a parish church. The church has suffered damage over the centuries from the earthquakes. The present portal and long stairs appears to date to the 17th century. The adjacent bell-tower, rebuilt in the 14th century by the family of Niccolo Acciaiuoli, has since collapsed, and only the base remains. In 2015, the church underwent refurbishment including demolishing a parish house built to the left of the entrance portal.
