= St Lawrence Academy =

St Lawrence Academy or Saint Lawrence Academy may refer to:

- Saint Lawrence Academy (Santa Clara), a Catholic college preparatory school located in California, United States
- St Lawrence Academy (Scunthorpe), a Church of England secondary school located in Lincolnshire, England

== See also ==
- Saint Lawrence (disambiguation)
- Catholic University School (formerly St Lawrence's Academy)
