= São Lourenço do Piauí =

Coordinates: 9.16889°S 42.545°W

- Municipality
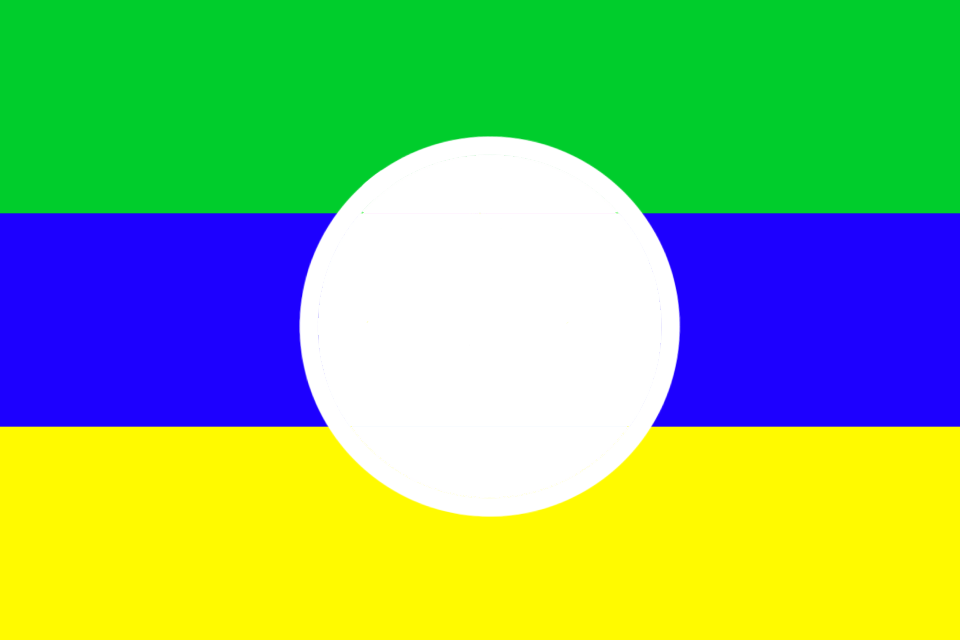
- Flag

- Country: Brazil
- Region: Nordeste
- State: Piauí
- Mesoregion: Sudoeste Piauiense

Population (2020)
  - Total: 4,577
- Time zone: UTC−3 (BRT)

São Lourenço do Piauí is a municipality in the state of Piauí in the Northeast region of Brazil.

== See also ==
- List of municipalities in Piauí
