= St. Lawrence Saints ice hockey =

St. Lawrence Saints ice hockey may refer to either of the ice hockey teams that represent St. Lawrence University:

- St. Lawrence Saints men's ice hockey
- St. Lawrence Saints women's ice hockey
