= Lovrečica =

Lovrečica San Lorenzo
- Village
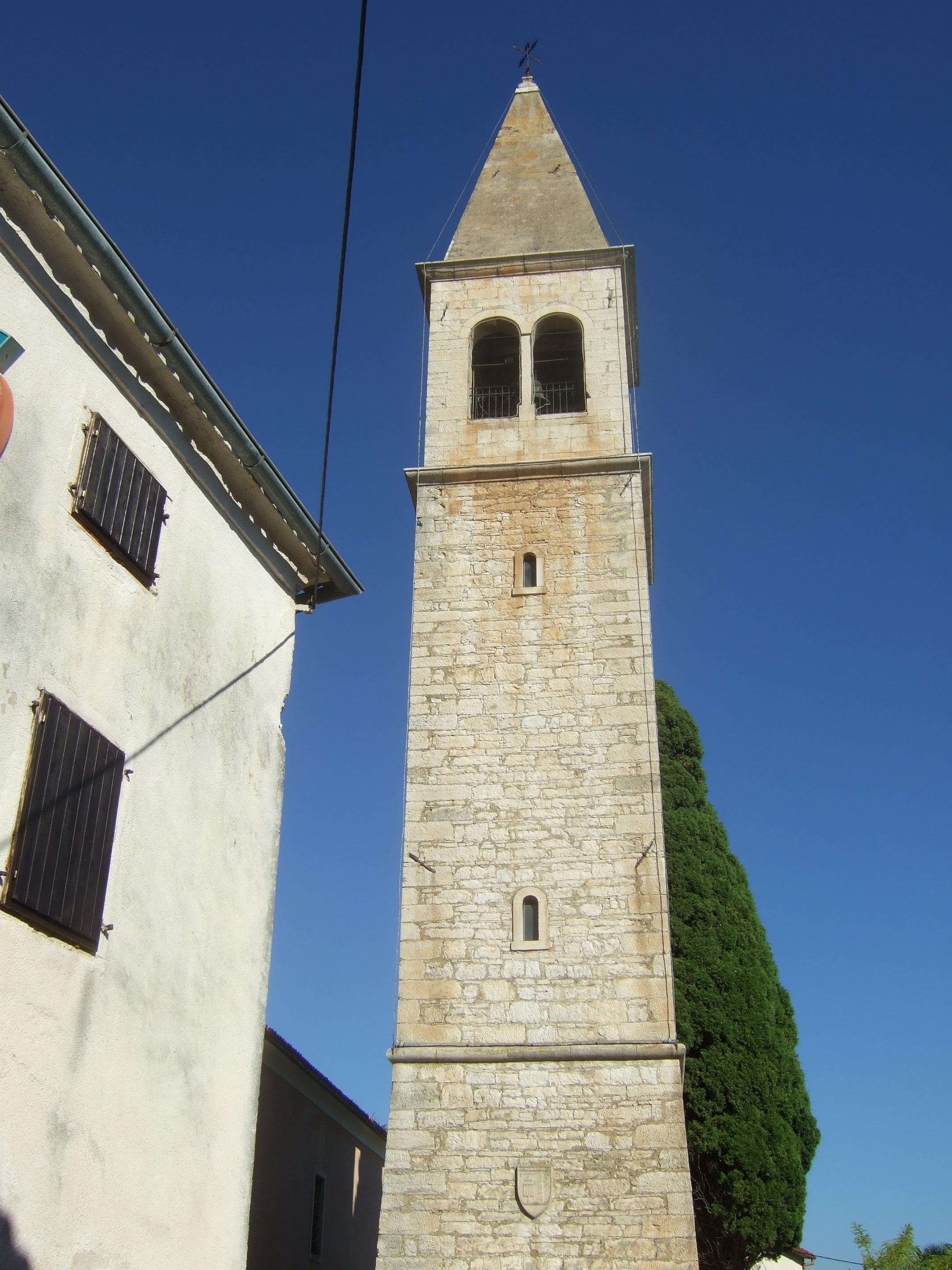
- Bell Tower of the church in Lovrečica, Istria, Croatia

- Location within Croatia
- Country: Croatia
- County: Istria County
- Municipality: Umag

Area
  - Total: 1.0 sq mi (2.6 km^{2})

Population (2021)
  - Total: 123
  - Density: 120/sq mi (47/km^{2})
- Time zone: UTC+1 (CET)
  - Summer (DST): UTC+2 (CEST)
- Postal code: 52470 Umag
- Area code: 052

Lovrečica or San Lorenzo is a village in Croatia. It is part of Umag.

The Miro Sailing and Windsurfing Academy offers courses on dinghies, sailboats, windsurf, kayak and SUP for all ages and all levels.

== Demographics ==
According to the 2021 census, its population was 123. It was 176 in 2011.
