= Cathedral of Saint Lawrence =

The Cathedral of St. Lawrence or Cathedral of Saint Laurence or variation, may refer to:

== Croatia ==
- Trogir Cathedral

== Czech Republic ==
- Cathedral of St Lawrence, Prague

== India ==
- Cathedral of St Lawrence, Belthangady

== Italy ==
- Genoa Cathedral

== Paraguay ==
- St. Lawrence Cathedral, San Lorenzo

== Sweden ==
- Lund Cathedral
- Uppsala Cathedral

== Switzerland ==
- Lugano Cathedral

== United States ==
- St. Laurence Catholic Church (Amarillo, Texas), United States, formerly St Laurence Cathedral

== See also ==
- St. Laurence's Church (disambiguation)
- Basilica of St. Lawrence (disambiguation)
- Saint Lawrence (disambiguation)
