= Saint Lawrence (Zurbarán) =

Painting by Francisco de Zurbarán

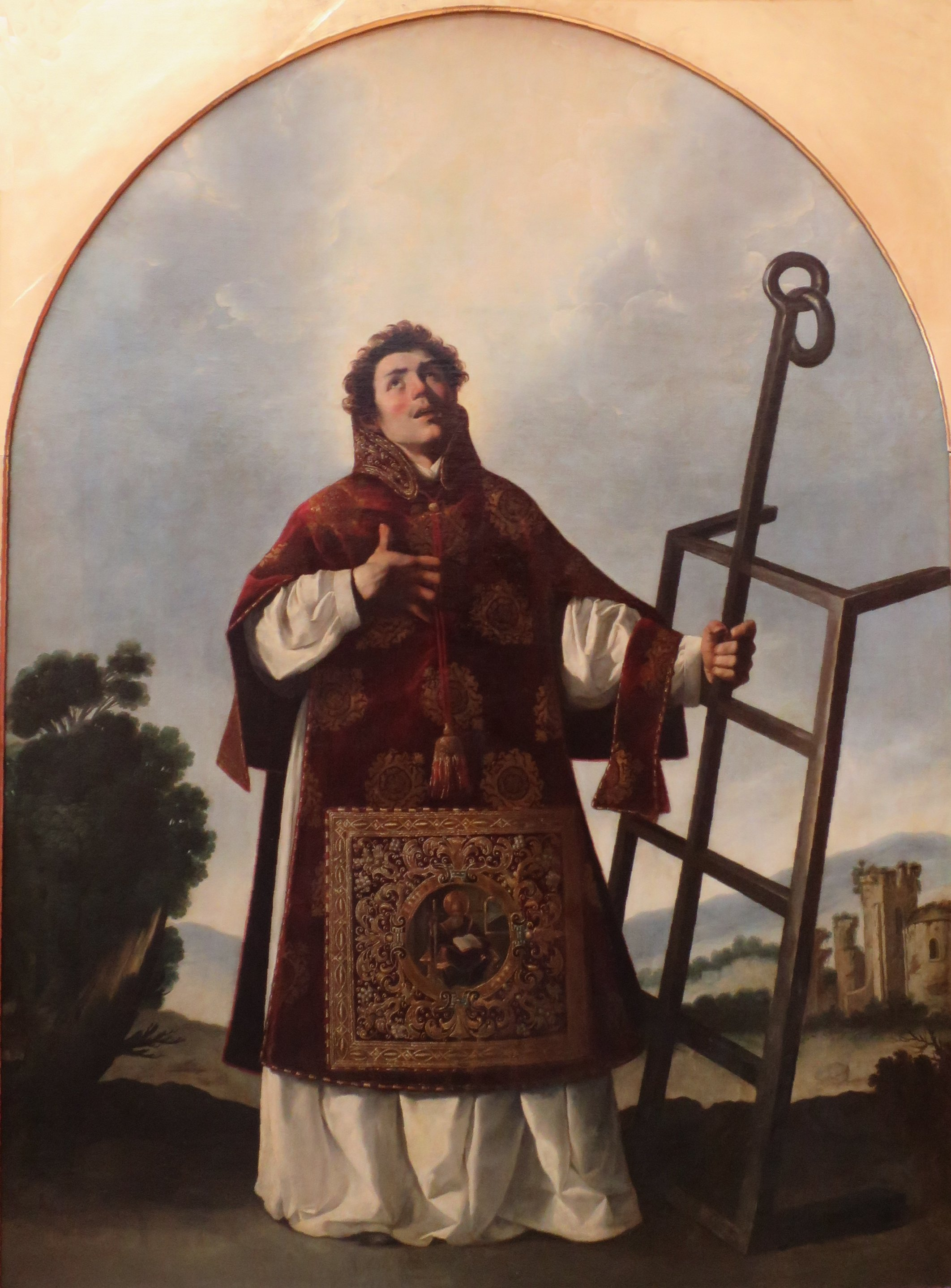
Saint Lawrence (1636–1639) by Francisco de Zurbarán

Saint Lawrence is an oil painting on canvas executed ca. 1636–1639 by the Spanish painter Francisco de Zurbarán. It has been in the Hermitage Museum in St Petersburg since the 19th century. It was probably commissioned by Cardinal Gabriele Paleotti, archbishop of Bologna, or by the Monastery of San José.

The painting shows Saint Lawrence holding a gridiron, the instrument of his martyrdom, and in a rich red dalmatic, showing his status as a martyr and a deacon. On the dalmatic is embroidered an image of Saint Paul, emphasising Lawrence's continuation of Paul's mission to the Gentiles, whilst over Lawrence's left wrist is a maniple, symbolising the chains placed on Christ at his arrest in the Garden of Gethsemane. The ruins of a pagan temple and green trees in the background symbolise the fall of pagan Rome and Christ's resurrection respectively.
