= Cathedral Basilica of St. Lawrence, Santa Cruz de la Sierra =

Coordinates: 17.7842°S 63.1817°W

Cathedral Basilica of St. Lawrence
- Catedral Metropolitana Basílica de San Lorenzo
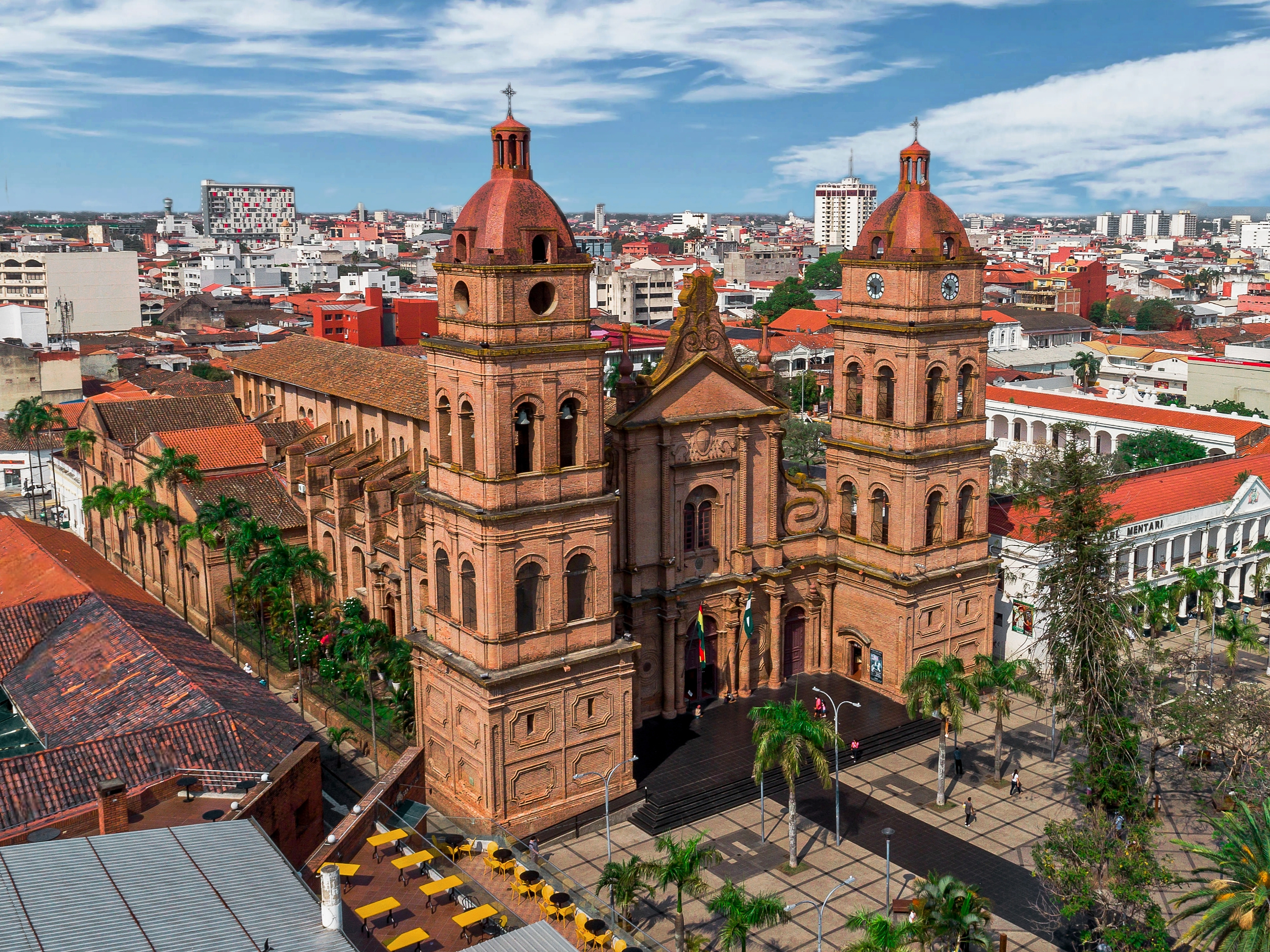
- Cathedral Basilica of St. Lawrence
- Location: Santa Cruz de la Sierra
- Country: Bolivia
- Denomination: Roman Catholic Church

Architecture
- Architect: Felipe Bertrés
- Completed: 1915

The Cathedral Basilica of St. Lawrence (Spanish: Catedral Metropolitana Basílica de San Lorenzo), also called Santa Cruz de la Sierra Cathedral, is the main Catholic church in the city of Santa Cruz de la Sierra, Bolivia. It is located in the city center, opposite the 24 de Septiembre Square.

The first church was built by the Mercedarian Fray Diego de Porres in times of Viceroy Francisco Álvarez de Toledo. In 1770, Bishop Ramán de Herbosos rebuilt the church, commending the sacristan Antonio Lombardo greatest gift the execution of the works. At the time of Marshal Andrés de Santa Cruz (1838), the old temple was replaced by a new church of eclectic style, designed by the French architect Felipe Bertres. It is notable for its wooden vaults and the pictorial decoration that covers them. In the main altar part of the original carved silver coating of the Jesuit mission of San Pedro de Moxos it is conserved. Four sculptural reliefs from the same mission are also exhibited.

== See also ==
- Roman Catholicism in Bolivia

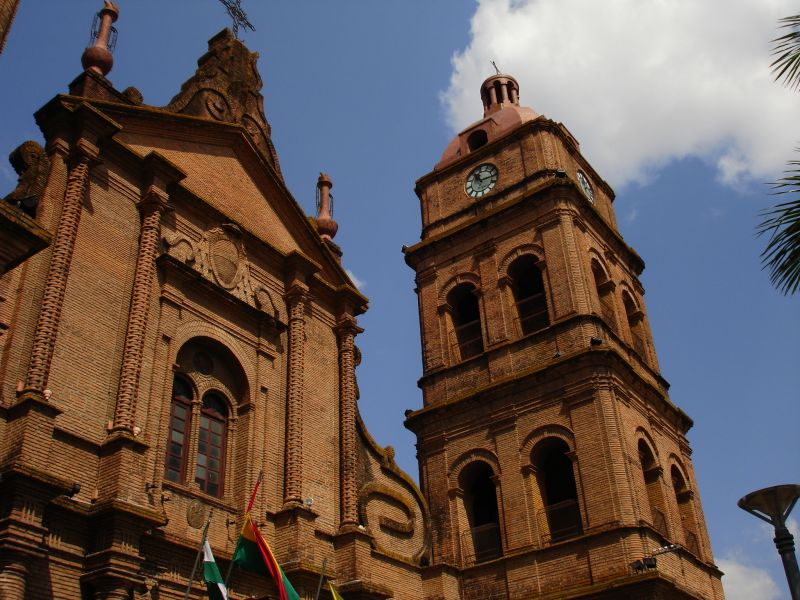
Tower and facade
