= Fernando de la Mora =

Fernando de la Mora may refer to:

- Fernando de la Mora, Paraguay, a city in the Central Department of Paraguay
- Club Fernando de la Mora, a football club in Asunción, Paraguay
- Fernando de la Mora (tenor) (born 1958), Mexican operatic tenor
- Fernando de la Mora (politician) (1773–1835), one of the founding fathers of Paraguay
