= São Lourenço =

São Lourenço may refer to several places:

== Brazil ==
- São Lourenço, Minas Gerais, a town in Brazil
- São Lourenço (Niterói), a neighborhood of the city of Niterói, Brazil
- São Lourenço da Mata, Pernambuco
- São Lourenço da Serra, São Paulo
- São Lourenço do Oeste, Santa Catarina
- São Lourenço do Piauí, Piauí
- São Lourenço do Sul, Rio Grande do Sul

== Portugal ==
- São Lourenço (Portalegre), a parish in the municipality of Portalegre, Portugal
- São Lourenço (Setúbal), a parish in the municipality of Setúbal, Portugal
- São Lourenço, a village in the Parish of Pêra, Portugal

== Other places ==
- São Lourenço, Cape Verde, a village and cove in the island of Fogo, Cape Verde
- São Lourenço (São Filipe), a parish on the island of Fogo, Cape Verde
- São Lourenço, Macau, a parish in the territory of Macau

== See also ==
- Saint Lawrence (c. 225–258), one of the seven deacons of ancient Rome
