= San Lorenzo District, Jauja =

Coordinates: 11.8468°S 75.3874°W

San Lorenzo District
- District
- Interactive map of San Lorenzo District
- Country: Peru
- Region: Junín
- Province: Jauja
- Founded: October 21, 1942
- Capital: San Lorenzo

Government
  - Mayor: Roni David Camarena Quinto

Area
  - Total: 22.15 km^{2} (8.55 sq mi)
- Elevation: 3,322 m (10,899 ft)

Population (2005 census)
  - Total: 2,352
  - Density: 106.2/km^{2} (275.0/sq mi)
- Time zone: UTC-5 (PET)
- UBIGEO: 120428

San Lorenzo District is one of thirty-four districts of the Jauja Province, located in the Department of Junín in Peru. The district was created by the Law No. 9631 in October 21, 1942, during the first term of President Manuel Prado Ugarteche.
