= St. Lawrence University (disambiguation) =

St. Lawrence University is a private liberal arts college in Canton, New York, United States.

St. Lawrence University may also refer to:

- St. Lawrence University (Uganda), Kampala, Uganda
- St. Lawrence Saints, the athletic teams representing St. Lawrence University

== See also ==
- St. Lawrence University–Old Campus Historic District, a historic district centred on St. Lawrence University
