= St. Lorenz Basilica =

Church in Kempten, Bavaria, Germany

Coordinates: 47°43′43″N 10°18′42″E

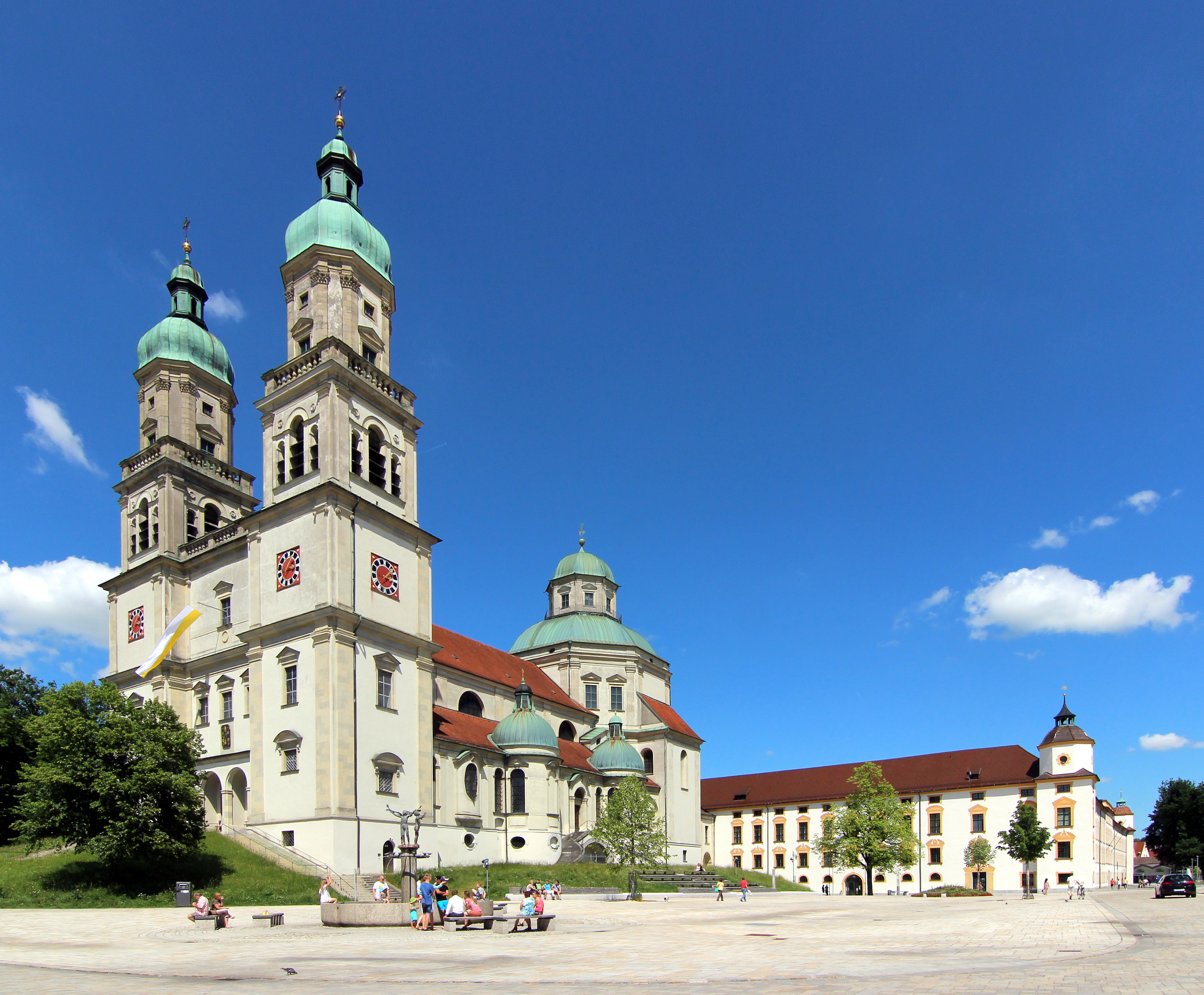
The exterior of St. Lorenz Basilica

St. Lorenz Basilica is a baroque minor basilica in Kempten, Bavaria, named after the Christian martyr Lawrence of Rome. It is the former abbey church of the Benedictine Kempten Abbey. It is currently used as the parish church of the Roman Catholic parish of St. Lawrence in the Diocese of Augsburg.

== History ==
There is evidence of a first church from the eighth century and the three-nave late Gothic parish church "St. Lorenz muff Berg" on the hill of the Basilika St. Lorenz, built on the site in the 13th century but burned down in 1478.

In 1632, during the Thirty Years' War, the monastery and church were looted and destroyed by the Swedes and the citizens of the nearby imperial city of Kempten.

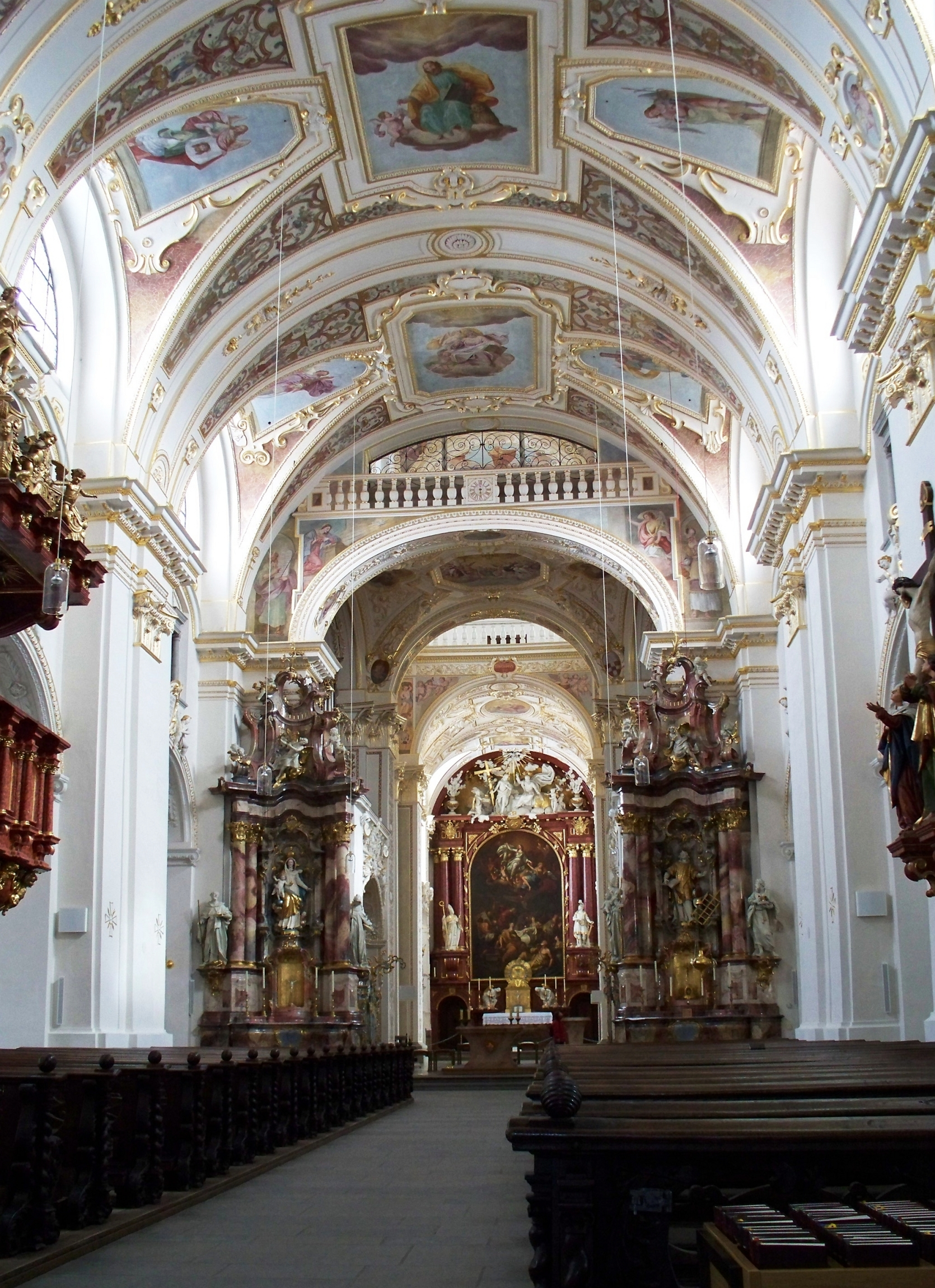
Church interior

Prince-Abbot Roman Giel von Gielsberg commissioned the master builder Michael Beer of Vorarlberg to build a new church to serve the parish and monastery. The foundation stone of the Basilica of St. Lawrence was laid on April 13, 1652. This was one of the first large churches built in Germany after the end of the Thirty Years' War. The building included a residence for the Prince-abbots.

Beer built the nave, the ground floor of the towers, and the choir. He was succeeded by Johann Serro on March 24, 1654. Benefactress Hildegard of the Vinzgau is commemorated in one of the ceiling paintings. The Nikolausaltar is in the north aisle. The church was consecrated on May 12, 1748.

In 1803, the monastery was dissolved, and the church became a purely parish church.

In 1900, the twin towers were finally completed. They were built of concrete, which was heavier than the material used before that time. Cracks at the connections to the main building are the result of the completed towers.

In 1969, Pope Paul VI bestowed the honorary title of basilica minor.

In December and January, the Bründl Baroque nativity scene can be viewed on selected dates in the crypt below the choir of the Basilika.
