= Sankt Lorenzen =

Sankt Lorenzen may refer to the following places:

== Styria (Austria) ==
- Sankt Lorenzen am Wechsel
- Sankt Lorenzen bei Knittelfeld
- Sankt Lorenzen bei Scheifling
- Sankt Lorenzen im Mürztal

== Italy ==
- St. Lorenzen (It. : San Lorenzo di Sebato), in Trentino-Alto Adige/Südtirol

== See also ==
- St. Lorenz, a municipality in Upper Austria
