= Élisabeth Chaplin =

French painter (1890–1982)

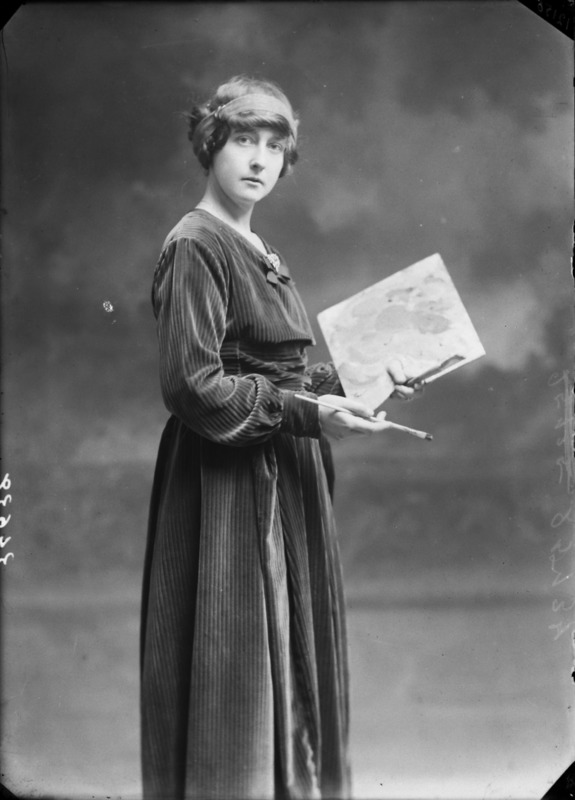
- Born: 17 October 1890; Fontainebleau, France
- Died: 28 January 1982 (aged 91); Fiesole, Italy
- Occupation: Artist
- Years active: 1905 - 1982
- Style: Les Nabis

Élisabeth Chaplin (17 October 1890 – 28 January 1982) was a French/Tuscan painter in the Nabis style.

She is known for her portraiture and Tuscan landscapes, most of which reside in the Pitti Palace’s Gallery of Modern Art collection in Florence. She has two self-portraits in the Vasari Corridor collection.

== Family influences ==
Chaplin came from a family of painters and sculptors. Her mother was Marguerite de Bavier-Chauffour, a poet and sculptor. Her uncle was Charles Joshua Chaplin, a French painter and engraver. Charles Chaplin conducted art classes specifically for women at his studio. The American artist Mary Cassatt and the English artist Louise Jopling were among Charles Chaplin's students. He died when Elisabeth Chaplin was a baby.

== Early life ==
In 1900 Elisabeth’s family moved to Italy, first to Piemonte and afterwards to Savona in Liguria. It was there that she started to teach herself to paint, with no formal training. When the Chaplin family took up residence at the Villa Rossi in Fiesole in 1905, Elisabeth had the chance to visit Francesco Gioli’s studio and meet painter Giovanni Fattori.

Chaplin’s visits to the Uffizi Museum were decisive. She learned from copying the classics. From 1905-1908, she painted her first large canvases and in 1910 her "Ritratto di Famiglia" (Family Portrait) won a gold medal from the Florence Society of Fine Arts (displayed in the Gallery of Modern Art, Florence). In 1916 she moved with her family to Rome, where she would live until 1922. There she met Paul-Albert Besnard (1849-1934), a French painter and printmaker, who in 1913, was appointed to be the director of Villa Medici in Rome. He became one of Chaplin's mentors.

She participated in the Venice Biennale in 1914 and in the Paris Salon in 1922 and thereafter. She befriended French author André Gide and followed painter Maurice Denis, founder of the Nabis movement, whom she met in Florence in 1912.

== Before World War II ==
From 1922 to 1930s, Chaplin lived at Villa Il Treppiede with her mother and life-long companion Ida Capecchi. Her nephew Robert Chaplin, a young and promising artist, lived with them from 1927 until his death from muscular dystrophy at age eleven in 1937.

Chaplin produced numerous portraits and frescoes during this time. She socialized with painters Giovanni Fattori and Luigi and Francesco Gioli, and art collector Bernard Bereson.

== Return to France ==
From the mid 1930s until the early 1950s, Chaplin lived in Paris. She received civil commissions to produce decorative tapestries such as Summer and Autumn for the École Professionelle of Metz, France (1936–37) and murals for Paris churches Notre-Dame-du Salut and Saint-Esprit. In 1937, she won a gold medal at the International Exhibition in Paris and in 1938, she was awarded the French Legion of Honor.

== Return to Tuscany ==
She returned to Villa Il Treppiede in Fiesole after the war and moved back permanently in the early 1950s. She continued to paint landscapes and portraits, many of family members and loved ones.

In 1946, the Uffizi Gallery acquired three of her paintings and requested a donation from the artist of her young Self-portrait with a Green Umbrella that now hangs in the Vasari Corridor.

During her lifetime there a number of major retrospectives in Florence of her work: Palazzo Strozzi (1946), Academy of Arts and Design (1956), and French Institute (1965).

Several of her works are on display in the national Gallery of Modern Art in Rome.

Chaplin donated her entire body of works (and those of her mother and nephew) to Florence. Fifteen of her paintings are on show at Palazzo Pitti's Modern Art Gallery, while almost 700 (paintings and sketches) are in storage.

She died in Fiesole in 1982.
