= Gioli =

Gioli is an Italian surname. Notable people with the surname include:

- Francesco Gioli (1846–1922), Italian painter
- Luigi Gioli (1854–1947), Italian painter
- Matilde Gioli (born 1989), Italian actress
- Simona Gioli (born 1977), Italian volleyball player
