= Ripoli =

Ripoli may refer to:

- Bagno a Ripoli, a municipality in the Metropolitan city of Florence, Italy
- Ripoli, Cascina, a village in the province of Pisa, Italy
- Ripoli, Corropoli, a village in the province of Teramo, Italy
- Ripoli, Dronero, a village in the province of Cuneo, Italy
- Ripoli, San Benedetto Val di Sambro, a village in the Metropolitan city of Bologna, Italy
