= Saint-Sixte =

Saint-Sixte may refer to the following places:

- Saint-Sixte, Loire, a commune in the Loire department, France
- Saint-Sixte, Lot-et-Garonne, a commune in the Lot-et-Garonne department, France
- Saint-Sixte, Quebec, Canada

== See also ==
- Sixte (disambiguation)
- Saint Sixtus (disambiguation)
