= San Prospero (disambiguation) =

San Prospero is a municipality in Modena, Emilia-Romagna, Italy.

San Prospero may also refer to the following churches in Italy:

- San Prospero, Cascina, Pisa, Tuscany
- San Prospero, Perugia, Umbria
- San Prospero, Reggio Emilia, Emilia-Romagna

== See also ==
- Prosper of Reggio (died c. 466), Italian saint
