= Laiano =

Laiano may refer to:

- Laiano, Cascina, a village in the province of Pisa, Italy
- Laiano, Sant'Agata de' Goti, a village in the province of Benevento, Italy
