= Titignano =

Titignano may refer to:

- Titignano, Cascina, a village in the province of Pisa, Italy
- Titignano, Orvieto, a village in the province of Terni, Italy
