= Sisto =

Sisto can refer to:

- San Sisto, "Saint Sixtus", dedication of several Italian churches
- Sisto, character on The Brak Show
- Jeremy Sisto, American actor
- José Sisto, Spanish politician, Governor of Guam
- Meadow Sisto, American actress
- Pione Sisto, Ugandan-born Danish footballer of South Sudanese origin
- Rocco Sisto, Italian actor
- Sister Sisto, a character from the animated series Solar Opposites
