= Sixtus =

Sixtus is a Roman name, a corruption of the Greek name "Ξυστος", meaning "polished", and originally Latinized "Xystus". Its Spanish form is Sixto.

- Sixtus of Reims (d. c. 300), bishop of Reims
- Sixtus of Esztergom (d. 1285/86), Hungarian clergyman
- Sixtus of Siena (1520–1569), Jewish Roman Catholic theologian
- Prince Sixtus of Bourbon-Parma (1886–1934)
- Albert Sixtus (1892–1960), German children's writer
- Edmund Sixtus Muskie (1914–1996), 58th United States Secretary of State 1980–81
- Prince Sixtus Henry of Bourbon-Parma (born 1940)
- Sixtus Lanner (1934–2022), Austrian politician
- Sixtus Leung Chung-hang (born 1986), Hong Kong activist and politician

== See also ==
- Pope Sixtus (disambiguation)
- Saint Sixtus (disambiguation)
- Sixtus Affair
