= Marciana (disambiguation) =

Marciana is a town in the province of Livorno, Italy.

Marciana, a feminine and adjectival form of the names Mark or Marcus etc., can also refer to:

== People ==
- Ulpia Marciana, sister of the Roman Emperor Trajan, posthumously deified as diva Marciana
- Paccia Marciana, first wife of the Roman Emperor Lucius Septimius Severus
- Marciana of Mauretania, martyr and saint
- Saint Marciana the Queen, wife of Emperor Justin I (518–527)

== Places ==
- Marciana, Cascina, village in the province of Pisa, Italy
- Marciana Marina, town in the province of Livorno, Italy
- Biblioteca Marciana, historic library and building in Venice
- Marciana (Lycia), a town in ancient Lycia
