= Sixte =

Sixte may refer to:

- Saint-Sixte, Loire, commune in the Loire department in central France
- Saint-Sixte, Lot-et-Garonne, commune in the Lot-et-Garonne department in southwestern France
- Saint-Sixte, Quebec, small town in the region of Outaouais, Quebec, Canada
- Sixte Coupal dit la Reine (1825–1891), Quebec farmer and political figure
