= Santi Ippolito e Cassiano, San Casciano =

Church building in Cascina, Italy

Parish church of Saints Ippolito and Cassiano
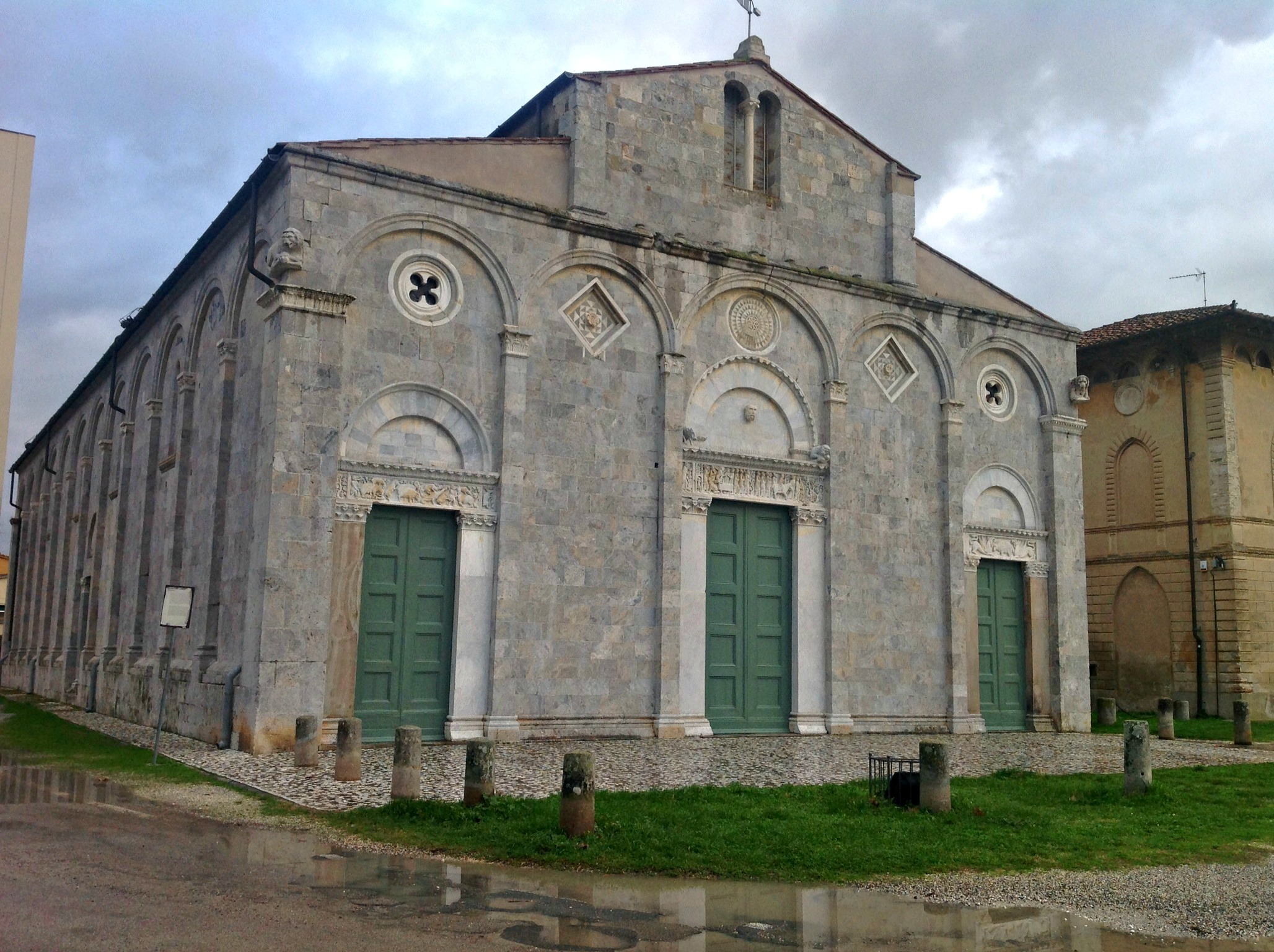
- Parish church of Saints Ippolito and Cassiano

- Location within Italy
- 43°41′N 10°33′E
- Location: San Casciano, Cascina
- Country: Italy
- Denomination: Roman Catholic

Architecture
- Architect: Biduino
- Style: Pisan Romanesque

Administration
- Archdiocese: Pisa

Santi Ippolito e Cassiano (Pieve dei Santi Ippolito e Cassiano) is located in San Casciano, a village in the municipality of Cascina, Tuscany, Italy.

It is recorded in a document dated April 12, 970, being part of the Archives of the Roman Catholic Archdiocese of Pisa and probably also in another document dating back to June, in the year 857.
