= San Lorenzo a Pagnatico =

- Frazione
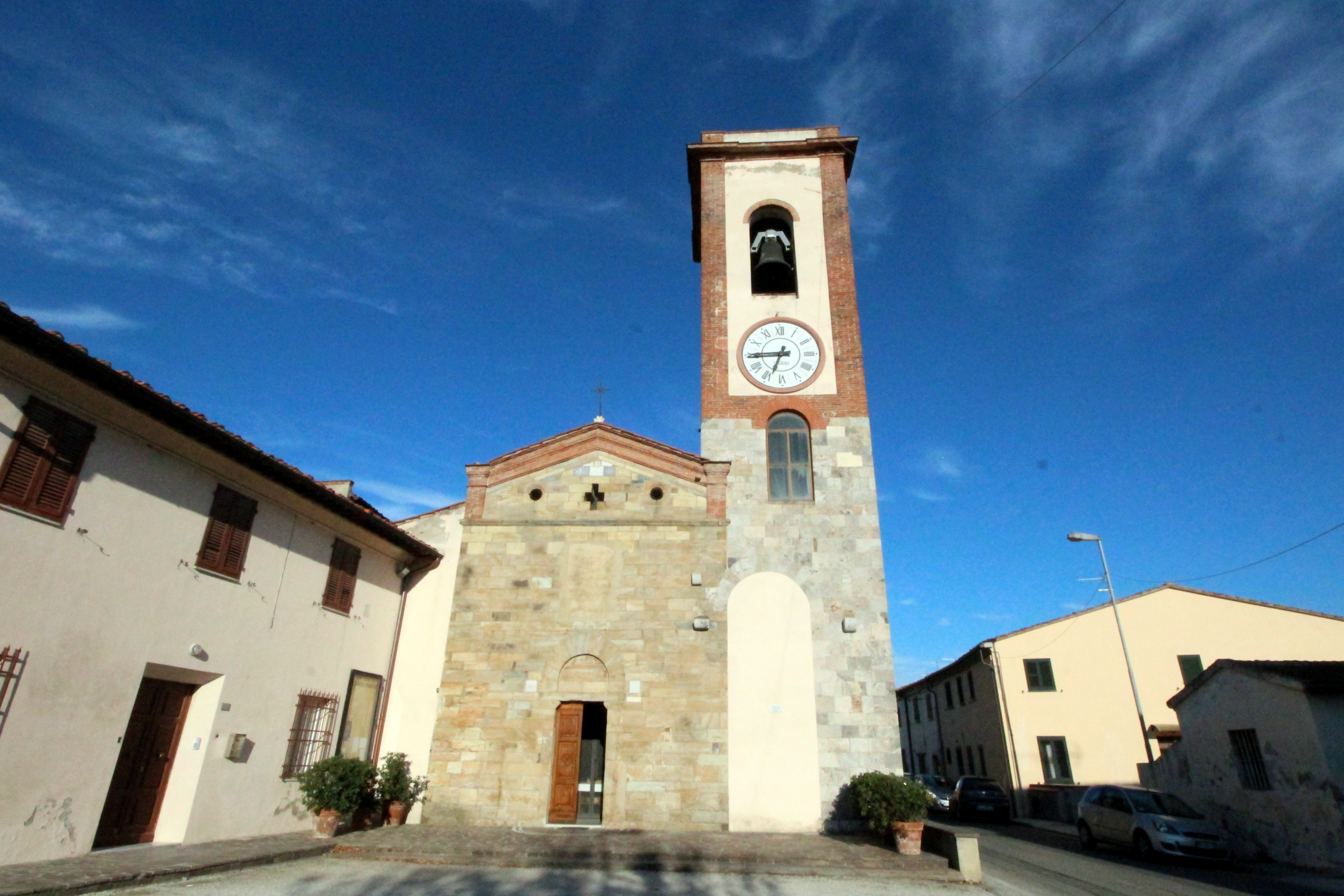
- The church of San Lorenzo

- Location of San Lorenzo a Pagnatico in Italy
- Coordinates: 43°40′35″N 10°29′57″E
- Country: Italy
- Region: Tuscany
- Province: Pisa (PI)
- Comune: Cascina
- Elevation: 3 m (9.8 ft)

Population
  - Total: 1,380
- Demonym: Sanlorenzini
- Time zone: UTC+1 (CET)
  - Summer (DST): UTC+2 (CEST)
- Postal code: 56023
- Dialing code: (+39) 050

San Lorenzo a Pagnatico is a village in Tuscany, central Italy, administratively a frazione of the comune of Cascina, province of Pisa.

San Lorenzo a Pagnatico is about 14 km from Pisa and 5 km from Cascina.

== Bibliography ==
- Caciagli, Giuseppe (1972). Pisa e la sua provincia. Vol. 2. Pisa: Colombo Cursi Editore.
