= Latignano =

- Frazione
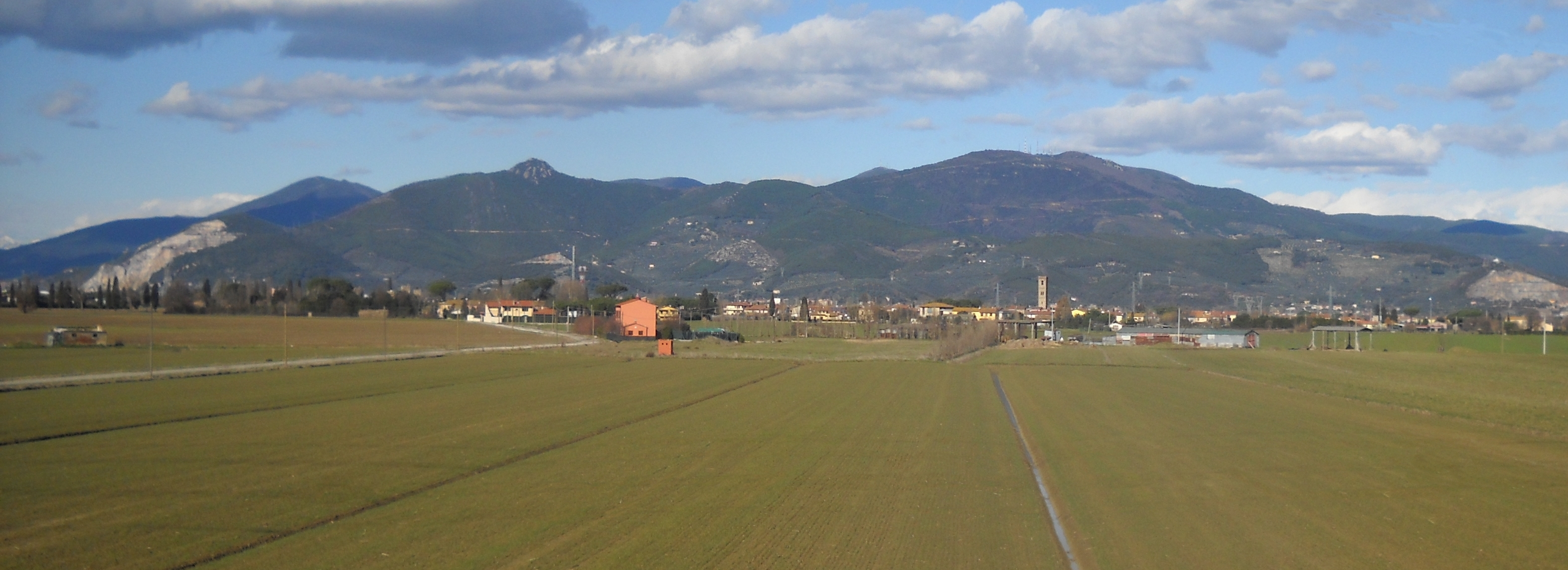

- Location of Latignano in Italy
- Coordinates: 43°39′14″N 10°33′28″E
- Country: Italy
- Region: Tuscany
- Province: Pisa (PI)
- Comune: Cascina
- Elevation: 7 m (23 ft)

Population (2011)
  - Total: 775
- Demonym: Latignanesi
- Time zone: UTC+1 (CET)
  - Summer (DST): UTC+2 (CEST)
- Postal code: 56021
- Dialing code: (+39) 050

Latignano is a village in Tuscany, central Italy, administratively a frazione of the comune of Cascina, province of Pisa. At the time of the 2001 census its population was 556.

Latignano is about 18 km from Pisa and 4 km from Cascina.
