= Zambra, Cascina =

Zambra
- Frazione
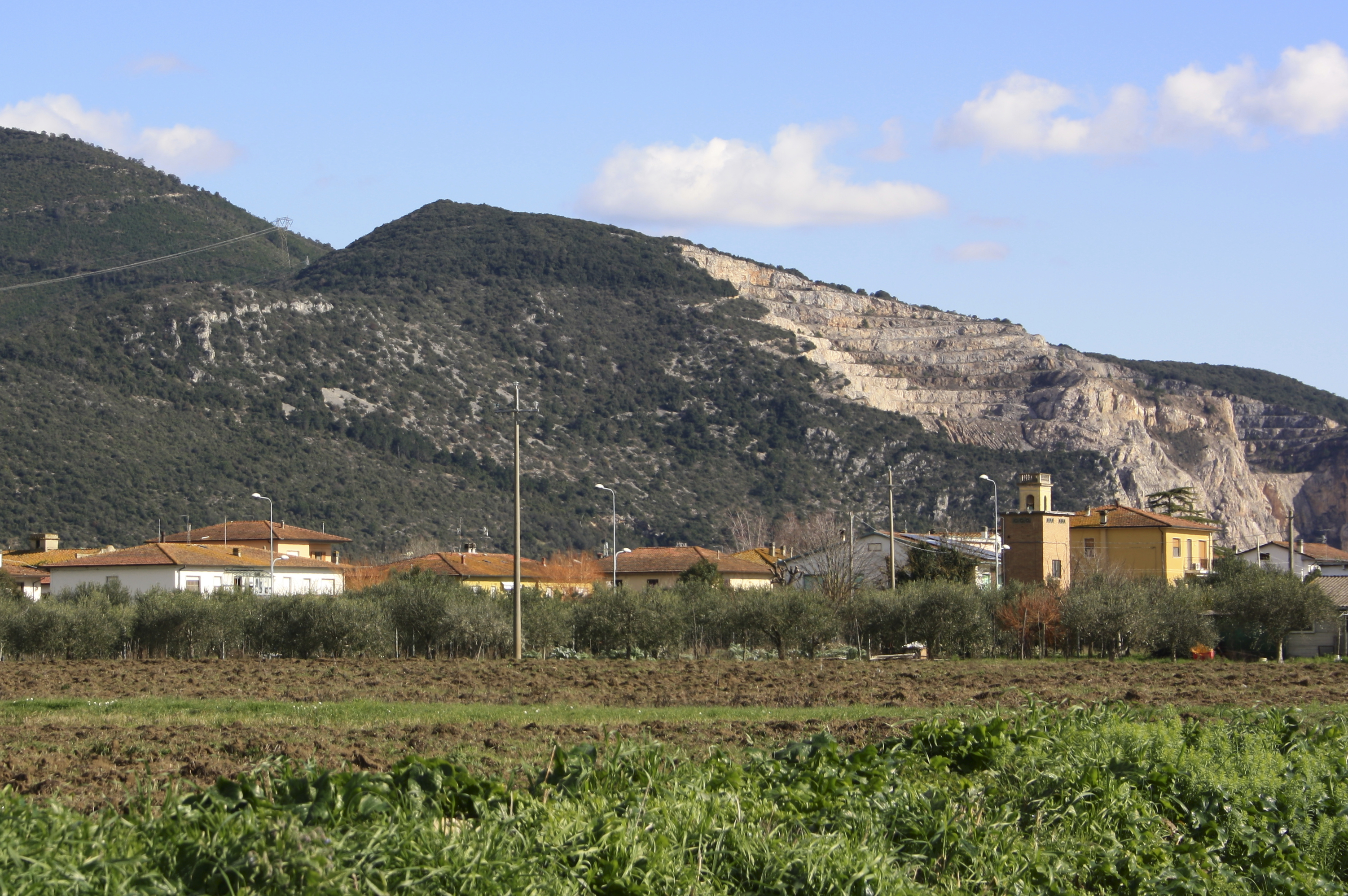

- Location of Zambra in Italy
- Coordinates: 43°42′6″N 10°29′49″E
- Country: Italy
- Region: Tuscany
- Province: Pisa (PI)
- Comune: Cascina
- Elevation: 6 m (20 ft)

Population
  - Total: 890
- Demonym: Zambrigiani
- Time zone: UTC+1 (CET)
  - Summer (DST): UTC+2 (CEST)
- Postal code: 56023
- Dialing code: (+39) 050

Zambra is a village in Tuscany, central Italy, administratively a frazione of the comune of Cascina, province of Pisa.

Zambra is about 12 km from Pisa and 7 km from Cascina, located alongside the river Arno. The village shares its name with a little stream flowing down from Calci into the Arno.

== Bibliography ==
- Caciagli, Giuseppe (1972). Pisa e la sua provincia. Vol. 2. Pisa: Colombo Cursi Editore.
