= Saint Sixtus =

Saint Sixtus (or San Sisto in Italian) may refer to the following:

== People ==
- Pope Sixtus I (d. 128)
- Pope Sixtus II (d. 258), martyr
- Pope Sixtus III (d. 440)
- Sixtus of Reims (d.c. 300), first bishop of Reims

== Places ==
=== Italy ===
- San Sisto, Piacenza, church in Piacenza
- San Sisto, Pisa, church in Pisa
- San Sisto Vecchio, church in Rome
- San Sisto, Viterbo, church in Lazio
- San Sisto (Genoa), church in Genoa
- San Sisto al Pino, village in the province of Pisa

=== Belgium ===
- St. Sixtus' Abbey, Westvleteren, West Flanders

=== Australia ===
- San Sisto College, Brisbane

== See also ==
- Sixtus (disambiguation)
- Saint-Sixte (disambiguation)
