= Santo Stefano a Macerata =

- Frazione
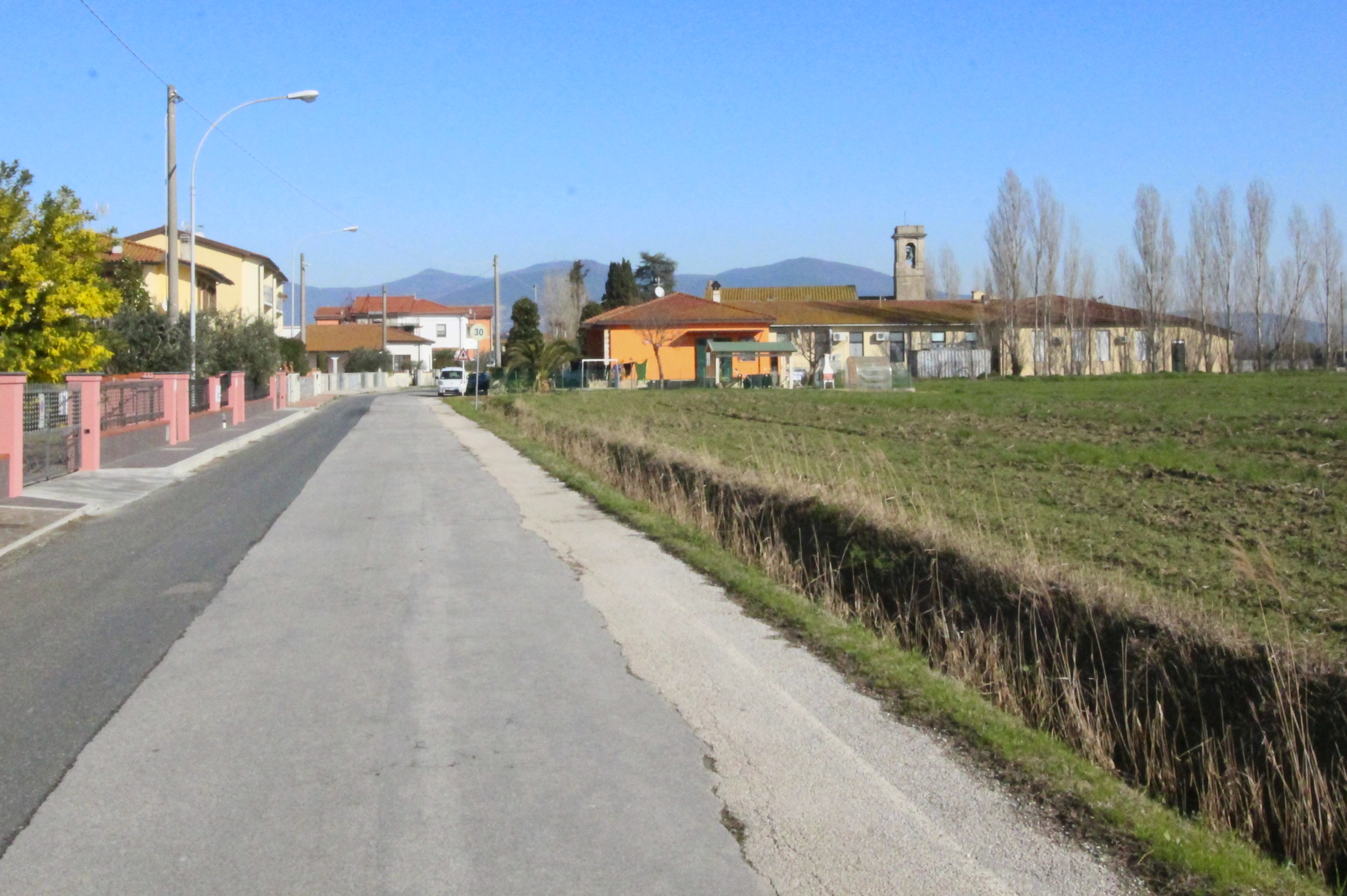

- Location of Santo Stefano a Macerata in Italy
- Coordinates: 43°39′30″N 10°30′20″E
- Country: Italy
- Region: Tuscany
- Province: Pisa (PI)
- Comune: Cascina
- Elevation: 4 m (13 ft)

Population
  - Total: 351
- Time zone: UTC+1 (CET)
  - Summer (DST): UTC+2 (CEST)
- Postal code: 56021
- Dialing code: (+39) 050

Santo Stefano a Macerata is a village in Tuscany, central Italy. It is administratively a frazione of the comune of Cascina, province of Pisa. At the 2001 census, its population was 86.

The village is located about 20 kilometres (12 mi) from Pisa and 7 kilometres (4.3 mi) from Cascina. The main hamlet of the frazione is called Chiesanuova.

== Science ==
The frazione is home to the European Gravitational Observatory and the Virgo interferometer, one of the few facilities in the world dedicated to the detection and study of gravitational waves.

== See also ==
- Virgo interferometer
