= Cascina =

- Comune
- Comune di Cascina
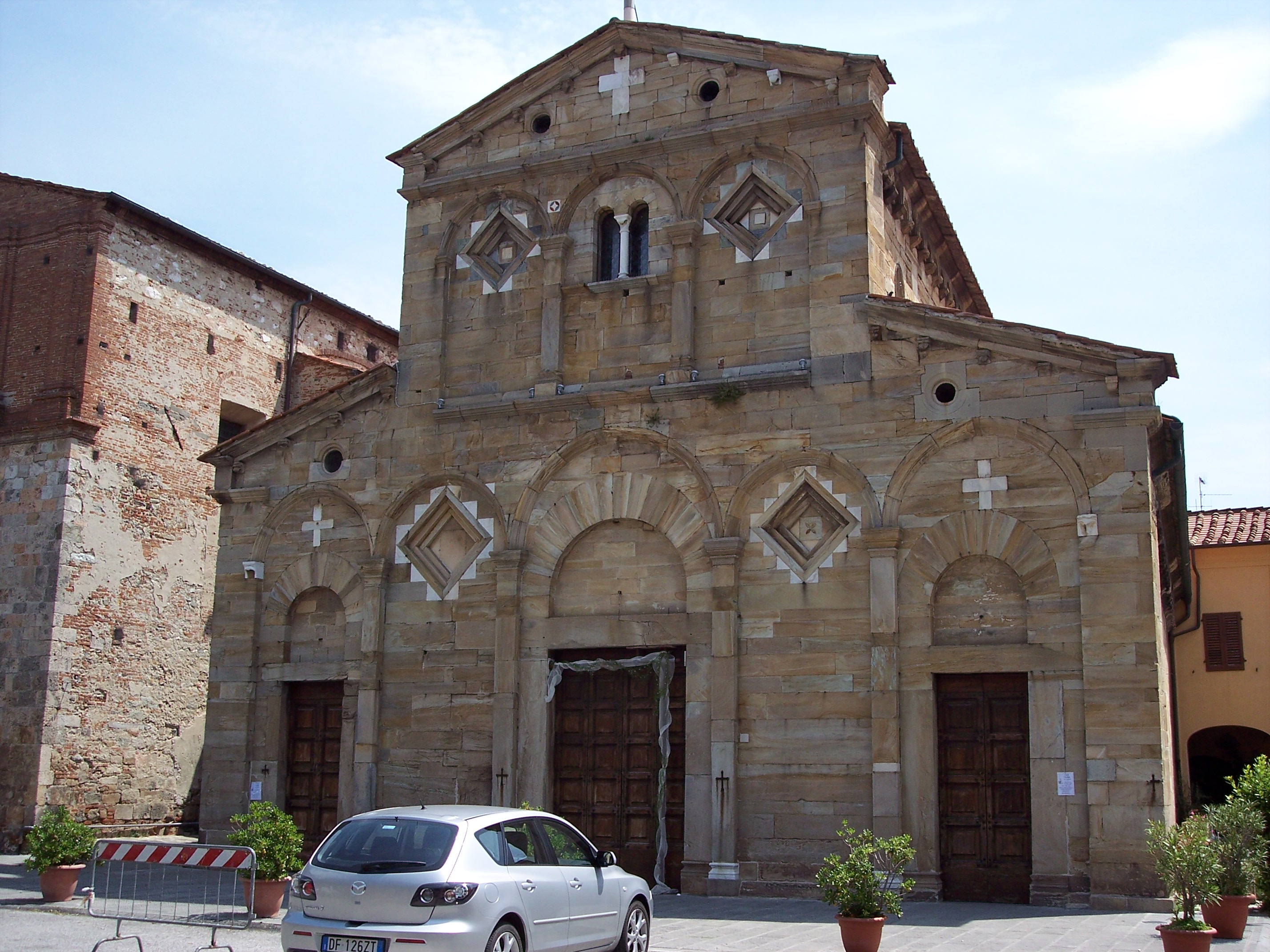
- Pieve di Santa Maria in Cascina

- Coat of arms

- Location within Italy Location within Tuscany
- Coordinates: 43°41′N 10°33′E
- Country: Italy
- Region: Tuscany
- Province: Pisa (PI)
- Frazioni: Arnaccio, Casciavola, Laiano, Latignano, Marciana, Montione, Musigliano, Navacchio, Pettori, Ripoli, San Benedetto, San Casciano, San Frediano a Settimo, San Giorgio a Bibbiano, San Lorenzo a Pagnatico, San Lorenzo alle Corti, San Prospero, San Sisto al Pino, Santo Stefano a Macerata, Titignano, Visignano, Zambra

Government
  - Mayor: Michelangelo Betti (Partito Democratico)

Area
  - Total: 79.2 km^{2} (30.6 sq mi)
- Elevation: 8 m (26 ft)

Population (31 May 2017)
  - Total: 45,373
  - Density: 573/km^{2} (1,480/sq mi)
- Demonym: Cascinesi
- Time zone: UTC+1 (CET)
  - Summer (DST): UTC+2 (CEST)
- Postal code: 56021
- Dialing code: 050
- Patron saint: Sts. Innocent and Florentinus
- Saint day: Tuesday after the last Sunday of May
- Website: Official website

Cascina (Italian pronunciation: [ˈkaʃʃina]) is a comune (municipality) in the Province of Pisa in the Italian region Tuscany, located about 60 kilometres (37 mi) west of Florence and about 13 kilometres (8 mi) southeast of Pisa.

Cascina is located on the left shore of the Arno River, on a markedly plain terrain. The comune borders the following municipalities: Calcinaia, Collesalvetti, Crespina, Casciana Terme Lari, Pisa, Pontedera, San Giuliano Terme, Vicopisano.

== History ==
The first mention of Cascina is from a document of 750 AD. The origin of the name is still uncertain, but it could derive from Casina ("Small House"), or from the creek that crossed it (now disappeared), or from an Etruscan personal name, Latinized as Cassenius.

On 26 July 1364, the eponymous battle between the armies of Pisa and Florence was fought here. The event was later reproduced by Michelangelo in painting, of which now preparatory drawings and a copy by Aristotile da Sangallo (also known as Bastiano da Sangallo) exist. The city had in fact a strategical importance as a fortified stronghold on the main road connecting the two cities.

== Geography ==
Frazioni

The municipality is formed by the municipal seat of Cascina and the villages (frazioni) of Arnaccio, Casciavola, Laiano, Latignano, Marciana, Montione, Musigliano, Navacchio, Pettori, Ripoli, San Benedetto, San Casciano, San Frediano a Settimo, San Giorgio a Bibbiano, San Lorenzo a Pagnatico, San Lorenzo alle Corti, San Prospero, San Sisto al Pino, Santo Stefano a Macerata, Titignano, Visignano and Zambra.

== Main sights ==
- Medieval walls
- Castle of Ripoli
- Pieve di Santa Maria
- Oratorio di San Giovanni
- Church of the Madonna dell'Acqua (Madonna of the Water)
- Parish church of Saints Ippolito and Cassiano

In the village of Zambra there is a 9th-century church with unusual wall paintings of fish in pre-Romanesque style. At San Casciano, a frazione with c. 3,000 inhabitants, is a basilica, renovated in the 12th century in Pisane-Gothic style.

The frazione of Marciana has the church of San Miniato (10th century). At Montione is found the Abbey of San Savino.

== Infrastructure ==
The frazione of Santo Stefano a Macerata is home to the European Gravitational Observatory and the Virgo interferometer, one of the few facilities in the World for the search for gravitational waves.

== Twin towns - Sister cities ==
Cascina is twinned with:

- Umm Dreiga, Western Sahara
- Sebnitz, Germany
- Saliès, France, since 2007
