= Pettori =

- Frazione
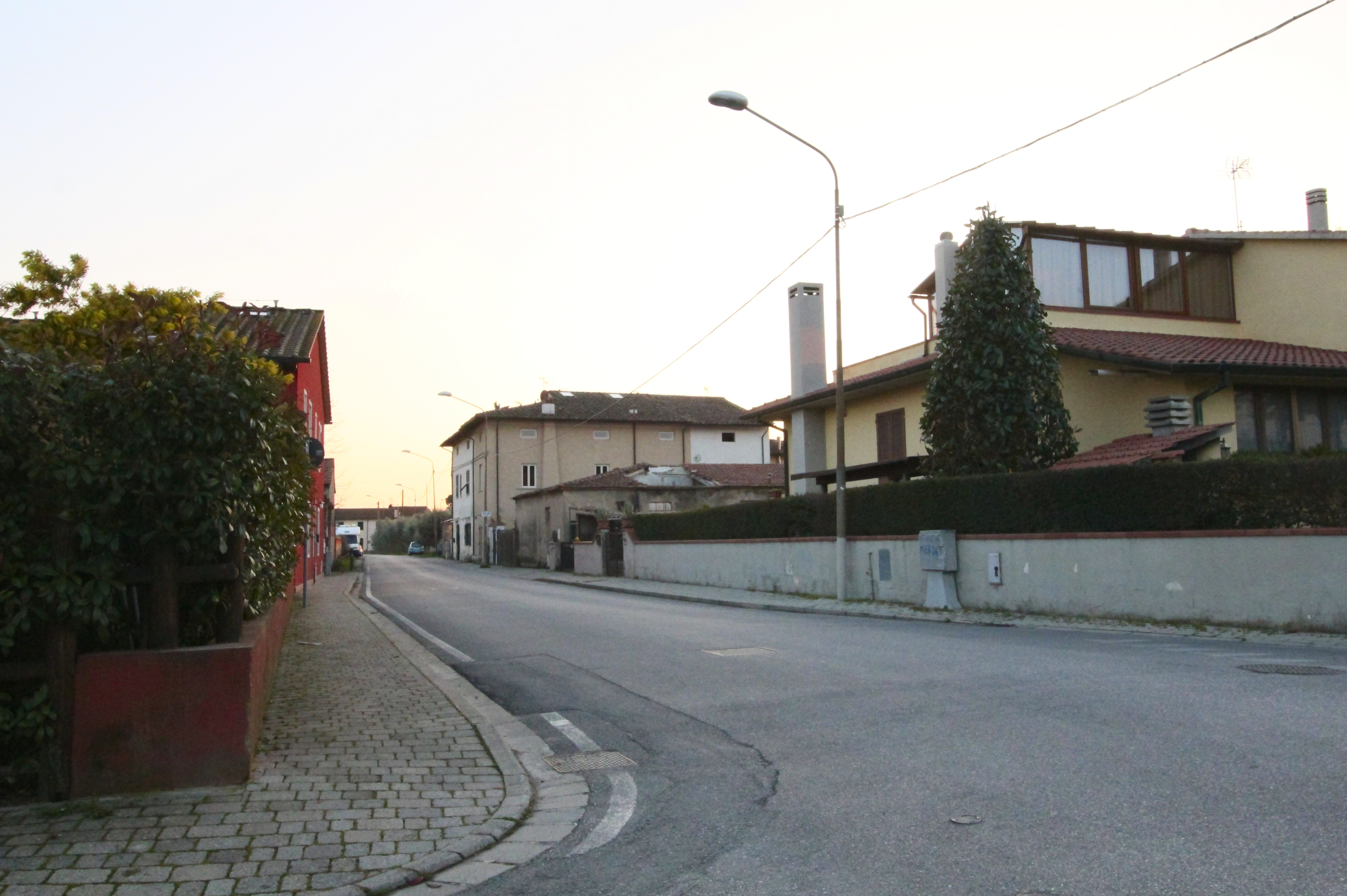

- Location of Pettori in Italy
- Coordinates: 43°42′7″N 10°27′40″E
- Country: Italy
- Region: Tuscany
- Province: Pisa (PI)
- Comune: Cascina
- Elevation: 4 m (13 ft)

Population
  - Total: 1,200
- Demonym: Pettoresi
- Time zone: UTC+1 (CET)
  - Summer (DST): UTC+2 (CEST)
- Postal code: 56023
- Dialing code: (+39) 050

Pettori is a village in Tuscany, central Italy, administratively a frazione of the comune of Cascina, province of Pisa.

Pettori is about 8 km from Pisa and 10 km from Cascina.

== Bibliography ==
- Caciagli, Giuseppe (1972). Pisa e la sua provincia. Vol. 2. Pisa: Colombo Cursi Editore.
