= San Casciano, Cascina =

San Casciano
- Frazione
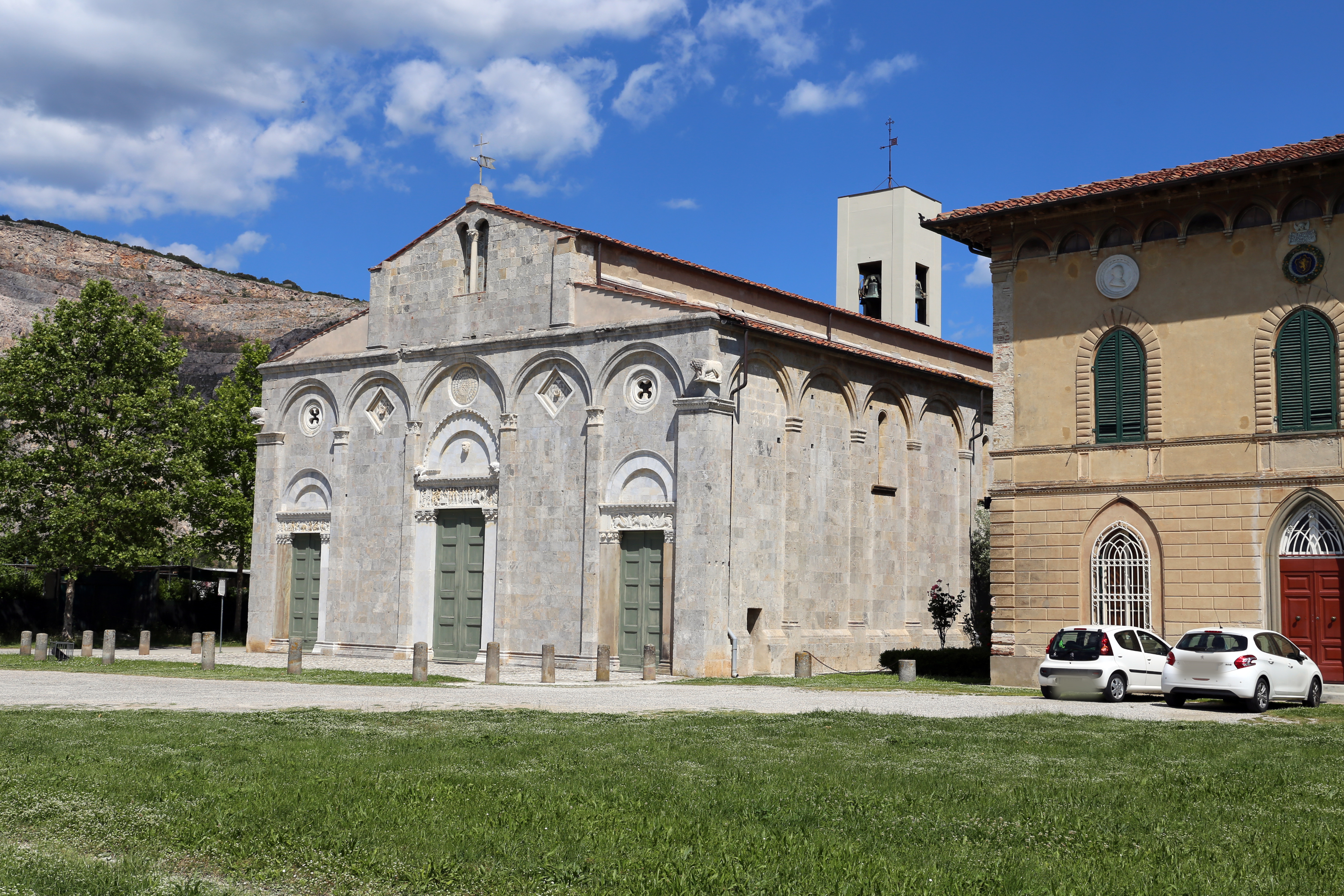
- The pieve of Santi Ippolito e Cassiano

- Location of San Casciano in Italy
- Coordinates: 43°41′25″N 10°31′00″E
- Country: Italy
- Region: Tuscany
- Province: Pisa (PI)
- Comune: Cascina
- Elevation: 7 m (23 ft)

Population (2011)
  - Total: 248
- Demonym: Sancascianesi
- Time zone: UTC+1 (CET)
  - Summer (DST): UTC+2 (CEST)
- Postal code: 56023
- Dialing code: (+39) 050

San Casciano is a village in Tuscany, central Italy, administratively a frazione of the comune of Cascina, province of Pisa. At the time of the 2001 census its population was 249.

San Casciano is about 15 km from Pisa and 4 km from Cascina.

== Main sights ==
- Santi Ippolito e Cassiano
