= Arnaccio =

- Frazione
- Location of Arnaccio in Italy
- Coordinates: 43°38′40″N 10°26′59″E
- Country: Italy
- Region: Tuscany
- Province: Pisa (PI)
- Comune: Cascina
- Elevation: 2 m (6.6 ft)

Population (2011)
  - Total: 113
- Time zone: UTC+1 (CET)
  - Summer (DST): UTC+2 (CEST)
- Postal code: 56023
- Dialing code: (+39) 050

Arnaccio is a village in Tuscany, central Italy, administratively a frazione of the comune of Cascina, province of Pisa. At the time of the 2011 census its population was 113.

Arnaccio is about 12 km (7.5 mi) from Pisa and 10 km (6.2 mi) from Cascina.
