= Ripoli, Corropoli =

Coordinates: 42°49′34″N 13°53′24″E

Ripoli (Corropoli)
- Frazione
- Interactive map of Ripoli (Corropoli)
- Country: Italy
- Region: Abruzzo
- Province: Teramo
- Time zone: UTC+1 (CET)
  - Summer (DST): UTC+2 (CEST)

Ripoli (Corropoli) is a frazione in the Province of Teramo in the Abruzzo region of Italy.

== History ==
The village of Ripoli is a prehistoric settlement located on a river terrace on the left bank of the Vibrata River, near Corropoli in the province of Teramo. The site was first identified by Concezio Rosa around 1865, with initial systematic explorations conducted in approximately 1873. Rosa interpreted the site as a station-workshop, based on the large quantity of lithic artifacts recovered, including blades, arrowheads, and scrapers. In his essay Studies of Prehistory and History, he characterized other materials from the site as domestic remains, referring to them as "meal and kitchen remains."
