= Luigi Gioli =

Italian painter (1854–1947)

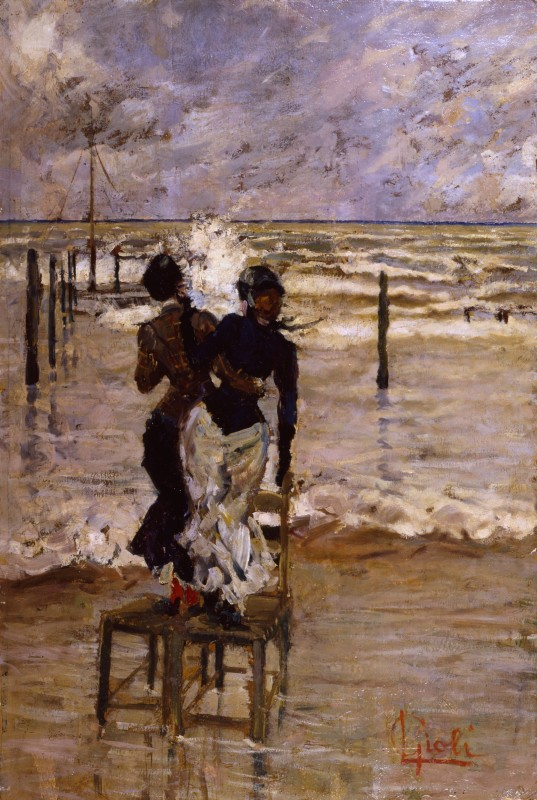
Signore in riva al mare, ca.1900 (Art collections of Fondazione Cariplo)

Luigi Gioli (16 November 1854 – 27 October 1947) was an Italian painter.

== Biography ==
He was born in San Frediano a Settimo. After graduating in law, Luigi Gioli was drawn to painting, following in the footsteps of his elder brother, Francesco. He came into contact with the Post-Macchiaioli painters, with whom he practised on subjects from rural life, mainly drawn from the Tuscan countryside.

On a trip to Paris in 1878, he became acquainted with the work of Edgar Degas, expanding his own repertoire with new themes taken from urban life and equestrian subjects. He remained attached to macchia painting, specialising in Maremma landscapes featuring animals, and it was this style that distinguished his work at the 1887 Esposizione d’Arte in Venice and the 1889 Exposition Universelle in Paris.

Towards the end of the 19th century Gioli went to the Adriatic coast to paint with his brother. He participated in the major Italian exhibitions at the beginning of the 20th century, in particular the Esposizione Universale in Rome in 1911. He died in 1947 in Florence.

== Sources ==
- Elena Lissoni, Luigi Gioli, online catalogue Artgate by Fondazione Cariplo, 2010, CC BY-SA (source for the first revision of this article).
