= Francesco Gioli =

Italian painter (1846–1922)

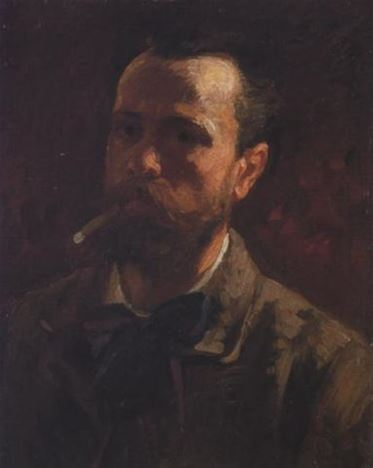
Self-portrait (1883)

Francesco Gioli (29 June 1846, San Frediano a Settimo – 4 February 1922, Florence) was an Italian painter and member of the Macchiaioli movement. His brother Luigi, was also a painter of some note.

== Biography ==
He was born to a wealthy family. His first studies were at the Accademia d'Arte di Pisa with Annibale Mariani (1840-1891), followed by the Accademia di Belle Arti di Firenze, under Antonio Ciseri and Enrico Pollastrini. He initially painted historical scenes. His depiction of Charles Emmanuel I, Duke of Savoy, dispatching the Spanish Ambassador (1868), was first exhibited in Florence, and awarded a prize at an exhibition in Pistoia.

In the early 1870s, he came under the influence of the Macchiaioli; especially Giovanni Fattori and Telemaco Signorini. He spent a considerable amount time painting and sketching in the Pisan countryside. During this time, he also began to exhibit regularly; throughout Italy and in Paris. While in Paris, he also came under the influence of the Barbizon school. His wife, Matilde, was the daughter of the statesman, Ferdinando Bartolommei. Their villa in Fauglia became a cultural gathering point.

In 1888, Francesco was named a Professor at the Accademia di Belle Arti di Bologna and, the following year, in Florence. In the 1890s, his works brightened and took on a nostalgic character. He also began exhibiting outside Europe; in Buenos Aires (1913), San Francisco, and Melbourne (both 1915). His largest showing was at the Venice Biennale of 1914.

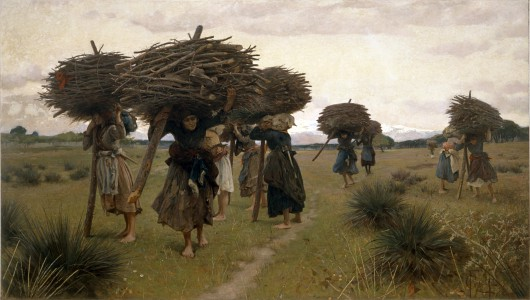
The Woodcutters of San Rossore

He is best known for rural scenes of grape harvesting. Among his paintings are Goldoni visits Rousseau (1869); dal Sola alle Renaiole, dalle Macchiaiole di San Rossore alla Vendemmia allegra; l'Autunno, and la Vendemmia (1885); il Tempo di Vendemmia (1886); il Ritornando dalla vendemmia (1889); nel Vendemmia allegra (1908). In 1872 he painted l'Acqua; a year later he painted La Portatrice d'acqua, depicting a young female water porter in the countryside. He also painted la Gioventù (1891), in Tuscan Peasant (1892), Tramonto a Castiglioncello; Sera di luna, Pesca a sciabica, Venditrice di arselle, and Renaioli. In 1909 he presented at Venice: Florentine Harmonies, four vedute of Florence.
