= San Prospero, Perugia =

Church in Perugia, Italy

Coordinates: 43°06′33″N 12°22′55″E

Chiesa of San Prospero
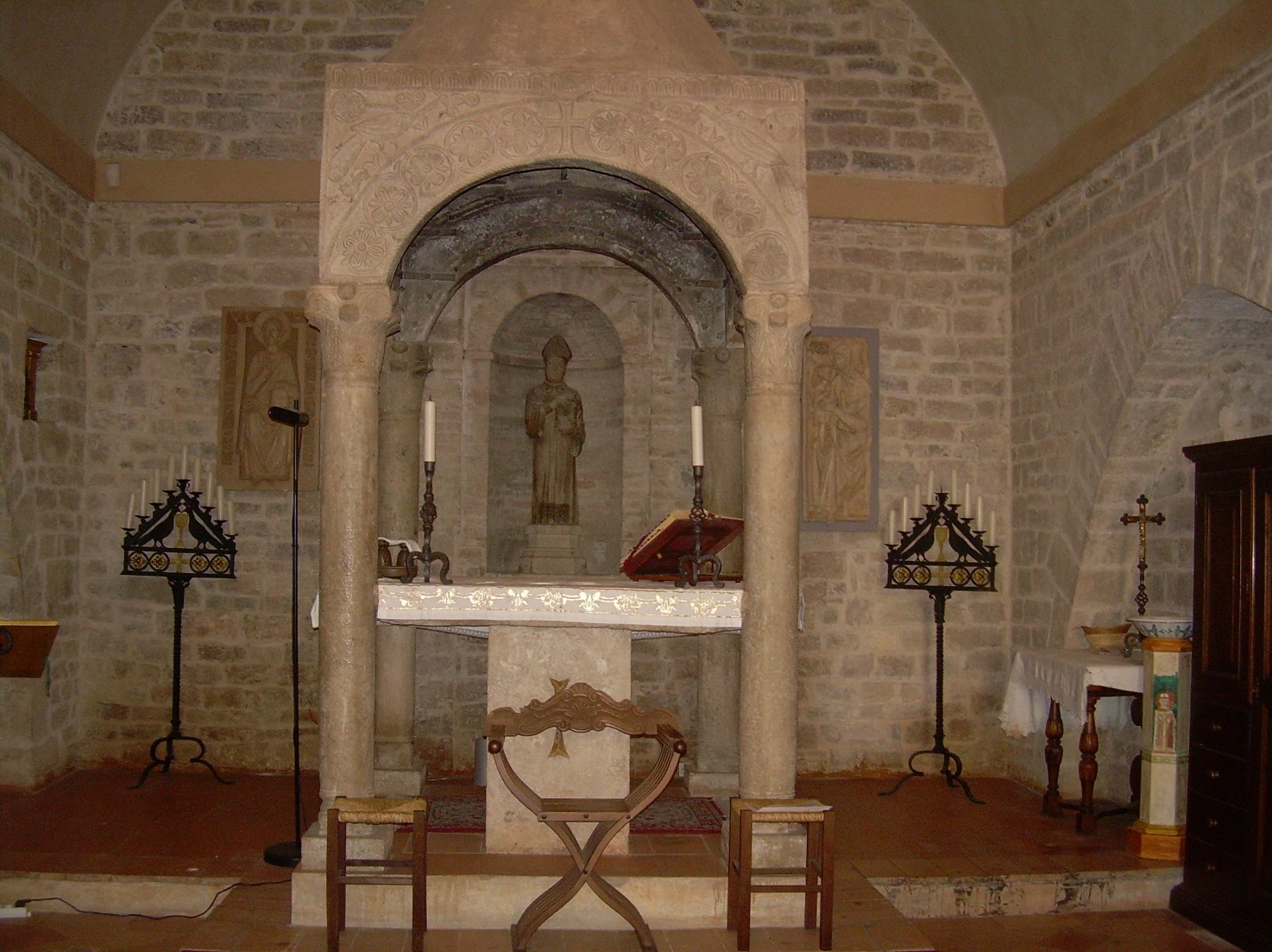
- Chiesa of San Prospero
- Location: Perugia
- Country: Italy
- Religious institute: Catholicism

Architecture
- Years built: 7th–8th century

Administration
- Diocese: Perugia

Chiesa di San Prospero ("Church of Saint Prosper") is a church in Perugia, Italy, located in Via San Prospero, 7, which dates back to the 7th and 8th centuries. It is located in the Porta Eburnea district outside the city walls. It is of importance for art history because it preserves the oldest frescoes in Perugia, dating to 1225.

== History and art ==
The first building was built between the 7th and 8th centuries on an Etruscan-Roman necropolis and was a female monastic settlement. In 1285 it became a parish church of Porta Eburnea. In 1303 it became dependent on the Cathedral chapter and in 1436 it on the Abbey of Pomposa. In the 16th century, due to the badly damaged roof, it became part of a larger building which is why it appears from the outside as a country house: up to the first half of the 20th century it was used as a farm outbuilding. During the renovation, the orientation of the nave was changed and traces of the temple walls are still visible in the back of the church. During the 17th century, it passed to the seminary and later to the priest of the mission; after that it passed to the Donini family. In 1927, after restoration, it was reopened for worship. Some artefacts of the ancient Etruscan structure are still visible in the perimeter walls, among them a funeral urn with an Etruscan inscription. The ancient wooden truss ceiling, now deteriorated, was replaced in the 16th century with a masonry barrel vault. Inside the church is an ancient 8th-century Lombard marble ciborium with a compendium of early Christian–Ravennate figurative themes mixed with classically derived ones, like peacocks and inverted mirrors. In the presbytery is a statue of Saint Prosper in Arnulfian style, dated from the end of the 13th century.

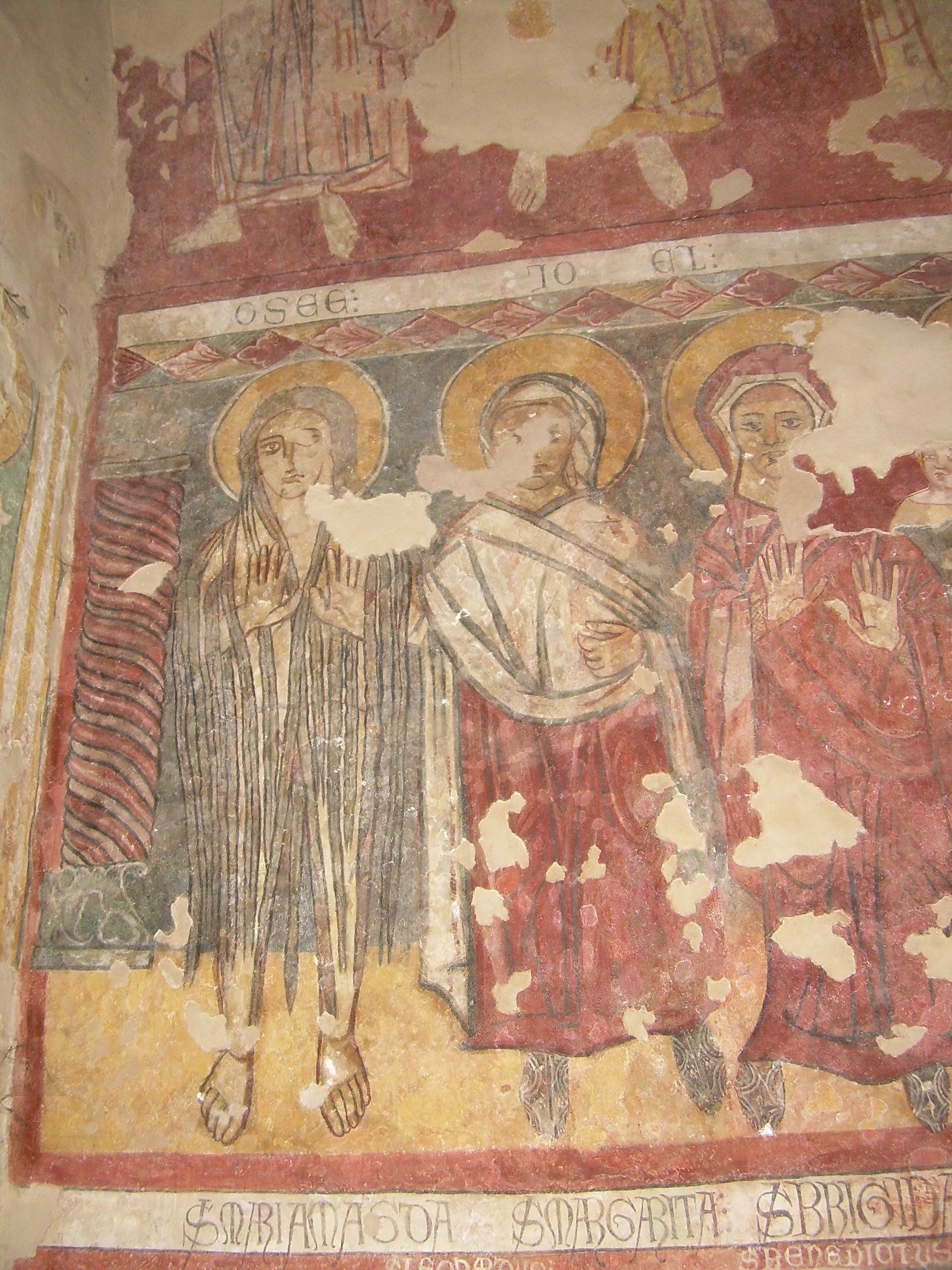
Frescoes of Bonamico P.(1225)

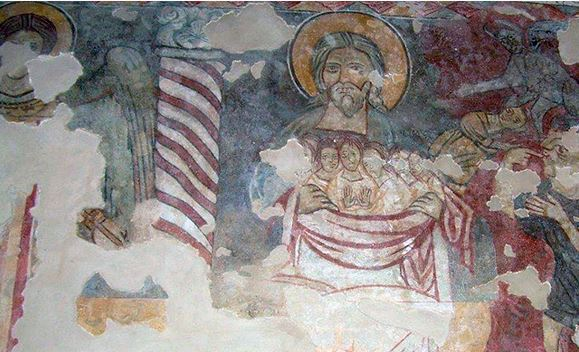
"Adam's bosom" (1225)

In the only chapel on the right are frescoes by a local artist whose signature is Bonamico P. dating from 1225 and rediscovered in 1910. Depicted are theories of the Apostles, prophets and numerous saints, especially female saints, as it was a female monastery. Among the saints appears Prosper with crosier and mitre surrounded by devotees frightened by Archangel Michael, sent to judge souls. Pietro Diletti, Salesian historian of art, reads the painting as a representation of the Last Judgment, more specifically the quotation from the Gospel according to Luke: the parable of Lazarus and the rich man. Heaven is represented by "Adam's bosom", who received the righteous in his arms. In the middle of the bosom is the poor but blessed Lazarus, prevented from communicating with hell. On the right is the depiction of hell with the rich man, Epulone, depicted as fat and thirsty pointing to his parched throat. The Angel of Darkness looms above and tries to grasp a soul. On the right side of the small chapel are Saint Herculanus, bishop and martyr, and Saint John the Baptist in the act of pointing down to i calzari di Cristo ('Christ's sandals'). Above are traces of the Annunciation. On this wall, by the main entrance are the Twelve Apostles, a group of Benedictine nuns and a devotee praying in the direction of the Franciscan martyr John of Perugia. All around is a false drapery decoration, of which only a few fragments are left.

Medieval art historians Ettore Ricci and Pietro Scalpellini find references to early Roman Christian art in the casket: the protagonists dressed in tunic and pallium, strictly placed in the front, recall the representations of ancient sarcophagi, catacomb frescoes and mosaics. Others sources for these saints can be illuminated codices originating from Asia or France; indeed the painting of Saint Mary Magdalene, only covered by her hair, refers to the iconography of Saint Mary of Egypt. It is here that, according to Scarpellini, this iconography of Mary Magdalene makes its first appearance in the West.
