= Marciana, Cascina =

Marciana
- Frazione
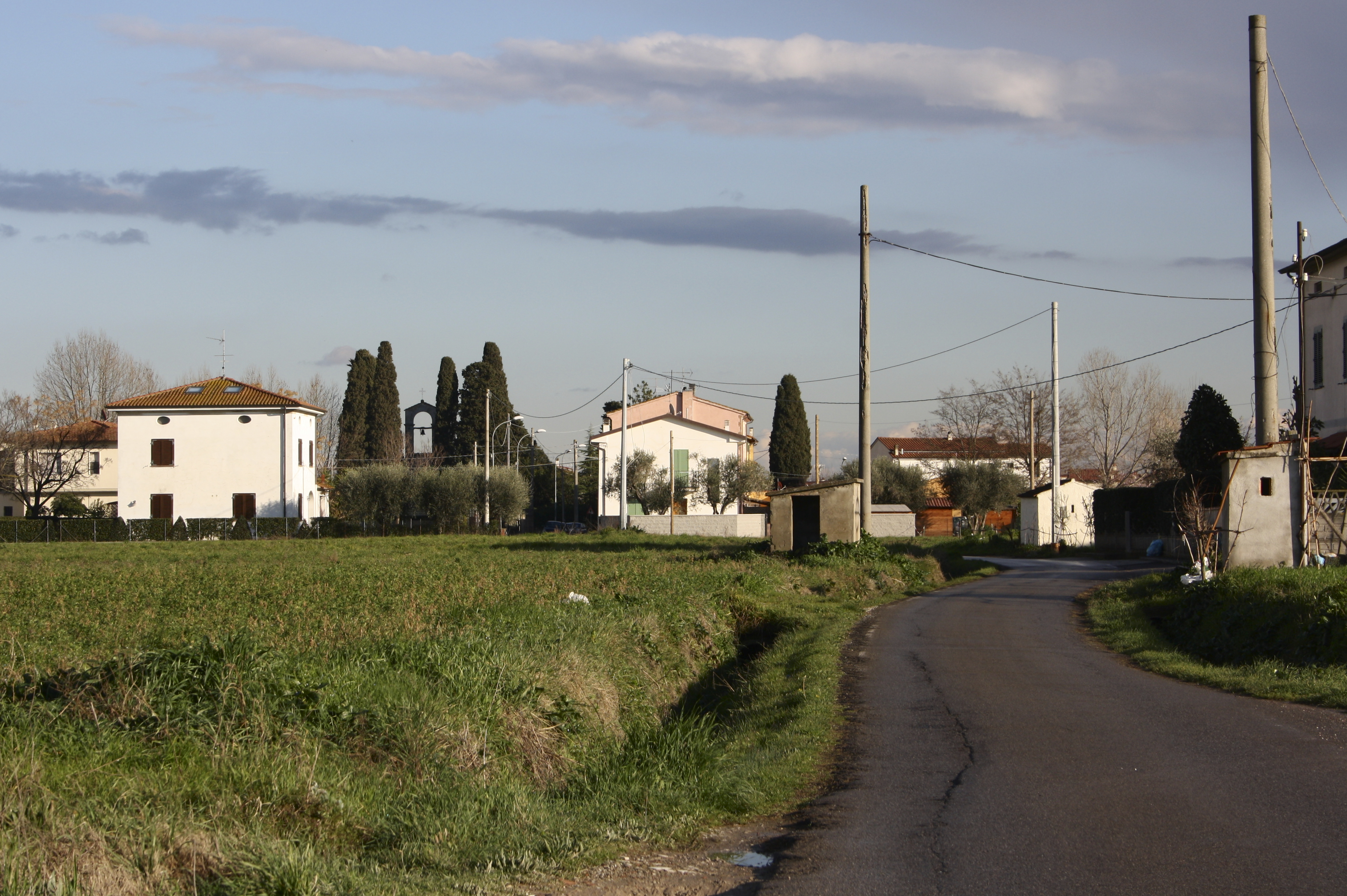

- Location of Marciana in Italy
- Coordinates: 43°40′33″N 10°31′45″E
- Country: Italy
- Region: Tuscany
- Province: Pisa (PI)
- Comune: Cascina
- Elevation: 6 m (20 ft)

Population
  - Total: 1,290
- Demonym: Marcianesi
- Time zone: UTC+1 (CET)
  - Summer (DST): UTC+2 (CEST)
- Postal code: 56023
- Dialing code: (+39) 050

Marciana is a village in Tuscany, central Italy, administratively a frazione of the comune of Cascina, province of Pisa.

Marciana is about 15 km from Pisa and 2 km from Cascina.

== Bibliography ==
- Caciagli, Giuseppe (1972). Pisa e la sua provincia. Vol. 2. Pisa: Colombo Cursi Editore.
