= Sixto =

Sixto is a Spanish name. It may refer to:

== People with the given name ==
- Sixto Brillantes (1939–2020), Filipino election lawyer
- Sixto Casanovas (1802–1852), Argentine cavalry officer, politician
- Sixto Durán Ballén (1921–2016), Ecuadorian architect, president
- Sixto Escobar (1913–1979), Puerto Rican professional boxer
- Sixto González (born 1965), Puerto Rican astronomer, director of the Arecibo Observatory
- Sixto Kaipat Igisomar, politician from the Northern Mariana Islands.
- Sixto Lezcano (born 1953), Puerto Rican born baseball outfielder
- Sixto López (1863–1947), Philippine activist, diplomat
- Sixto Palavecino (1915-2009), Argentine poet, folk musician
- Sixto Peralta (born 1979), Argentine football midfielder
- Sixto Rodriguez (1942-2023), American singer-songwriter
- Sixto Sánchez (born 1998), Dominican born baseball player
- Sixto Soria (born 1954), Cuban boxer
- Sixto Valencia Burgos (1934–2015), Mexican cartoon artist
- Sixto Vizuete (born 1961), Ecuadorian football coach

== People with the surname ==
- Adolph Sixto (1859-1930), author, lecturer, lobbyist and naturalist from Saint Thomas, U.S. Virgin Islands
- Maurice Sixto (1919–1984), Haitian author
