= Ripoli, Cascina =

Ripoli
- Frazione
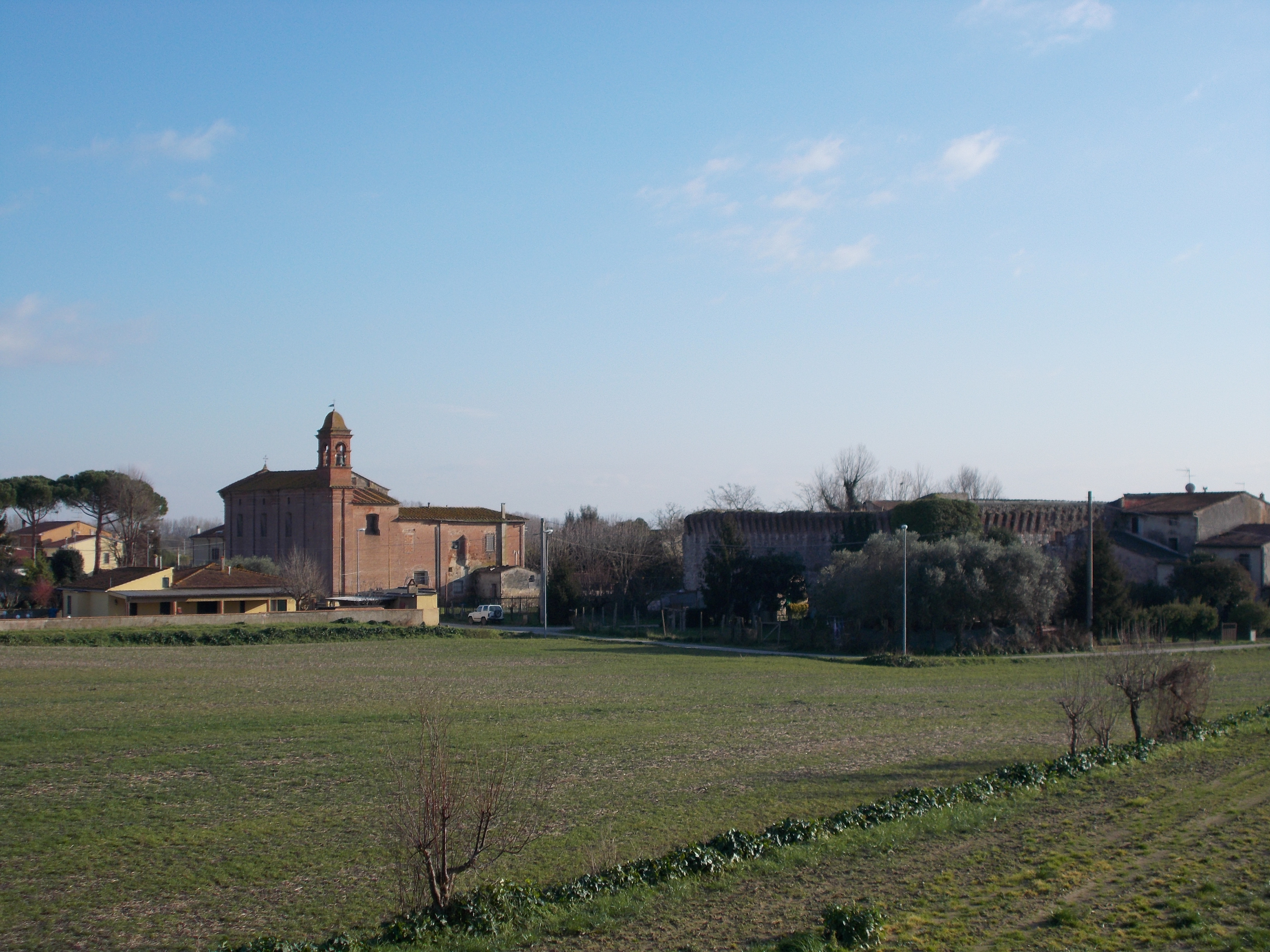

- Location of Ripoli in Italy
- Coordinates: 43°43′4″N 10°27′19″E
- Country: Italy
- Region: Tuscany
- Province: Pisa (PI)
- Comune: Cascina
- Elevation: 5 m (16 ft)

Population
  - Total: 497
- Demonym: Ripolini
- Time zone: UTC+1 (CET)
  - Summer (DST): UTC+2 (CEST)
- Postal code: 56023
- Dialing code: (+39) 050

Ripoli is a village in Tuscany, central Italy, administratively a frazione of the comune of Cascina, province of Pisa.

Ripoli is about 10 km from Pisa and 12 km from Cascina, alongside the river Arno. The village was born in the middle ages with the erection of the fortified villa by the Compagni family, in the 14th century.

== Bibliography ==
- Caciagli, Giuseppe (1972). Pisa e la sua provincia. Vol. 2. Pisa: Colombo Cursi Editore.
