= Saint-Sixte, Loire =

Saint-Sixte
- Commune
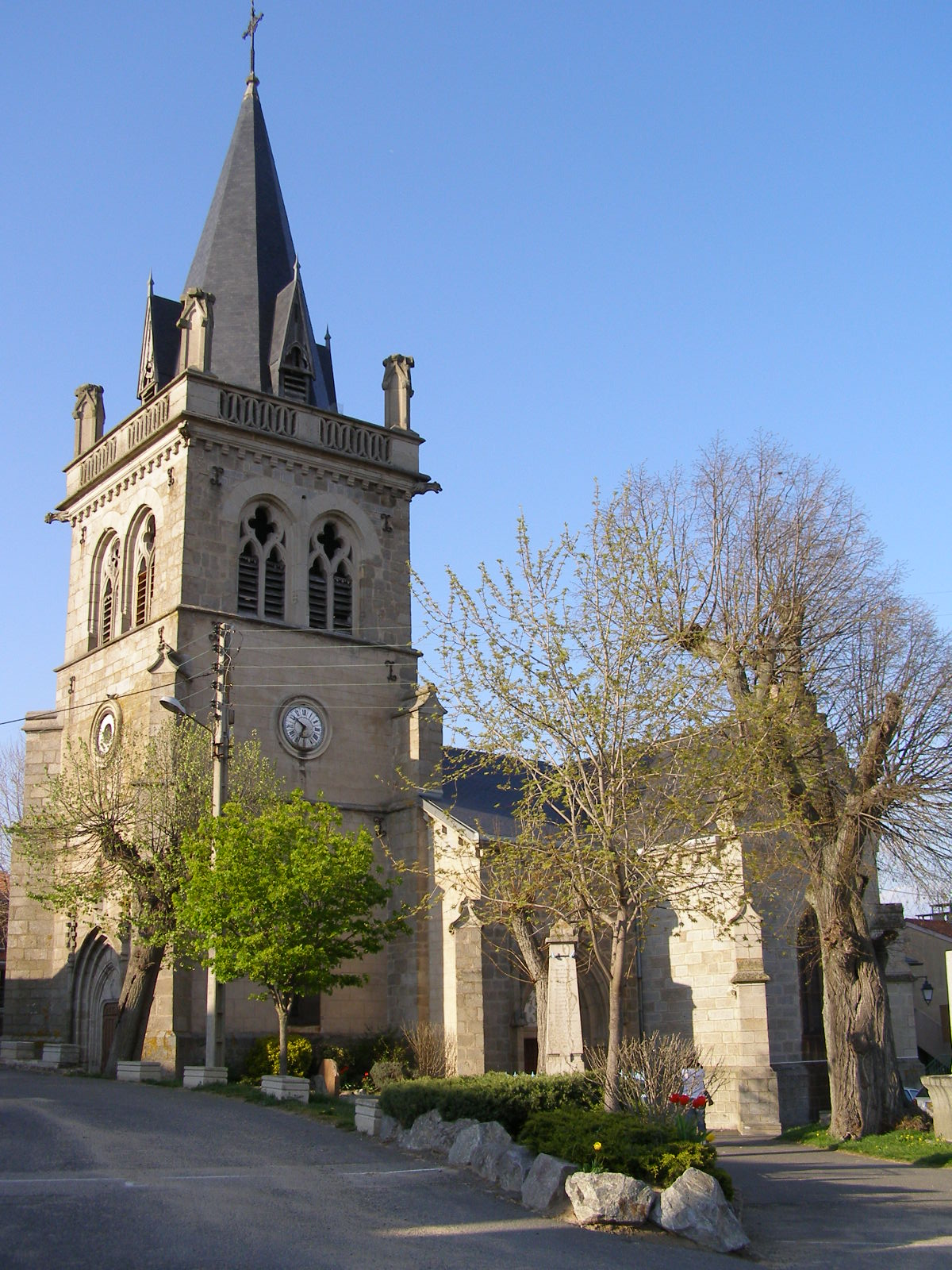

- Coat of arms
- Location of Saint-Sixte
- Location within France Location within Auvergne-Rhône-Alpes
- Coordinates: 45°46′36″N 3°58′59″E
- Country: France
- Region: Auvergne-Rhône-Alpes
- Department: Loire
- Arrondissement: Montbrison
- Canton: Boën-sur-Lignon
- Intercommunality: Loire Forez Agglomération

Government
  - Mayor (2020–2026): Jean-Maxence Demonchy
- Area^{1}: 15.35 km^{2} (5.93 sq mi)
- Elevation: 607 m (1,991 ft)
- Highest elevation: 656 m (2,152 ft)
- Lowest elevation: 390 m (1,280 ft)
- Population (2023): 669
  - Density: 43.6/km^{2} (113/sq mi)
- Time zone: UTC+01:00 (CET)
  - Summer (DST): UTC+02:00 (CEST)
- INSEE/Postal code: 42288 /42130
- ^{1} French Land Register data, which excludes lakes, ponds, glaciers > 1 km^{2} (0.386 sq mi or 247 acres) and river estuaries.

Saint-Sixte (French pronunciation: [sɛ̃ sikst]) is a commune in the Loire department in central France.

== Geography ==
The river Lignon du Forez flows through the commune.

== Population ==
Historical population
Year	Pop.	±% p.a.
1968	746	—
1975	616	−2.70%
1982	626	+0.23%
1990	607	−0.38%
1999	583	−0.45%
2007	678	+1.90%
2012	715	+1.07%
2017	710	−0.14%
2023	669	−0.99%
Source: INSEE

== See also ==
- Communes of the Loire department
