= USS Lawrence =

Five United States Navy ships have borne the name USS Lawrence in honor of James Lawrence.

- USS Lawrence (1813) was a brig which acted as Commodore Oliver Perry's flagship during the first part of the Battle of Lake Erie until she became unmanageable in that action.
- USS Lawrence (1843) was also a brig decommissioned in 1846.
- USS Lawrence (DD-8) was a 400-ton Bainbridge-class destroyer, commissioned in 1903 and serving until 1920.
- USS Lawrence (DD-250) was a Clemson-class destroyer, serving from 1921 to 1945.
- USS Lawrence (DDG-4) was a Charles F. Adams-class destroyer commissioned in 1962, and serving until 1994.

== See also ==
- USS St. Lawrence (1848), a brig in commission from 1848 to 1865.
- USS William P. Lawrence (DDG-110), an Arleigh Burke-class destroyer launched in 2009.
