= CA-123 =

CA-123 may refer to:

- San Pablo Avenue, a road in the US state of California, signed CA-123
- USS Albany (CA-123), a World War II heavy cruiser
