= Boney Point =

Boney Point (76°39′S 162°43′E) is a rock headland along the south side of the entrance to Tripp Bay in Victoria Land. It was named in association with nearby Brough Nunatak after Lieutenant Commander B.E. Boney, U.S. Navy, captain of USS Brough in Antarctic waters in Operation Deep Freeze IV, 1958–59.
