= Brough Nunatak =

Nunatak in Victoria Land, Antarctica

Brough Nunatak (76°31′S 162°27′E) is a nunatak in the northwest part of Evans Piedmont Glacier, 4 nautical miles (7 km) west-southwest of Boney Point, Victoria Land. The USS Brough (DE-148) maintained an ocean weather station at 60°S 170°E in support of aircraft flights between New Zealand and the Antarctic in Operation Deep Freeze II, III, and IV; three seasons, 1956–57 through 1958–59.
