= USS Blair =

Edsall-class destroyer escort

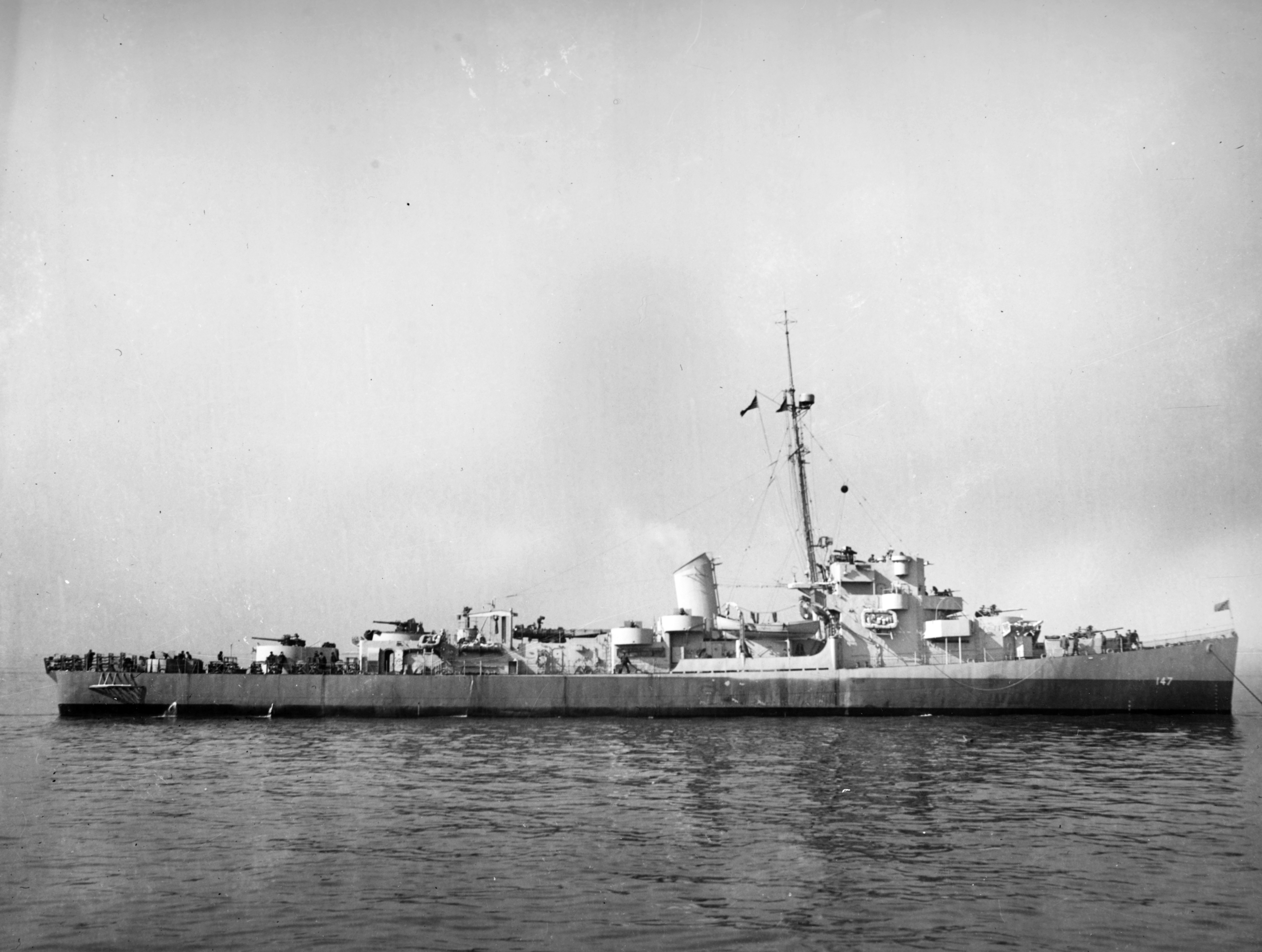

History

United States
- Namesake: Eugene Blair
- Builder: Consolidated Steel Corporation, Orange, Texas
- Laid down: 19 January 1943
- Launched: 6 April 1943
- Commissioned: 13 September 1943
- Decommissioned: 15 June 1960
- Reclassified: DER-147, 2 December 1957
- Stricken: 1 December 1972
- Fate: Sold 26 September 1974 for scrap

General characteristics
- Class & type: Edsall-class destroyer escort
- Displacement: 1,253 tons standard; 1,590 tons full load
- Length: 306 feet (93.27 m)
- Beam: 36.58 feet (11.15 m)
- Draft: 10.42 full load feet (3.18 m)
- Propulsion: 4 FM diesel engines, 4 diesel-generators, 6,000 shp (4.5 MW), 2 screws
- Speed: 21 knots (39 km/h)
- Range: 9,100 nmi. at 12 knots; (17,000 km at 22 km/h)
- Complement: 8 officers, 201 enlisted
- Armament: 3 × single 3 in (76 mm)/50 guns; 1 × twin 40 mm AA guns; 8 × single 20 mm AA guns; 1 × triple 21 in (533 mm) torpedo tubes; 8 × depth charge projectors; 1 × depth charge projector (hedgehog); 2 × depth charge tracks

USS Blair (DE-147) was an Edsall-class destroyer escort in service with the United States Navy from 1943 to 1946 and from 1951 to 1960. She was scrapped in 1974. Blair was named in honor of Chief Machinist's Mate Eugene Blair, who was awarded the Silver Star posthumously for his brave actions when his ship was attacked and bombed by Japanese planes near Port Darwin, Australia, in mid-February 1942.

== Namesake ==
Eugene Blair was born on 26 April 1908 in Tremont, Virginia. He enlisted in the United States Navy at Richmond, Virginia, on 23 November 1929. After instruction at the Naval Training Station, Hampton Roads, Virginia, Blair served on four ships during his first two-year enlistment—the destroyer tenders USS Dobbin and USS Whitney and the destroyers USS Preston and USS Leary, before being transferred to the new destroyer USS McDougal on 23 December 1936. Transferring to the transport USS Chaumont on 4 November 1939, Blair was discharged at the Naval Operating Base, Norfolk, Virginia, on 8 December 1939.

Blair reenlisted on 3 January 1940, at Boston, Massachusetts, and, following service at the New York City receiving station, joined USS William B. Preston on 14 June 1940, when that small seaplane tender was recommissioned. He remained with that warship through her transfer to the Asiatic Fleet that December and was still serving in her when war engulfed the Far East in December 1941. William B. Preston tended the PBY Catalina flying boats of Patrol Wing (PatWing) 10 in Philippine waters when the fighting began and continued this duty in the Netherlands East Indies before retiring to Port Darwin, Australia, in mid-February 1942.

Planes from four Japanese aircraft carriers struck Darwin on 19 February 1942. Early in the raid, William B. Preston got underway and headed for the open sea. As the attack had developed rapidly, Chief Machinist's Mate Blair, a member of the after repair party, went below in company with Metalsmith 2d Class LeRay Wilson, to close hatches and watertight doors. Just after they finished that task, a bomb struck the ship in the compartment in which they were standing, killing both instantly. Their efficient performance of duty, however, limited the flooding suffered by the warship to two compartments. Each man was awarded the Silver Star posthumously.

== History ==
=== Construction and commissioning ===
She was laid down on 19 January 1943 at Orange, Texas, by the Consolidated Steel Corp.; launched on 6 April 1943; sponsored by Mrs. Vestie Foster, the mother of three sons in the United States Navy; and commissioned at Orange.

=== 1943–1946 ===
==== Battle of the Atlantic ====
Blair conducted shakedown training out of Bermuda before clearing those waters on 2 November in company with USS Pennewill (DE-175). After escorting the oiler USS Kennebec (AO-36) to Bermuda, the new destroyer escort sailed to Charleston, South Carolina, where, on 7 November, the ship's SA radar was removed and DAQ HFDF (High Frequency Direction Finding, or "Huff Duff") equipment was installed. Departing Charleston on 14 November, Blair reached New York on 16 November. After shifting to New London, Connecticut, for exercises, she returned to Staten Island, New York, briefly before departing New York in a convoy bound for Hampton Roads, Virginia.

From there, the ship helped to screen Convoy UGS-25 to North Africa. Relieved of escort duties on 11 December, she put into Casablanca the same day; but tarried only briefly before heading home with GUS-24 on 18 December. She escorted the Norfolk, Virginia, and Delaware sections of GUS-24 to Chesapeake Bay on New Year's Day 1944. Blair then sailed to New York for upkeep. After refresher training at Casco Bay, Maine, the warship returned to Chesapeake Bay to join a "hunter killer" force that embarked on its mission on 24 January 1944. While crossing the Atlantic, she stopped briefly at Horta, in the Azores, to transfer her commanding officer to USS Livermore (DD-429) for medical treatment. He re-embarked as the two ships were catching up with their task group, task group TG 21.14, which they rejoined on 15 February. The group reached North African waters five days later.

For the next few months, Blair crossed and re-crossed the Atlantic, screening convoys to the United Kingdom, making a total of 10 round trip voyages between the east coast of the United States and the ports of Derry, Northern Ireland; Liverpool, England; and Cherbourg, France; also frequenting Portland, Portsmouth, and Plymouth, England. On several occasions, suspicious contacts prompted the ship to drop depth charges and make "hedgehog" attacks, but none of her targets proved to be a submarine. During her first cycle in 1945, she was detached from her convoy (UC-51B) to stand by the Army artillery transport Lakehurst (formerly APM-9) as she labored across the Atlantic, "having difficulty with improperly secured locomotives...."

==== Pacific War ====
Her last convoy, UC-70A, left the Welsh coast on 28 May and reached New York on 8 June. Proceeding down to Guantanamo Bay for refresher training soon thereafter, Blair exercised in Cuban waters until 17 July, when she sailed for the Panama Canal Zone. After arriving at Coco Solo on 20 July, she transited the Panama Canal on the 21st. She completed exercises with her antiaircraft guns on the 22d and wound up the foray by rescuing the crew of a becalmed schooner. Later that day, the destroyer escort sailed for San Diego, California, in company with USS Brough (DE-148) and USS Jacob Jones (DE-130) and arrived there on the last day of July.

==== Post WWII activity ====
Underway from the west coast on 3 August, bound for the Hawaiian Islands, Blair was at sea when atomic bombs devastated Hiroshima and Nagasaki on 6 and 9 August, hastening the end of the war. She reached Pearl Harbor on 10 August and spent the next few weeks in upkeep, tender repairs, and operational training. During this period, Japan capitulated in mid-August and formally surrendered on 2 September. Blair sailed for the California coast on 4 September with 105 Navy passengers embarked and arrived at San Pedro, California, on 10 September.

Leaving that port on the 12th with 75 Army passengers, Blair sailed for the Panama Canal Zone, bound ultimately for the east coast of the United States. She transited the Panama Canal on 20 September and reached Charleston, South Carolina, on the 25th. Through most of October 1945, the warship underwent a yard availability to prepare for deactivation. She departed Charleston on 24 October and arrived in the St. Johns River, Florida, the following day. She was decommissioned and placed in reserve at Green Cove Springs, Florida, on 28 June 1946.

=== 1951–1960 ===
Following the outbreak of hostilities in Korea in the summer of 1950, the U.S. Navy expanded to carry out its responsibilities in the Korean War, to meet its other growing Far Eastern commitments, and to face challenges in other areas of the world. Blair's reactivation began on 20 August 1951; and she was recommissioned at Mayport, Florida, on 5 October 1951. The warship spent the remainder of 1951 in local operations out of Jacksonville, Florida, Norfolk, Virginia, and Newport, Rhode Island.

Clearing Newport on 8 January 1952, Blair sailed for Guantanamo Bay, Cuba, and, after operations in Cuban waters and a visit to Kingston, Jamaica, returned to Newport in late February. Over the next four years, Blair operated out of Newport and the Fleet Sonar School at Key West, Florida, attached to Escort Squadron (CortRon) 10. She deployed to European waters late in the summer of 1952, visiting Greenock, Scotland; Bergen, Norway; and Cherbourg, France. Other ports of call which punctuated the ship's schedule in this time included Montego Bay, Jamaica; Santiago and Havana, Cuba; New Bedford, Massachusetts; Fort Lauderdale, Florida; the Philadelphia, Pennsylvania; Castine, Maine; New London, Connecticut; Port Everglades, Florida; Yorktown, Virginia; Balboa, Panama Canal Zone; and Fall River, Massachusetts. Highlighting the ship's operations out of Newport was her dramatic rescue of a family whose summer cottage had been swept into Narragansett Bay during Hurricane Carol in the summer of 1954. Five of Blair's sailors risked their lives to save the three people who clung precariously to the roof of their perilous perch.

==== Radar picket ship ====
Decommissioned again in November 1956, Blair underwent conversion at the Boston Naval Shipyard to a radar picket ship. During the alterations, she was equipped with special detection gear to allow her to join the "barrier" of ships and planes set up to warn of the approach of a nuclear attack. Recommissioned at Boston on 2 December 1957, Blair was reclassified as a radar picket destroyer escort and redesignated DER-147.

The warship then proceeded to her new home port, Pearl Harbor, where she joined CortRon 7. Blair carried out her shakedown training in the Hawaiian operating area in the spring of 1958 before commencing "barrier patrols" soon thereafter. By the end of the year, she had conducted four such deployments into the mid Pacific. Blair maintained this schedule of cruises out of Pearl Harbor into the spring of 1960.

=== Final decommissioning and fate ===
She then proceeded to the Puget Sound Naval Shipyard, where she was placed out of commission for the last time on 15 June 1960. After she had spent more than a decade in reserve, her name was struck from the Navy list on 1 December 1972, and the ship was sold for scrapping to the West Waterway Lumber Co., of Seattle, Washington, on 26 September 1974.
