= USS Albany (CA-123) =

Heavy cruiser of the United States Navy

Coordinates: 42.6542579°N 73.7481442°W

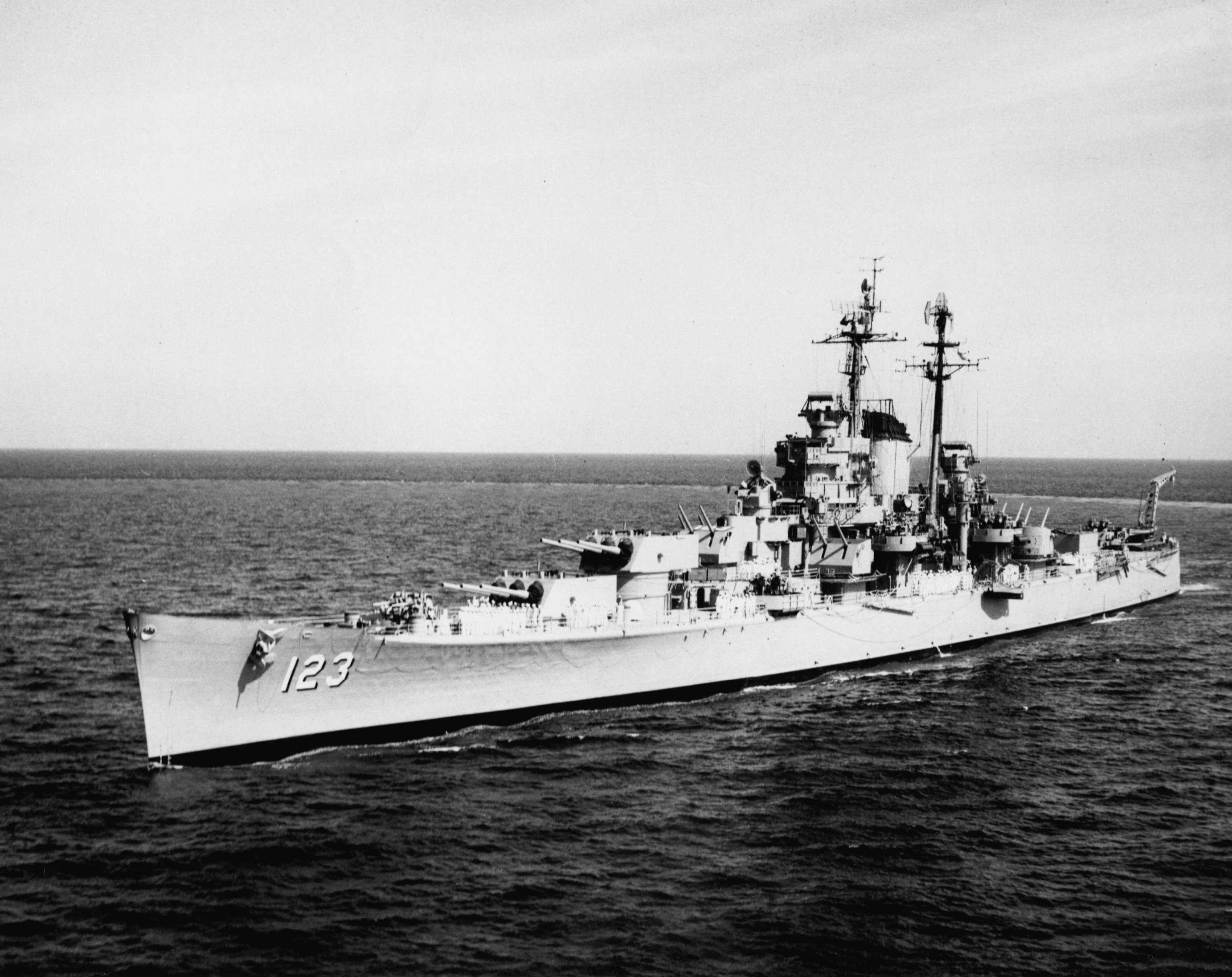
- Albany during her visit to Copenhagen in June 1951

History

United States
- Name: Albany
- Namesake: Albany, New York
- Builder: Bethlehem Steel Company, Quincy, Massachusetts
- Laid down: 6 March 1944
- Launched: 30 June 1945
- Sponsored by: Elizabeth F. Pinckney
- Commissioned: 15 June 1946
- Decommissioned: 30 June 1958
- Reclassified: CG-10, 1 November 1958
- Recommissioned: 3 November 1962
- Decommissioned: 1 March 1967
- Recommissioned: 9 November 1968
- Decommissioned: 29 August 1980
- Stricken: 30 June 1985
- Identification: Callsign: NHRF; Hull number: CA-123
- Motto: Assiduity
- Honors and awards: See Awards
- Fate: Scrapped, 12 August 1990
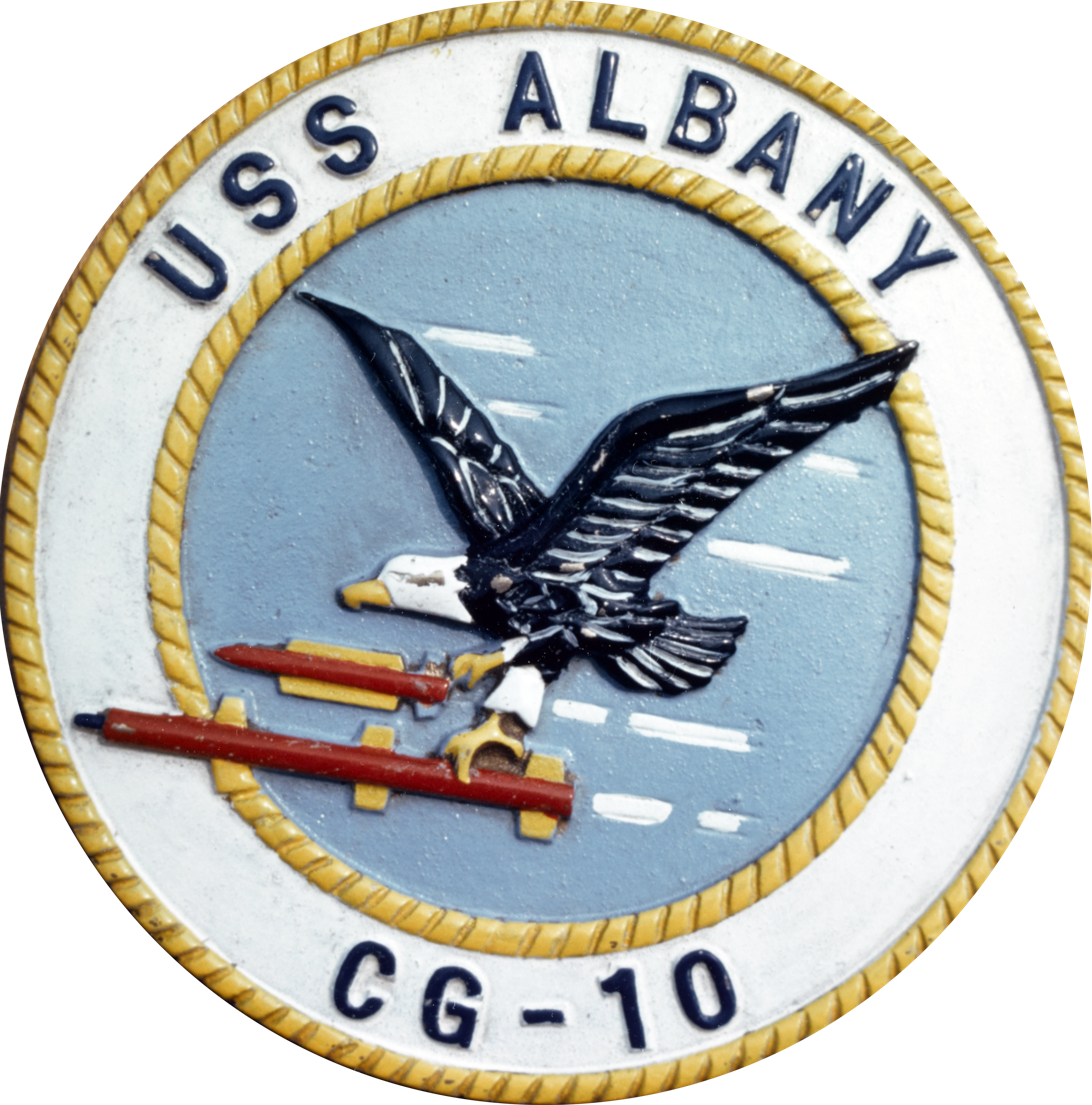
- Badge

General characteristics
- Class & type: Oregon City-class heavy cruiser
- Displacement: 13,700 tons
- Length: 673 ft 5 in (205.26 m)
- Beam: 70 ft 10 in (21.59 m)
- Draft: 26 ft 4 in (8.03 m)
- Speed: 32.6 knots (60.4 km/h; 37.5 mph)
- Complement: 1,969 officers and enlisted
- Armament: 9 × 8-inch/55-caliber guns; 12 × 5-inch/38-caliber guns; 40 × 40 mm guns; 20 × 20 mm guns

General characteristics
- Class & type: Albany-class guided-missile cruiser (1962–1980)<
- Displacement: 17,500 tons full load
- Length: 673 ft 5 in (205.26 m)
- Beam: 70 ft 10 in (21.59 m)
- Draft: 26 ft 11 in (8.20 m)
- Propulsion: Geared turbines, 120,000 shp (89,000 kW)
- Speed: 32.5 knots (60.2 km/h; 37.4 mph)
- Complement: 1,010; As flagship with staff embarked 1,205
- Armament: 2 × 5-inch/38-caliber guns; 2 × Mark 12 RIM-8 Talos missile launchers; 2 × Mark 11 RIM-24 Tartar missile launchers; 1 × Mark 16 RUR-5 ASROC launcher; 6 × torpedo tubes (two triple mounts)
- Aircraft carried: None

USS Albany (CA-123) was a United States Navy Oregon City-class heavy cruiser, later converted to the guided missile cruiser CG-10. The converted cruiser was the lead ship of the new Albany guided missile cruiser class. She was the fourth ship to carry the name Albany.

The ship was laid down on 6 March 1944 at Quincy, Massachusetts, by the Bethlehem Steel Company, launched on 30 June 1945, sponsored by Mrs. Elizabeth F. Pinckney, and commissioned on 15 June 1946 at the Boston Navy Yard.

== Service history ==
Following outfitting and a shakedown cruise in the vicinity of Casco Bay, Maine, Albany began operations along the east coast of the United States punctuated with cruises to the West Indies. During the ensuing months, the cruiser made a number of voyages for the purpose of training naval reservists and NROTC midshipmen. Albany continued to perform such duty until 11 September 1948, when she stood out of Chesapeake Bay for her first tour of duty with the American naval forces operating in the Mediterranean Sea, recently made a permanent establishment as the 6th Fleet. That deployment set the tone for the next decade. The cruiser alternated five assignments to the 6th Fleet with operations along the east coast of the United States and in the West Indies and made three cruises to South American ports. During one of the South American voyages, Albany carried the official United States representative to the inauguration of the President of Brazil in January 1951.

For two years, stretching at least until the autumn of 1955, Albany served as flagship for Commander, Battleship-Cruiser Force, Atlantic.

=== Conversion to guided missile cruiser ===
On 30 June 1958, Albany was placed out of commission at the Boston Naval Shipyard to begin conversion to a guided missile cruiser. On 1 November 1958, she was redesignated CG-10. The warship spent the next four years at Boston undergoing very extensive modifications as part of the conversion; stripped down to her hull to be fitted with a new superstructure. Albany was recommissioned at Boston on 3 November 1962. For almost five years, she alternated deployments to European waters – both to the Mediterranean Sea and to the North Atlantic – with operations along the east coast and in the West Indies. During that time, the cruiser visited many foreign ports and participated in a number of exercises with units of friendly navies. On 1 March 1967, she was decommissioned at the Boston Naval Shipyard once again to undergo extensive modifications. Some 20 months later, on 9 November 1968, Albany was placed back in commission at Boston. In 1973, the ship was again decommissioned for overhaul at the Philadelphia Naval Shipyard. It was recommissioned in May 1974 and homeported in Norfolk, VA. Shortly thereafter, it became the flagship of the 2nd Fleet.

Between 1976 and 1980, Albany was the flagship of the 6th Fleet, and homeported in Gaeta, Italy.

== Decommissioning and disposal ==
Albany was decommissioned on 29 August 1980 and laid up on the Elizabeth River across from the Norfolk Navy Yard. She was stricken from the Naval Vessel Register on 30 June 1985, but she remained at her berth and held for possible donation as a museum ship in her name sake city for a further five years. Though there was serious interest in saving the ship, a feasible museum and financial plan was never realized, and she was sold for scrapping on 12 August 1990.

== Commemoration ==
A portion of Albany's bow resides at the Albany County Fairgrounds in Altamont, New York.

The original 14-foot-long (1:48 scale) brass model of the ship built by the United States Navy to help determine where antenna arrays would go on the actual-size ships was restored in 2013 and is on display at the Albany Heritage Area Visitors Center. Albany's bridge equipments like the ship wheel, clock, window, telephone, dining silver sets, items from crew members, shipbuilder plaque, bell, and more are all on display at USS Albany Heritage Exhibit.

== Awards ==
- Navy Unit Commendation with 2 awards
- Navy "E" Ribbon with 3 awards
- World War II Victory Ribbon
- World War II Occupation Medal with "Europe" clasp
- National Defense Service Medal with 2 awards

Battenburg Cup

== Gallery ==
USS Albany lifecycle

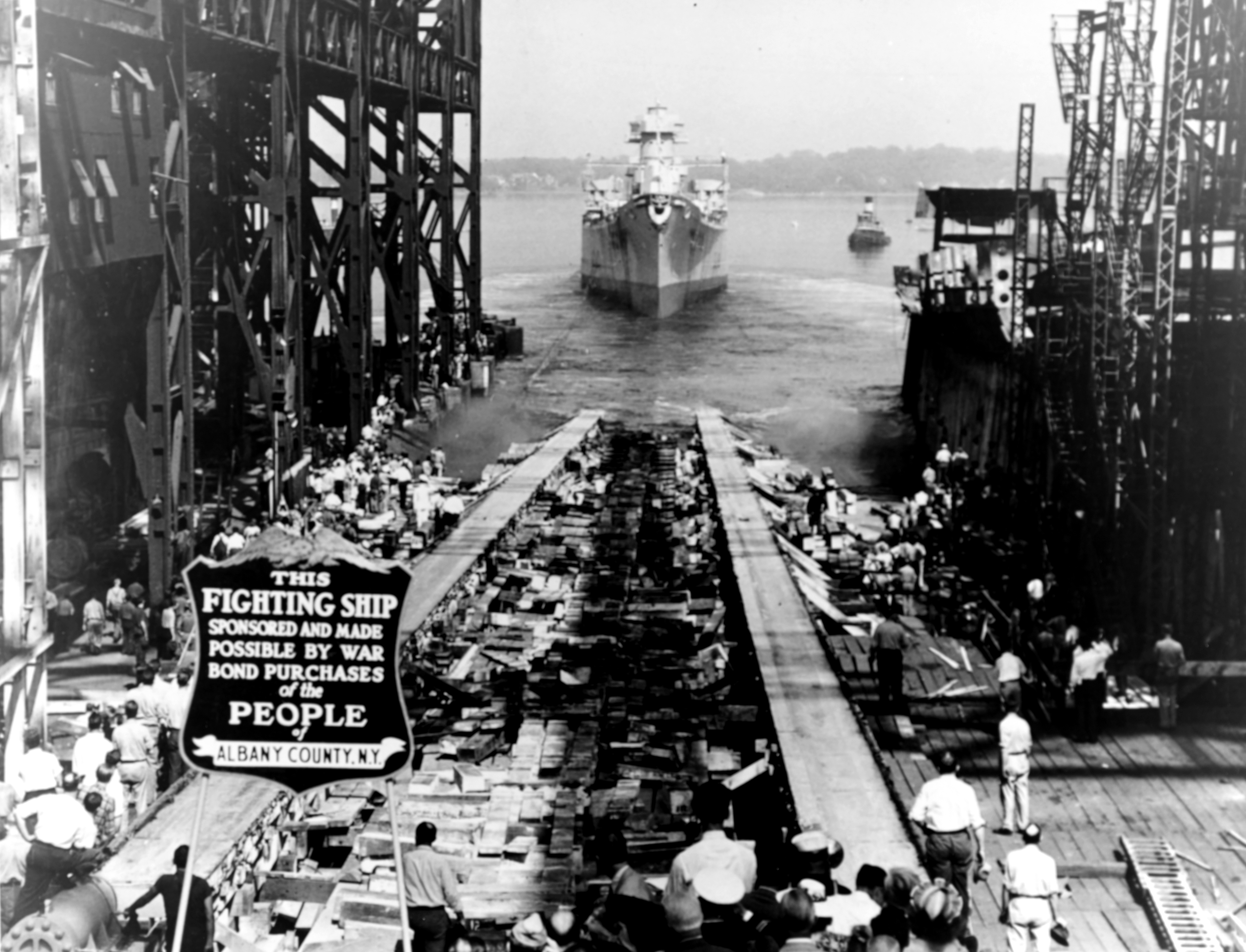
Albany at Fore River Shipyard on 30 June 1945.

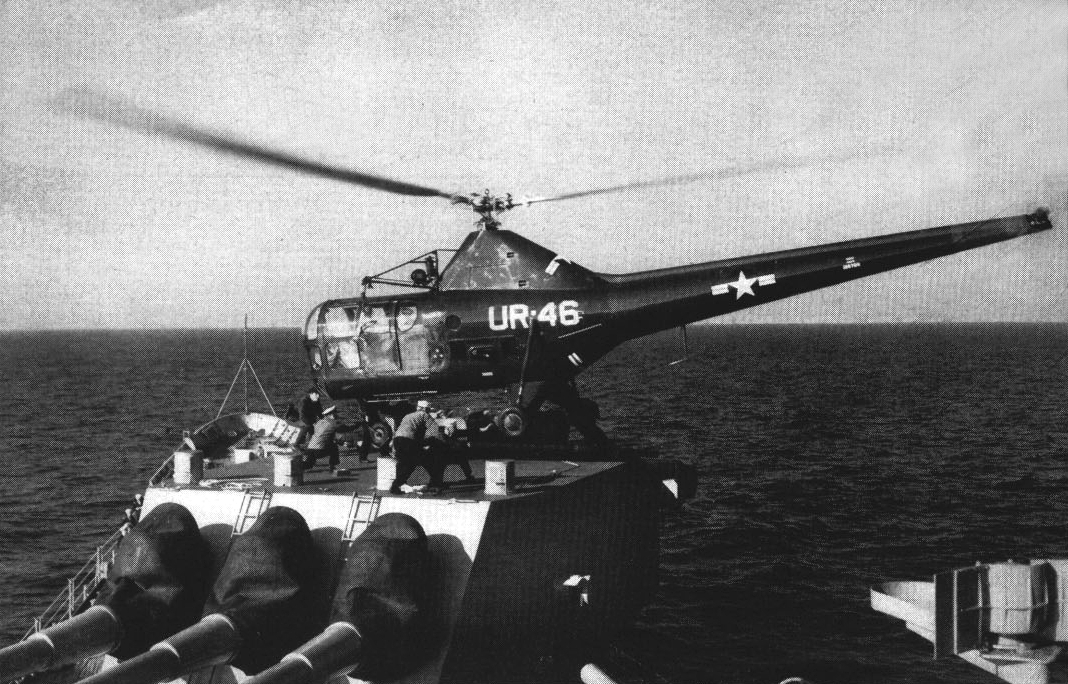
HO3S landing on turret of Albany in c1951.

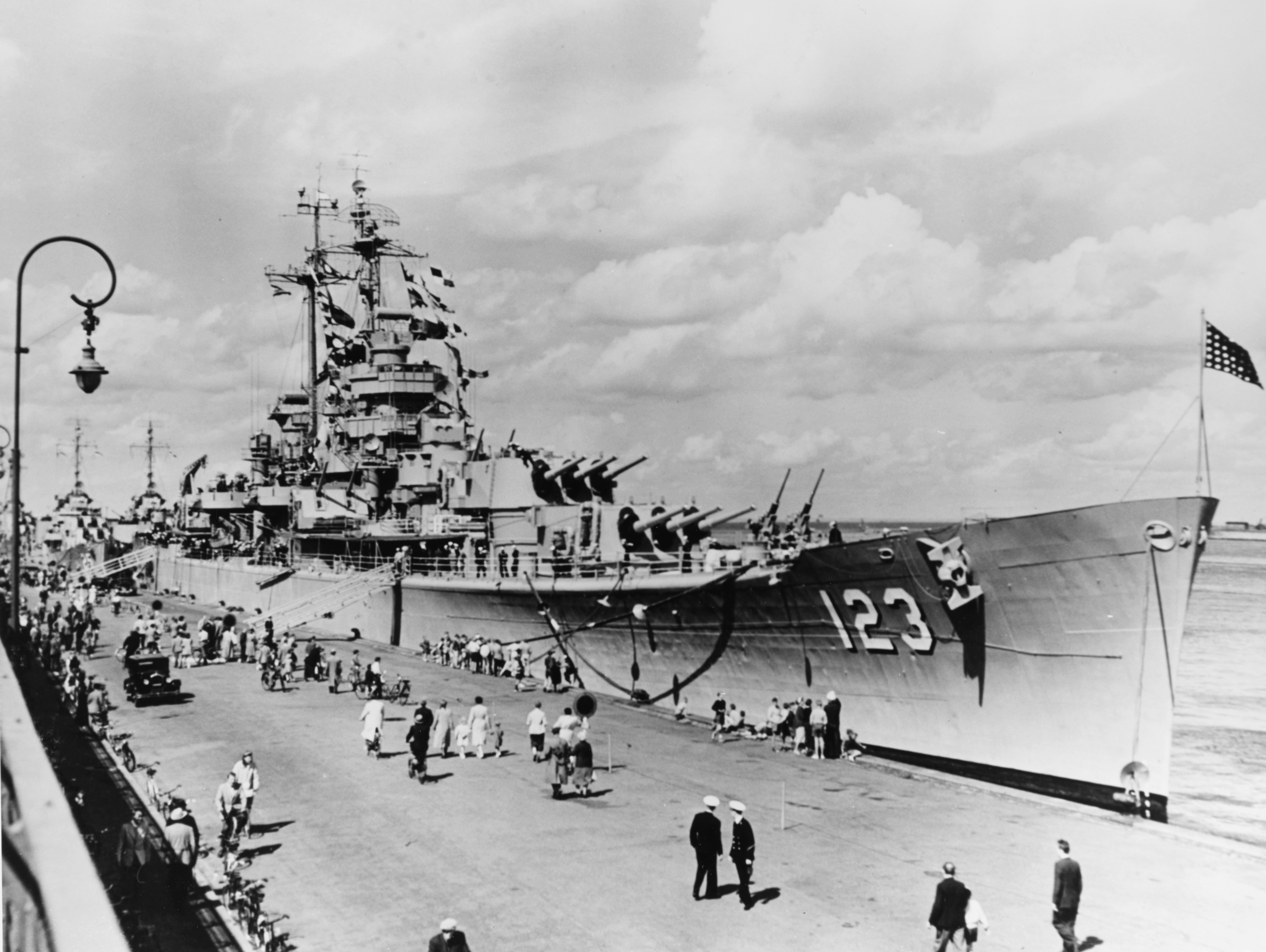
Albany at Copenhagen in June 1951.

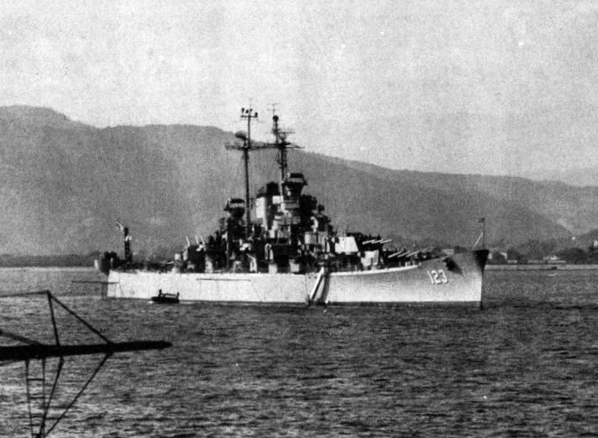
Albany anchored off Cannes in 1954.

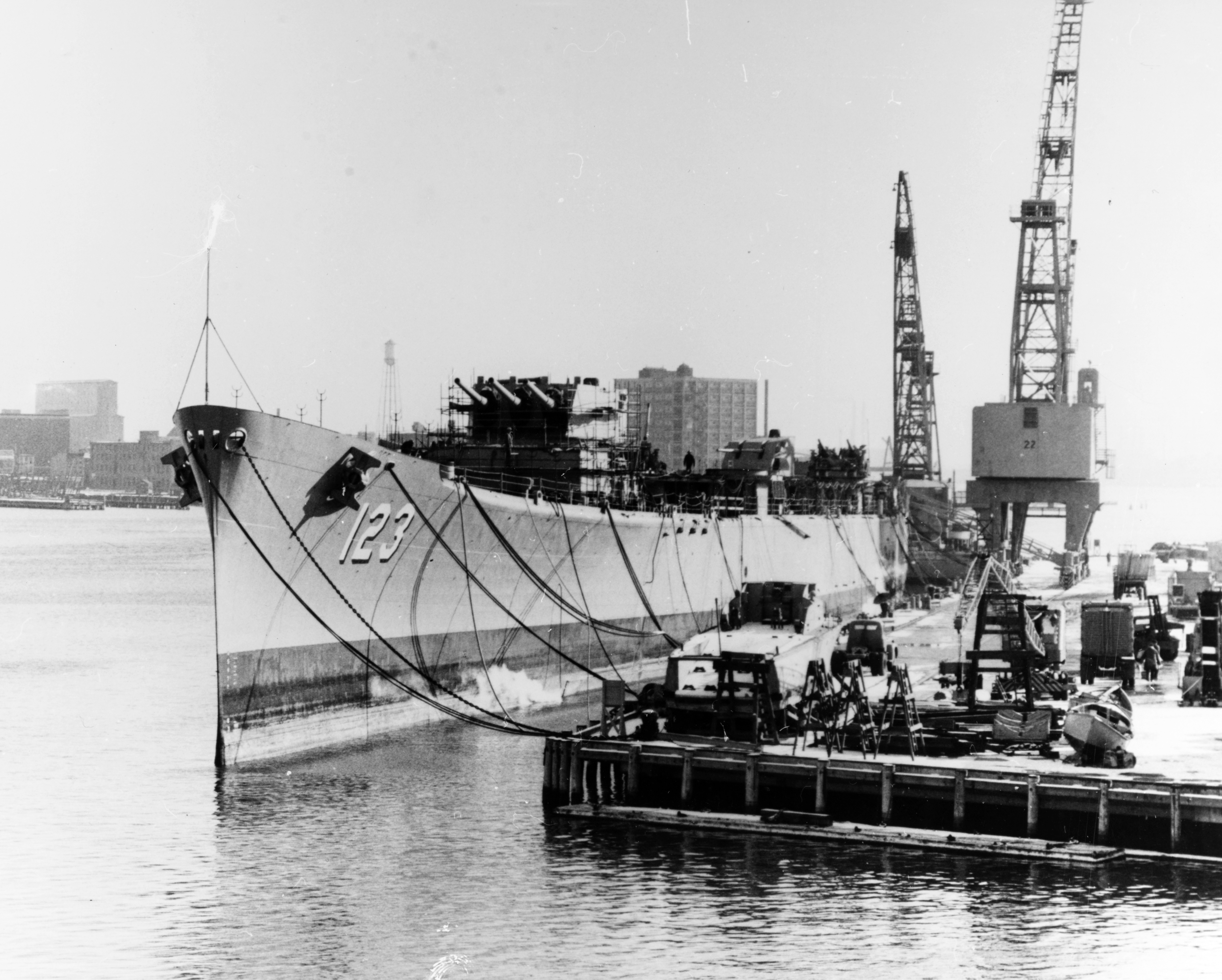
Albany at Boston Naval Shipyard in 1959.

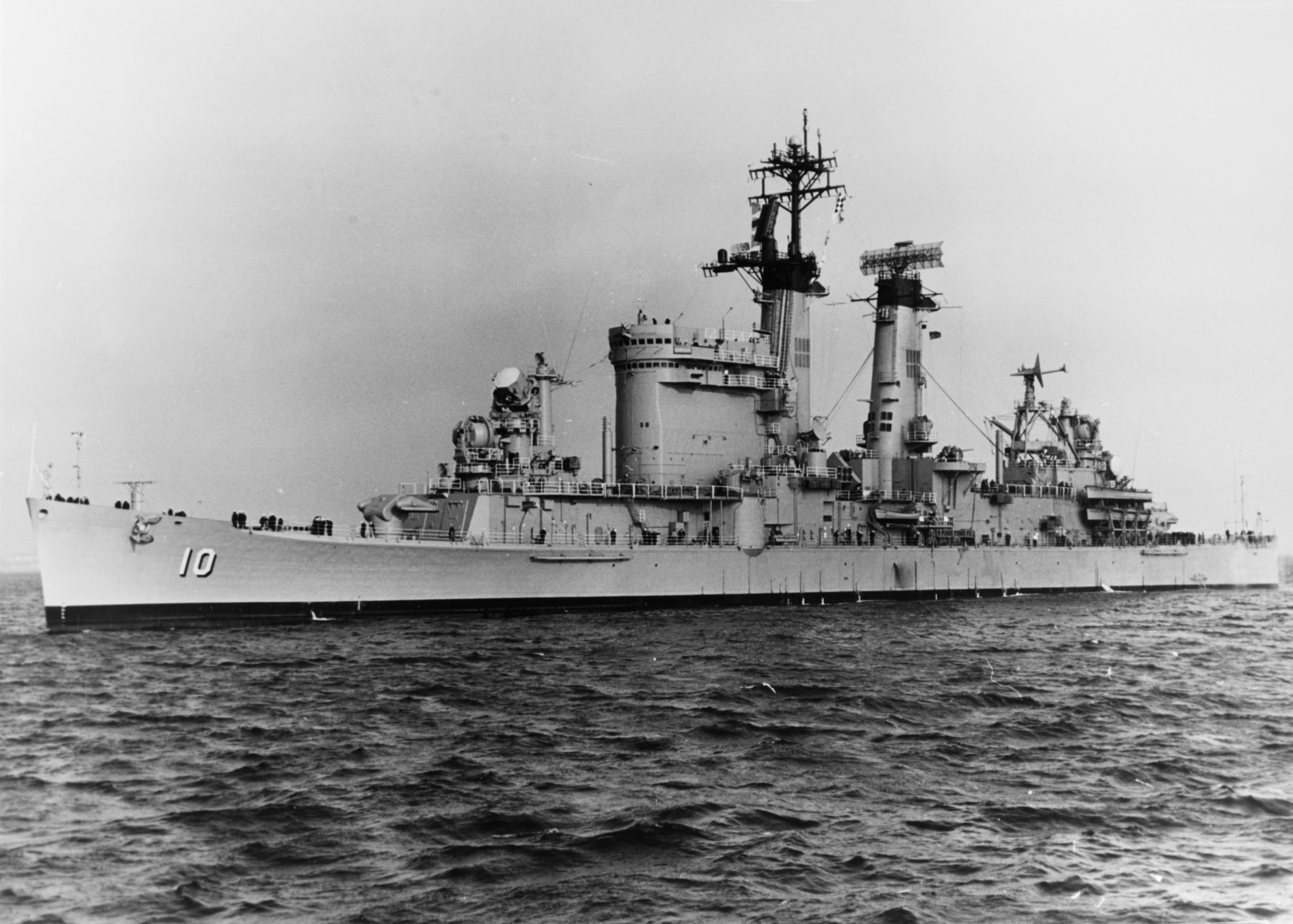
Albany in Boston Harbor on 26 November 1968.

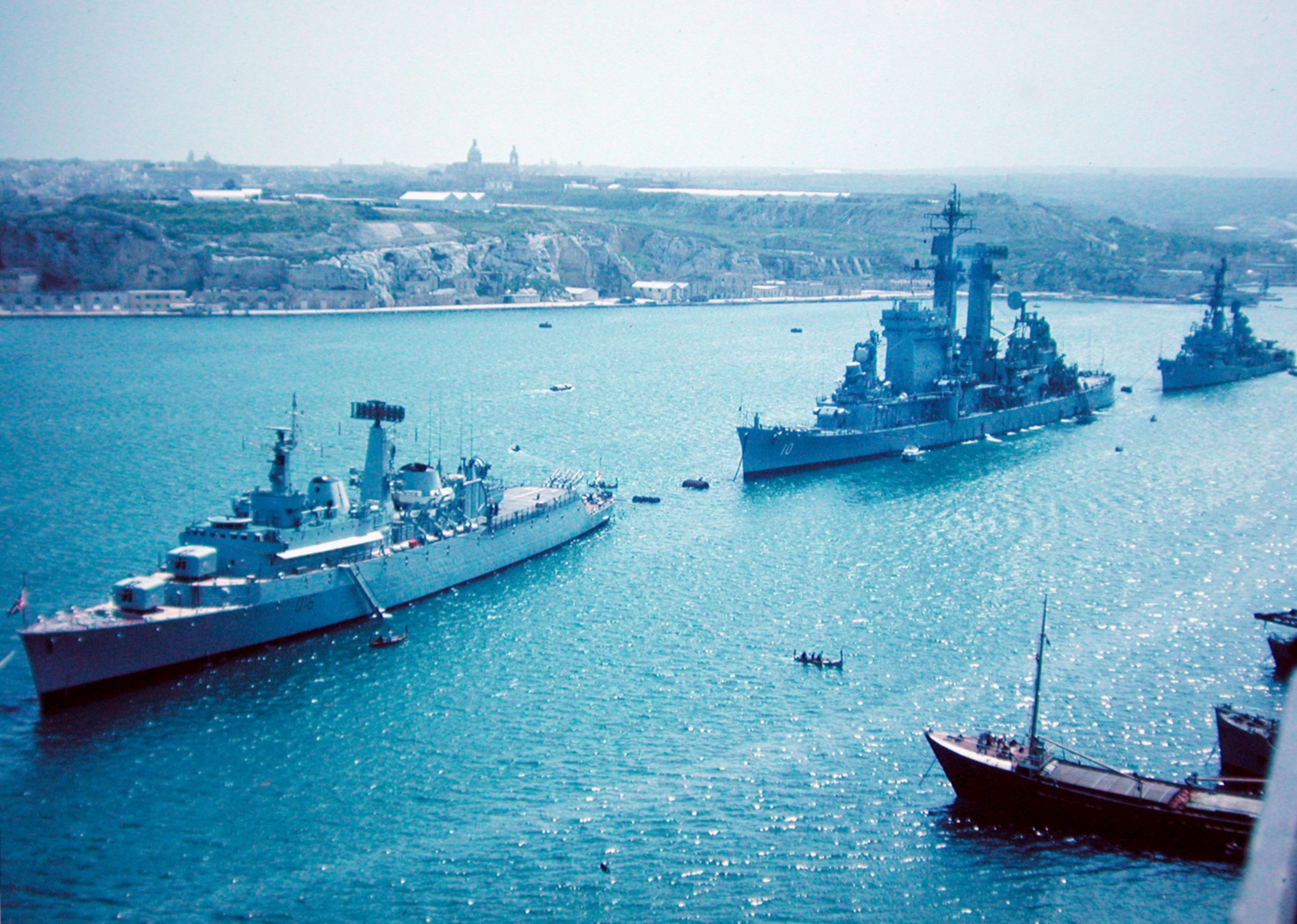
HMS London, USS Albany and USS Lawrence anchored at Malta in 1971.

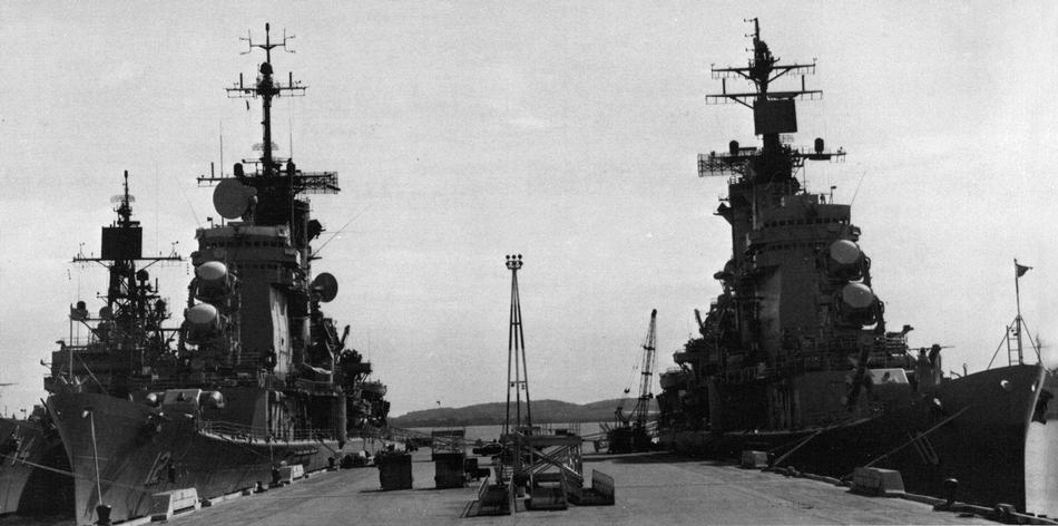
USS Albany and USS Columbus at Naval Station Roosevelt Roads, Puerto Rico in 1972.

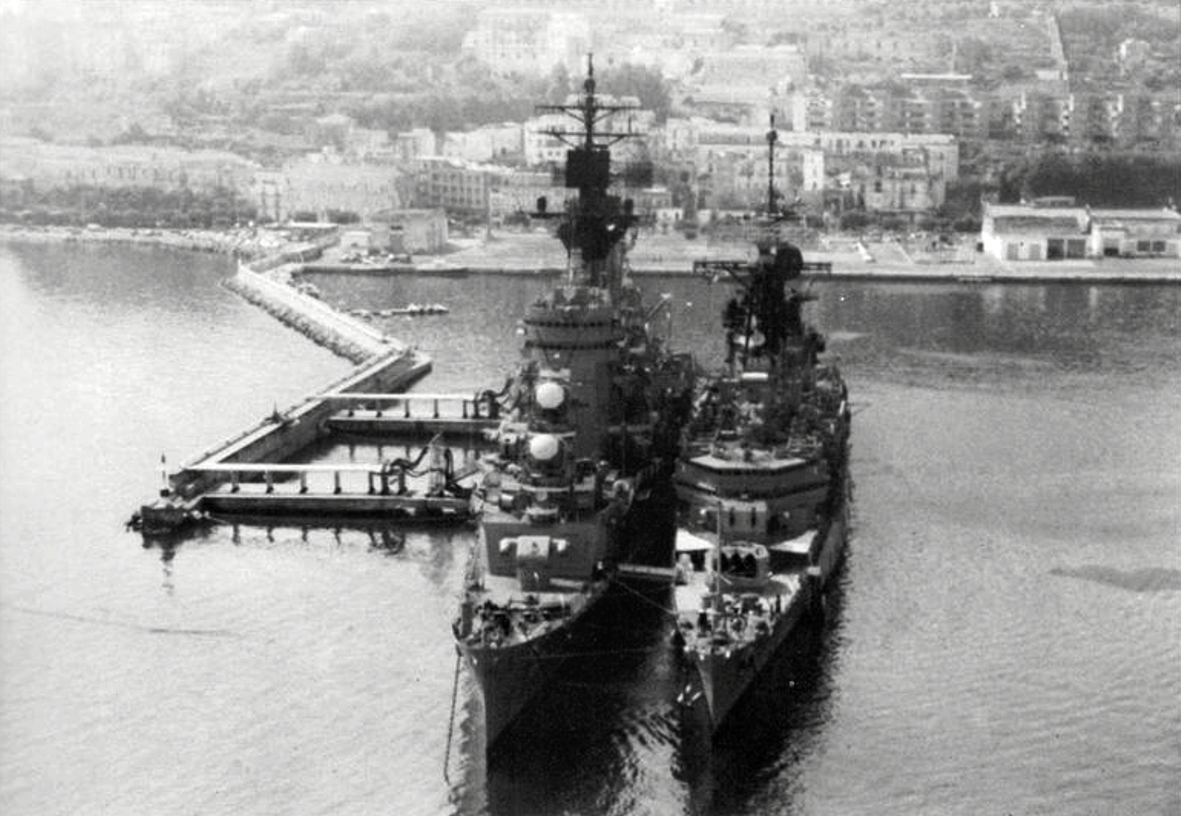
USS Little Rock and USS Albany docked at the refueling pier at Gaeta, Italy in 1976.

== Bibliography ==
- Wright, Christopher C. (1977). "The Tall Ladies...Columbus, Albany & Chicago". Warship International. XIV (2): 104–134. ISSN 0043-0374.
