= James Lawrence =

American naval officer (1781–1813)

Captain James Lawrence
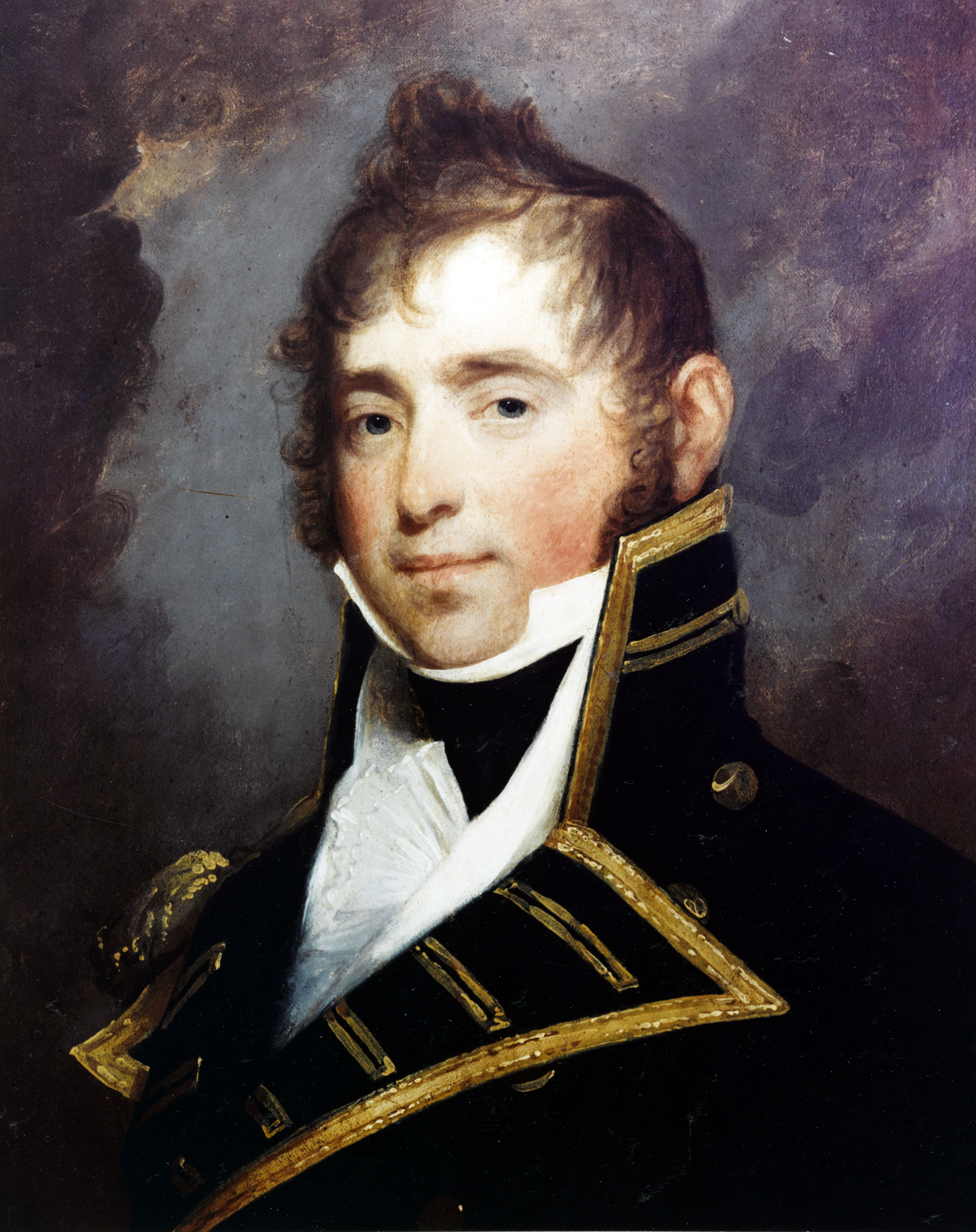
- Portrait by Gilbert Stuart, c. 1812
- Born: October 1, 1781; Burlington, New Jersey, US
- Died: June 4, 1813 (aged 31); USS Chesapeake near Boston, Massachusetts, US
- Cause of death: Gunshot Wound
- Resting place: Trinity Church Cemetery, New York, New York
- Military career
- Spouse: Julia Montaudevert
- Children: 1
- Allegiance: United States
- Branch: United States Navy
- Service years: 1798–1813
- Rank: Captain
- Commands: USS Vixen; USS Wasp; USS Argus; USS Hornet; USS Chesapeake
- Conflicts: Quasi-War; First Barbary War; Action of 2 June 1803; War of 1812; Sinking of HMS Peacock; Capture of USS Chesapeake (DOW)

James Lawrence (October 1, 1781 – June 4, 1813) was an officer of the United States Navy. During the War of 1812, he commanded USS Chesapeake in a single-ship action against HMS Shannon, commanded by Philip Broke. He is probably best known today for his last words, "Don't give up the ship!", uttered during the capture of the Chesapeake. The quotation is still a popular naval battle cry, and was invoked in Oliver Hazard Perry's personal battle flag, adopted to commemorate his dead friend.

== Biography ==
Lawrence was born on October 1, 1781, the son of John and Martha (Tallman) Lawrence, in Burlington, New Jersey, but raised in Woodbury. His mother died when he was an infant, and his Loyalist father fled to Canada during the American Revolution, leaving his half-sister to care for the young Lawrence. He attended Woodbury Academy. Though Lawrence studied law, he entered the United States Navy as a midshipman in 1798. Lawrence hailed from a New England family of English descent, as his first ancestor to the American Colonies was William Lawrence, sailing from Hertfordshire, England.

During the Quasi-War with France, he served on USS Ganges and the frigate USS Adams in the Caribbean. He was commissioned a lieutenant on April 6, 1802, and served aboard USS Enterprise in the Mediterranean, taking part in a successful attack on enemy craft on June 2, 1803.

In February 1804, he was second in command during the expedition to destroy the captured frigate USS Philadelphia. Later in the conflict he commanded Enterprise and a gunboat in battles with the Tripolitans. He was also First Lieutenant of the frigate Adams and, in 1805, commanded the small Gunboat No. 6 during a voyage across the Atlantic to North Africa.

Although Gunboats No. 2 through 10 (minus No. 7) arrived in the Mediterranean too late to see action, they remained there with Commodore Rodgers's squadron until summer 1806, at which time they sailed back to the United States. On June 12, 1805, Gunboat No. 6 encountered a Royal Navy vessel that impressed three seamen.

Subsequently, Lieutenant Lawrence commanded the warships USS Vixen, USS Wasp and USS Argus. In 1810, he also took part in trials of an experimental spar torpedo. Promoted to the rank of Master Commandant in November 1810, he took command of the sloop of war USS Hornet a year later and sailed her to Europe on a diplomatic mission. From the beginning of the War of 1812, Lawrence and Hornet cruised actively, capturing the privateer Dolphin in July 1812. Later in the year Hornet blockaded the British sloop HMS Bonne Citoyenne at Bahia, Brazil, and on February 24, 1813 captured HMS Peacock.

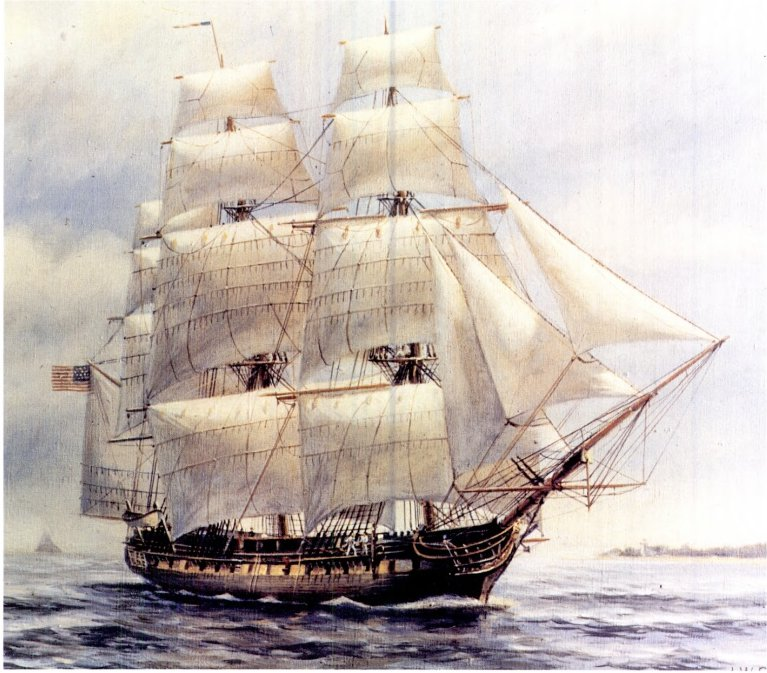
USS Chesapeake by F. Muller. US Navy Art Collection

Battle flag used by Oliver Hazard Perry

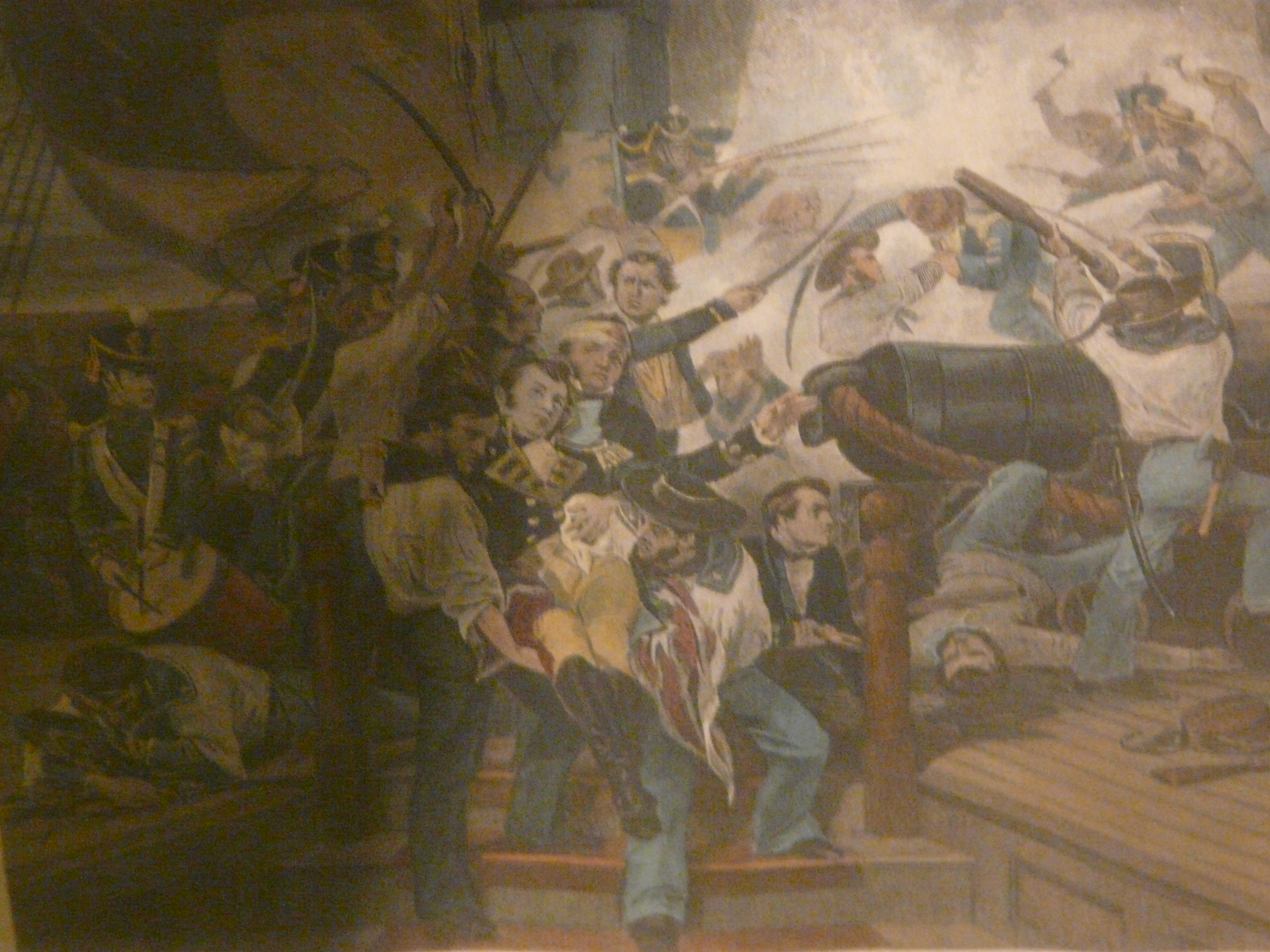
Artist representation of the "Don't Give Up the Ship" moment

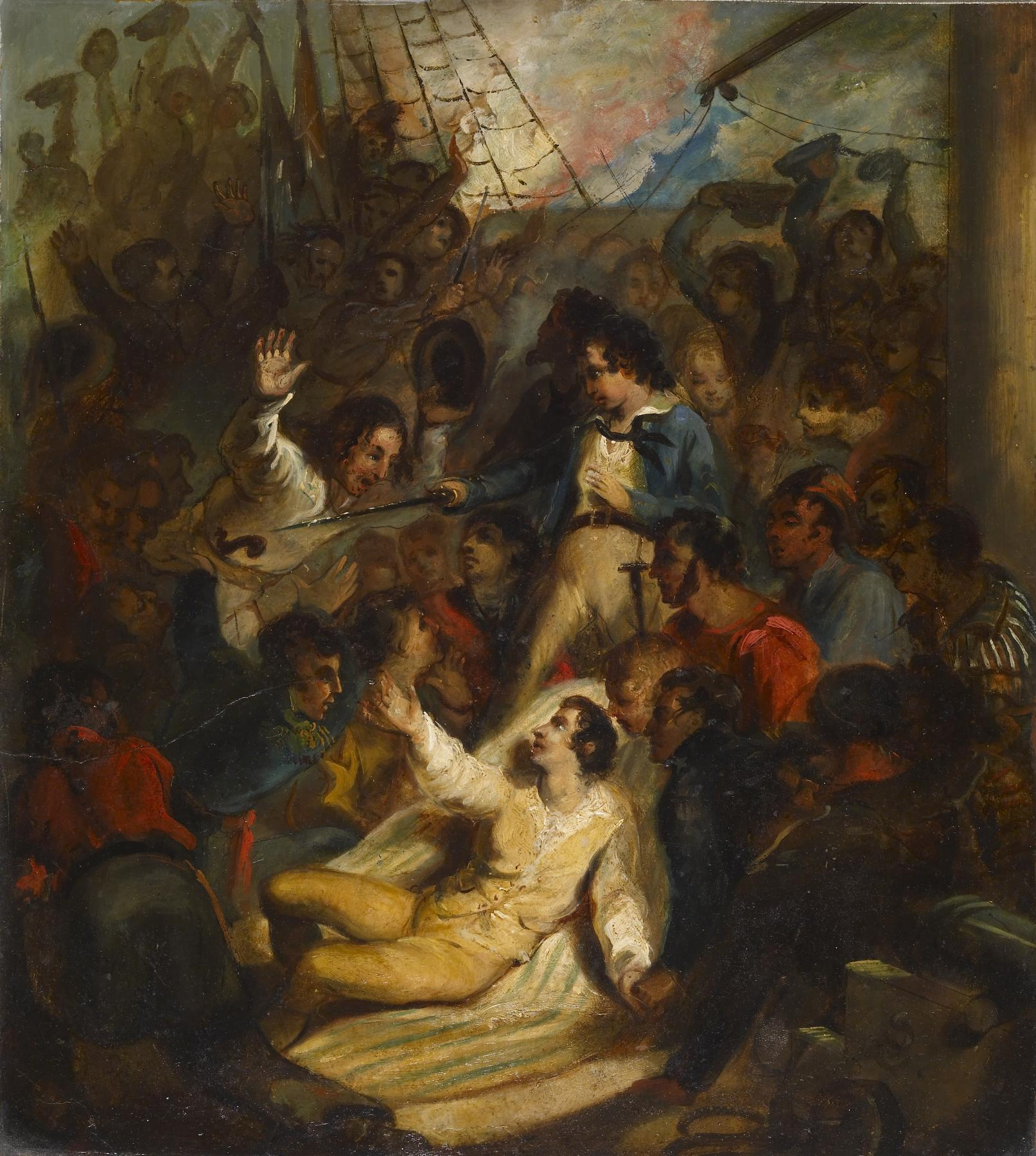
"Don't Give Up That Ship!", a depiction of Lawrence's death by Alfred Jacob Miller

Upon his return to the United States in March, Lawrence learned of his promotion to captain. Two months later he took command of the frigate Chesapeake, then preparing for sea at Boston. He left port on June 1, 1813, and immediately engaged the blockading Royal Navy frigate Shannon in a fierce battle. Although slightly smaller, the British ship disabled Chesapeake with gunfire within the first few minutes. Captain Lawrence, mortally wounded by small arms fire, ordered his officers, "Don't give up the ship. Fight her till she sinks." or "Tell the men to fire faster! Don't give up the ship." Men carried him below, and his crew was overwhelmed by a British boarding party shortly afterward. James Lawrence died of his wounds on June 4, 1813, while his captors directed Chesapeake to Halifax, Nova Scotia.

After Lawrence's death was reported to his friend and fellow officer Oliver Hazard Perry, he ordered a large blue battle ensign, stitched with the phrase "DONT GIVE UP THE SHIP" [sic] in bold white letters. The Perry Flag was displayed on his flagship during a victorious engagement against the British on Lake Erie in September 1813. The original flag is displayed in the Naval Academy Museum and a replica is displayed in Memorial Hall at the United States Naval Academy in Annapolis, Maryland. A replica is also on view at Perry's Victory and International Peace Memorial, on South Bass Island, Ohio.

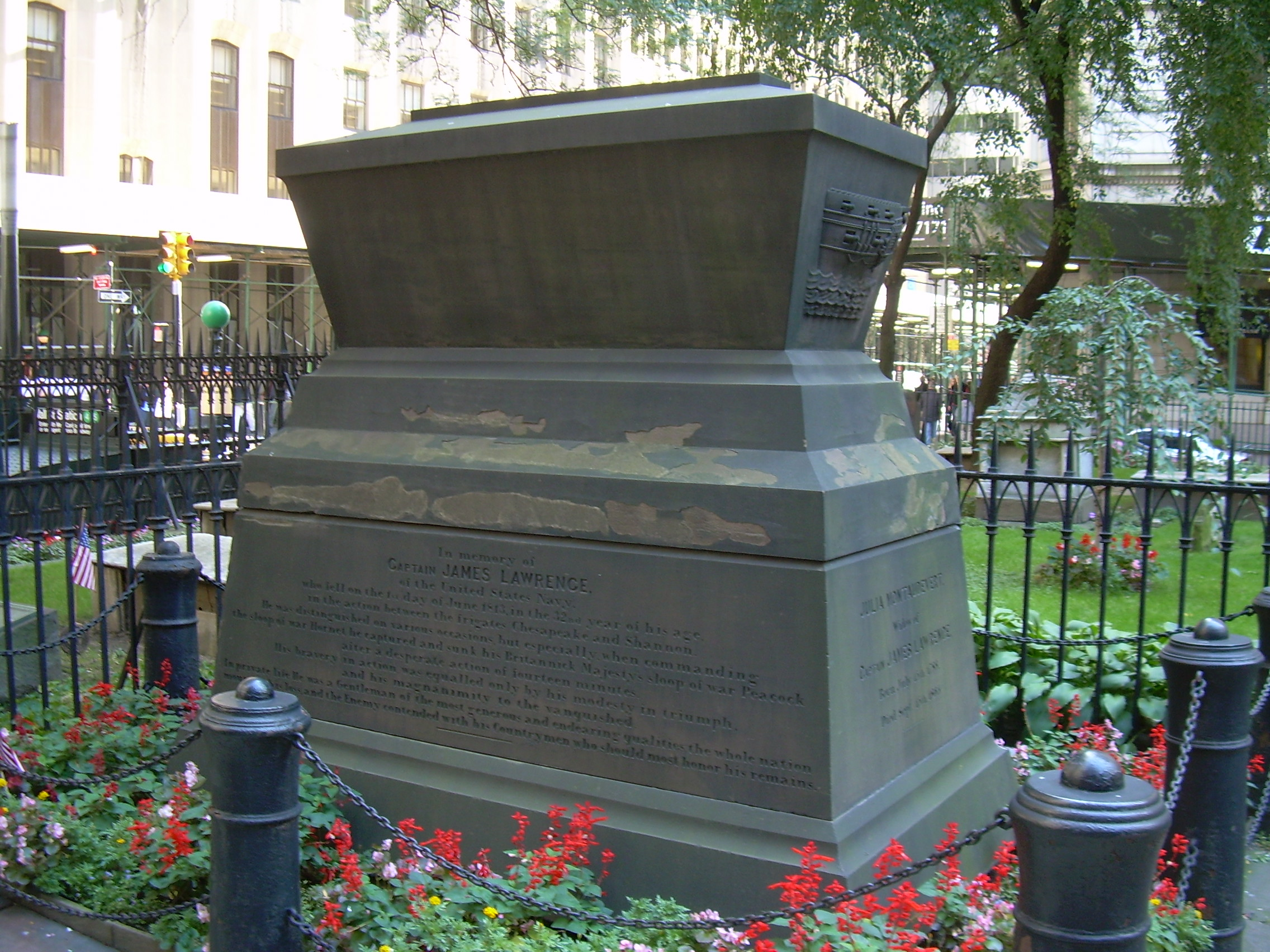
James Lawrence's grave at Trinity Church Cemetery

Lawrence was buried with military honors at present-day CFB Halifax, Nova Scotia, but reinterred at Trinity Church Cemetery in New York City. He was survived by his wife, Julia (Montaudevert) Lawrence, who lived until 1865, and their two-year-old daughter, Mary Neill Lawrence. In 1838 Mary married a Navy officer, Lt. William Preston Griffin.

On July 4, 1813, Lawrence was posthumously elected to membership in the New York Society of the Cincinnati.

== Namesakes and honors ==
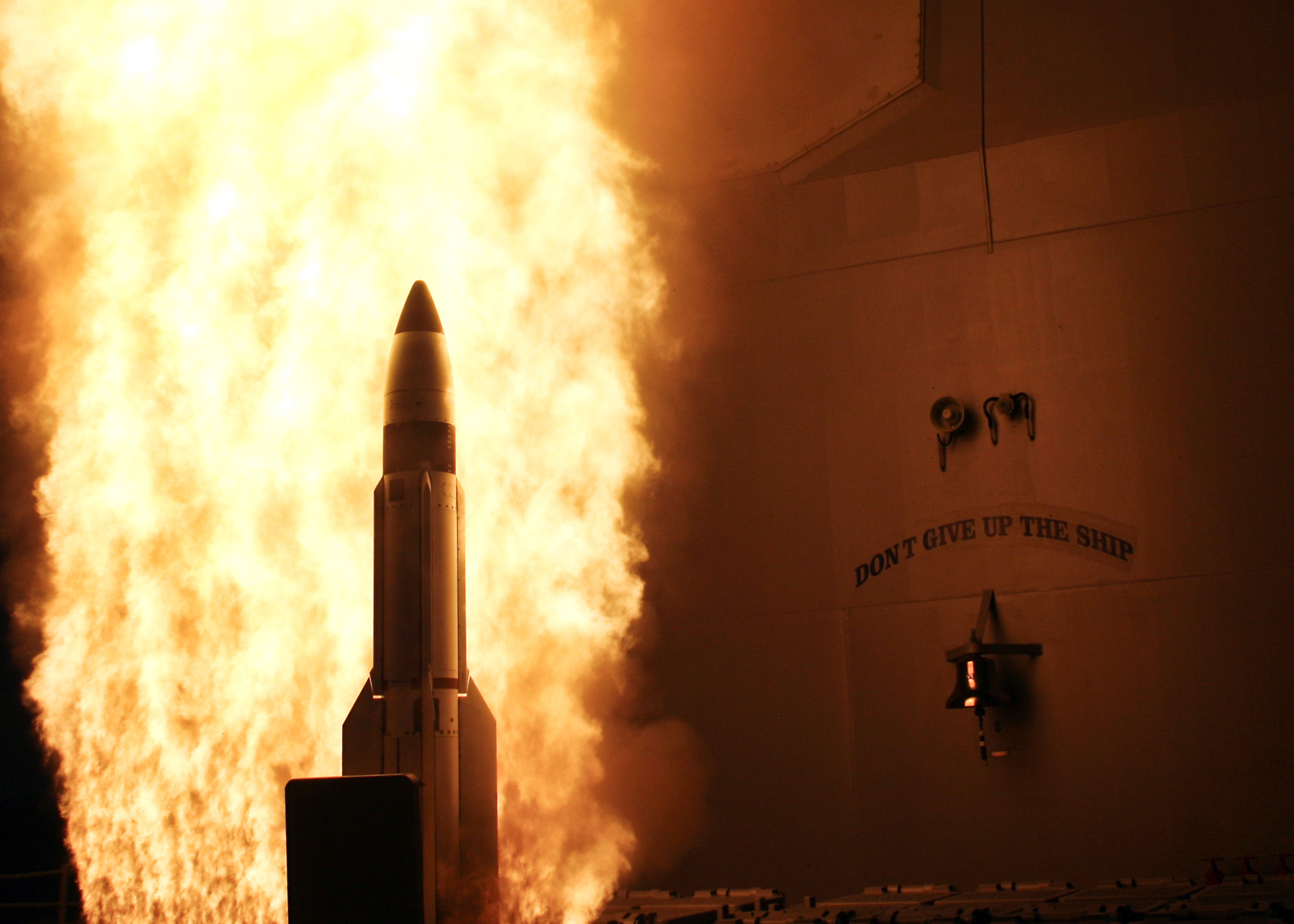
Lawrence's last words are memorialized on the Ticonderoga-class cruiser USS Lake Erie.

He was honored with a Congressional Gold Medal and the Thanks of Congress.

Many places are named for Captain Lawrence, including:

- Lawrence, Indiana
- Lawrence County, Alabama
- Lawrence County, Arkansas
- Lawrence County, Illinois
- Lawrence County, Indiana
- Lawrence County, Kentucky
- Lawrence County, Missouri
- Lawrence County, Mississippi
- Lawrence County, Ohio
- Lawrence County, Pennsylvania (Indirectly, as this county is named in honor of the sacrifices of the USS Lawrence (1813), a namesake of Captain Lawrence.)
- Lawrence County, Tennessee
- Lawrence Park Township, Erie County, Pennsylvania
- Lawrenceburg, Kentucky
- Lawrenceburg, Tennessee
- Lawrenceville, Georgia
- Lawrenceville, Illinois
- Lawrenceville, New Jersey, Also home to the prestigious Lawrenceville School
- Lawrenceville, a neighborhood of Pittsburgh PA.
- Lawrenceville, Pennsylvania, a borough in Tioga County.
- Lawrence Township, Marion County, Indiana and the municipality of Lawrence, Indiana contained therein.
- Lawrence Township, Mercer County, New Jersey and its Lawrenceville neighborhood.
- Lawrence Township, Cumberland County, New Jersey
- Captain Lawrence Drive in South Salem, NY, from which the Captain Lawrence Brewing Company of nearby Pleasantville takes its name.
- Lawrence Street in Montgomery, Alabama is named in honor of Lawrence. It runs parallel to streets named after other Barbary War/War of 1812 naval heroes: McDonough Street, named for Thomas Macdonough; Perry Street, named for Oliver Hazard Perry; Decatur Street, named for Stephen Decatur; Hull Street, named for Isaac Hull and Bainbridge Street, named in honor of William Bainbridge.
- Lawrence Avenue in Norman, Oklahoma is named in honor of Lawrence.

His birthplace of Burlington, New Jersey, has a Captain James Lawrence Elementary School.

In addition, the U.S. Navy has named five ships USS Lawrence.

- The first USS Lawrence (1813) was a brig which acted as then-Master Commandant Oliver Hazard Perry's flagship during the Battle of Lake Erie until she was destroyed in that action.
- The second USS Lawrence (1843) was also a brig, serving from 1843–1846.
- The third USS Lawrence (DD-8) was a 400-ton destroyer, commissioned in 1903 and serving until 1920.
- The fourth USS Lawrence (DD-250) was a Clemson-class destroyer, serving from 1921 to 1945
- The fifth USS Lawrence (DDG-4) was a Charles F. Adams-class destroyer. Commissioned in 1962, she served until 1994. This ship was christened by Mrs. Dorothy Redmond Hubbard, Capt. Lawrence's great-great-grand-daughter, who at the time was his oldest living descendant.

== See also ==
- Hunter–Lawrence–Jessup House – Family home in Woodbury
