= USS Lawrence (DD-250) =

Clemson-class destroyer

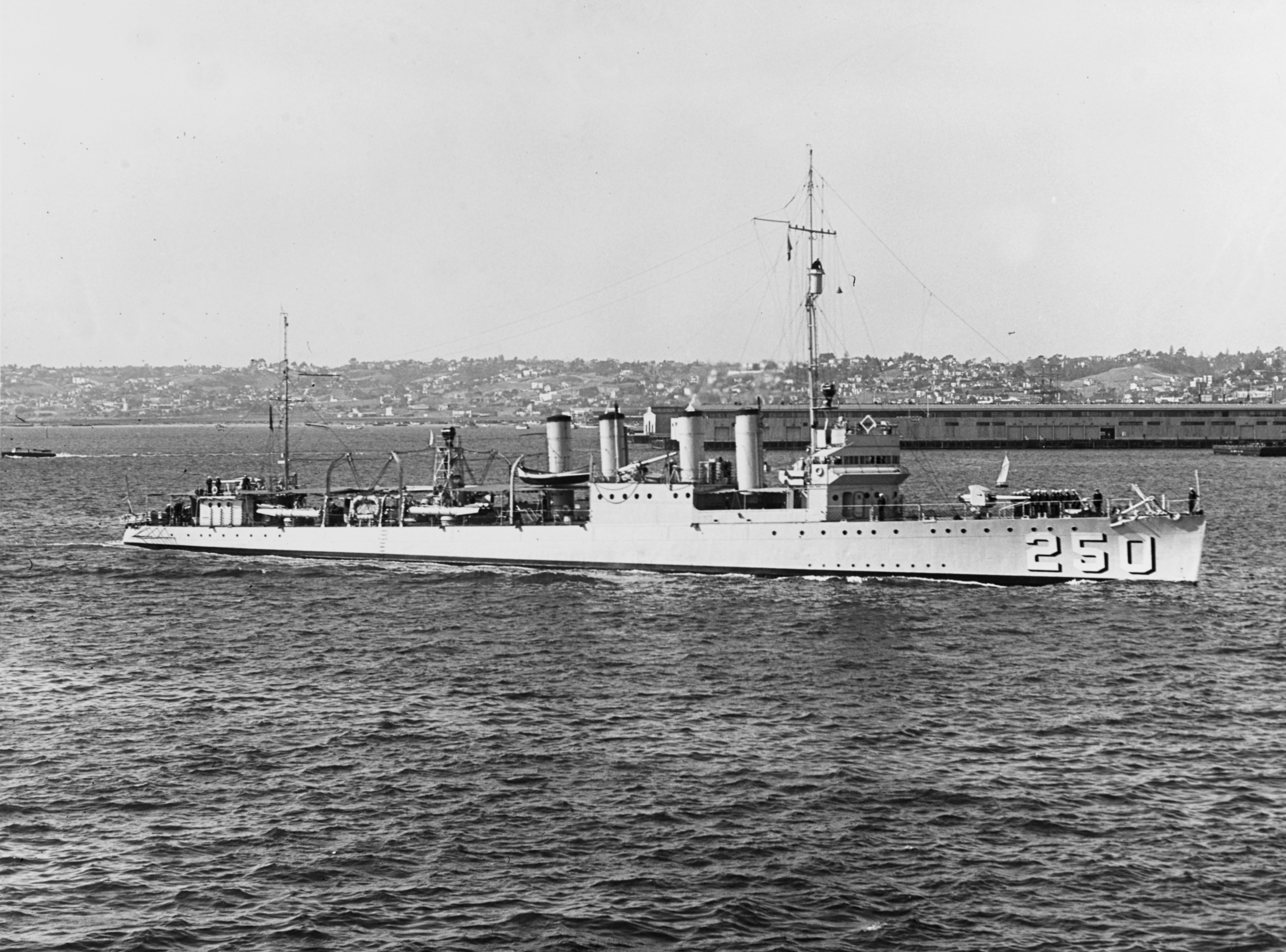

History

United States
- Namesake: James Lawrence
- Builder: New York Shipbuilding
- Laid down: 14 August 1919
- Launched: 10 July 1920
- Commissioned: 18 April 1921
- Decommissioned: 24 October 1945
- Stricken: 13 August 1945
- Fate: Sold for scrap, 1 October 1946

General characteristics
- Class & type: Clemson-class destroyer
- Displacement: 1,190 tons
- Length: 314 feet 5 inches (95.83 m)
- Beam: 31 feet 8 inches (9.65 m)
- Draft: 9 feet 3 inches (2.82 m)
- Propulsion: 26,500 shp (20 MW); geared turbines, 2 screws
- Speed: 30 knots (56 km/h)
- Range: 4,900 nautical miles (9,100 kilometres); @ 15 kt
- Complement: 101 officers and enlisted
- Armament: 4 x 4 in (100 mm) guns, 1 x 3 in (76 mm) gun, 12 x 21 inch (533 mm) tt.

The fourth USS Lawrence (DD-250) was a Clemson-class destroyer in the United States Navy during World War II. She was named for James Lawrence.

Lawrence was laid down 14 August 1919 and launched 10 July 1920 by New York Shipbuilding Corporation; sponsored by Miss Ruth Lawrence, and commissioned 18 April 1921.

== History ==
After shakedown Lawrence was assigned to the Destroyer Force Atlantic Fleet. Departing Newport, Rhode Island 13 June 1922, the destroyer sailed for the Mediterranean and joined Naval Forces at Constantinople 4 July. For the next year she cruised in the eastern Mediterranean and Black Sea during the Crimean crisis. During this time of upheaval throughout the Near East and south Russia, she rendered aid to American commercial personnel, Red Cross workers, and U.S. Food Administration officials who were assisting the stricken inhabitants. Lawrence together with other American destroyers also evacuated thousands of Greek refugees from areas of Asia Minor which had been occupied by Turkish Forces. The destroyer returned to New York 30 October 1923, and resumed operations with the Scouting Fleet.

She departed New York 3 January 1924 to join in Army-Navy exercises which tested the defenses and facilities of the Panama Canal. In August of that year Lawrence was stationed off Labrador during the Army around the world flight, returning to Boston, Massachusetts in September to resume operations with the Scouting Fleet. For the next 3 years she performed reserve training cruises, maneuvers along the east coast and engaged in simulated attack exercises on the Hawaiian Islands.

Lawrence detached from the Scouting Fleet 11 February 1927, and sailed off the coast of Nicaragua to protect American lives and property during the Civil War then underway in that country. The destroyer departed the Nicaraguan coast 5 weeks later, and she resumed her cruising cycle with the Scouting Fleet, continuing these operations until she decommissioned at Philadelphia 6 January 1931.

Lawrence recommissioned 13 June 1932 and departed Philadelphia 15 August to join the Pacific Fleet. From her arrival San Diego, California 8 September until 1938, she operated continuously with Pacific destroyer squadrons, engaging in fleet tactical and strategic exercises along the coast and fleet problems off the Panama Canal Zone and Hawaii. She decommissioned at San Diego 13 September 1938.

== World War II ==
Once again Lawrence recommissioned 26 September 1939 and sailed 2 months later for maneuvers and patrol in the Caribbean. Following training operations, she arrived at Boston 1 March 1940, and later that month was assigned to the east coast sound school at New London, Connecticut. The destroyer conducted tactical exercises along the east coast until 3 December when she steamed for the Pacific.

Arriving at San Francisco, California on the 27th, she was later assigned to the Sound School at San Diego, continuing these operations until America's declaration of war on Japan. During the early months of the war the destroyer performed convoy escort operations between San Francisco and Seattle, Washington. Lawrence departed San Francisco 13 August 1942 to escort a troop convoy en route to Kodiak, Alaska, arriving there 7 days later. For the next month the destroyer covered convoy approaches between Kodiak, Dutch Harbor, and Adak before returning to San Francisco 27 September.

Based at Treasure Island, California for the rest of the war, Lawrence served on patrol and escort operations to the approaches of San Francisco Bay. On 31 May 1944, the destroyer rescued 192 men of SS Henry Bergh which had grounded on the Farallon Islands, then resumed patrol and escort operations. After the war, Lawrence departed San Francisco 28 August 1945, arriving Philadelphia 20 September.

She decommissioned at Philadelphia 24 October 1945 and was sold to Boston Metal Company, Baltimore, Maryland, on 1 October 1946.
