= USS Brough =

1943 Edsall-class destroyer escort

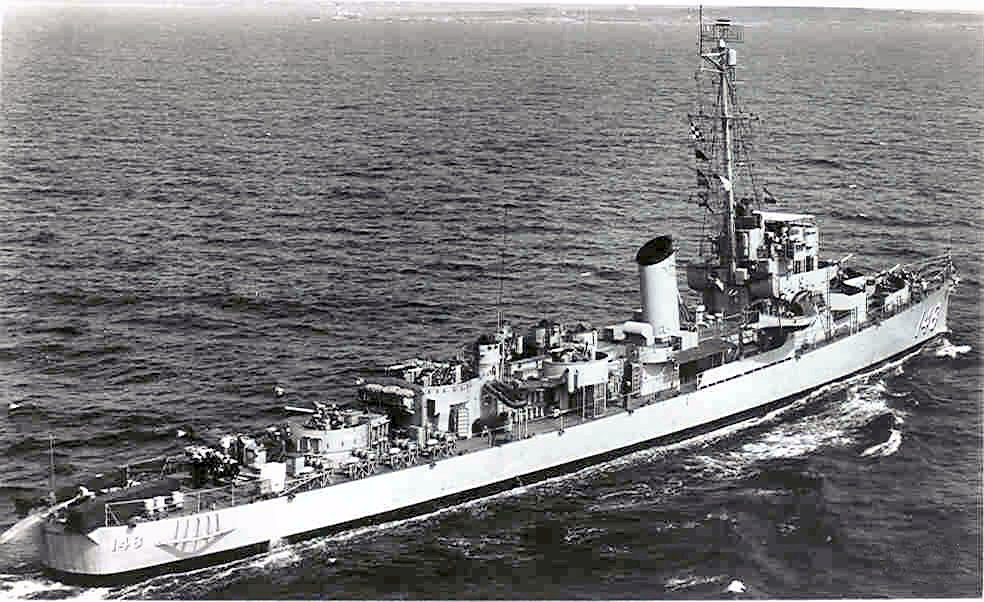
- USS Brough (DE-148)

History

United States
- Namesake: David Atkins Brough
- Builder: Consolidated Steel Corporation, Orange, Texas
- Laid down: 22 January 1943
- Launched: 10 April 1943
- Commissioned: 18 September 1943 to 22 March 1946; 7 September 1951 to June 1965
- Stricken: 1 November 1965
- Motto: Frontier Guardian, In Peace, In War
- Fate: Sold for scrap in 1967

General characteristics
- Class & type: Edsall-class destroyer escort
- Displacement: 1,253 tons standard; 1,590 tons full load
- Length: 306 feet (93.27 m)
- Beam: 36.58 feet (11.15 m)
- Draft: 10.42 full load feet (3.18 m)
- Propulsion: 4 FM diesel engines, 4 diesel-generators, 6,000 shp (4.5 MW), 2 screws
- Speed: 21 knots (39 km/h)
- Range: 9,100 nmi. at 12 knots; (17,000 km at 22 km/h)
- Complement: 8 officers, 201 enlisted
- Armament: 3 × single 3 in (76 mm)/50 guns; 1 × twin 40 mm AA guns; 8 × single 20 mm AA guns; 1 × triple 21 in (533 mm) torpedo tubes; 8 × depth charge projectors; 1 × depth charge projector (hedgehog); 2 × depth charge tracks

USS Brough (DE-148) was an Edsall class destroyer escort of the United States Navy.

== Namesake ==
David Atkins Brough was born on 15 June 1914 in Pueblo, Colorado. He was appointed as a Naval Aviation Cadet, United States Naval Reserve in October 1939 and was appointed Ensign on 30 July 1940. At the beginning of World War II, Lieutenant (junior grade) Brough, attached to Patrol Squadron 42, flew scouting missions along the Alaskan Coast and participated in regular bombing raids on the Japanese held islands of Attu and Kiska. During June 1942, Brough participated in numerous bombing raids on Japanese shipping in Kiska Harbor, For this action he was recommended for the Air Medal. However, before the Air Medal could be presented to him he was killed in an airplane crash following a scouting mission. The Air Medal was presented posthumously to his sister, Miss Jack Bell.

== History ==
=== Construction and commissioning ===
Brough was built by the Consolidated Steel Corporation of Orange, Texas. Her keel was laid on 22 January 1943 and she was launched on 10 April 1943. Mrs. Jack Bell, sister of Lieutenant Brough, served as sponsor. Brough was placed in full commission on 18 September 1943 at Orange, Texas under command of Lieutenant Commander Kenneth J. Hartley of Jamestown, New York.

After an intense shakedown period, Brough was assigned the task of escorting allied shipping to European ports. She spent two years escorting Allied shipping without the loss of a single vessel during her twenty four Atlantic crossings, and made only five submarine attacks with the presence of U-boats unverified in each case.

=== At war ===
Wind and sea, ice and fog, furnished relentless diversion however, for unspectacular service. Five of her twenty-five months of active duty were spent in repair yards, where the scars of the North Atlantic were smoothed again as she prepared for new crossings. Her first Commanding Officer Lieutenant Commander K. J. Hartley was killed when heavy seas smashed him against the splinter shield of her number one gun.

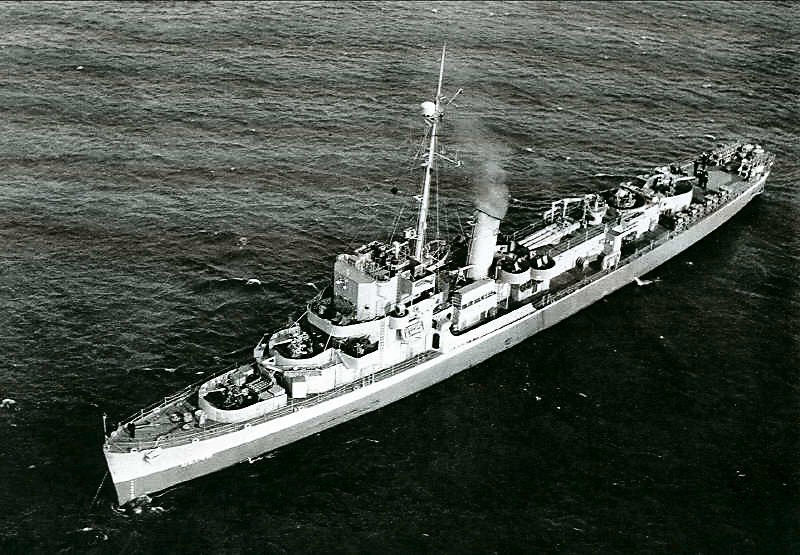
USS Brough (DE-148) at anchor, circa in 1944.

Brough, under constant and intensive training throughout the war expended 4,050 rounds of 3 inches (76 mm) 50 cal., 15,180 rounds of 40 mm, and 25,093 rounds of 20 mm—all for practice. During anti-submarine actions, 200 depth charges and 372 projectiles were fired. When Brough was commissioned her armament included torpedo tubes, eight 20mm guns, a twin 40 mm and three 3"/5O cal. guns. But as the pattern of warfare shifted from surface to air actions, repeated alterations resulted in the removal of the torpedoes, and the addition of another twin and a quad 40 mm, along with two more 20 mm.

At sea for 373 days of her 25 months active duty, most of the time she was on war patrol, with her guns manned and full watches alerted.

=== Second tragedy ===
The second and last death on Brough during World War II was the result of the accidental discharge of a K-gun, when a crewman was killed.

=== Post-war preservation ===
In January 1947, Brough was placed out of commission in reserve, attached to the Florida Group, U.S. Atlantic Fleet at Green Cove, Florida, Brough was anchored at Green Cove Springs, Florida, forty statute miles (60 km) from the sea in the sluggish St. Johns River.

=== Korea ===
The Korean Emergency in the summer of 1951 brought Brough back into naval service. Thoroughly overhauled by the Merrill-Stevens Shipyard, Jacksonville, Florida, Brough was commissioned 7 September 1951 . She was attached to the U.S. Atlantic Fleet and usual intensive shakedown period followed.

=== Atlantic Fleet service ===
In the fall of 1952 Brough participated in joint NATO operations in the Atlantic and visited various European ports including Bergen, Norway; Greenwich, Scotland; Cherbourg, France; and various Caribbean ports. Returning in November Brough reported for scheduled shipyard overhaul in Philadelphia until the end of February. After a week of "shakedown" she steamed to Guantanamo Bay, Cuba for refresher training. Despite a green crew, Brough's training progress was such that she was released one week early; the only ship thus privileged during 1953. Brough, after a short stay in Newport, Rhode Island left in early June for Key West, Florida, where she reported to provide services to the Fleet Sonar School, Key West. Until late August Brough operated daily, acting primarily as a school ship for officers and enlisted students from the Sonar School.

Upon Brough's return from Key West she berthed alongside the Yosemite (AD-19) for tender overhaul. The tender discovered that the generators warranted overhaul and Brough was sent to the Portsmouth Naval Shipyard in Kittery, Maine for repairs.

In November 1953, Brough, as flagship for Commander Escort Squadron Fourteen participated in Operation SPRING BOARD in the Caribbean and visited San Juan, Puerto Rico; Ciudad Trujillo, Dominican Republic; and Saint Thomas, U.S. Virgin Islands. Brough returned to Newport, in December, for the Christmas leave period, and then operated on a daily basis from Newport. In March 1954 Brough again returned to Key West until July for another tour of ASW training sea phase.

Brough in company with Huse, Blair and M. J. Manuel journeyed to Newfoundland for a three weeks fleet exercise with submarines.

Returning in mid-September, Brough started preparations for the Joint Atlantic Fleet Exercise of 1954. Brough's assignment was operating against submarines off the Labrador Coast in the vicinity of Hamilton's Inlet. Accordingly, extra foul weather clothing was loaded aboard in anticipation of the many cold watches that were to come. On 20 October, Brough, in company with the rest of the squadron, departed on her biggest operation LANTFLEX 1-55. First Brough participated in convoy escort work to Labrador; anti-submarine patrol, and then she escorted a force making amphibious landings along the coast of North Carolina. After thirty days continuous steaming, on 20 November Brough returned to Newport for a much welcomed Christmas leave period.

Brough reported to the Boston Navy Yard for overhaul and modification to equipment in February 1955 and completed the refitting on 30 April 1955. In May Brough spent two weeks at the Portsmouth Naval Shipyard, Maine, undergoing a restricted availability. An intensive three-week refresher program at Newport followed in June. On 9 July 1955 Brough departed from Norfolk, Virginia on the first leg of Midshipman Cruise Baker. This cruise included Edinburgh, Scotland; Copenhagen, Denmark; and finally Guantanamo Bay, Cuba as ports-of-call. On completion of this cruise, on 3 September, Brough was given a two-week upkeep and tender availability period in Newport and then reported on 25 September 1955 to provide services to Fleet Sonar School, Key West. Upon returning to Newport, in November Brough was given a two-week availability alongside the USS Yosemite, followed by two weeks of type training out of Newport. On 13 December 1955 the holiday leave started. This period also saw Brough's first berthing at the new Destroyer Pier Number 1. On completion of one week of type training in the Newport area Brough moored alongside the USS Yosemite on 30 January 1956 for ten days availability.

Early on the morning of 13 February 1956, Brough sailed with Escort Squadron Fourteen for Key West, Florida. From 20 February until 30 March Brough again provided services for Fleet Sonar School. Afterwards Brough engaged in type training out of Newport during April and participated in exercises CONVEX and HOURGLASS under Commander Antisubmarine Atlantic during May and June. After three weeks of upkeep the ship departed for a six-week restricted availability at Portsmouth, New Hampshire to prepare for Operation DEEPFREEZE II. Brough received the Battle Efficiency "E" Plaque.

=== Deepfreeze II ===
On 4 September 1956, Brough departed Newport, R.I. to join Task Force 43 in Operation DEEPFREEZE II. Steaming independently by way of the Panama Canal, Brough reached Dunedin, New Zealand one month later. From October 1956 to March 1957, Brough operated out of Dunedin on her assigned picket station at 57° South - 170° East. Her assignment: act as weather reporting, communication and search and rescue ship in an area where high winds and forty foot waves were not uncommon. The pattern of operations was five or six days in port, nineteen to twenty-one days at sea. En route to station Brough occasionally made calls at isolated Campbell Island, New Zealand.

=== Deepfreeze III ===
The return trip to Newport R.I. began 2 March 1957. On the way, Brough visited Callao, Peru, and stopped briefly at Newport before continuing to Boston Naval Shipyard where on 8 May, she commenced an overhaul period in preparation for DEEPFREEZE III.

After completing the regular overhaul in July, Brough returned to Newport and continued preparation for DEEPFREEZE III. The period 19–23 August was spent alongside the tender Yellowstone (AD-27) completing preparations for seven months independent duty.

On 26 August Brough departed Newport, R.I. for Dunedin, N.Z. via Panama Canal, arriving 25 September. During the deployment with DEEPFREEZE III, Brough made five trips to 61° South 170° East. One trip took her across the Antarctic Circle, on 5 February 1958 a "first" for Destroyer Escorts. On three occasions 75-knot (139 km/h or 86 mph) winds were encountered, but Brough came through with negligible damage.

Brough left Dunedin, N.Z. for. Newport, R.I. in March 1958, arriving 2 April. During April she enjoyed a tender, leave, and upkeep period—before departing for her new home port, Key West, Florida. From 5 May until 21 July, Brough operated with Fleet Sonar School, Key West. During that period, CORTRON 14 was disestablished and Brough joined Destroyer Division Six Zero One.

=== Deepfreeze IV ===
Between 21 July and 22 August 1958, preparations were made for DEEPFREEZE IV. On 23 August 1958, Brough departed for her third trip to Dunedin, N.Z. and her third consecutive year under the operational control of Commander Task Force 43. Arriving in Dunedin on 22 September, she departed almost immediately to continue her usual duties on station between New Zealand and Antarctica. Between 23 August and 19 November, Brough was at sea 78 days and in port only 8 days.

When Brough left Dunedin, N.Z. for the last time, on 7 February 1959, four thousand New Zealanders were there to see her sail, indicative of the excellent relations that existed between Brough personnel and the citizens of Dunedin.

=== Another first ===
The return trip to Key West represented another "achievement", "first" Destroyer Escort to circumnavigate the world alone. Ports of call during the next 66 days included Perth, Australia; Colombo, Ceylon; Aden, Arabia; Athens, Greece; Naples, Italy; Cannes, France; Barcelona, Spain and Gibraltar. Arriving in Key West, Florida on 14 April 1959, a two-week tender availability period was followed by leave and upkeep lasting until 22 May. Following this, Brough deployed for ten days off Puerto Rico as a missile recovery ship for the famous Jupiter missile that carried two monkeys, Alfa and Bravo, into space. Brough's commanding officer was in command of the recovery group.

Between 1 July and 29 September 1959 Brough underwent a regular shipyard overhaul in Key West.

After the overhaul period, Brough provided services to Fleet Sonar School until departing for refresher training at Guantanamo Bay, Cuba. Underway refresher training from 17 October to 24 November molded the ship into a more effective fighting unit. An upkeep period followed by a leave period kept the ship in Key West until after New Year's Day.

Beginning in January 1960, Brough settled into a regular schedule of providing services for Fleet Sonar School, Key West. She traveled to Charleston, South Carolina for tender availability between 29 February and 10 March 1960. Returning to Key West, Fleet Sonar School operations during the spring of 1960 were broken by occasional weeks of upkeep and type training. On 14 May 1960, Brough journeyed to Norfolk, Va., for tender availability alongside Sierra (AD-18), returning to Key West on 31 May. Over 4 July, Brough visited Tampa, Florida, returning to provide services to Fleet Sonar School until 18 August.

While en route to Norfolk again, in late August Brough stopped over in Fort Lauderdale, Florida for a recreational visit before a period of availability alongside Amphion (AR-13) at Norfolk Va. Skirting Hurricane Donna with no damage in mid-September, she returned to Key West for Fleet Sonar School operations.

Training at Guantanamo Bay between 8 and 12 October was followed by liberty and recreation in Montego Bay, Jamaica. Brough again provided services to Fleet Sonar School until the next tender availability alongside Sierra (AD-18) in Norfolk, 14 November to 1 December.

After the Christmas leave period Brough was once again providing services of Fleet Sonar School until 5 February 1961. On 7 February, Brough departed for a three-day visit to Nassau in the Bahamas and continued to Norfolk, Virginia for an availability alongside Tutuila (ARG-4) from 13 to 24 February.

Operations out of Key West from March to May were interrupted by a week of upkeep and a week of type training. At the end of April, Brough visited Miami, Florida to represent the U.S. Navy at the Miami Beach Serviceman's Center's Ninth Anniversary celebration.

=== Miss USA and Miss Finland and another 'E' ===
A period of upkeep and restricted availability at U.S. Naval Station, Key West began 1 May. An In Service inspection was conducted 11 to 12 May. From 21 May Fleet Sonar School operations continued through the summer, interrupted by a return visit to Miami 14 – 16 July, a week of type training during August, and two weeks of upkeep. While in Miami, Brough was favored by a visit from Miss USA, a finalist in the Miss Universe Pageant. Miss Finland (Ritva Wachter) also visited the ship.

On 15 July 1961, Commander Destroyer Force, U.S. Atlantic Fleet announced that Brough won the Battle Efficiency Award for "Competitive Excellence" in Destroyer Division 601 for fiscal year 1961—the second "E" for Brough. During the remainder of 1961 and early 1962 Brough continued operating out of Key West to provide training to student officers and enlisted personnel from Fleet Sonar School in various phases of anti-submarine warfare.

August 1962, Brough arrive in Boston, Massachusetts. Brough sat next to USS Johnston, USS John Willis, USS Albany, USS Edisto, USS Gearing, USS APL-54 and others.

September 1962, Brough went to the Coast of Cuba alongside USS Hissen, USS Betelgeuse and other ships.

In October 1962, Brough sortied from Key West was part of the task force of U.S. naval vessels operating in the vicinity of Cuba during the Cuban Missile Crisis.

December 1962, Brough’s picture of her were taken in Key West.

=== Decommissioning and disposal ===
Brough decommissioned in June 1965 and was removed from the Navy List on 1 November 1965. The ship was sold for scrap to Buyer Boston Metals Company in Baltimore, Maryland in January 1967.

== Awards ==
- American Campaign Medal
- European-African-Middle Eastern Campaign Medal
- World War II Victory Medal
- National Defense Service Medal
- Antarctic Service Medal (3 awards)
