= Mark 11 missile launcher =

Mark 11 Guided Missile Launching System
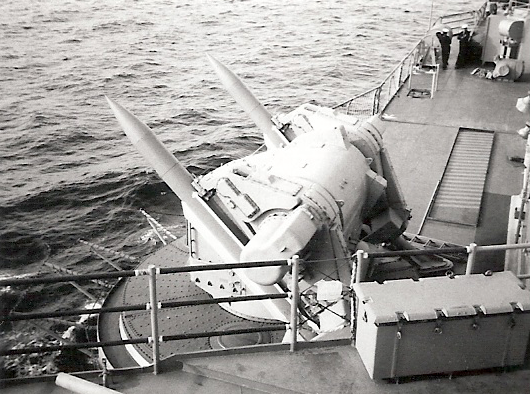
- RIM-24 Tartar blue and white Training Surface to Air Missiles (T-SAMs) being displayed on the port Mark 11 launcher of the guided missile cruiser USS Chicago
- Type: Guided Missile Launching System
- Place of origin: United States

Service history
- Used by: United States Navy
- Wars: Cold War; Vietnam War

Specifications
- Rate of fire: 1 Tartar salvo every 20 seconds

The Mark 11 guided missile launching system (GMLS) is a twin-arm missile launcher designed for use on frigates and other military vessels.

The launcher could use the RIM-24 Tartar or RIM-66 Standard MR missile and was used on Albany-class cruisers and the first thirteen Charles F. Adams-class destroyers. The destroyers had one launcher at the rear of the ship while the cruisers had 2 launchers mounted amidships on either side of the ship. New Threat Upgrade added the ability to launch RGM-84 Harpoon anti-ship missiles. Its 42-round magazine consists of two concentric rings of vertically stored missiles, 24 in the outer ring and 18 in the inner. The single armed Mark 13 missile launcher was similar in size and footprint and was used in the later Charles F. Adams class destroyers instead of the Mark 11.

== Usage ==
- Albany-class cruiser
- Charles F. Adams-class destroyer

== Gallery ==
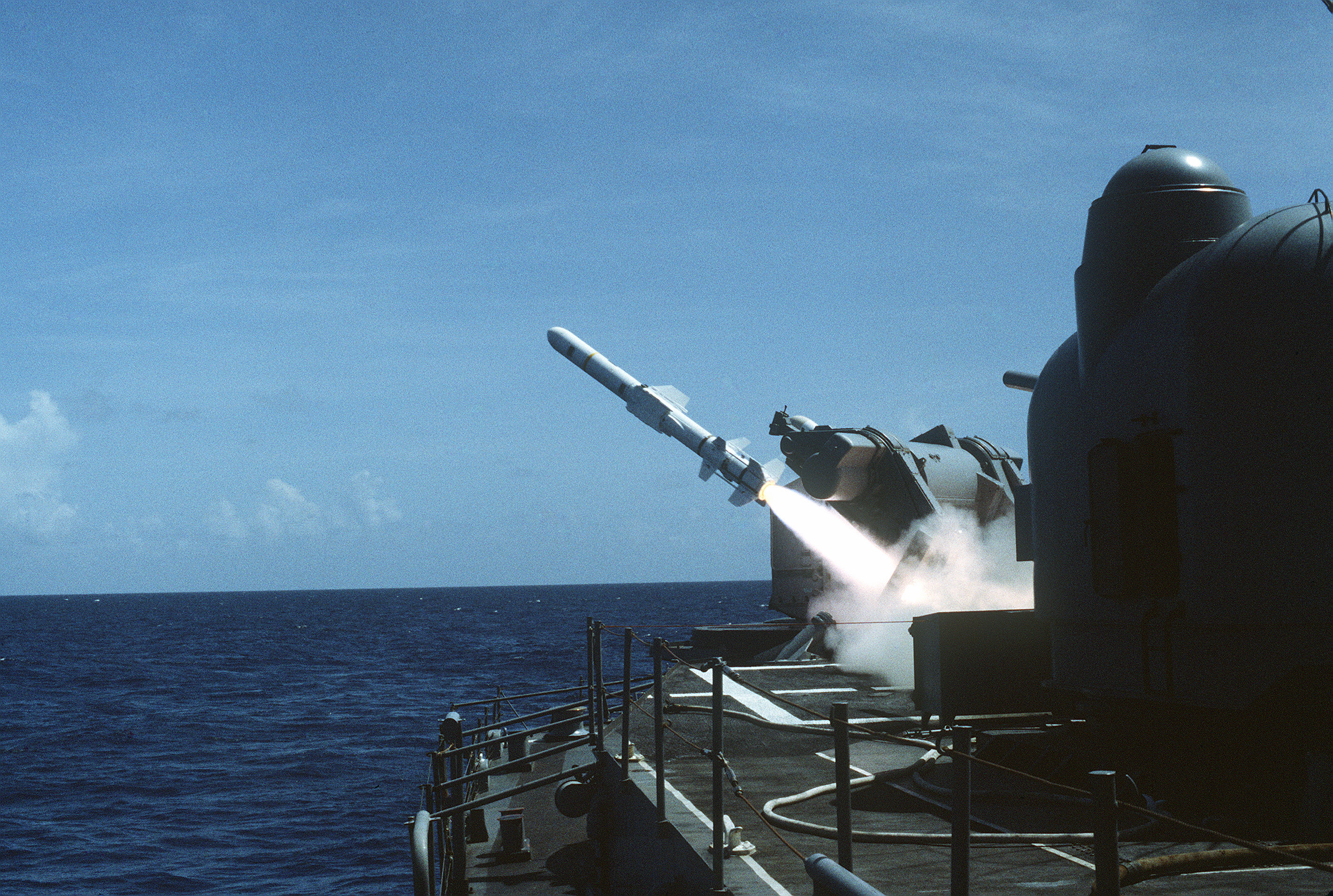
An RGM-84A Harpoon antiship cruise missile is fired from USS Lawrence

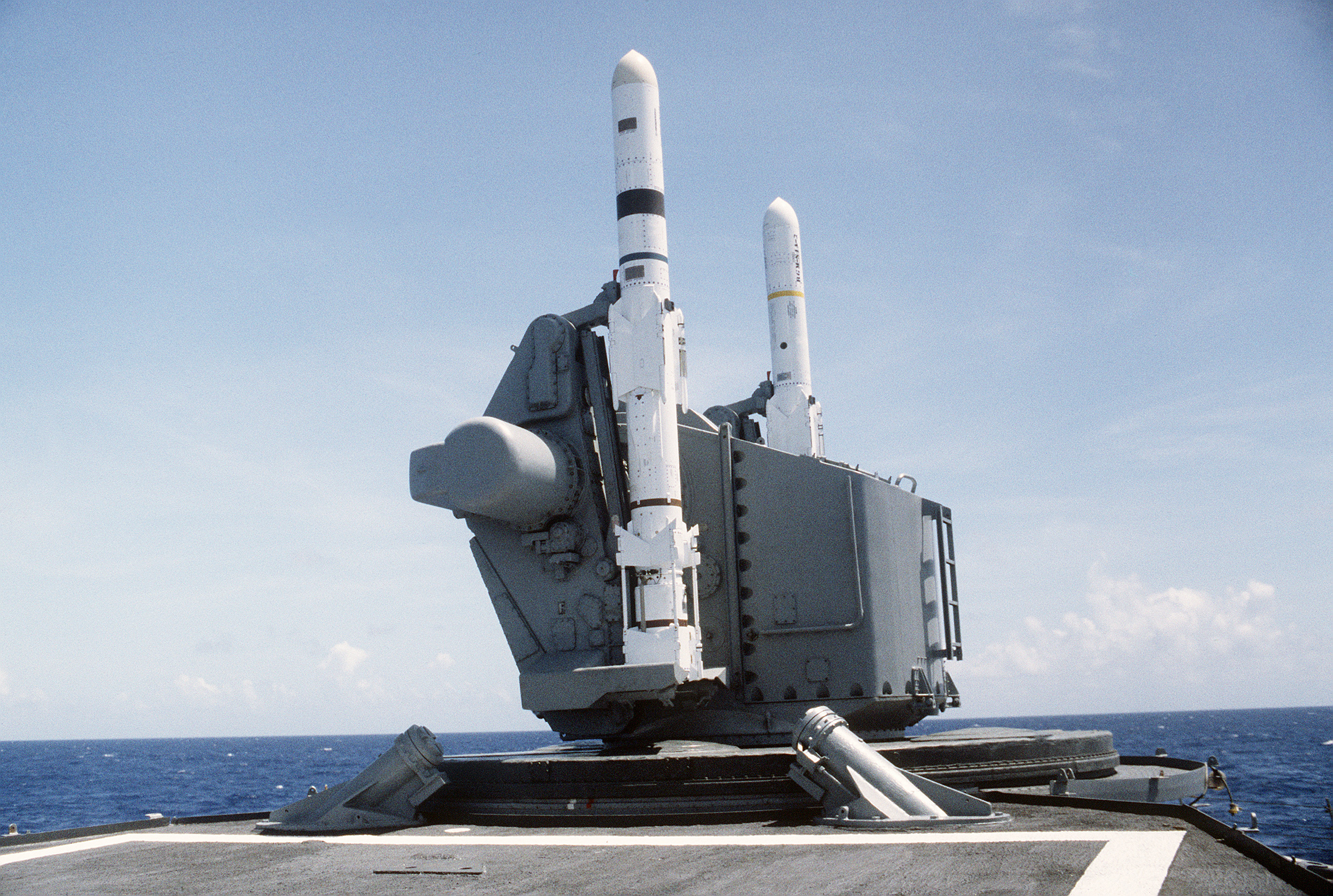
A pair of RGM-84A Harpoon missiles in loading position aboard USS Lawrence

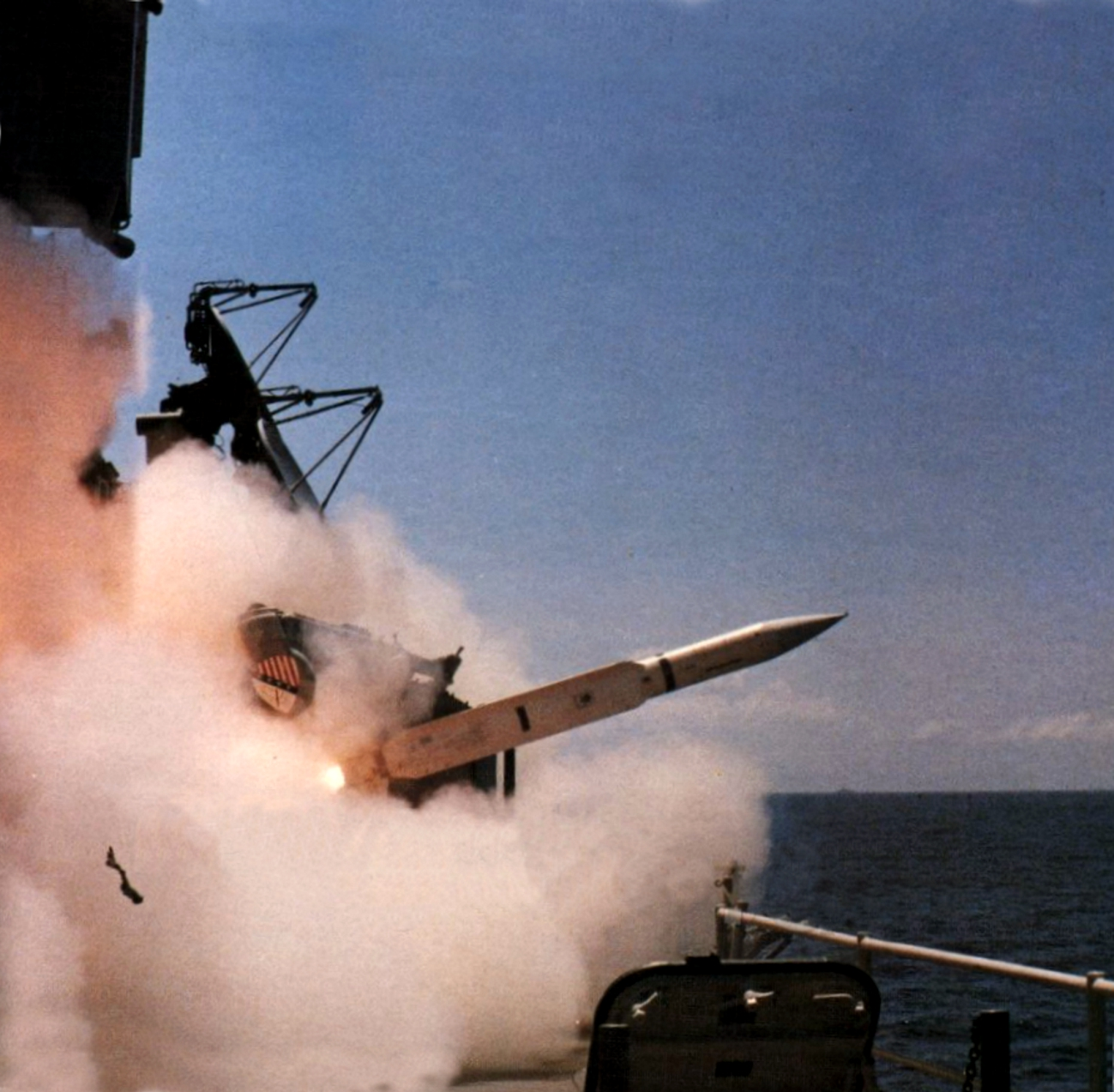
A RIM-24 Tartar missile is being launched from USS Chicago

== See also ==
- List of United States Navy Guided Missile Launching Systems
- Mark 13 missile launcher
