= USS Lawrence (DDG-4) =

Charles F. Adams-class destroyer

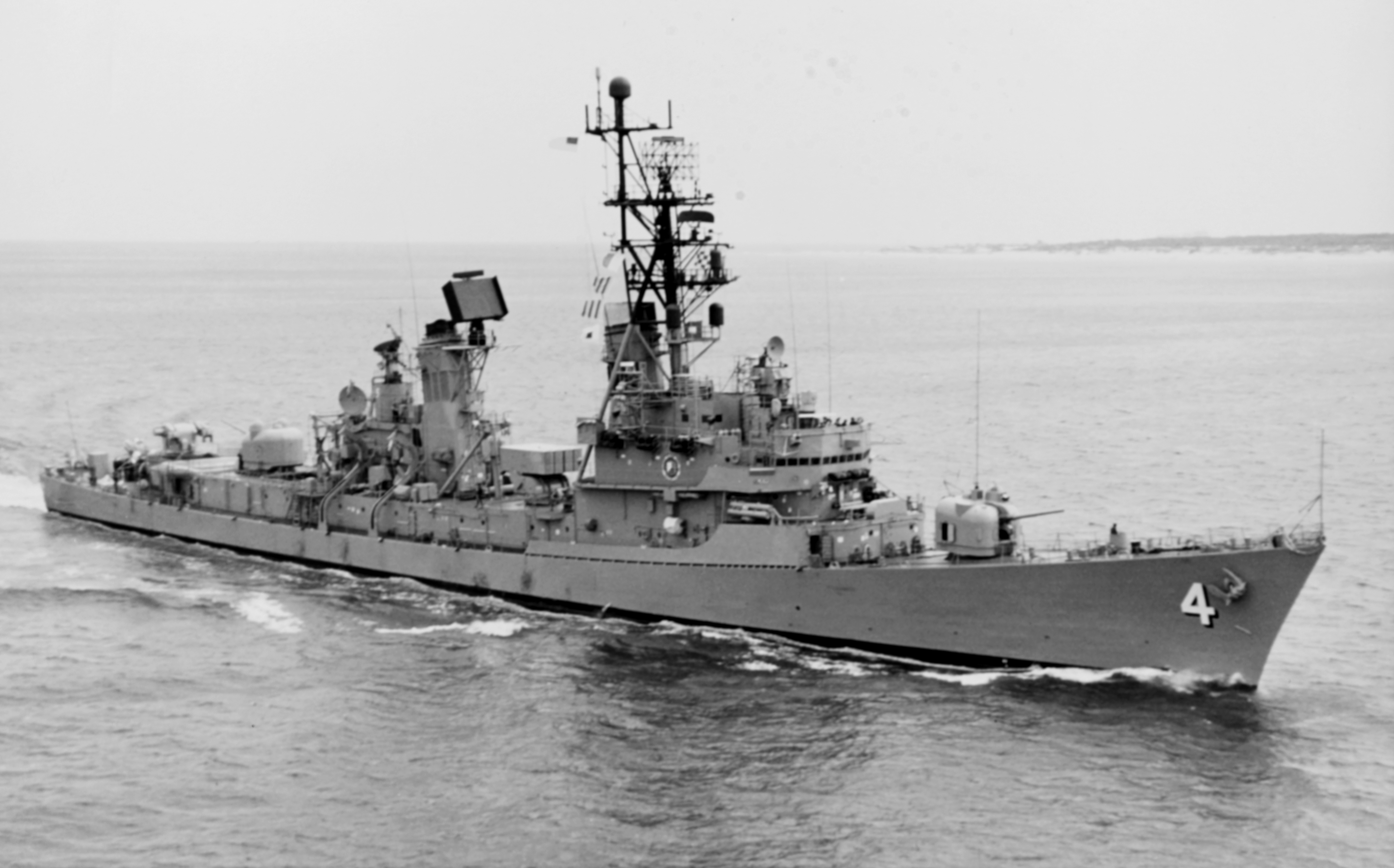
- USS Lawrence underway on 3 May 1973

History

United States
- Name: Lawrence
- Namesake: James Lawrence
- Ordered: 28 March 1957
- Builder: New York Shipbuilding Corporation
- Laid down: 27 October 1958
- Launched: 27 February 1960
- Acquired: 20 December 1961
- Commissioned: 6 January 1962
- Decommissioned: 30 March 1990
- Reclassified: DDG-4, 23 April 1957
- Stricken: 16 May 1990
- Identification: Callsign: NTQP; Hull number: DD-954
- Motto: Don't give up the ship
- Fate: Scrapped, 28 October 2004
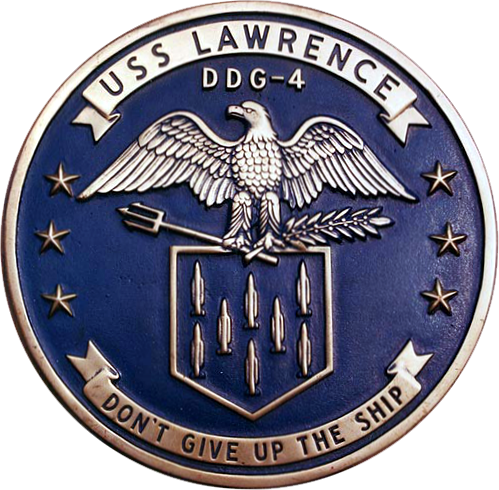
- Badge

General characteristics
- Class & type: Charles F. Adams-class destroyer
- Displacement: 3,277 tons standard, 4,526 full load
- Length: 437 ft (133 m)
- Beam: 47 ft (14 m)
- Draft: 15 ft (4.6 m)
- Propulsion: 2 × Westinghouse steam turbines providing 70,000 shp (52 MW); 2 shafts; 4 × Foster Wheeler 1,275 psi (8,790 kPa) boilers
- Speed: 33 knots (61 km/h; 38 mph)
- Range: 4,500 nautical miles (8,300 km) at 20 knots (37 km/h)
- Complement: 354 (24 officers, 330 enlisted)
- Sensors & processing systems: AN/SPS-39 3D air search radar; AN/SPS-10 surface search radar; AN/SPG-51 missile fire control radar; AN/SPG-53 gunfire control radar; AN/SQS-23 Sonar and the hull mounted SQQ-23 Pair Sonar for DDG-2 through 19; AN/SPS-40 Air Search Radar
- Armament: 1 Mk 11 missile launcher (DDG2-14) or Mk 13 single arm missile launcher (DDG-15-24) for RIM-24 Tartar SAM system, or later the RIM-66 Standard (SM-1) and Harpoon antiship missile; 2 × 5"/54 caliber Mark 42 (127 mm) gun; 1 × RUR-5 ASROC Launcher; 6 × 12.8 in (324 mm) ASW Torpedo Tubes (2 x Mark 32 Surface Vessel Torpedo Tubes)

USS Lawrence (DD-954/DDG-4) was a Charles F. Adams class guided-missile destroyer in the United States Navy. It was the fifth ship named after Captain James Lawrence USN (1781–1813). The USS Lawrence served on blockade duty during the Cuban Missile Crisis in October 1962 and, in 1972, was part of Operation Linebacker in the west Pacific.

== Construction and career ==
USS Lawrence was laid down by the New York Shipbuilding Corporation in Camden, New Jersey on 27 October 1958. The ship was launched on 27 February 1960, by Mrs. Fernie C. Hubbard, the great-great-granddaughter of Captain James Lawrence. The ship was commissioned on 6 January 1962. After a shakedown cruise on the Great Lakes, USS Lawrence proceeded to Naval Station Norfolk for duty in the Atlantic Fleet.

=== Cuban Missile Crisis ===
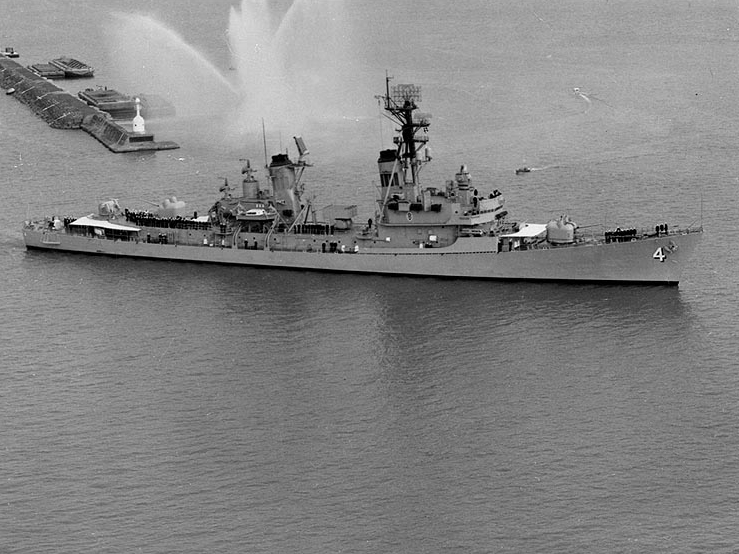
Lawrence in Buffalo Harbor, 1962

Following the rapid development of the Cuban Missile Crisis in October 1962, the warship deployed with Task Group 136.1, a surface quarantine group of cruisers composed of USS Canberra (CAG-2), USS Newport News (CA-148), three guided-missile destroyers including USS Lawrence, and twelve escorts. The group took up a blocking position north of Cuba on 24 October 1962, two days into the crisis. On Friday, 26 October 1962, USS Lawrence and MacDonough (DLG-8) began shadowing MT Grozny, a tanker proceeding towards Cuba. The next day, the Soviet Union agreed to defuse the crisis and military forces on both sides began standing down.

==== Mediterranean ====
After returning to Norfolk on 6 December 1962, USS Lawrence began the first of many Mediterranean cruises on 6 February 1963, steaming across the Atlantic to join the Sixth Fleet for operations in European waters, where she remained until 1 July 1963. Following a second Mediterranean deployment between April and August 1964, the warship received an extensive overhaul in Norfolk over the ensuing winter. Before the end of the decade, she conducted four more cruises; a Sixth Fleet deployment (24 August 1965 to 17 December 1965), a NATO exercise in the North Atlantic (3 August 1966 to 5 September 1966), another Mediterranean tour (27 September 1966 to 1 February 1967) and a third Sixth Fleet cruise (10 January 1968 to 4 May 1968). During her fourth Mediterranean deployment, USS Lawrence helped rescue crewmen from the sinking merchant vessel New Meadow, in distress off the coast of Crete.

=== Vietnam War ===
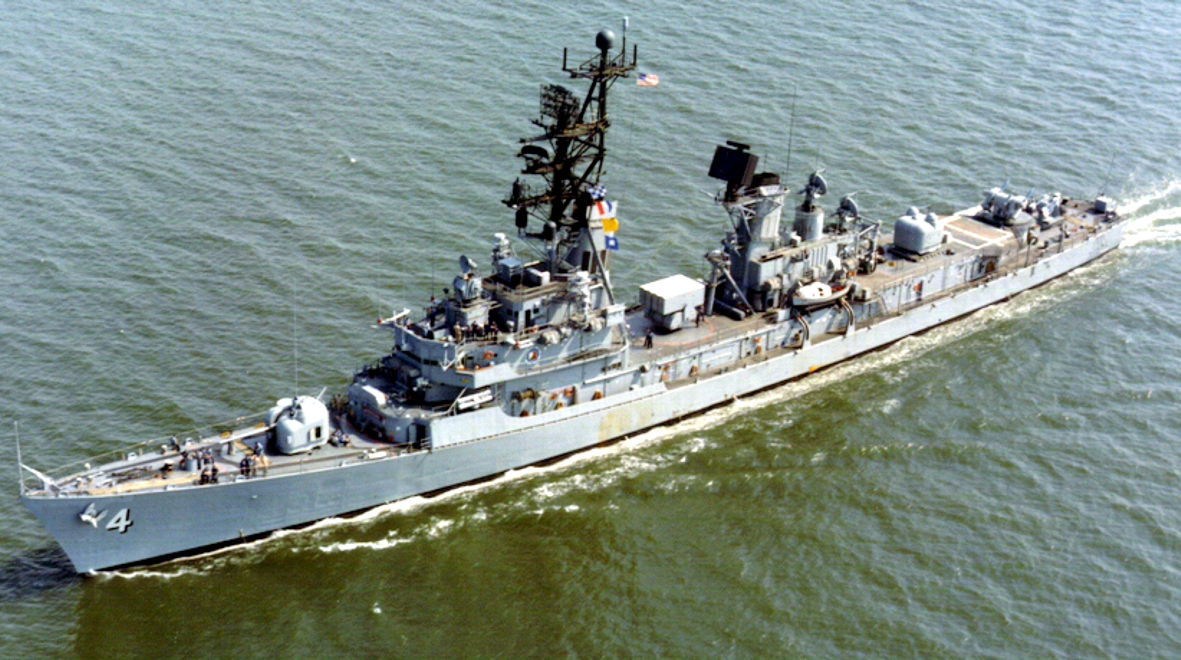
Lawrence underway in Hamtpon Roads in mid-1972

Following two additional Mediterranean deployments, one in 1969 and another in 1971, the much-traveled destroyer made one Vietnam War tour in the Western Pacific from 1972 to 1973, providing naval gunfire support, rescuing downed aviators and serving as plane guard during aircraft carrier operations. Among her guests on Yankee Station were the Chief of Naval Operations and Secretary of the Navy.

As the U.S.S. Lawrence came through the locks in the Panama canal, her sister ship was sabotaged by a crewman that dropped a large wrench into the main reduction gear shaft, causing her to be towed to San Diego for repairs while the USS Lawrence sailed on to Vietnam and engaged in Operation Linebacker. At the time, she was affectionately known as the "Leapin Larry" by her crew. For her service, she was awarded a Meritorious Unit Commendation.

==== Sixth Fleet ====
Two more Sixth Fleet cruises followed in 1977-78 and 1979, and during the latter she briefly visited the Black Sea. USS Lawrence circumnavigated Africa en route to the Indian Ocean and Persian Gulf, deployment that took place in 1974. USS Lawrence passed through the Mediterranean en route to the Indian Ocean and Persian Gulf, deployments that took place in 1980 and 1983 to 1984.

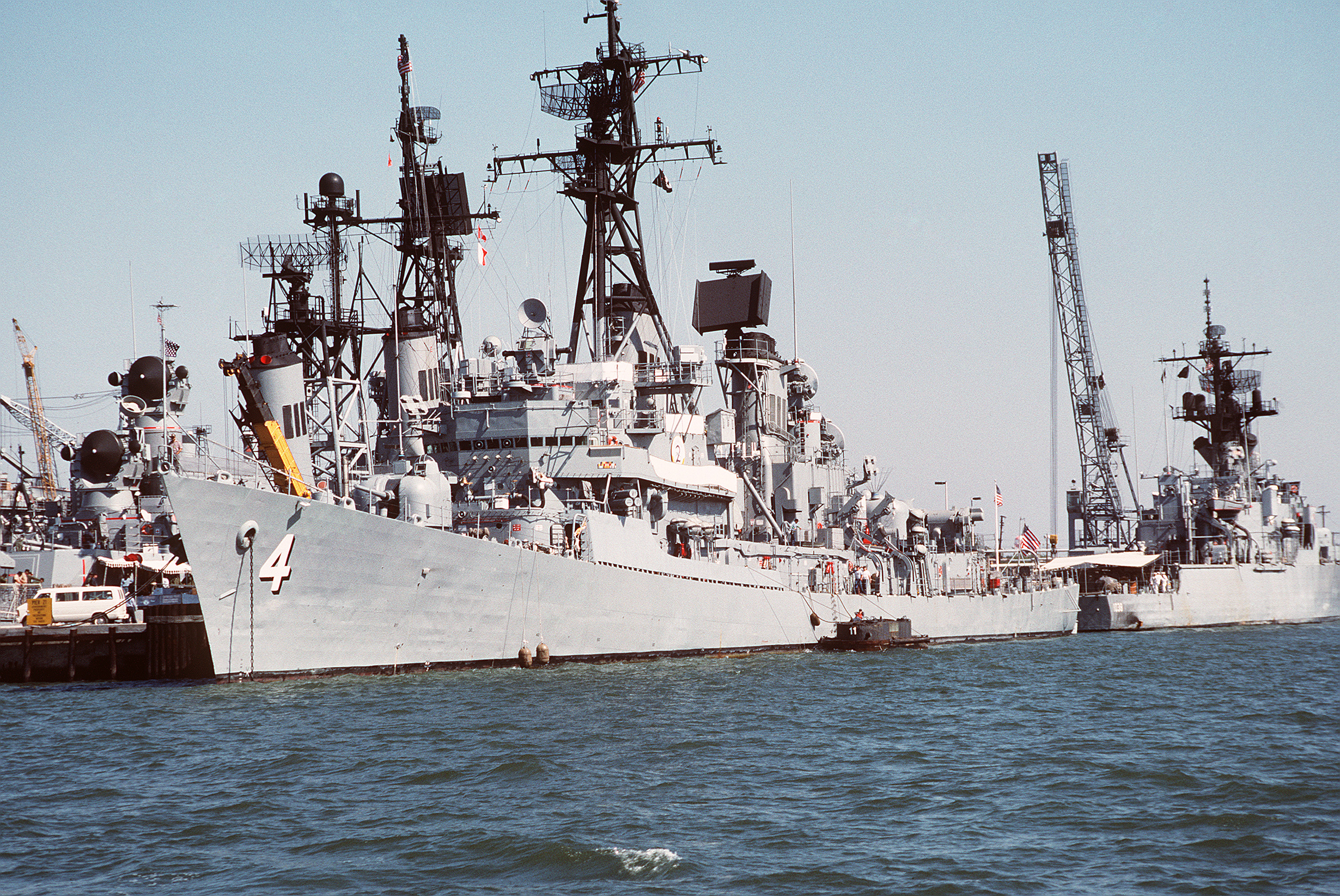
Lawrence and McCloy in Norfolk on 10 October 1988

==== Caribbean ====
USS Lawrence also saw frequent service closer to home, in the western Atlantic and Caribbean, and occasionally visited other waters. In 1986, she circumnavigated around South America as part of Operation Unitas XVII, exercising with Latin American navies and visiting ports in Puerto Rico, Panama, Venezuela, Colombia, Ecuador, Peru, Chile, Uruguay and Brazil. During that deployment, she served as the flagship for Destroyer Squadron 26.

=== Decommissioning ===
The USS Lawrence was decommissioned on 30 March 1990 and stricken from the Naval Vessel Register on 16 May 1990. The ship was sold for scrap on 15 April 1994. The Navy repossessed the ship in October 1996 after the ship breaking company failed, and it was finally resold for scrap on 10 February 1999.
