= Lauria (disambiguation) =

Lauria is an Italian town and comune of the province of Potenza, in Basilicata, situated near the borders of Calabria.

Lauria may also refer to:

- Francesco Lorenzo Brancati di Lauria (1612-1693), Italian cardinal and theologian
- Lauria (gastropod), a genus of land snail in the family Lauriidae. Species in that genus include:
  - Lauria cylindracea (Common chrysalis snail)
  - Lauria fanalensis
  - Lauria sempronii
- Lauria Nandangarh, a city/town in West Champaran district, Bihar state, northern India
- Roger of Lauria (c. 1245 – 1305), Sicilian admiral in Aragonese service

Lauria is a surname of Italian origin. People with that name include:

- Carmelo Lauría Lesseur (1936-2010), Venezuelan businessman, lawyer and politician
- Dan Lauria (born 1947), American television, stage, and film actor
- Fabio Lauria (born 1986), Italian footballer
- Lorenzo Lauria (born 1947), Italian international and world champion bridge player
- Matt Lauria (born 1982), American actor and musician
- Nando Lauria (born 1960), Brazilian musician
- Nicolás Lauría Calvo (born 1974), Argentine footballer
- Victoria Lauría, fictional character in the 2012 Argentine telenovela Graduados

== See also ==
- Italian ironclad Ruggiero di Lauria, a pre-dreadnought battleship built in the 1880s, named after Roger of Lauria
  - Ruggiero di Lauria-class ironclad
- Laura (disambiguation)
- Laurel (disambiguation)
- Lauri (disambiguation)
- Laurie (disambiguation)
