= Lori (surname) =

Lori is a surname. Notable persons of this name include the following:

- Chris Lori (born 1962), Canadian bobsled driver
- Gabriel Lory the Elder otherwise Gabriel Ludwig Lori (1763–1840), Swiss painter and illustrator
- Gabriel Lory the Younger otherwise Mathias Gabriel Lori (1784–1846), Swiss painter, etcher and illustrator
- Gino Lori (born 1956), Italian cyclist
- Johann Georg von Lori (1723–1787), Bavarian lawyer, official and historian
- Lisa Lori, American lawyer and university president
- William E. Lori (born 1951), American Catholic archbishop

== See also ==
- Laurie (surname)
- Loree
- Lorre
- Lorry (disambiguation)
- Lory (disambiguation)
