= Lauri =

Lauri may refer to:

- Lauri (given name), including a list of people with the name
- Lauri (surname), including a list of people with the name
- Lauri Ylönen, Finnish singer and lead vocalist of The Rasmus
- Lauri, Järva County, village in Türi Parish, Järva County, Estonia
- Lauri, Põlva County, village in Kanepi Parish, Põlva County, Estonia
- Lauri, Võru County, village in Rõuge Parish, Võru County, Estonia

== See also ==
- Lauria (disambiguation)
- Laurie (disambiguation)
- Lauris (given name)
- Laur (surname)
- Lorry
- Lurie
- Villa Lauri
