= Laurie (given name) =

Laurie is a unisex given name. Among males, it can be a short form (hypocorism) of Lawrence, Laurence or Laurens. For females, it can be a short form of Lauren or Laura.

Laurie is the name of:

== People ==
=== Women ===
- Laurie Allen, singer and musician, half of the Bobby & Laurie 1960s Australian singing duo
- Laurie Anderson (born 1947), American avant-garde artist, composer, musician and film director
- Laurie Halse Anderson (born 1961), American writer best known for children's and young adult novels
- Laurie Monnes Anderson (born 1945), American politician
- Laurie Baker (ice hockey) (born 1976), American hockey player
- Laurie Bolger (born 1989), English poet
- Laurie Brown (broadcaster) (born 1957), Canadian television host
- Laurie Butler (born 1955), American chemist
- Laurie Byrd, American basketball coach
- Laurie David (born 1958), American environmental activist
- Laurie Garrett (born 1951), American Pulitzer Prize-winning science journalist and writer
- Laurie Graham (skier) (born 1960), Canadian retired downhill skier, member of several Halls of Fame
- Laurie Graham (novelist) (born 1947), English journalist, scriptwriter and novelist
- Laurie Harding (born 1947), American politician
- Laurie Helgoe (born 1960), American clinical psychologist, educator
- Laurie Heyer, American mathematician
- Laurie Holden (born 1969), American actress
- Laurie Hill (footballer, born 1970), American-born Mexican international soccer player
- Laurie Jussaume (born 1999), Canadian cyclist
- Laurie King (born 1952), American author
- Laurie Marsden, American model, therapist, writer and activist
- Laurie Metcalf (born 1955), American actress
- Laurie Penny (born 1986), English feminist columnist and author
- Laurie Petrou, Canadian author
- Laurie Scott (politician) (born 1963), Canadian politician
- Laurie Gwen Shapiro (born 1966), American writer and filmmaker
- Laurie Sheck (born 1953), American poet, writer and academic
- Laurie Tackett (born 1974), one of the perpetrators of the torture-murder of Shanda Sharer
- Laurie Walker (artist) (1962–2011), Canadian artist
- Laurie Wayburn (born 1954), American conservationist
- Laurie Williams (wheelchair basketball) (born 1993), British wheelchair basketball player
- Laurie Schwab Zabin (1926–2020), American public health researcher and professor
- Laurie Zio, Australian politician

=== Men ===
- Laurie Allan (born 1943), English drummer
- Gerard Anderson (1889–1914), British hurdler
- Laurie Baker (1917–2007), British-born Indian architect
- Laurie Bell (footballer) (born 1992), English footballer
- Lawrence Bell (footballer) (1875–1933), Scottish footballer
- Laurie Boschman (born 1960), Canadian ice hockey player
- Laurie Brereton (born 1946), Australian politician
- Laurie Bristow (born 1963), British diplomat
- Laurie Brown (footballer) (1937–1998), British footballer and manager
- Laurie Brown (physicist) (1923–2019), American theoretical physicist
- Laurie Ferguson (born 1952), Australian former politician
- Laurie Hill (footballer, born 1942) (1942–2014), Australian rules footballer
- Laurie London (born 1944), English musician
- Laurie Lee (1914–1997), English poet, novelist and screenwriter
- Laurie Lynd (born 1959), Canadian screenwriter and director
- Laurie Scott (footballer) (1917–1999), English footballer
- Laurie Scott (ice hockey) (1896–1977), Canadian ice hockey player
- Laurie Spina (born 1963), Australian former rugby league footballer
- Laurie Taylor (disambiguation)
- Laurie Walker (footballer), (born 1989), English football goalkeeper
- Laurie Williams (cricketer) (1968–2002), West Indian cricketer

== Fictional characters ==
- Laurie Forman, in the TV show That 70s Show
- The title character of the TV series Laurie Hill
- Laurie Strode, in the Halloween film series, played by Jamie Lee Curtis
- Laurie Partridge, in the TV series The Partridge Family, played by Susan Dey
- Theodore Lawrence, called Laurie, in the novel Little Women
- Laurie, from the animated reality TV show The Ridonculous Race
- Laurie, later named Laurie du Salador, in Raymond E Feist 's The Riftwar Cycle
- Annie Laurie McShane, called Laurie in Betty Smith's novel A Tree Grows in Brooklyn

== See also ==
- J. Laurie Snell (1925–2011), American mathematician
- Lauri (given name)
- Lori (given name), feminine name
- Lorrie, feminine given name
- Laurey Williams, leading woman character in the musical Oklahoma!
