= Laurie =

Laurie may refer to:

== Places ==
- Laurie, Cantal, France, a commune
- Laurie, Missouri, United States, a village
- Laurie Island, Antarctica

== Music ==
- Laurie Records, a record label
- Laurie (EP), a 1992 album by Daniel Johnston
- "Laurie (Strange Things Happen)", a 1965 tragic ballad by Dickey Lee

== People and fictional characters ==
- Laurie (surname)
- Laurie (given name), a list of people and fictional characters

== Other uses ==
- Laurie baronets, three titles, one in the Baronetage of Nova Scotia and two in the Baronetage of the United Kingdom
- Tillandsia 'Laurie', a hybrid cultivar of Tillandsia schiedeana
- "Laurie" (short story), a 2018 short story by Stephen King

== See also ==
- Lawrie
- Lauri (disambiguation)
- Lauria (disambiguation)
- Lori
- Lorrie
- Lourie
- Lurie
- Lorry
