= Lorrie =

Lorrie is a usually feminine name which may refer to:

== Given name or shortened name ==
- Lorrie Collins (1942–2018), American country music, rockabilly and rock-and-roll singer
- Lorrie Cranor, American professor and director of the Carnegie Mellon University Usable Privacy and Security Laboratory
- Lorrie Dunington-Grubb (1877–1945), English landscape architect in Canada
- Lorrie Fair (born 1978), American soccer player
- Lorrie Lynch, journalist and senior editor of USA Weekend magazine through 2009
- Lorrie Menconi, Playboy Playmate of the month for February 1969
- Lorrie Moore (born 1957), American fiction writer
- Lorrie Morgan (born 1959), American country music singer
- Lorrie Otto (1919–2010), American environmentalist and author
- Lorrie Pickering (1919–2009), New Zealand politician, Minister of Education in 1972
- Lorrie Sprecher (born 1960), American writer and musician
- Lorrie Wilmot (1943–2004), South African cricketer

== Pseudonym or nickname ==
- Irène Hamoir, Belgian author and surrealist referred to as "Lorrie" in the writings of her husband, Louis Scutenaire, and also in the works of René Magritte

== See also ==
- Laurie (disambiguation)
- Lori (disambiguation)
- Lorie (disambiguation)
- Lorri (disambiguation)
- Lorry (disambiguation)
- Lory (disambiguation)
