= Lorri =

Lorri may refer to:

== Acronym ==
- LORRI, the Long Range Reconnaissance Imager, a camera on board the New Horizons spacecraft

== Given name ==
- Lorri Bagley, an American actress and model
- Lorri Bauman, American former basketball player
- Lorri Jean, a leader in the gay, lesbian, bisexual and transgender ("GLBT") civil rights movement in America

== See also ==
- Lory (disambiguation)
- Lorry (disambiguation)
- Lori (disambiguation)
