= Lori =

Lori may refer to:

- Lori (given name)
- Lori (surname)
- Lori Province, Armenia
  - Lori (cheese) originating from the above province
- Lori Fortress, a fortress in Armenia
- Lori Berd, a village in Armenia
- Kingdom of Tashir-Dzoraget, a historical Armenian kingdom from c. 980 to 1240, sometimes known as the Kingdom of Lori
- Lori people, a nomadic community found in Balochistan region of Pakistan and Iran
- Luri language (or Lori language), spoken by the Lur people Lorestān, Iran
- Hesperornithoides, a dinosaur whose type specimen was nicknamed "Lori" until it was described in 2019
- Lori, Grand'Anse, a village in the Jérémie commune of Haiti
- Lori Vanadzor, defunct football club from Vanadzor
- Lori FC, football club from Vanadzor founded in 2017
- Aircraft name of National Airlines Flight 102
- 2022 EP by Iron & Wine

== See also ==
- Laurie (disambiguation)
- Lory (disambiguation)
- Lorry (disambiguation)
- Loris (disambiguation)
- Lodi (disambiguation)
- Loris, any of several small strepsirrhine primates, of the family Lorisidae, found in India and southeast Asia
