= Lauri (surname) =

Family name

Lauri is a surname. Notable people with the surname include:

- Bernardo Lauri (died 1516), Italian bishop
- Carl Lauri (1924–1990), American politician
- Filippo Lauri (1623–1694), Italian painter
- Francesco Lauri (1610–1635), Italian painter
- Giacomo Lauri (1623–1694), Italian engraver
- Giacomo Lauri-Volpi (1892–1979), Italian tenor
- Giuseppe Lauri (born 1976), Italian boxer
- Guido Lauri (1922–2019), Italian dancer
- Hannele Lauri (born 1952), Finnish actress
- Hannu Lauri (born 1945), Finnish actor
- Heinrich Lauri (1890–1942), Estonian politician
- Kjell Lauri (1956–2023), Swedish orienteer
- Lorenzo Lauri (1864–1941), Italian cardinal
- Maris Lauri (born 1966), Estonian politician
- Miguel Ángel Lauri (1908–1994), Argentine footballer
- Mike Lauri, American musician
- Pietro Lauri, French painter
- Steve Lauri (born 1954), British singer and guitarist
- Tiziana Lauri (born 1959), Italian ballerina

== See also ==
- Lauri (given name)
- Lauri (disambiguation)
- Laurie (surname)
