= Luria (disambiguation) =

Luria is a surname, a variant of Lurie.

Luria may also refer to:

- Luria (gastropod), a genus of sea snail
- Luria gens, an ancient Roman family
- Luria (play), a play by Robert Browning, published in 1846
