= Washington Savoyards =

Musical theatre company

Washington Savoyards was a professional musical theatre company based in Washington, D.C. Founded in 1972, the company annually produced three fully staged musicals and operettas, usually including at least one Gilbert and Sullivan production each year. It performed at the Duke Ellington School and the Atlas Performing Arts Center. The company discontinued performances by 2013.

== Description of the company ==
The company was formed in 1972 as the Montgomery Savoyards but changed its name in 1981, since its performers, musicians and patrons were drawn from all over the Washington, D.C. metropolitan area. For its first three decades, the company performed primarily the operas of Gilbert and Sullivan. It began performing in church halls and Montgomery Blair High School. In 1982, it moved to the Trinity Theatre in Georgetown, Washington. In 1987, it transferred to the Duke Ellington Theatre at the Duke Ellington School for the Arts, also in Georgetown, which served as its home for ten years.

The first non-Gilbert and Sullivan piece produced by the company was Jacques Offenbach's La Périchole, during the 2004–2005 season. The following season was the first with three productions, and in most seasons after that it produced at least three shows. The company cast the first of many members of Actors Equity in 2006. In late 2006, the company moved to its new home, the Atlas Performing Arts Center in Northeast Washington. The company also performed at the H Street Festival, Kennedy Center's Millennium Stage, and at the Arts Club of Washington, among other venues.

Washington Savoyards attracted its singers from among opera and theatre professionals based in the Washington area, as well as music, theatre, and opera students from local universities. In 2004, the company was accepted into residency at Flashpoint, Washington's arts incubator run by the Cultural Development Corporation of Washington. The company's artistic director, from 2007 to 2012, was N. Thomas Pedersen. Audrey M. Shipp directed all of the Savoyards' productions from 1973 until 1995.

The company received support from charitable foundations, such as the Fund for Maryland's Future, the Sprenger-Lang Foundation, MARPAT Foundation, the Meyer Foundation, the Morris & Gwendolyn Cafritz Foundation and individual donors, as well as from ticket sales and program advertising. The company's name was a reference to the Savoy Theatre in London, where the Gilbert and Sullivan operas were originally presented in the 1880s and 1890s by the D'Oyly Carte Opera Company and to aficionados and performers of the Savoy operas. In 1986, Supreme Court Justice William Rehnquist (later Chief Justice of the United States) appeared with the Washington Savoyards to play the Solicitor in its production of Gilbert and Sullivan's Patience.

== Later seasons ==
In its later seasons, the company performed such works as Ain't Misbehavin', Kiss Me, Kate, The Merry Widow and Man of La Mancha, as well as Gilbert and Sullivan operas. Sandy Bainum brought the company its first Helen Hayes Award nomination for her role as Marian Paroo in the 2009 production of The Music Man. During the 2009–2010 season, the Company sponsored its first educational program.

In February 2012, the company held a 40th anniversary gala, celebrating Gilbert and Sullivan and their legacy to American musical theatre. During the 2012 spring season, Washington Savoyards performed Rodgers & Hammerstein's A Grand Night for Singing and, as a Halloween production, The Rocky Horror Show.

The company's last activity was a staged reading of the musical Delilah in January 2013.
