= Lori (given name) =

Lori is a female given name, a variant of Laura and Lorraine.

== People ==
- Lori Alan (born 1966), American voice actress
- Lori Alhadeff (born 1975), American activist
- Lori Balmer (born 1958), Australian singer
- Lori Barth, American songwriter
- Lori Berenson (born 1969), American activist
- Lori Mann Bruce, American academic
- Lori Cardille (born 1954), American actress
- Lori Chavez-DeRemer (born 1968), American politician and businesswoman
- Lori Dittman, American politician
- Lori Douglas, Canadian judge
- Lori Dupuis (born 1972), Canadian ice hockey player
- Lori Ehrlich (born 1963), American politician
- Lori Foster, American romance novelist
- Lori Goldstein, American fashion designer
- Lori Stewart Gonzalez (born 1957), American speech pathologist and academic administrator
- Lori Greiner, American entrepreneur and television personality
- Lori Harfenist, American internet and media personality, also known as The Resident
- Lori Harvey, American model, entrepreneur, and socialite
- Lori Hoey, England women's international footballer
- Lori Lewis (born 1972), American singer
- Lori Lieberman, American singer-songwriter
- Lori Lightfoot, American politician
- Lori Lively, American actress
- Lori Loughlin (born 1964), American actress
- Lori Majewski, American entertainment writer
- Lori McKenna, American singer and songwriter
- Lori Meyer, American softball coach
- Lori Petty, American actress
- Lori Piestewa, American soldier
- Lori Roach (born 1970), Bahamian road racing cyclist
- Lori Rook, American politician
- Lori Singer, American actress
- Lori Trahan (born 1973), American politician
- Lori Voornas (born 1965), American radio personality
- Lori Wilson (Florida politician), American politician and lawyer

== Fictional characters ==
- Lori, a character in the 2012 remake of Total Recall, played by Kate Beckinsale
- Lori Collins, a character in the 2012 film, Ted, played by Mila Kunis
- Lori Grimes, a character in the comic and TV series The Walking Dead, played by Sarah Wayne Callies
- Lori Quaid, a character in the 1990 film Total Recall, played by Sharon Stone
- Lori Weston, a character in the TV series Hawaii Five-0, played by Lauren German
- Lori Loud, in the TV series The Loud House
- Lori Carmichael, a character in Mary Stanton's Unicorns of Balinor book series
- Lori Milligan, a character in the film, The Final Destination
- Lori Nguyen, a character in the book TEN by Gretchen McNeil and the 2017 film adaptation Ten: Murder Island played by Raquel Castro
- Lori Jiménez, a child character in the anime series, Transformers: Cybertron

== See also ==
- Lorrie, given name
- Laurie, given name
- Lola, given name
- Lyra, given name
