= Luria =

Luria is a surname, a variant of Lurie. Notable people with the surname include:

- Alexander Luria (1902–1977), Russian neuropsychologist
- Elaine Luria (born 1975), United States Navy Commander and politician
- Gina Luria Walker, American professor of women's studies
- Isaac Luria (1534–1572), Jewish mystic from Safed
- Itzhak Luria (swimmer) (born 1940), Israeli swimmer
- Johanan Luria (c. 1445–1511), Alsatian Talmudist
- Juan Luria (1862–1943), Polish-Jewish operatic baritone
- Miriam Shapira-Luria, Talmudic scholar of the Late Middle Ages
- Roger de Luria (c. 1245–1305), Sicilian/Aragonese admiral
- Salvador Luria (1912–1991), Italian microbiologist
- Solomon Luria (1510–1573), Ashkenazic rabbi
- Zella Luria (1924–2018), American psychologist and feminist
