= H Street =

H Street or "H" Street is the eighth of a sequence of alphabetical streets in many cities.

It may refer to:

- H Street (Washington, D.C.)
  - H Street/Benning Road Line, streetcar line in Washington, D.C.
  - H Street Festival, yearly festival in Washington, D.C.
  - H Street Playhouse, theatre and gallery in Washington, D.C.
- H Street station, trolley car station in San Diego, California
- H-Street, skateboarding company associated with Tony Magnusson
