= Loree =

Loree or Lorée may refer to:

== People ==
=== As a surname ===
- Anne Loree, Canadian songwriter
- Brad Loree, Canadian actor and stuntman
- James M. Loree, American business executive
- Leonor F. Loree, American railroad executive

=== As a given name ===
- Richard Loree Anderson, American econometrician
- LoreeJon Hasson, American billiard player
- Loree Marlowe Moore, American basketball player
- Loree Murray, American activist
- Loree Rackstraw, American critic and memoirist
- Loree Rodkin, American jewelry designer
- Loree Smith, American hammer thrower
- Loree K. Sutton, American general and politician

== Places ==
- Loree, Alabama
- Loree, Indiana

== Companies ==
- F. Lorée, a French musical-instrument manufacturer

== Film ==
- Leo and Loree (1980)

== See also ==
- Laurie (disambiguation)
- Lawry
- Lorre (disambiguation)
- Lowery
- Lowry (disambiguation)
