= Lauris (given name) =

Unisex given name

- Gender: Unisex
- Name day: 27 November (Latvia)

Origin
- Region of origin: Latvia (masculine); English-speaking regions (masculine and feminine)

Other names
- Related names: Lauri

Lauris is a given name. In Latvia, it is exclusively a masculine name. In other regions, it can be both a masculine and feminine given name. Individuals bearing the name Lauris include:

== Masculine ==
- Lauris Bajaruns (born 1989), Latvian ice hockey player
- Lauris Dārziņš (born 1985), Latvian ice hockey forward
- Lauris Norstad (1907–1988), American United States Army Air Forces and United States Air Force General
- Lauris Reiniks (born 1979), Latvian pop music singer, songwriter, television host, and actor
- Lauris Strautmanis (born 1995), Latvian sport shooter

== Feminine ==
- Lauris Edmond (1924–2000), New Zealand poet and writer
- Lauris Elms (born 1931), Australian opera and lied contralto

== See also ==
- Lauri (disambiguation)
