= Johanan Luria =

Personal life
- Born: c. 1445 Landau
- Died: 1511 Worms
- Children: Aaron; Rivka
- Parents: Aaron Luria (father); Miriam Shapira-Luria (mother)
- Relatives: Rashi, Miriam bat Rashi, Judah ben Nathan

Religious life
- Religion: Judaism

Johanan ben Aaron ben Nathanael Luria (Hebrew: יוחנן בן אהרן בן נתנאל לוריא) was an Alsatian Talmudist. He lived successively at Niedernheim and Strasburg at the end of the fifteenth century and in the beginning of the sixteenth. After having studied for many years in German yeshivot, he returned to Alsace and settled in Strasburg, where he founded a yeshiva by permission of the government. Luria was the author of an ethical work entitled "Hadrakah" (Kraków, c. 1579) and of "Meshibat Nefesh" (Neubauer, "Catalogue of the Hebrew MSS. in the Bodleian Library" No. 257), an aggadic and mystical commentary on the Pentateuch, founded on Rashi. To this commentary was appended a dissertation in which Luria refuted the arguments advanced by Christians against Judaism.

His father, Aaron ben Nathanael Luria, is often cited as the first Luria and the progenitor of this family. One of his descendants was Elijah Loans.

Johanan had two brothers, Yechiel Yehuda and Judah "the physician". Yechiel Yehuda had four children, including Dreizel Miriam Zeisel Luria (Rema's grandmother) and Julia-Malka Luria (Meir Katzenellenbogen's mother).

== Ancestry ==
Ancestors of Johanan Luria

Shimshon
Yechiel Yehuda
Miriam bat Shlomo Spira
Nethanel
Matityahu III Ashkenazi Treves
Daughter of Matityahu
Marianne Treves Spira
Aharon Luria
Johanan Luria
Samuel Zalman Spira
Sholmo Salman Spira
Matityahu III Ashkenazi Treves
Julia Minna Vergentlin Treves
Marianne Treves Spira
Miriam Spira
Matityahu III Ashkenazi Treves
Yosef V Tzarfati-Treves
Vergentlin Hanna Treves
Marianne Treves Spira
