= Lori Berd Hydro Power Plant =

- Country: Armenia
- Location: Lori Berd
- Coordinates: 41°00′32″N 44°24′36″E
- Status: Proposed

Thermal power station
- Primary fuel: Hydropower

Power generation
- Nameplate capacity: 60 MW (80,000 hp)

The Lori Berd Hydro Power Plant is a proposed hydroelectric power plant in the village of Lori Berd in Armenia's northern province of Lori along the Dzoraget River. It should have an installed electric capacity of 60 megawatts (80,000 hp).

== See also ==
- Energy in Armenia
