= Loris (disambiguation) =

Loris is the common name for the strepsirrhine mammals of the subfamily Lorinae.

Loris may also refer to:

== Mammals ==
- Slender loris, a genus comprising two species;
  1. Red slender loris
  2. Gray slender loris
- Slow lorises, in the genus Nycticebus
- Pygmy slow loris, in the genus Xanthonycticebus

== Places ==
- Loris, South Carolina, a city in South Carolina

== People ==
- Hugo von Hofmannsthal (1874–1929), writer, early pen name Loris
- Loris Abate (1928–2020), Italian jewelry designer and businessman
- Loris Azzaro (1933–2003), French-Italian fashion designer
- Loris Baz (born 1993), French motorcycle racer
- Loris Benito (born 1992), Swiss footballer
- Loris Campana (1926–2015), Italian road bicycle and track cyclist
- Loris Capirossi (born 1973), Italian Grand Prix motorcycle road racer
- Loris Francesco Capovilla (1915–2016), Italian Roman Catholic prelate and cardinal
- Loris (drag queen), Swiss drag performer
- Loris Facci (born 1983), Italian swimmer
- Loris Fortuna (1924–1985), Italian politician
- Loris Guernieri (1937–2003), Italian racing cyclist
- Loris Karius (born 1993), German footballer
- Loris Kessel (1950–2010), Swiss racing driver
- Loris Reggiani (born 1959), Italian motorcycle racer
- Loris Stecca (born 1960), Italian world champion boxer
- Loris Tjeknavorian (born 1937), Iranian-Armenian composer and conductor

== See also ==
- Lory (disambiguation)
- Lorry (disambiguation)
- Lori (disambiguation)
- Hugo Lloris (born 1986), French footballer
