= Lauri, Võru County =

Village in Estonia

Lauri
- Village
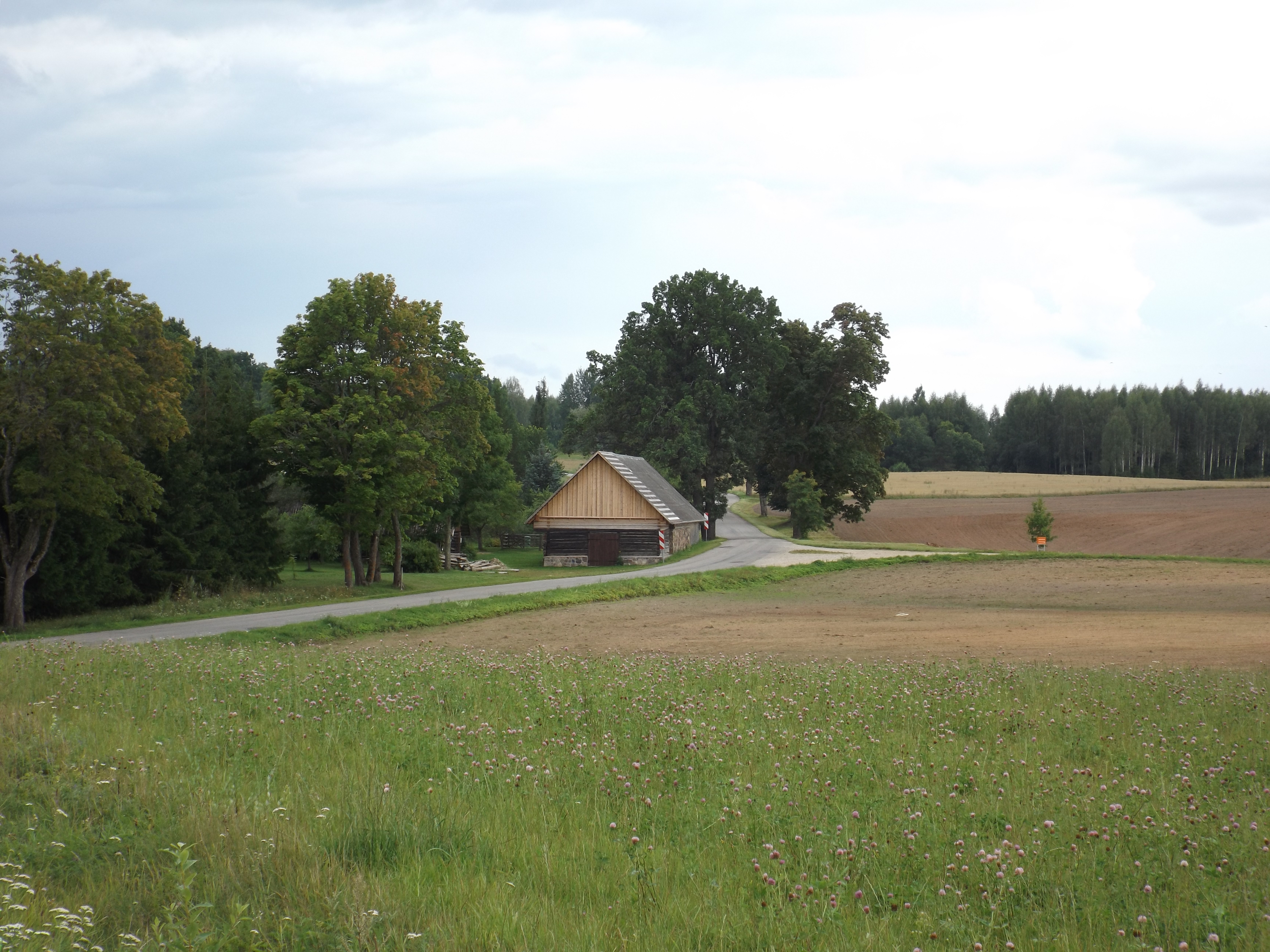
- Nursi-Rõuge road through Lauri

- Location within Estonia
- Coordinates: 57.755°N 26.873888888889°E
- Country: Estonia
- County: Võru County
- Parish: Rõuge Parish
- Time zone: UTC+2 (EET)
  - Summer (DST): UTC+3 (EEST)

Lauri is a village in Rõuge Parish, Võru County in Estonia.
