= Lauri (given name) =

- Gender: Male
- Name day: 10 August (both Estonia and Finland)

Origin
- Origin: Estonian, Finnish
- Region of origin: Estonia, Finland

Lauri is an Estonian and Finnish male given name. It can also be a surname.

It may refer to the following people:

== Actors ==
- Lauri Lagle (born 1981), Estonian actor, director and screenwriter
- Lauri Nebel (born 1948), Estonian actor and magician
- Lauri Pedaja (born 1987), Estonian actor
- Lauri Tilkanen (born 1987), Finnish actor

== Business ==
- Lauri Kivekäs (1903–1998), Finnish businessman (Nokia)
- Lauri Rapala (1905–1974), Finnish businessman (Rapala fishing lures)

== Film and videomakers ==
- Lauri Harjola (also known as Renny Harlin) (born 1959), Finnish film director
- Lauri Törhönen (born 1947), Finnish film director
- Lauri Vuohensilta (born 1986/87), Finnish machinist best known as the creator of YouTube's Hydraulic Press Channel

== Literature ==
- Lauri Hussar (born 1973), Estonian journalist
- Lauri Pilter (born 1971), Estonian writer, translator and literary scientist
- Lauri Soininen (1875–1919), Finnish poet and journalist
- Lauri Sommer (born 1973), Estonian writer and musician
- Lauri Viita (1916–1965), Finnish poet
- Lauri Viljanen (1900–1994), Finnish literary critic and writer

== Military ==
- Lauri Heino (1918–2001), Finnish Army Sergeant of World War II
- Lauri Malmberg (1888–1948), Finnish Army General
- Lauri Nissinen (1918–1944) Finnish World War II flying ace
- Lauri Pekuri (1916-1999), Finnish aviator, World War II flying ace, jet aircraft pioneer
- Lauri Sutela (1918–2011), Finnish military officer
- Lauri Tiainen (1891–1958), Finnish Army Colonel
- Lauri Törni (1919–1965), Finnish Army captain, served in the Waffen SS and United States Army

== Musicians ==
- Lauri Jõeleht (born 1974), Estonian composer
- Lauri Markkula (member of Negative (Finnish band))
- Lauri Õunapuu (born 1976), Estonian musician (Metsatöll)
- Lauri Penttilä (born 1979), also known as Werwolf, Finnish musician (Satanic Warmaster)
- Lauri Pihlap (born 1982), Estonian singer
- Lauri Porra (born 1977), Finnish bassist (Stratovarius)
- Lauri Sirp (born 1969), Estonian conductor
- Lauri Tähkä (born 1973), Finnish musician (Lauri Tähkä & Elonkerjuu)
- Lauri Ylönen (born 1979), Finnish singer, musician (The Rasmus)

== Politicians ==
- Lauri Einer (born 1931), Estonian politician
- Lauri Heikkilä (born 1957), Finnish parliamentarian
- Lauri Ihalainen (born 1947), Finnish trade union leader and politician
- Lauri Ingman (1868–1934), Prime Minister of Finland 1918–1919 and 1924–1925, Archbishop of Finland 1930–1934
- Lauri Läänemets (born 1983), Estonian politician
- Lauri Laasi (born 1974), Estonian politician
- Lauri Laats (born 1981), Estonian politician and entrepreneur
- Lauri Lepik (born 1960), Estonian diplomat and civil servant
- Lauri Letonmäki (1886–1935), Finnish communist politician
- Lauri Luik (born 1982), Estonian politician
- Lauri Kristian Relander (1883–1942), President of Finland 1925-1931
- Lauri Vahtre (born 1960), Estonian politician, historian, translator and writer

== Science and education ==
- Lauri Hakulinen (1899–1985), Finnish linguist and educator
- Lauri Honko (1932–2002), Finnish religious academic, folklorist and educator
- Lauri Kaila, Finnish entomologist and researcher of biodiversity
- Lauri Karttunen (1941–2022), Finnish linguist
- Lauri Kettunen (1885–1963), Finnish linguist
- Lauri Leesi (born 1945), Estonian educator and translator
- Lauri Mälksoo (born 1975), Estonian legal scholar
- Lauri Vaska (1925–2015), Estonian chemist

== Sportsmen ==
Athletics

- Lauri Halonen (1894–1961), Finnish track and field athlete and Olympic competitor
- Lauri Härö (1899–1980), Finnish sprinter, track and field athlete and Olympic competitor
- Lauri Kettunen (1905–1941), Finnish fencer, modern pentathlete, and Olympic competitor
- Lauri Kyöstilä (1896–1984), Finnish diver and Olympic competitor
- Lauri Lehtinen (1908–1973), Finnish track and field athlete and Olympic medalist
- Lauri Leis (born 1978), Estonian triple jumper and Olympic competitor
- Lauri Lelumees (born 1978), Estonian race walker
- Lauri Nevalainen (1927– 2005), Finnish rower and Olympic medalist
- Lauri Pihkala (1888–1981), Finnish inventor of pesäpallo, track and field athlete, Olympic competitor
- Lauri Sild (born 1990), Estonian orienteer
- Lauri Tanner (1890–1950), Finnish gymnast, football player and Olympic medalist
- Lauri Vilkko (1925–2017), Finnish modern pentathlete and Olympic medalist
- Lauri Virtanen (1904–1982), Finnish long-distance runner, track and field athlete, Olympic medalist

Basketball

- Lauri Markkanen (born 1997), Finnish basketball player in the NBA

Cycling

- Lauri Aus (1970–2003), Estonian cyclist and Olympic competitor
- Lauri Resik (born 1969), Estonian cyclist and Olympic competitor

Ice hockey

- Lauri Kärmeniemi (born 1991), Finnish player for HPK
- Lauri Korpikoski, (born 1986), Finnish player for the Phoenix Coyotes
- Lauri Lahesalu (born 1979), Estonian player for Dragons de Rouen
- Lauri Mononen (1950–2018), Finnish winger
- Lauri Taipalus (born 1988), Finnish player for JYP Jyvaskyla
- Lauri Tukonen (born 1986), Finnish player for Lukko and the Los Angeles Kings

Football

- Lauri Dalla Valle (born 1991), Finnish striker for Sint-Truidense VV
- Lauri Laine (born 2005), Finnish winger for SJK Seinäjoki
- Lauri Pirhonen (born 1984), Finnish goalkeeper for FC Jazz
- Lauri Sahimaa (born 2005), Finnish midfielder for KuPS
- Lauri Vetri (born 2003), Finnish goalkeeper for SalPa

Skiing

- Lauri Asikainen (born 1989), Finnish Nordic combined athlete
- Lauri Hakola (born 1979), Finnish ski jumper
- Lauri Pyykönen (born 1978), Finnish cross-country skier and Olympic competitor
- Lauri Silvennoinen (1916–2004), Finnish cross-country skier and Olympic medalist
- Lauri Valonen (1909–1982), Finnish Nordic combined skier, Olympic competitor

Wrestling and Olympic competitor

- Lauri Koskela (1907–1944), Finnish Greco-Roman wrestler and Olympic medalist

== See also ==
- Lauri (surname)
- Laurie (given name)
