= Lauria fanalensis =

Conservation status
- Least Concern (IUCN 3.1)

Scientific classification
- Kingdom: Animalia
- Phylum: Mollusca
- Class: Gastropoda
- Order: Stylommatophora
- Family: Lauriidae
- Genus: Lauria
- Species: L. fanalensis

Binomial name
- Lauria fanalensis (Lowe, 1852)

Species of gastropod

Lauria fanalensis is a species of land snail in the family Lauriidae. It is native to Madeira and the Canary Islands (El Hierro, La Palma, La Gomera and Tenerife).

This snail occurs in laurisilva habitat, where it lives in moss and lichen on the trunks of laurel trees. There are no immediate threats to the species though there is an extinction threat since 2011.
