= Lori Berd =

Lori Berd Լոռի բերդ
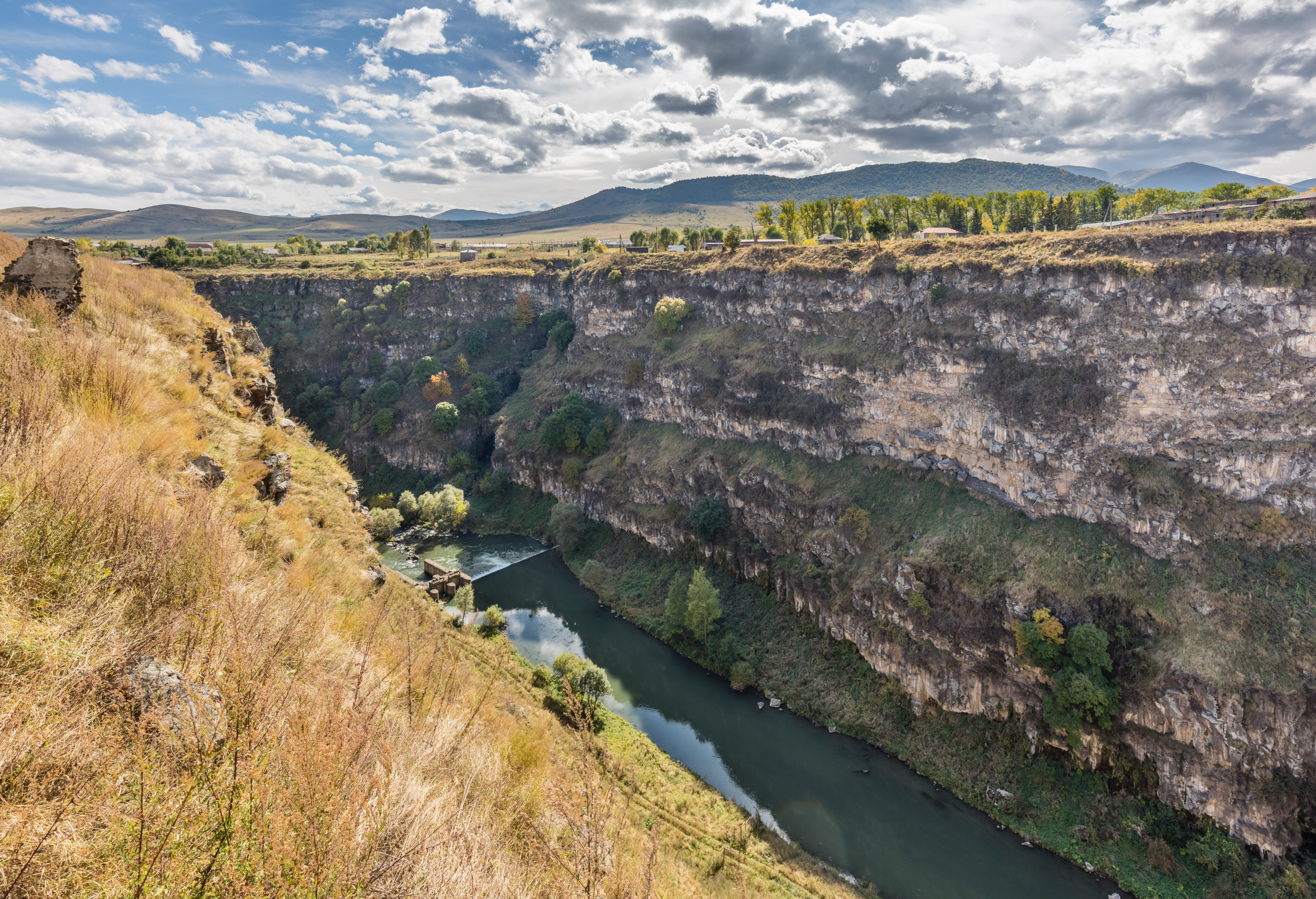

- Location within Armenia
- Coordinates: 41°0′46″N 44°24′45″E
- Country: Armenia
- Province: Lori
- Elevation: 1,379 m (4,524 ft)

Population (2011)
  - Total: 405
- Time zone: UTC+4 (AMT)

Lori Berd (Armenian: Լոռի բերդ) is a village in the Lori Province of Armenia, just east of Stepanavan.

The medieval fortress "Lori Berd" is located near the village, situated on a peninsula along the deep gorge cut by the Dzoraget and Tashir rivers. Lori Berd is situated at an elevation of 1379 m.

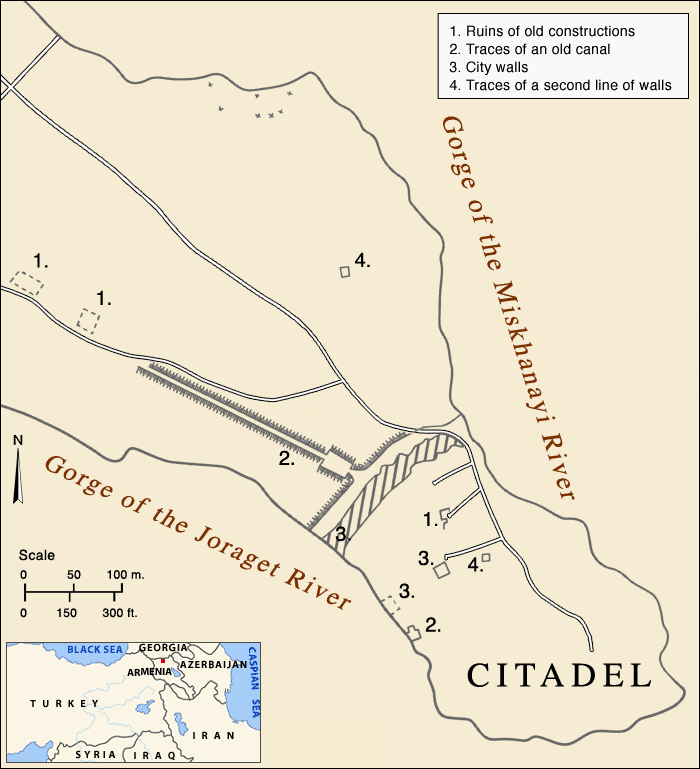
Plan of Lori berd.

== Gallery ==
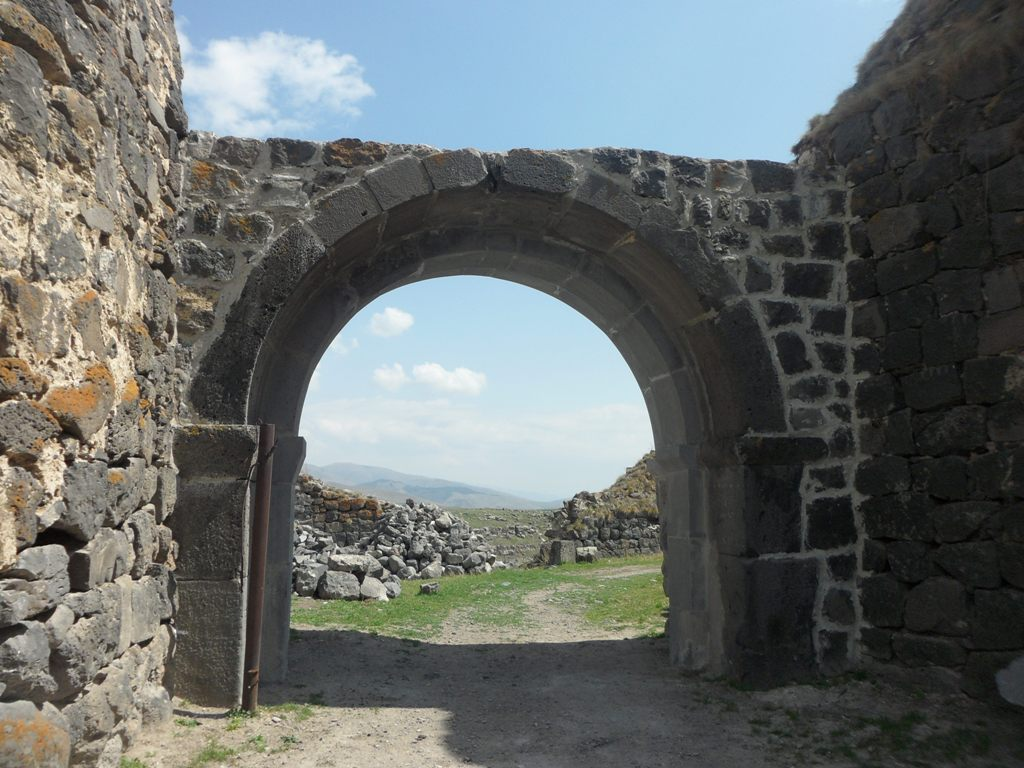

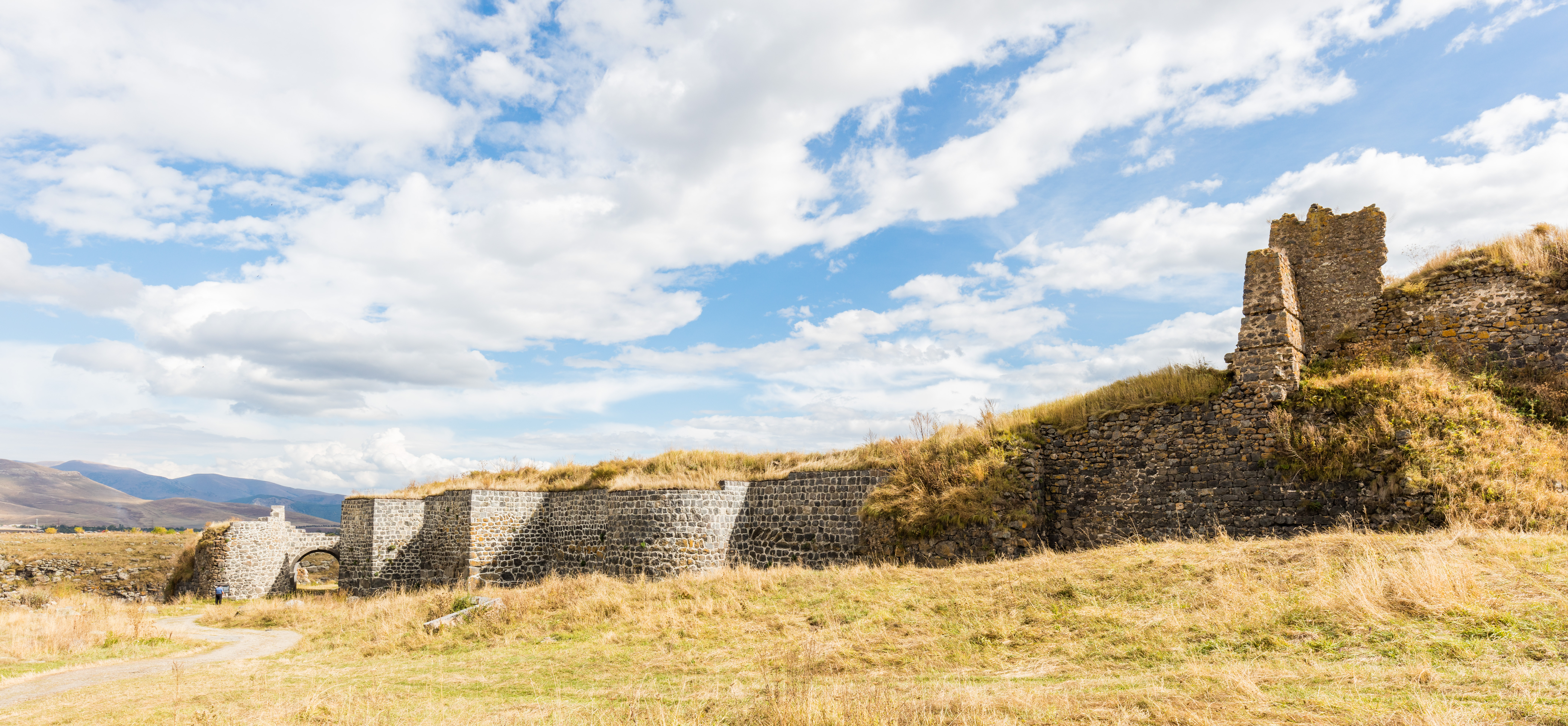

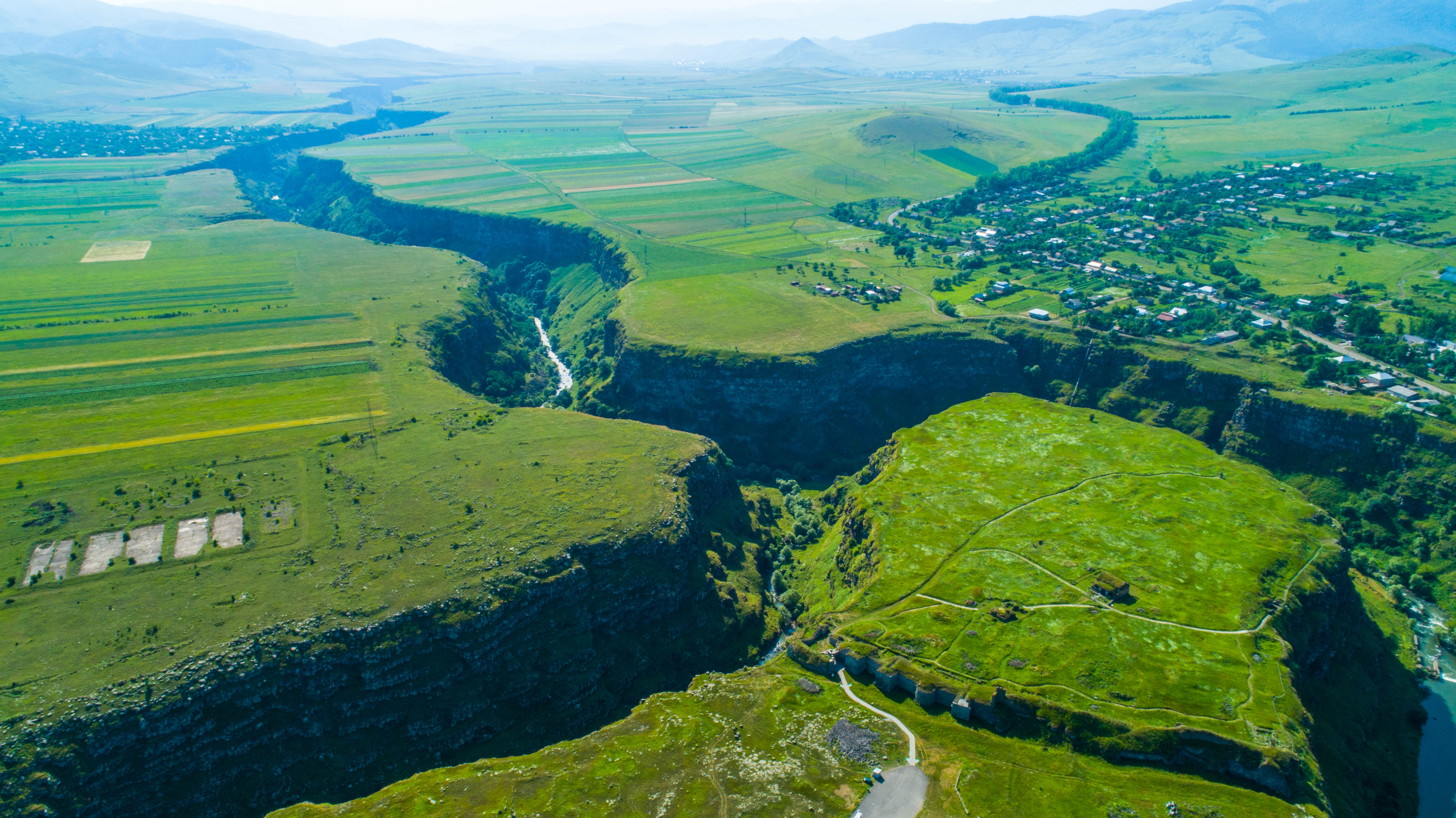

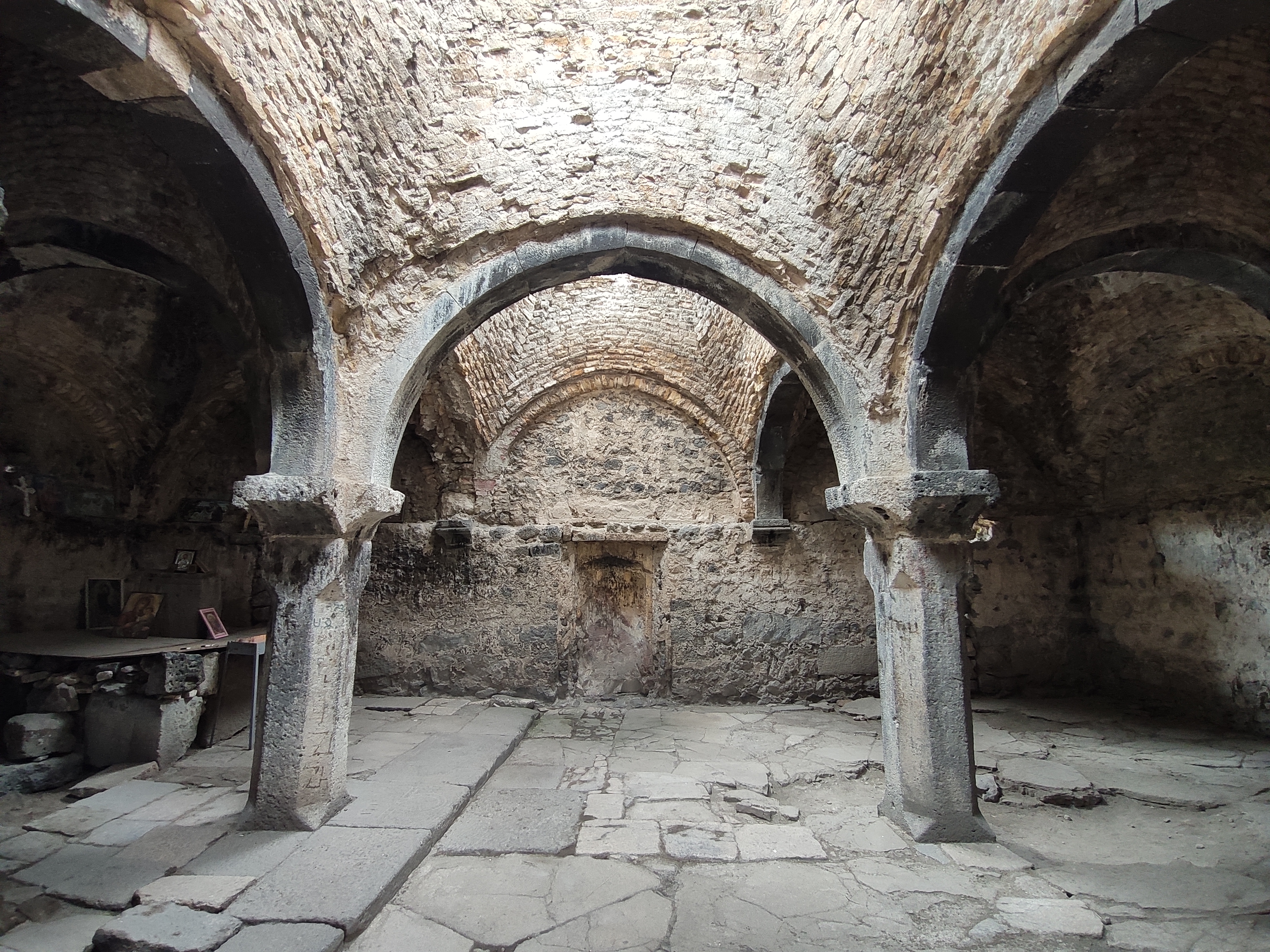

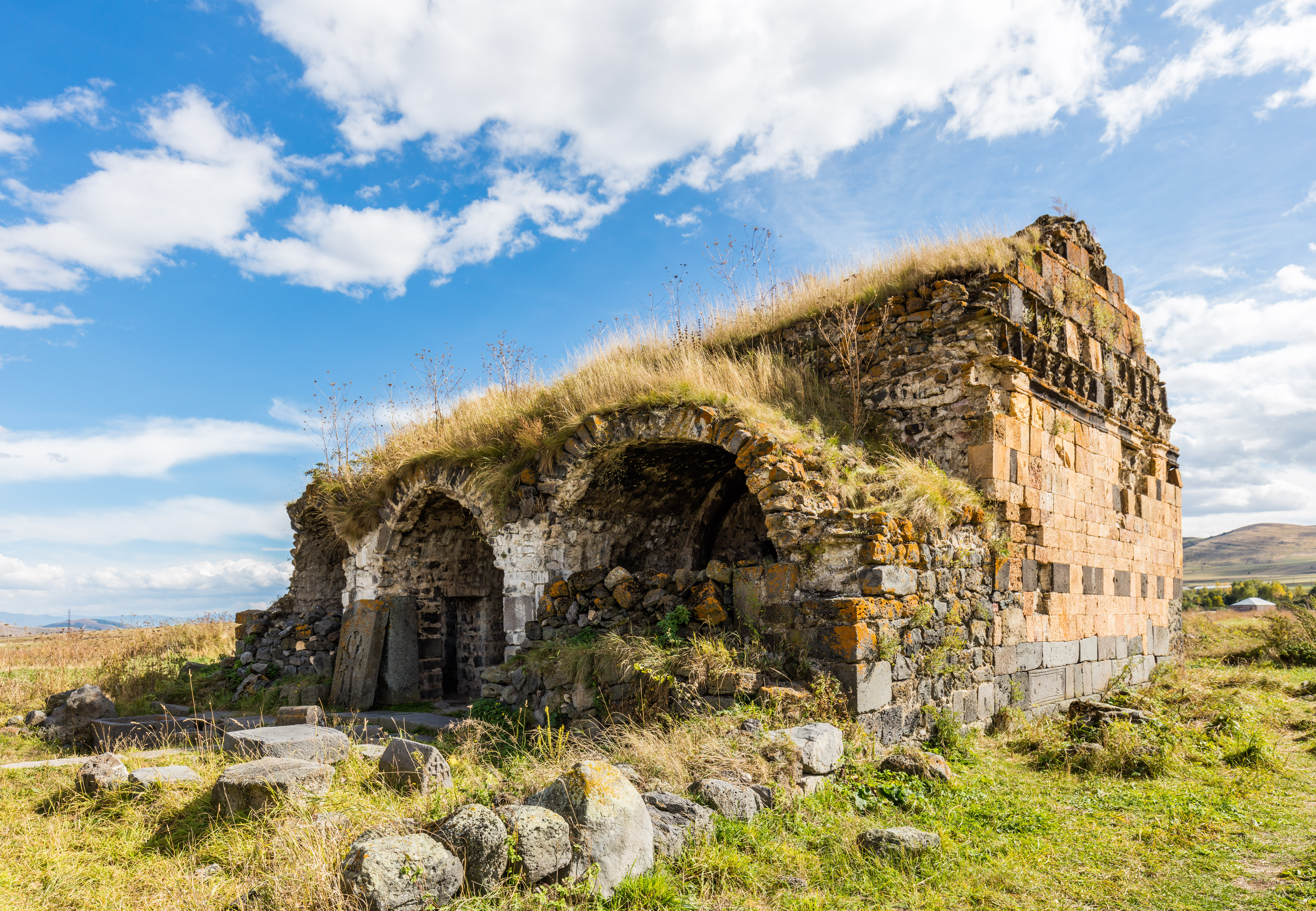

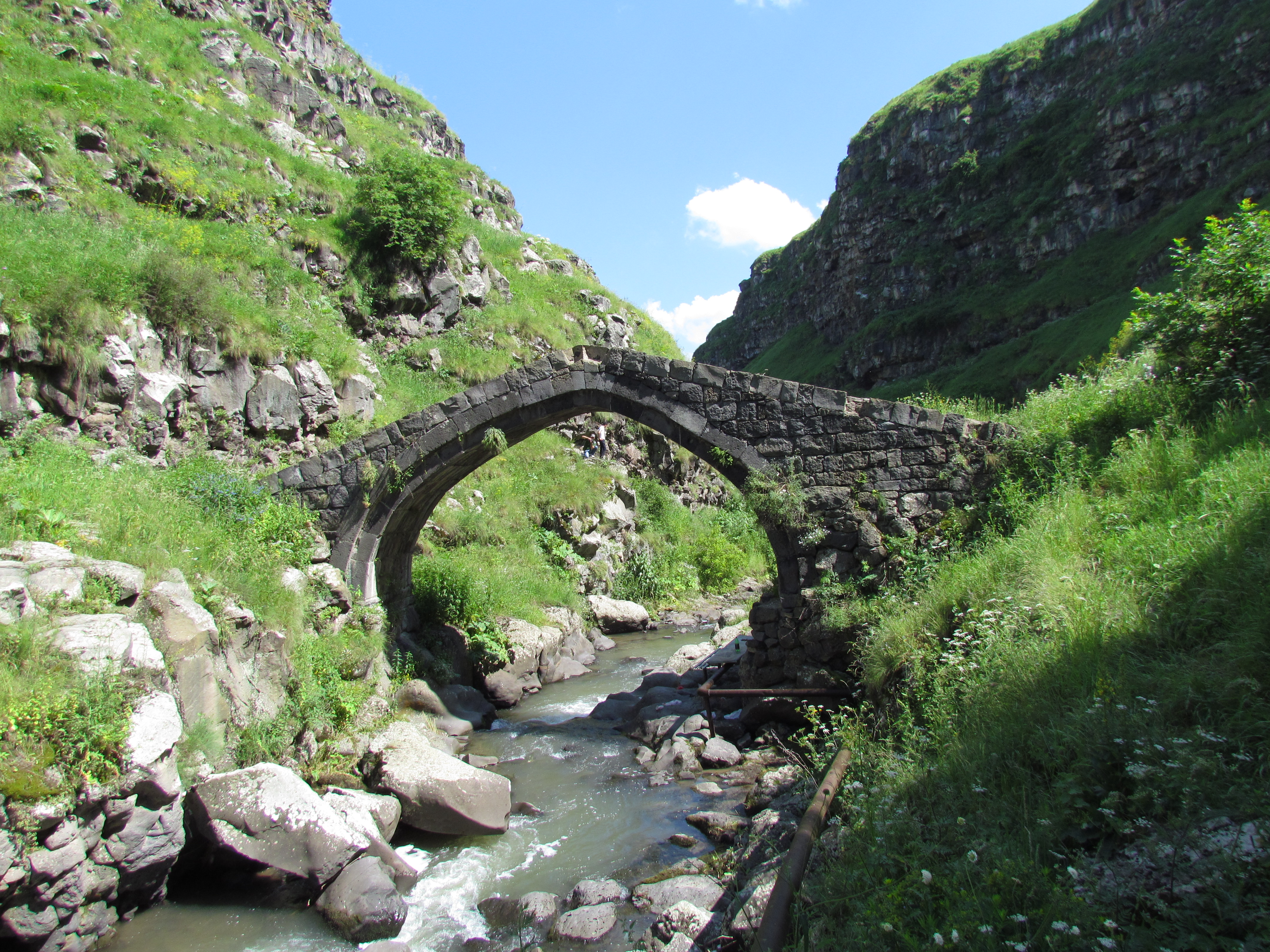

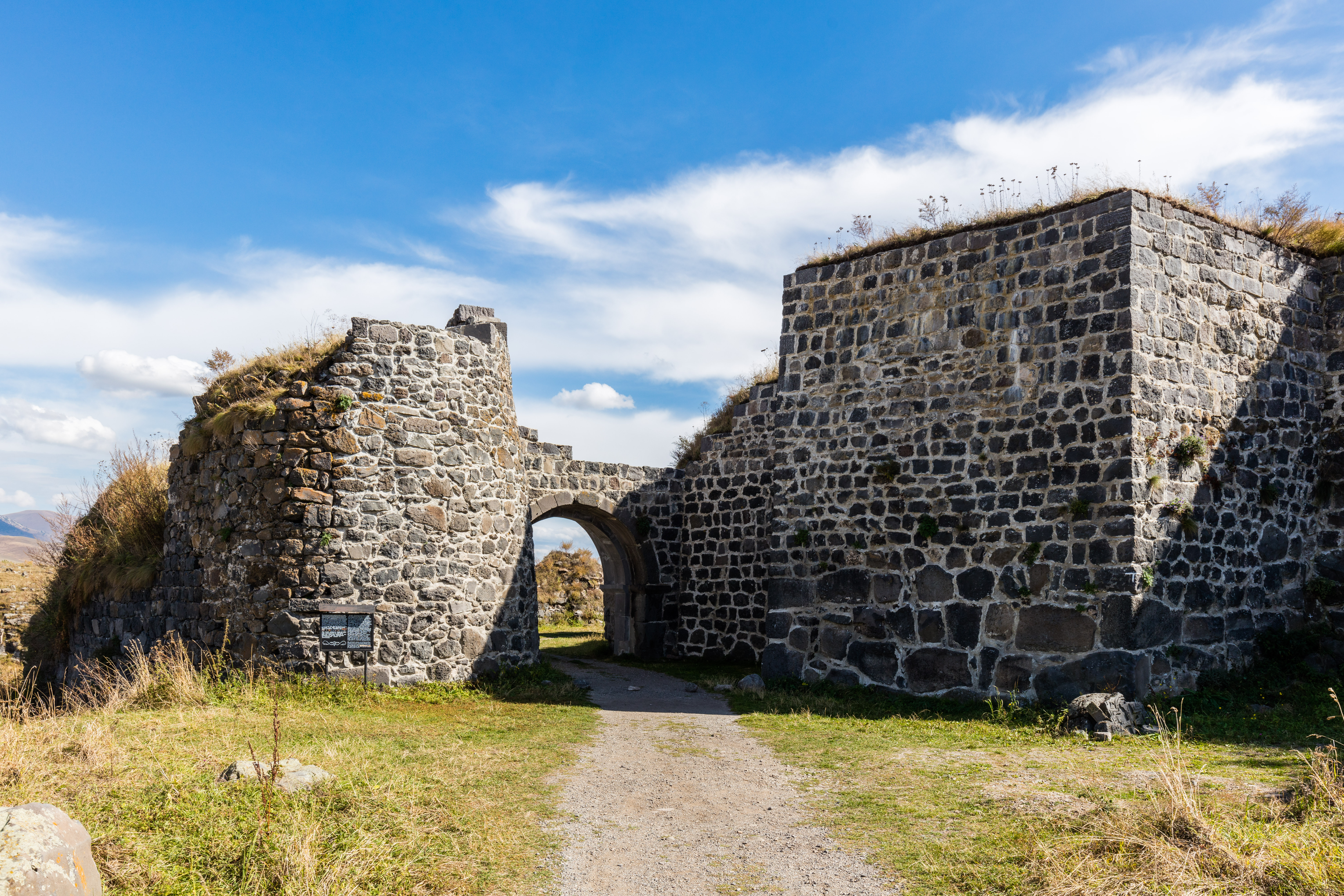

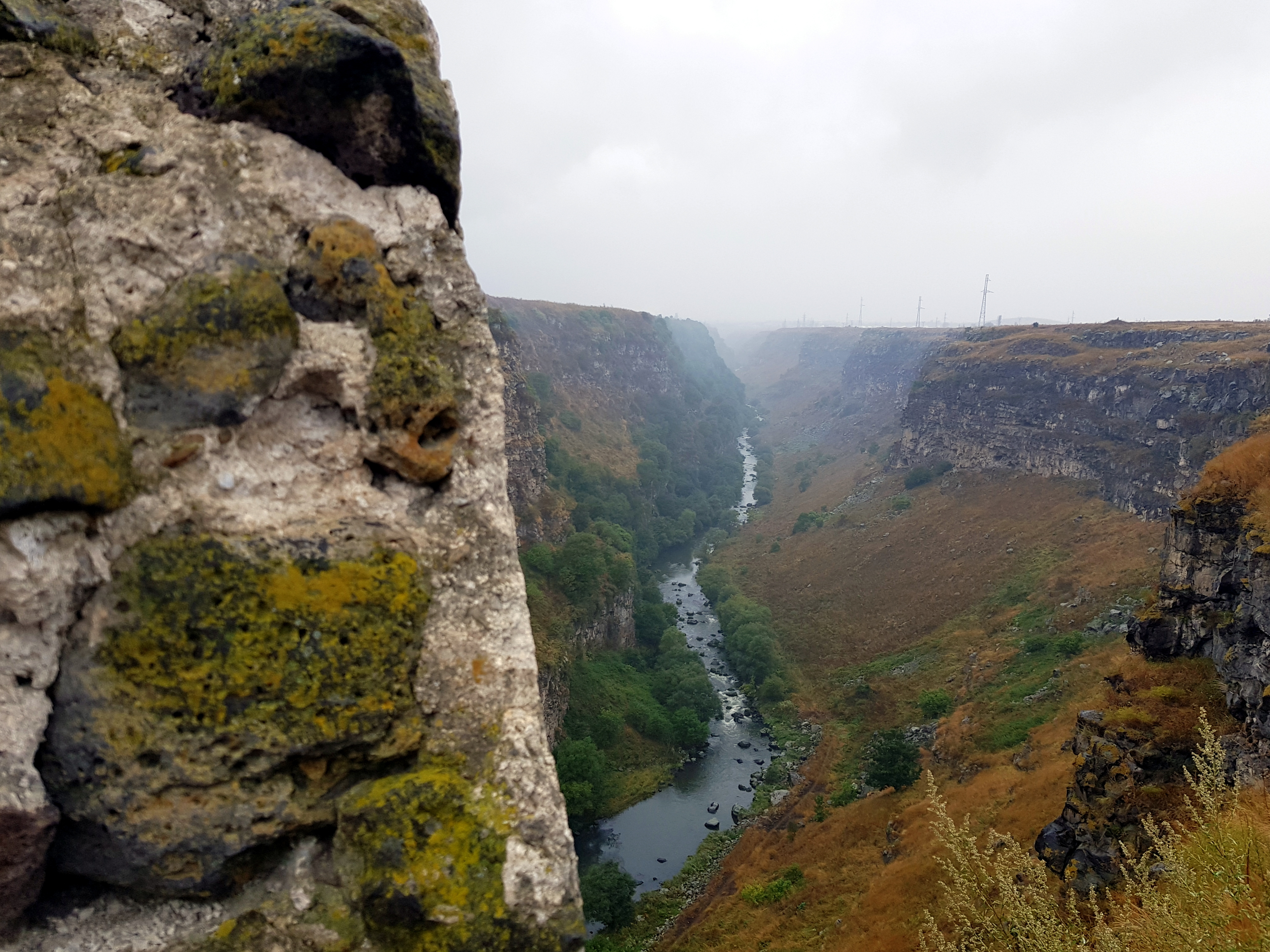

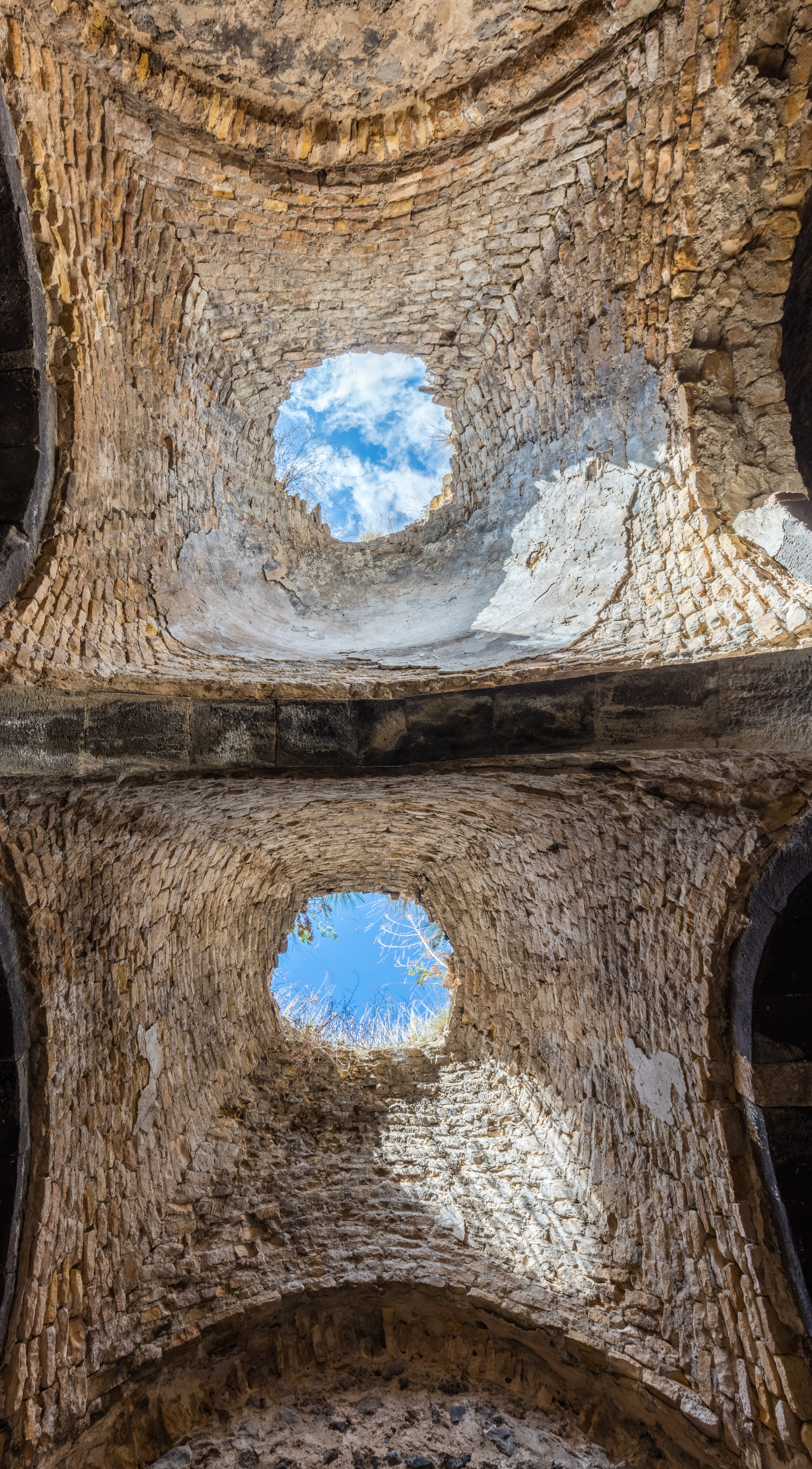

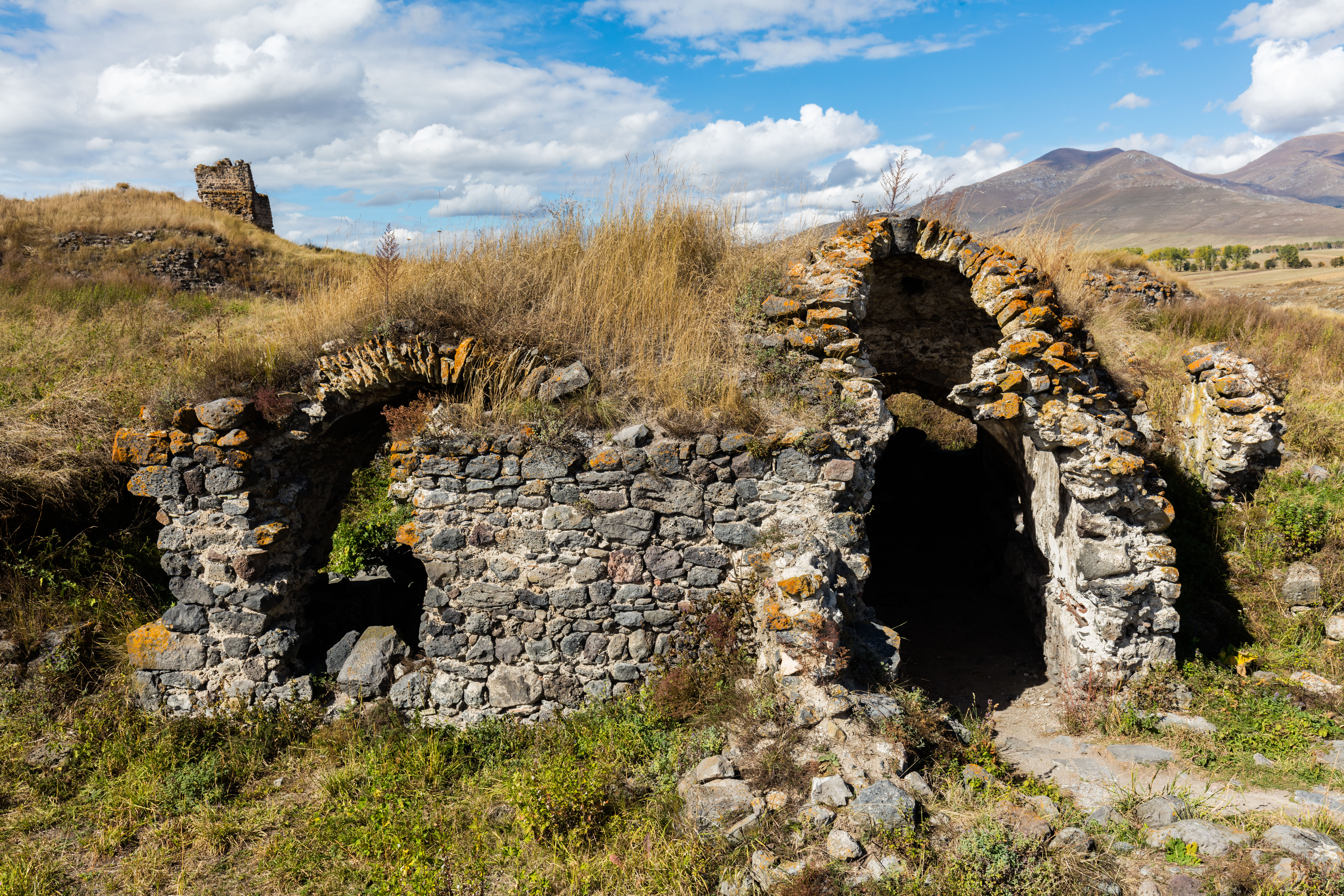

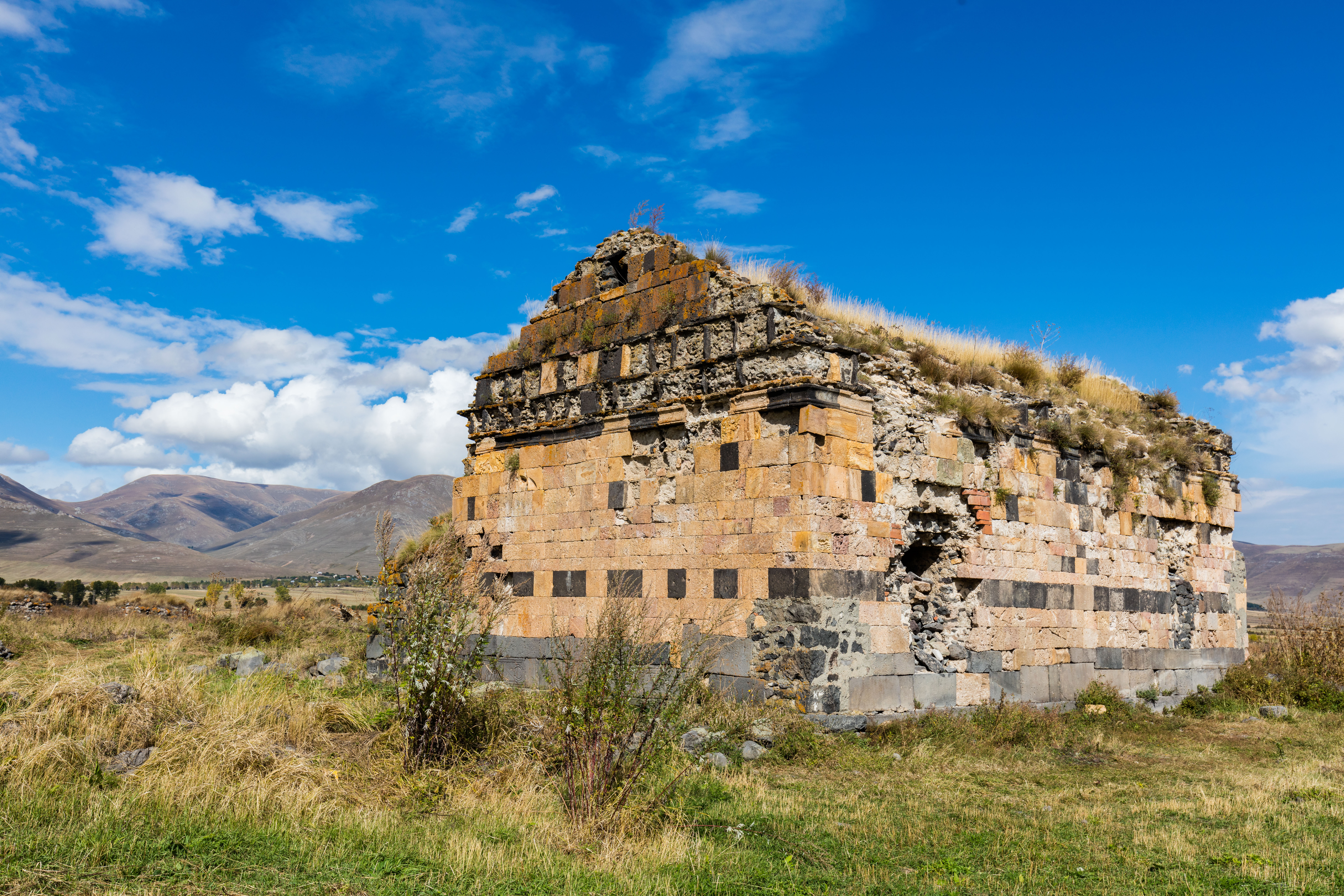

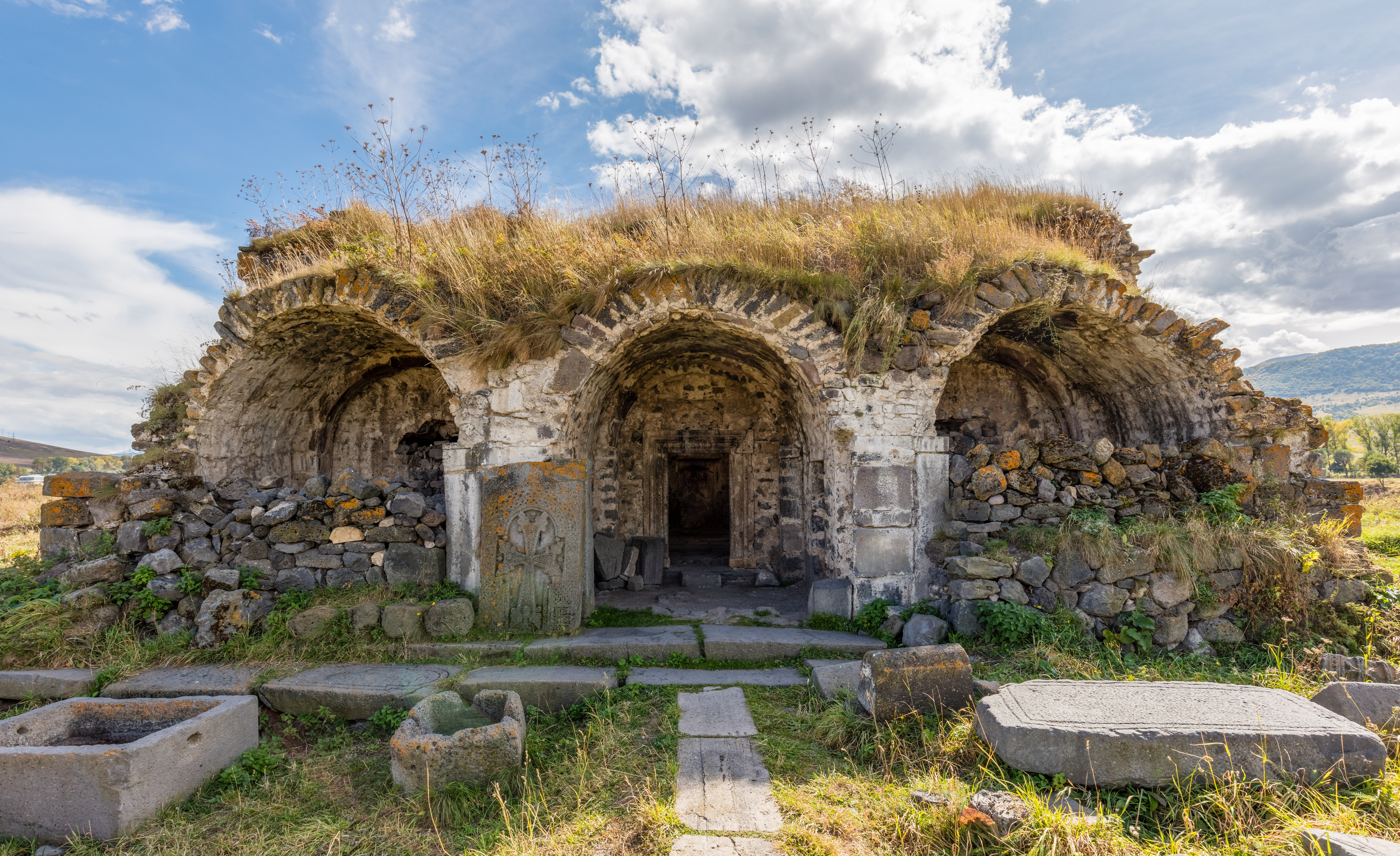

== See also ==
- Lori Berd Hydro Power Plant
