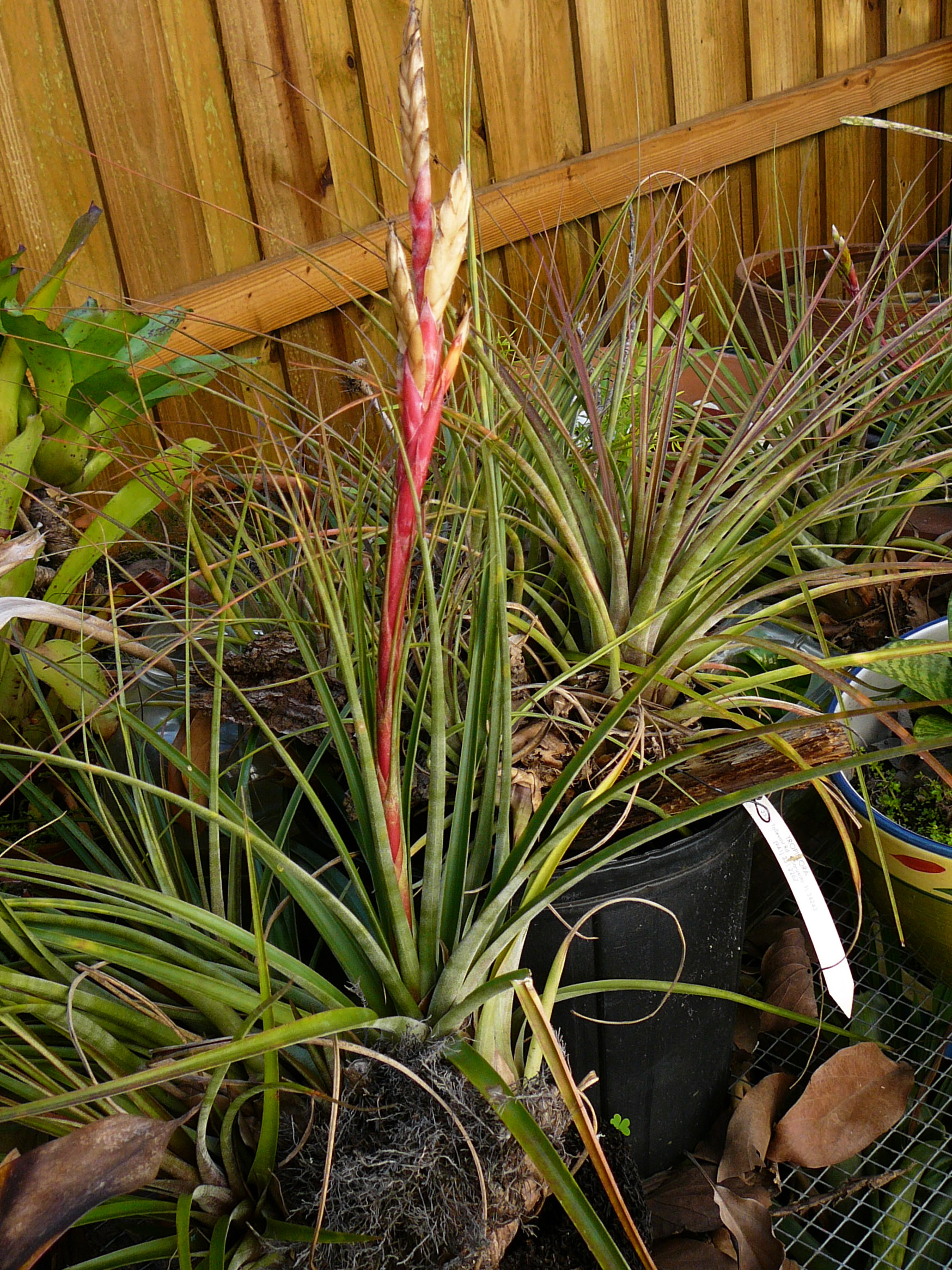

Scientific classification
- Kingdom: Plantae
- Clade: Tracheophytes
- Clade: Angiosperms
- Clade: Monocots
- Clade: Commelinids
- Order: Poales
- Family: Bromeliaceae
- Genus: Tillandsia
- Subgenus: Tillandsia subg. Tillandsia
- Species: T. schiedeana

Binomial name
- Tillandsia schiedeana Steud.

Synonyms
- Tillandsia vestita Schltdl. & Cham. 1831, illegitimate homonym, not Willd. ex Schult. & Schult. f. 1830 nor Benth. 1840; Tillandsia flavescens M.Martens & Galeotti; Tillandsia grisebachii Baker; Tillandsia eggersii Baker

= Tillandsia schiedeana =

Species of plant

Tillandsia schiedeana is a species of flowering plant in the genus, Tillandsia. It was named for the collector Christian Julius Wilhelm Schiede. As an epiphyte, it is found "growing in open tropical forests, and saxicolous, growing on cacti and burseras on steep dry slopes in semiarid regions in Mexico, Central America, West Indies, Venezuela, and Colombia at elevations of 750 to 5,500 feet."

== Description ==
This bromeliad tends to be very variable in form; it is characterized by large but thin stiff leaves. In bloom it forms an inflorescence approximately 40 cm high with yellow or reddish-yellow flowers. It is lightly scaled, prefers full sun, and grows in mounds.

== Cultivars ==
- Tillandsia 'Bruce Aldridge'
- Tillandsia 'Candela'
- Tillandsia 'Jack Staub'
- Tillandsia 'Laurie'
- Tillandsia 'Little Star'
- Tillandsia 'Peltry Jellyfish'
- Tillandsia 'Pixie'
- Tillandsia 'Starburst'
- Tillandsia 'Tiki Torch'
- Tillandsia 'Tooshi'
