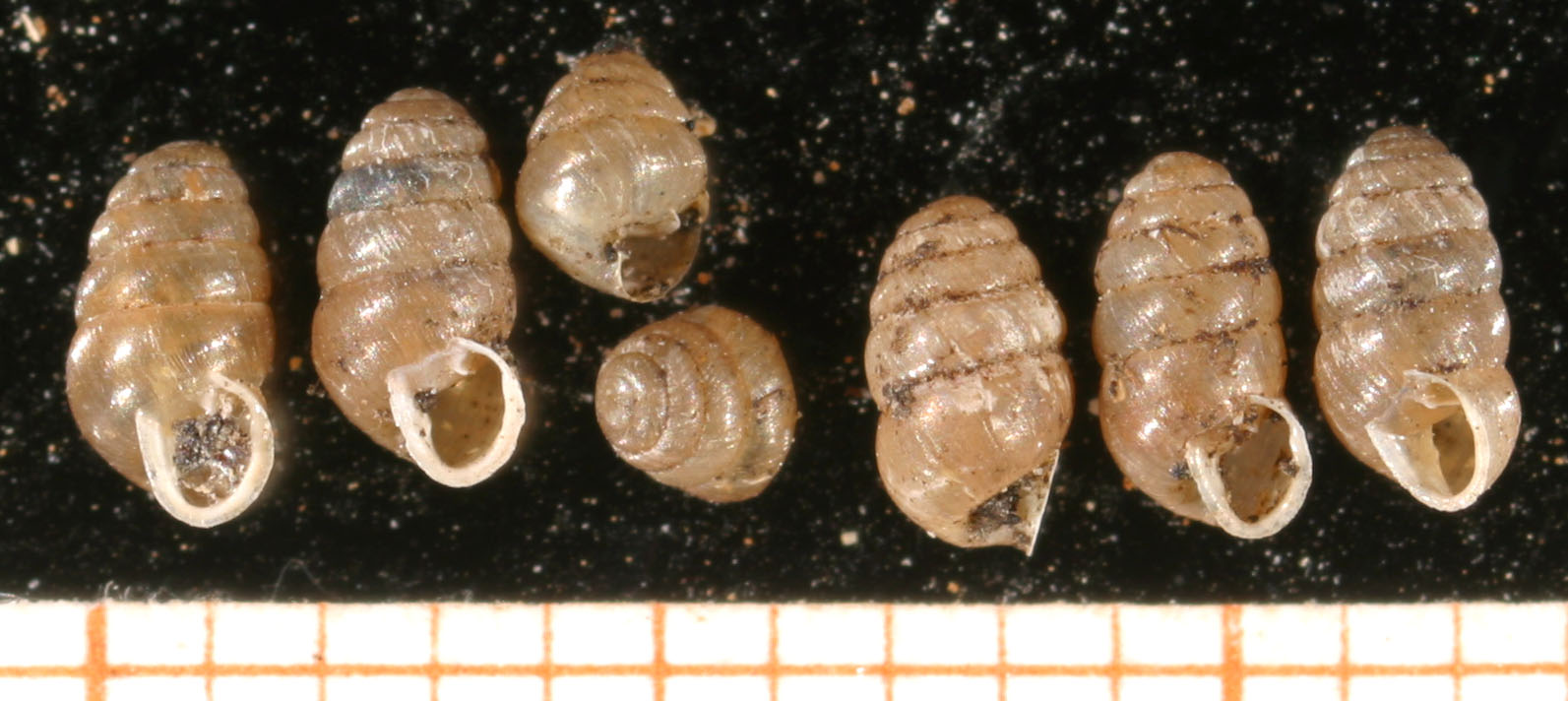
- A group of shells of Lauria cylindracea

Scientific classification
- Kingdom: Animalia
- Phylum: Mollusca
- Class: Gastropoda
- Order: Stylommatophora
- Family: Lauriidae
- Genus: Lauria; Gray, 1840

Type species
- Pupa umbilicata Draparnaud, 1801

Synonyms
- Eruca Swainson, 1840; Gastrodon R. T. Lowe, 1852; Lauria (Lauria) Gray, 1840· accepted, alternate representation; Lauria (Petrarca) Pilsbry, 1922 (junior homonym of Petrarca Fowler, 1899 [Cirripedia]; Lauria (Senilauria) Pilsbry, 1928 is a replacement name); Lauria (Senilauria) Pilsbry, 1928· accepted, alternate representation; Pupa (Lauria) Gray, 1840; Reinhardtia O. Boettger, 1878

= Lauria (gastropod) =

Genus of gastropods

Lauria is a genus of land snails in the family Lauriidae.

== Species ==
Species include:

- Lauria bourbonensis Pilsbry, 1922
- Lauria cryptoplax (Melvill & Ponsonby, 1899)
- Lauria cylindracea (Da Costa, 1778)
- Lauria dadion (Benson, 1864)
- Lauria desiderata (Preston, 1911)
- Lauria fanalensis (R. T. Lowe, 1852)
- Lauria farquhari (Melvill & Ponsonby, 1898)
- Lauria fasciolata (Morelet, 1860)
- Lauria gomerensis D. T. Holyoak & G. A. Holyoak, 2009
- Lauria longa Connolly, 1939
- Lauria reischuetzi Falkner, 1985
- Lauria sempronii (Charpentier, 1837)
- Lauria umbilica (J. R. Roth, 1839)
- Lauria wouramboulchiensis Connolly, 1928

Species brought into synonymy

- Lauria alluaudi Germain, 1934: synonym of Lauria desiderata (Preston, 1911) (junior synonym)
- Lauria austriaca Wenz, 1921 †: synonym of Leiostyla austriaca (Wenz, 1921) † (new combination)
- Lauria bruguierei (Jickeli, 1874): synonym of Lauria cylindracea (Da Costa, 1778)
- Lauria gottschicki Wenz, 1922 †: synonym of Leiostyla gottschicki (Wenz, 1922) † (new combination)
- Lauria minax O. Boettger, 1889 †: synonym of Minacilla minax (O. Boettger, 1889) † (new combination)
- Lauria paulinae Lindholm, 1913: synonym of Leiostyla paulinae (Lindholm, 1913) (original combination)
- Lauria pulchra (Retowski, 1883): synonym of Leiostyla pulchra (Retowski, 1883)
- Lauria tabularis (Melvill & Ponsonby, 1893): synonym of Lauria cylindracea (Da Costa, 1778) (synonym)
- Lauria tenuimarginata Pilsbry, 1922: synonym of Leiostyla tenuimarginata (Pilsbry, 1922) (original combination)
- Lauria umbilicata (Draparnaud, 1801): synonym of Lauria cylindracea (Da Costa, 1778)
- Lauria zonifera Pilsbry, 1934: synonym of Leiostyla zonifera (Pilsbry, 1934) (original combination)
