= Laurie Petrou =

Canadian author and professor

- Occupations: Writer; professor
- Website: lauriepetrou.com

Laurie Petrou is a Canadian author and professor. She won the Half the World Global Literati Award in 2016 for Sister of Mine.

== Career ==
Petrou is a full professor at Toronto Metropolitan University (formerly Ryerson University) in the RTA School of Media. She won the inaugural Half the World Global Literati Award in 2016 for her manuscript, Sister of Mine. In 2017, HarperCollins acquired the Canadian rights to the manuscript. Crooked Lane Books acquired U.S. rights in 2018. The book was published in 2018 and was Petrou's first novel. She had previously published Between, a collection of short stories.

Petrou's novel, Stargazer, was released in 2022. That same year, it was optioned by the Canadian production company Nikki Ray Media Agency.

== Personal life ==
Petrou lives in the Niagara region of Ontario.

== Books ==
- Between (Pedlar Press, 2006)
- Sister of Mine (Crooked Lane Books/HarperCollins, 2018)
- Love, Heather (Crooked Lane Books, 2019)
- Stargazer (Verve Books, 2022)
- The Rehearsal Club (Groundwood Books, 2025), co-authored with Kate Fodor
- The Rayburn Affair (House of Anansi Press, 2026)
