= Lory Lake =

Lake in the state of Minnesota, United States

- Location within Minnesota
- Location: Isanti County, Minnesota
- Coordinates: 45°43′17″N 93°21′29″W
- Type: lake

Lory Lake is a lake in Isanti County, in the U.S. state of Minnesota. It was named after H. A. Lory, an early landowner at the time. The most common species of fish caught in this lake include Northern pike, Largemouth Bass, and Walleye.

== See also ==
- List of lakes in Minnesota
