= Lorre =

Lorre is a surname of Hungarian origin. People with this surname include:

- Chuck Lorre (born 1952), American television writer and producer
- Inger Lorre (1963–2024). American singer
- Peter Lorre (1904–1964), Hungarian-American actor

== See also ==
- 5438 Lorre, a main-belt asteroid
- Loree (disambiguation)
