= Nicolás Lauría Calvo =

Argentine footballer (born 1974)

Personal information
- Full name: Nicolás Fernando Lauría Calvo
- Date of birth: 27 March 1974 (age 52)
- Place of birth: Santa Fe, Argentina
- Position: Forward

Youth career
- Argentinos Juniors

Senior career*
Years	Team	Apps	(Gls)
1993–1996	Argentinos Juniors	26	(6)
1996	Banfield	7	(0)
1997	Colón	1	(0)
1997	Colo-Colo	0	(0)
1998–1999	Arsenal de Sarandí	9	(0)
1999–2000	Juventud Antoniana	9	(0)
2001	Independiente Rivadavia	0	(0)

Managerial career
- 2011: Central Norte
- * Club domestic league appearances and goals

Nicolás Fernando Lauría Calvo (born May 27, 1974, in Santa Fe (Province of Santa Fe), Argentina) is a former Argentine football player who played in clubs of Argentina and Chile.

== Teams ==
=== Player ===
- (Argentina) Argentinos Juniors 1993–1996
- (Argentina) Banfield 1996
- (Argentina) Colón 1997
- (Chile) Colo-Colo 1997
- (Argentina) Arsenal de Sarandí 1998–1999
- (Argentina) Juventud Antoniana 1999–2000
- (Argentina) Independiente Rivadavia 2001

=== Manager ===
- (Argentina) Central Norte 2011

== Personal life ==
His brother, Gabriel, was with the Argentinos Juniors youth ranks.
