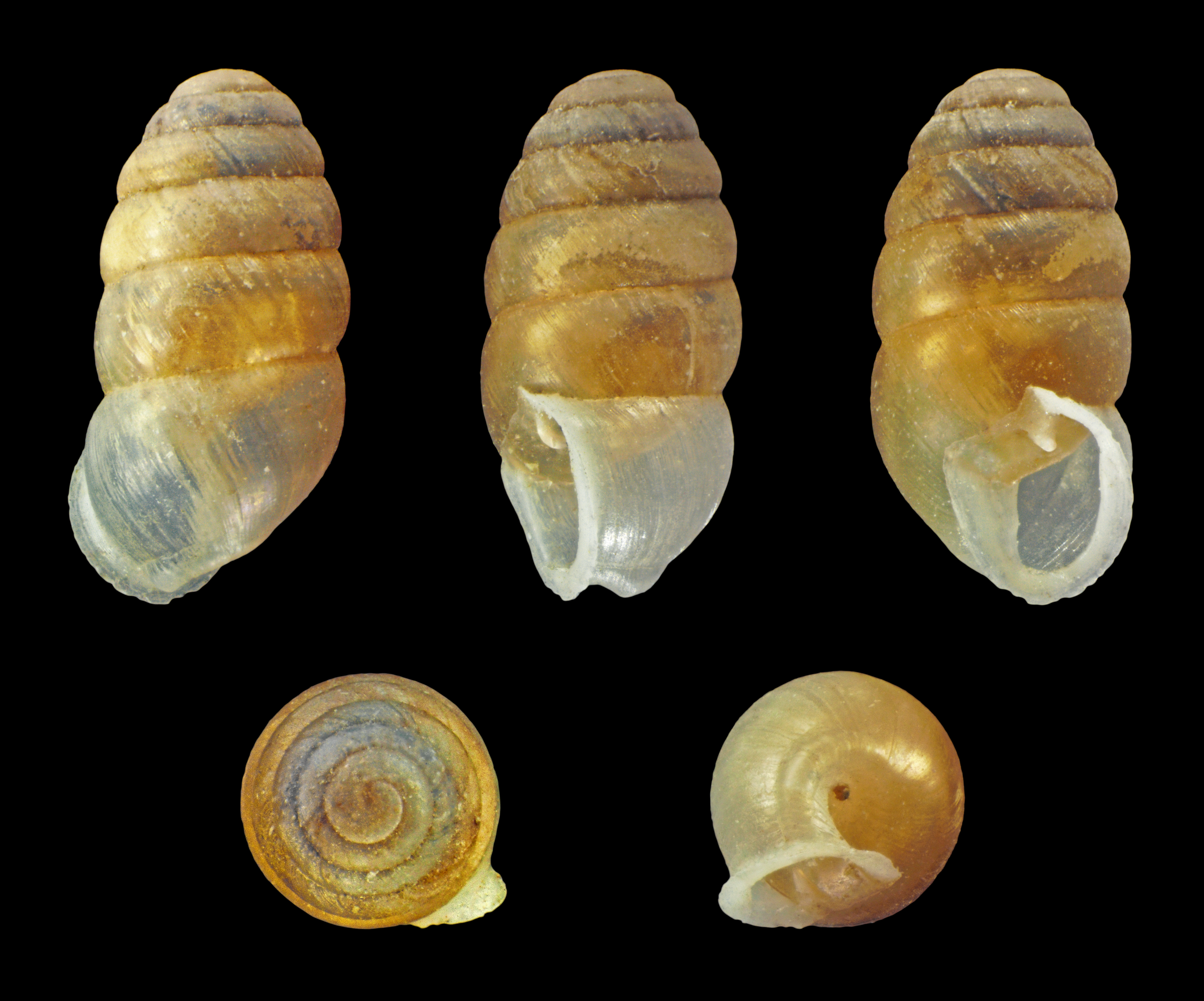
- A shell of Lauria cylindracea

Conservation status
- Secure (NatureServe)

Scientific classification
- Kingdom: Animalia
- Phylum: Mollusca
- Class: Gastropoda
- Order: Stylommatophora
- Family: Lauriidae
- Genus: Lauria
- Species: L. cylindracea

Binomial name
- Lauria cylindracea (E. M. da Costa, 1778)

= Lauria cylindracea =

Species of gastropod

Lauria cylindracea, the common chrysalis snail, is a species of air-breathing land snail, a terrestrial pulmonate gastropod mollusc in the family Lauriidae.

== Description ==
The 3-4 x 1.8 mm shell is oval with a blunt apex and 5-6 weakly convex whorls. The last whorl has the largest diameter. The aperture with parietalis and with or without angular tooth. The margin is white, sharp and reflected in fully grown specimens, usually with a whitish parietal callus. The umbilicus is open and narrow. The shell colour is brown, transparent and shiny. It is weakly striated. Juveniles have additional folds visible from outside the shell. The animal is dark with lighter sides and foot. The upper tentacles are short, the lower tentacles very short. The animal crawls with the shell in a high and almost straight position.

== Distribution ==
This species is known to occur in a number of countries and islands:

- Great Britain
- Ireland
- Ukraine
- Portugal
- Belgium
- The Netherlands
- and other areas

It has been introduced to:

- British Columbia, Canada
- New Zealand
