= Lyra (name) =

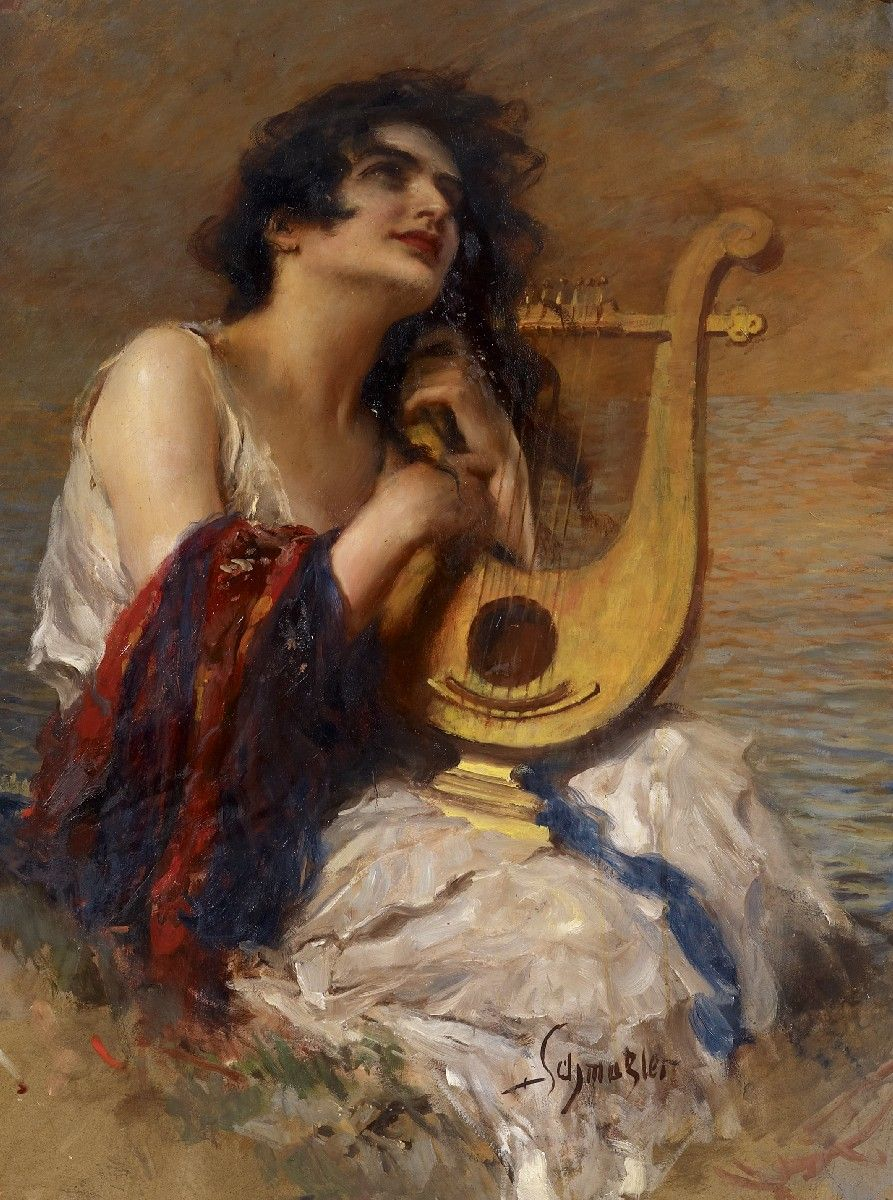
- Mädchen mit Lyra (Girl with Lyre) by Leopold Schmutzler
- Pronunciation: LYE-ruh
- Gender: female
- Language: English

Origin
- Origin: Greek, Latin
- Meaning: lyre

Lyra is a feminine given name of Greek and Latin origin meaning lyre. It is usually given in reference to the constellation and the Greek myth that inspired its naming. The name has associations with music and harmony and the night sky. The name has recently increased in usage due to a character in His Dark Materials, a book trilogy by Philip Pullman, and the television show and film adapted from the books.

== Usage ==
The name has been among the one thousand most used names for newborn girls in the United States since 2015 and among the five hundred most used names for American newborn girls since 2021. The name has ranked among the top five hundred most used names for newborn girls in England and Wales since 2009 and among the top one hundred names since 2020. Usage of the name was first recorded in Ireland in 2009, when three Irish girls were named Lyra. The name was among the top three hundred names for girls in Ireland in 2021, when nineteen newborn Irish girls were given the name.

== People ==
=== As a given name ===
- Lyra McKee (1990–2019), Northern Irish journalist and author
- Lyra Taylor (1894–1979), social worker and lawyer from New Zealand

=== As a surname ===
- Carlos Lyra (1933–2023), Brazilian musician
- Carmen Lyra (1887–1949), pseudonym of female Costa Rican writer, born Maria Isabel Carvajal Quesada
- Cristina Lyra (born 1976), Brazilian sports and newscaster
- Débora Lyra (born 1989), Brazilian actress, model and beauty pageant titleholder
- Fernando Lyra (1938–2013), Brazilian politician who served as Minister of Justice
- João Lyra (1931–2021), Brazilian businessman and politician
- Markus Lyra (1945–2024), Finnish retired diplomat

=== Stage name ===
- Lyra, Irish singer-songwriter and musician, Laura Brophy

=== Characters ===
- Lyra Belacqua, one of the two protagonists in Philip Pullman's His Dark Materials trilogy
- Lyra, a character in Mary Renault's 1978 novel The Praise Singer
- She-Hulk (Lyra), a Marvel Comics superhero
- Lyra, a character in the game and anime Mega Man Star Force
- Lyra (Pokémon), the female player character in Pokémon HeartGold and SoulSilver
- Lyra Heartstrings, a background character in My Little Pony: Friendship Is Magic
- Lyra (Silver Key), a Celestial Spirit character in Fairy Tail
- Lyra Erso, a character in the Star Wars universe
- Lyra Dawnbringer, an angel in Magic: The Gathering
- Lyra, a hero in the Vainglory (video game) MOBA game
- Lyra Valkyria, in-ring name of the irish wrestler Aoife Cusack
