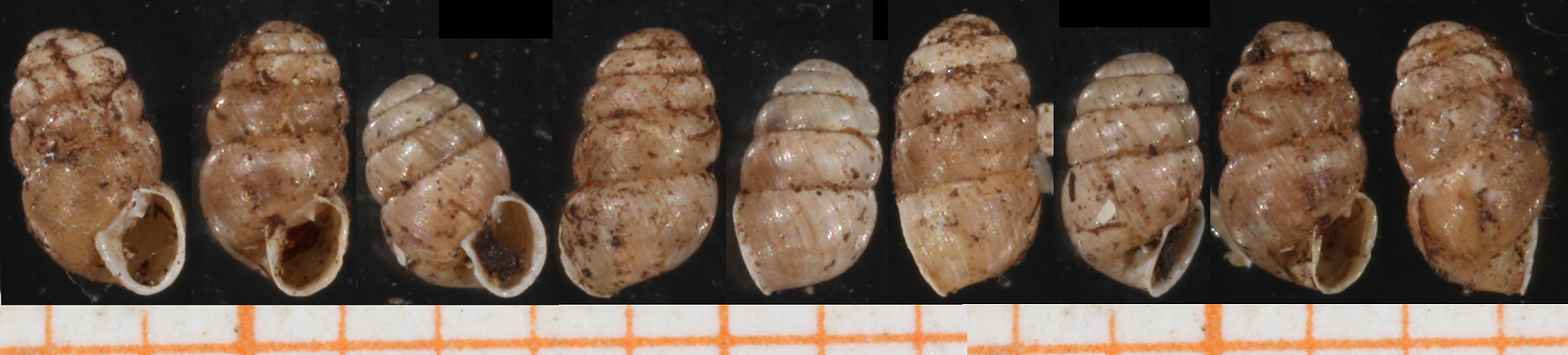
- Shells of Lauria sempronii

Scientific classification
- Domain: Eukaryota
- Kingdom: Animalia
- Phylum: Mollusca
- Class: Gastropoda
- Order: Stylommatophora
- Family: Lauriidae
- Genus: Lauria
- Species: L. sempronii

Binomial name
- Lauria sempronii (Charpentier, 1837)

= Lauria sempronii =

Species of gastropod

Lauria sempronii, is a species of air-breathing land snail, a terrestrial pulmonate gastropod mollusc in the family Lauriidae.

== Distribution ==
This species is known to occur in a number of countries and islands:

- Great Britain
- and other areas
