= Loree Murray =

Loree Murray (January 2, 1921 – 2009) was a community activist in Washington DC.

== Career ==
Murray moved to DC in the early 1940s from Pinehurst, North Carolina.

She led street patrols, known as Orange Hat patrols, to help police document drug activity. In 1985, she founded the Near Northeast Citizens Against Crimes and Drugs. She was also one of the founding members of the H Street Festival and was an advocate for statehood for the District of Columbia.

Cohen Companies named a building in her honor, the Loree Grand, built on the border of the North of Massachusetts Business District.
