= Laurie Marsden =

American model, therapist, writer and activist

- Born: Laurie Ann Gehen
- Occupation: Fashion model
- Movement: #MeToo

Laurie Ann Marsden (née Gehen) is an American model, therapist, writer and activist. A former model in the 1980s and 1990s, she is an activist of #MeToo in the fashion industry and speaks internationally to protect women from violence.

== Career ==
Marsden was a model in the eighties and early nineties and was photographed for magazines including covers.

In the mid-1990s Marsden attended Columbia University. She graduated magna cum laude from Columbia University's School of General Studies and then received her Master's in Social Work also from Columbia University. Marsden is a Licensed Clinical Social Worker, a member of the Australian Association of Social Workers and developed an online therapy program for women in 2013.

=== Activism ===
Marsden is currently an activist in the #metoo movement in the fashion industry. She gave speeches at two Women's Marches in Sag Harbor, New York. She has spoken openly about a sexual assault by former agent Gerald Marie while modeling in Paris in the 1980s. She supports 15 fellow survivors and has given testimony to French authorities, though they cannot prosecute the perpetrator due to the Statute of Limitations. She gave a speech to the French Senate on September 14, 2021, regarding changing and reforming laws to aid sexual abuse survivors. She addressed the EU Parliament in October 2022 to help stop violence against women. Asked why women don't come forward earlier with sexual assault accusations she told the BBC, “Many people will not talk about it and will not disclose it, really because they are not psychologically capable of doing so. And that's a really important point that has not been taken into account when the laws were written.”
