= Lauri Sommer =

Estonian writer and literary scholar

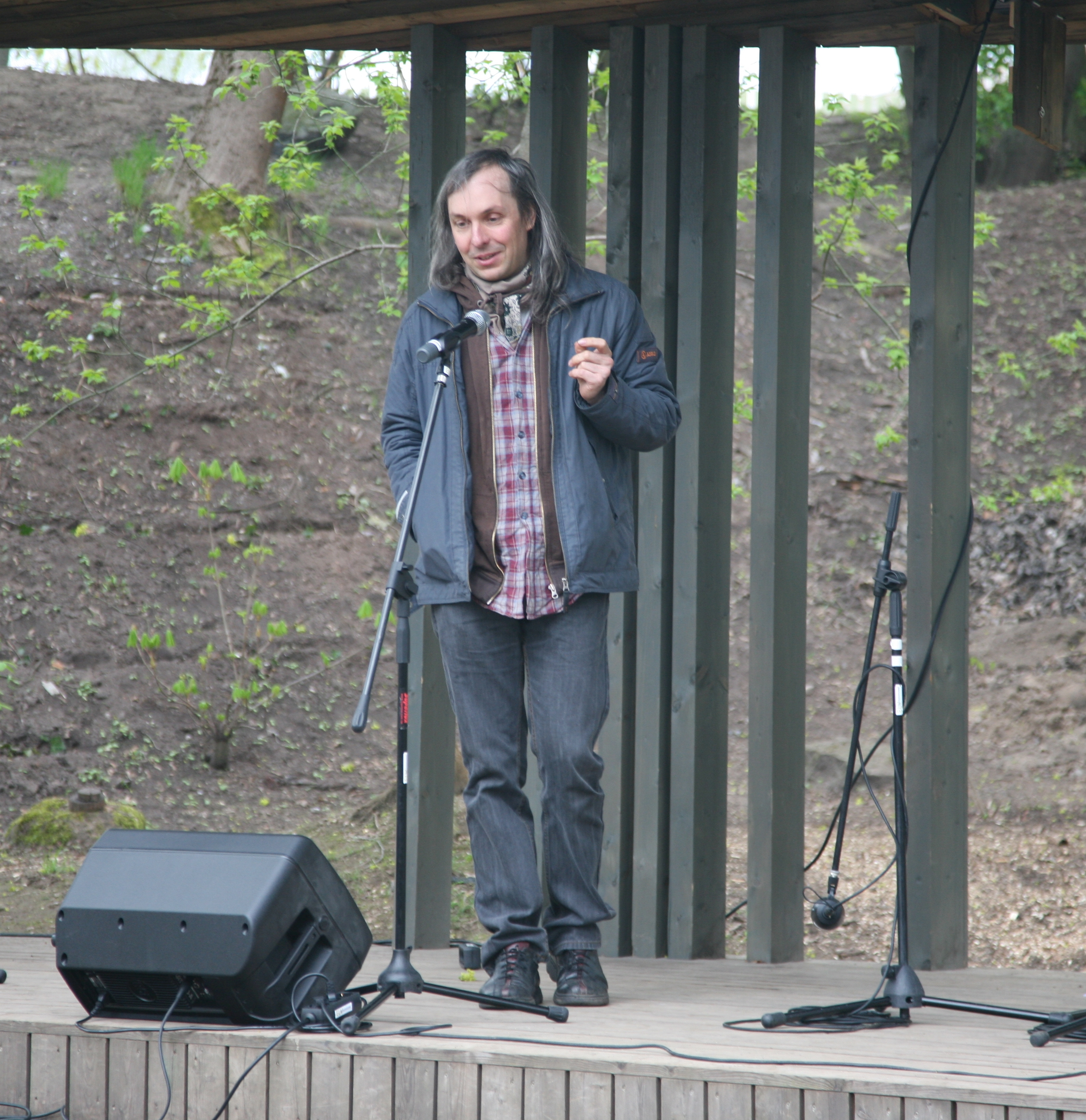
Lauri Sommer

Lauri Sommer (born Lauri Soomere, 2 April 1973 in Viljandi) is an Estonian writer, literary scholar, translator and musician.

In the 1990s, he was a member of literary group Erakkond.

In 2004, he published the music album "Piimaš".

In 2021, he was awarded with Order of the White Star, V class.

== Works ==
- 1998: poetry collection "Laurila"
- 2001: poetry collection "Raagraamis poiss" ('A Boy in Twigframe')
- 2004: poetry collection "Nõidade õrnus" ('Tenderness of Enchanters')
