= Lori Roach =

Bahamian road racing cyclist (born 1970)

Lori Roach (born 23 October 1970) is a Bahamian road racing cyclist and triathlete.

In 2019, she placed second in the Bahamas National Championship Women's time trial and also participated in the aquabike competition in the 2019 Caribbean Age Group Triathlon.

In 2024 she became the first female president of Bahamas Triathlon Association.
