= Laurie Walker (artist) =

Canadian artist (1962-2011)

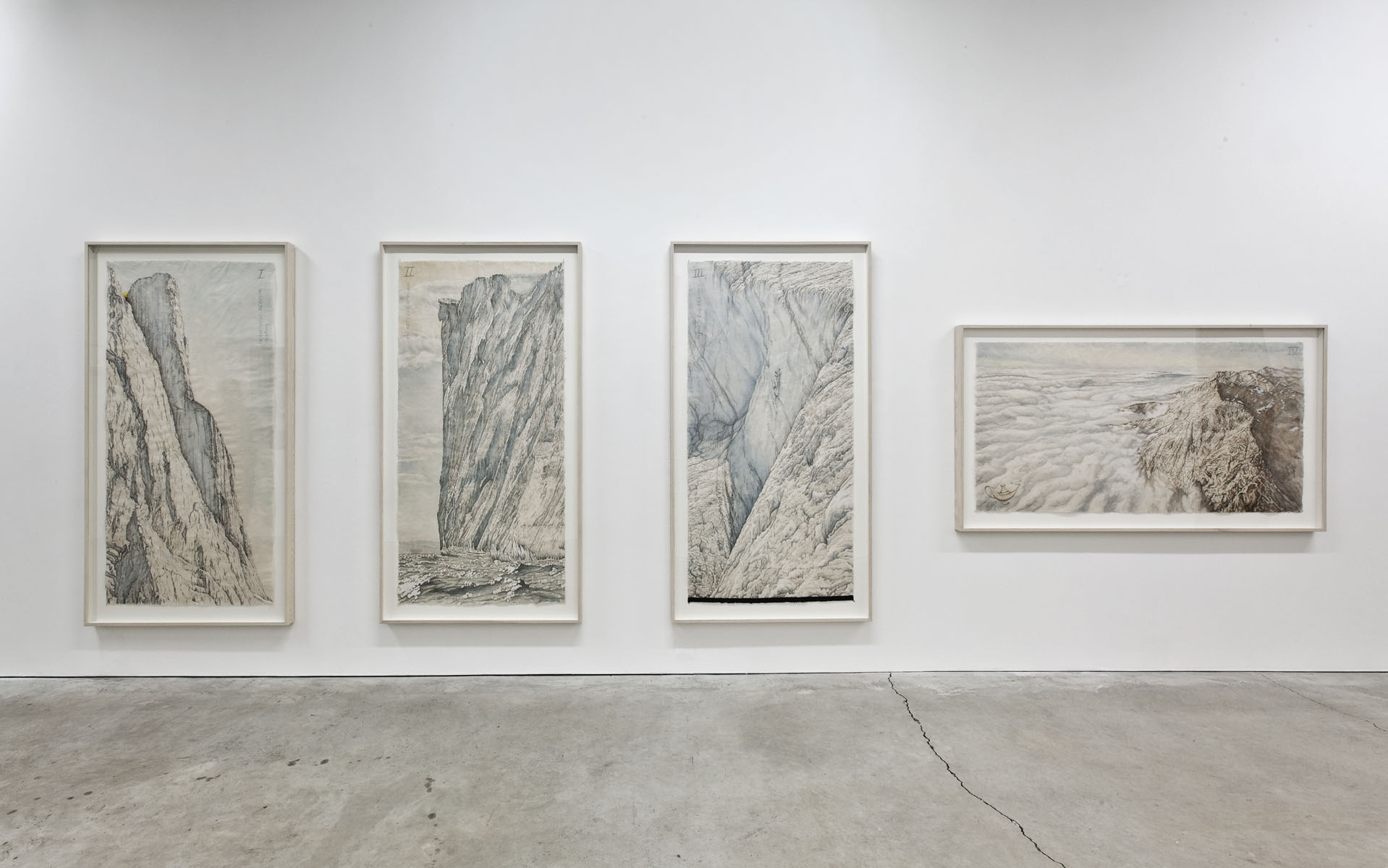
- Laurie Walker, "Prometheus Rebound", 2005 - 2008 (installation view)
- Born: February 2, 1962; Montreal, Quebec, Canada
- Died: February 11, 2011 (aged 49); Montreal, Quebec, Canada
- Known for: interdisciplinary artist

Laurie Walker (February 2, 1962 – February 11, 2011) was a Canadian interdisciplinary artist who produced large scale installations merging mythology and scientific references. She was widely exhibited in Canadian art museums and galleries, and discussed in numerous articles and monographs from 1987 to the early 2000s.

== Education ==
In 1984, she earned a Bachelor of Fine Arts form Mount Allison University. In 1987, she received a Master of Fine Arts form the Nova Scotia College of Art and Design.

== Artistic periods ==
=== Early work ===
Laurie Walker c. 1984. Photo: Paul Christopher

Walker's early installations combined botanical illustrations with industrial machinery. Utilizing diverse materials (such as: steel, copper, paraffin, watercolour on paper, book, pressed plant, glass, oak, Carrara marble, Belgian black marble, oak, beeswax and more...) Walker analyzed sculptural ciphers across knowledge domains. The theorist Daina Augaitis wrote (in a 1991 essay published by the Banff Centre for the Arts entitled 'Seeing nature: and the works of Bill Viola and Laurie Walker'): "Each of these works draws on layers of reference which entwine historically constructed notions of knowledge, authority and beauty with contemporary understandings of natural environments." In the first decade after her graduation from university (1987–), Walker's signature style paid rigorous attention to materials. She explored personal identity transformed through a synthesis of ancient mythological references, industrial tools, taxidermy, botanical illustrations and biological organisms (bioluminescent bacteria, pigs bladders, etc...). In 1994, this culminated in a solo show: "Laurie Walker - Seeing Blue" at the Musee d’art contemporain de Montreal, Montreal, Quebec. The curator of 'Seeing Blue', Pierre Landry described how: "The strange seductive power of these works stems as much from the mastery they show in their use of techniques and material, both varied (wood, copper, marble, watercolor) and sometimes, uncommon (peat moss, bioluminescent bacteria…) as from the symbolic information…" In 1994, the critic John Armstrong reiterated these assessments in a review of Walker's work: "The natural, here as in her other works, is committed to representation's own symbiotic narratives."

=== Mid-career (1995–2005) ===
In her mid career, Walker's research interests expanded to include biomedical appendages, taxidermy, neurology, projection and EEG. Her eclectic use of materials explored combinations of the organic and synthetic: Kheper beetle, gold leaf, sheep manure, peat moss, overhead projectors, water, IV bags, glass, watercolours on enlarged EEG printouts. In many respects, Walker’s distinctive hybrid creation constituted a unique sculptural vocabulary.

The OBORO catalog for Walker’s show 'Portrait of the Artist as a Wave' (2001) analyzed her work as follows: "Since the late 1980s Laurie Walker has developed a singular body of work. The large sculptures and the drawings she has produced since that time have been nourished by interrogations concerning the forces of nature, spirituality and science.... The installation at OBORO takes us this time into the world of sleep, inviting us to consider some of its phenomena....In a concrete way A Portrait of the Artist as a Wave is an interaction of light and water waves with patterns of the artist’s brain waves. In the words of the artist: "The work acts as a meditation on the flux of time and the nature of the wave while representing the mind as both scientific data and subjective imagery."’

=== Later life (illness and final works) ===
From the early 2000s onward, Walker's output as an artist and career profile diminished after she was struck by Chronic Fatigue Immune Dysfunction Syndrome (CFIDS). Walker's last decade of life was lived in seclusion in Montreal, looking for a cure for CFIDS. According to her obituary, even as Walker's illness negatively impacted her capacity to work, she developed hypotheses and made contributions to research into the origins of CFIDS. While chronically ill, from 2005–2008, Walker completed a set of four large-scale drawings entitled Prometheus Rebound which were exhibited at Susan Hobbs Gallery in Toronto after her death in 2011. The catalog for that show states: "Walker's work held a high degree of fabrication, and was deliberately made from materials carrying weighty symbolic charges that echoed her deep interest in the natural sciences, ancient mythology, and environmental concerns. Her journals are a testament to her thorough research on these topics while also containing some ruminations on the chronic illness that affected the last years of her life and her more recent work." As stated in NOW magazine: "Walker's last drawings are a window into an eclectic and unique art practice that compressed weighty conundrums into elegant images."

== Collections ==
- Musee d’art contemporain de Montreal
- Musée national des beaux-arts du Québec, Quebec
- Canada Council Art Bank, Ottawa
- Musee regional de Rimouski, Quebec
- National Gallery of Canada, Ottawa
- Agnes Etherington Art Centre, Kingston
- Musée des beaux arts de Montréal, Montréal
