= Pietro Lauri =

French painter

Pietro Lauri (middle 17th century) (also called Pietro Laurier) was a French painter, active mainly in Bologna.

He lived most of his life in Bologna, where he was brought up in the school of Guido Reni. He painted several pictures for the churches at Bologna, including for the Cappuccini, a picture of the Virgin presenting the Infant Jesus to St. Felix; and in La Madonna della Liberta, a St. Anthony of Padua.
