= Lauri Soininen =

Lauri Soininen (1 April 1875 - 2 September 1919) was a Finnish journalist and poet.

He was the son of Eerik Soininen and Brita Kaisa Similä. He made his debut in 1895 with the book Runopisareita. Soininen wrote several detective novels under the name Lauri Sauramo. He published his poetry under the pen name Lauri Soini. He also wrote under the pen names Juho Ahava, Lauri Sauramo, Eräs osatoveri, Iku Turso, Sasu Punanen (it was also used by Yrjö Räisänen), L.Sininen, Smo, Nuorisoseuralainen, Tuomo, Monto, and Korven Tuomo.

== Bibliography ==
- 1895 Runopisareita
- 1896 Savon saloilta
- 1896 Saaressa
- 1897 Aaro
- 1898 Kansanopistosta ja kansanopiston ympäristöltä
- 1900 Kansallisia lauluja
- 1902 Kansa ja kannel
- 1903 Kuoleman kilpakosija
- 1903 Nuoren kansan laulukirja
- 1903 Punasta ja Vihreää
- 1904 Mikko Miheläinen
- 1904 Taikapeli
- 1905 Naisten ääni
- 1905 Pianonvirittäjä
- 1905 Salojen Elämää
- 1908 Paratiisi ullakolla
- 1909 Kirjavassa hameessa
- 1909 Koti kulta
- 1910 Isä Johannes
- 1911 Luostarin metsästäjä
- 1911 Pyhä hymy
- 1912 Koitereen rannalla
- 1912 Niskureita
- 1912 Vanha Helsinki Vantaan suulla
- 1912 Punakaartin päällikön tytär
- 1913 Juhani ja Elina
- 1913 Kalervo
- 1916 Pyhäsaaren arvoitus
