= Lory (disambiguation) =

A Lory is a small to medium-sized arboreal parrot.

Lory may also refer to:

== People ==
- Al De Lory (1930–2012), an American record producer, arranger, conductor and session musician
- Donna De Lory (born 1964), an American singer, dancer and songwriter
- Milo B. Lory (1903–1974), an American sound editor

== Other uses ==
- Lory, a fictional parrot, a minor character in the Alice series by Lewis Carroll
- Lory Lake, in Minnesota, U.S.
- Lory State Park, near Fort Collins, Colorado, U.S.

== See also ==
- Lorry (disambiguation)
- Lori (disambiguation)
- Loris (disambiguation)
- Loris, strepsirrhine primates
