= H Street Festival =

Annual street fair in Washington, DC

- Genre: Street fair
- Frequency: Annual
- Location: Washington, D.C.
- Founder: Community-Business Action Coalition
- Most recent: September 19, 2015
- Patrons: H Street Merchants and Professionals Association
- Website: hstreet.org/events/festival/

The H Street Festival is a yearly street festival held in the eastern blocks of H Street in the Near Northeast neighborhood of Washington, D.C.

== History ==
The H Street Festival was first organized by the Community-Business Action Coalition (COMBAC). COMBAC was created by neighborhood residents and businesses after the riots in 1968. The founders included Mr. Walter Ross, Mrs. Loree Murray, Ms. Doris Clark, Ms. Betty Hart, Mr. Idus Holmes and many others. The H Street Merchants and Professionals Association (HSMA) took responsibility for the Festival in the 1980s.

== 2005 Festival ==
In 2005, the event was planned, organized and managed by volunteers Raphael Marshall, Kwasi Frye. Education on the state of artists in DC during 2005 was provided exclusively by Elise Perry.

== 2006 Festival ==
For the 2006 festival, held on September 23, Raphael Marshall and Kwasi Frye took a professional approach to developing and retooling the festival.

== 2007 Festival ==
In 2007, The H Street Festival was repositioned with a new emphasis on the arts and humanities. To celebrate the designation of the community as the Atlas Arts District, Raphael Marshall and Kwasi Frye organized the Festival for Saturday September, 15. The festival focused on the visual and performing arts, neighborhood history, and the art of ideas, music, design, and food. There were multiple stages featuring a variety of music, from rock to R&B, a DJ booth, and two performing arts stages featuring theater, dance, poetry, and the spoken word.

The 2007 festival included more than 30 music and dance performances, examples of shows from DC Fashion Week, activities for children, and free health screens.

The purpose of making arts the foundation of the "H STREET MUSIC FESTIVAL & BAZAAR" was to focus attention on the developing arts and entertainment district at the eastern end of the H Street corridor, where well-received plays are performed at the H Street Playhouse, funky arts events occur at DC Sanctuary, and the Atlas Theater has been restored as the Atlas Performing Arts Center with theater, dance, and multi-purpose performing spaces. The African Continuum Theatre Company will be resident at the Atlas and the Theater Alliance is the resident company at the H Street Playhouse. In addition, Raphael Marshall and Kwasi Frye want to highlight the often neglected but abundantly rich art community of Washington D.C. Kwasi Frye has also partnered with web design artist Jermaine Fanfair to design the website for next year's festival.
