= Lourie =

Lourie is a family name. In Scotland, Northern England and Ireland, it often appears as Laurie and Lowry. In the pale of settlement it refers to the descendants of Isaac Luria.

Notable people with the surname include:

- Arthur Lourié (1892–1966), Russian composer
- Don Lourie (1899–1990), American football player
- Evgeniya Lourié (Евгения Лурье) - married Boris Pasternak in 1922.
- Joel Lourie (born 1962), Democratic member of the South Carolina Senate
- John Lourie Beveridge (1824–1910), governor of Illinois
- Peter Lourie (born 1952), Michigan writer
- Serge Lourie (born 1946), English councillor and Leader of Richmond upon Thames Council
- James Lourie (born 1952), Washington State artist

== See also ==
- Lourie-Love Field, now Roberts Stadium (soccer stadium) at Princeton University, United States
- Grey lourie, a southern African bird
- Knysna lourie, an African bird
