= Laurie (surname) =

Laurie is a surname given to people belonging to Clan McLaren of Scotland who settled in the Lowlands after migrating from the Highlands of Scotland, specifically those who settled in Dumfries and Galloway of Scotland. The surname Laurie has several pronunciations, and people with this surname are of Scottish descent. Notable people with the surname include:

- Annie Laurie (musician) (1924–2006), African-American jump blues and rhythm and blues singer
- Arthur Pillans Laurie (1861–1949), Scottish chemist, pioneer of the scientific analysis of paintings
- Ben Laurie, founding director of The Apache Software Foundation, core team member of OpenSSL
- Cy Laurie (1926–2002), English jazz clarinettist and bandleader
- Daine Laurie (born 1999), Indigenous Australian professional rugby league footballer
- David Laurie (1833–1897), violin collector
- Eleanor Mary Ord Laurie (1919–2009), British mammalogist
- Greg Laurie (born 1952), Senior Pastor of Harvest Christian Fellowship in Riverside, California
- Hugh Laurie (born 1959), British actor, voice artist, comedian, writer, musician, recording artist and director
- James Laurie (1811–1875), American engineer, a founder of the American Society of Civil Engineers
- Jim Laurie (born 1947), American writer, journalist, and broadcaster known for his work in Asia
- Joan Werner Laurie (1920–1964), founder and editor until her death of SHE magazine
- Joe Laurie, Jr. (1892–1954), vaudeville monologist who later performed on Broadway
- John Laurie (1897–1980), Scottish actor born in Dumfries, Scotland
- John Wimburn Laurie (1835–1912), soldier and political figure in Nova Scotia, Canada and England
- Louis Laurie (1917–2002), American boxer
- Malcolm Laurie (1866–1932), Scottish zoologist
- Mark Laurie (photographer) (born 1955), Canadian photographer
- Mark Laurie (rugby league) (born 1962), Australian rugby league footballer in the 1980s
- Meshel Laurie, Australian comedian and radio-television personality
- Miracle Laurie (born 1981), American actress
- Nancy Walton Laurie (born 1951), daughter of Bud Walton of Walmart
- Park Laurie (1846–1928), politician in South Australia
- Percy Laurie (1880–1962), British Army major general and police officer
- Peter Laurie (1778–1861), British politician who served as Lord Mayor of London
- Piper Laurie (1932–2023), American actress of stage and screen
- Ran Laurie (1915–1998), British physician, rowing champion and Olympic gold medallist; also father of Hugh Laurie
- Sir Robert Laurie, 6th Baronet KCB (1764–1848), an officer of the Royal Navy
- Robert Laurie (bishop) (died 1677), seventeenth-century Church of Scotland prelate
- Robert Laurie (rugby league), Australian former rugby league footballer
- Robert Douglas Laurie (1874–1953), founder and first president of the Association of University Teachers
- Robert Laurie Morant (1863–1920), English administrator and educator
- Robert Peter Laurie (1835–1905), British Conservative Party politician
- Simon Somerville Laurie (1829–1909), Scottish educator
- Stephen P. Laurie, British amateur astronomer
- Steve Laurie (born 1982), Australian footballer
- Thomas Laurie (1938–2020), former chairman of the Traverse Theatre
- Thomas Werner Laurie (1866–1944), London publisher

== See also ==
- Lourie
- Lurie
