= Lorry (disambiguation) =

Lorry is the British English term for a truck, a large motor vehicle.

Lorry may also refer to:

== People ==
- Anne-Charles Lorry (1726–1783), French physician
- Lorry Sant (1937–1995), Maltese politician

== Fiction ==
- Jarvis Lorry, a fictional character in the Charles Dickens novel A Tale of Two Cities
- The Lorry, a 1977 French film
- Lorry (film), Indian Malayalam film released in 1980
- Lorry (TV series), Swedish comedy series from 1989

== Transport ==
- Lorry (horse-drawn), a low-loading platform wagon
- Lorry, or a mine car in the US: an open gondola (or railway car) with a tipping trough

== Places ==
- Lorry-Mardigny, a French commune in the Moselle department
- Lorry-lès-Metz, a French commune in the Moselle department

== Other uses ==
- Lorry, Frederiksberg, a historic building complex in Copenhagen, Denmark
- Lorry, the online handle of Michael Lawrie
- Lorry, a simplification of lorry crane, but can be used to refer to any type of crane

TV 2 Lorry, the former name of Danish regional television channel TV 2 Kosmopol

== See also ==
- Lory (disambiguation)
- Lori (disambiguation)
- Loris (disambiguation)
