= Lurie =

Family name

Lurie is often a Jewish surname, but also an Irish and English surname. The name is sometimes transliterated from/to other languages as Lurye, Luriye, and Lure (from Russian), Lourié (in French).

Other variants include: Lurey, Loria, Luria, Luri, Luryi, Lurier, Laurie, Lourie, Laurier.

== List of people with the surname ==
- Allan Lurie (1923–2015), American voice actor
- Alison Lurie (1926–2020), American novelist
- Bob Lurie (born 1929), former owner of the San Francisco Giants
- Boris Lurie (1924–2008), American artist
- Dan Lurie (1923–2013), American bodybuilding and physical fitness pioneer
- Daniel Lurie (born 1977), American philanthropist, mayor of San Francisco
- David Lurie (born 1951), South African photographer
- David Lurie (born 1939), American equestrian
- Elliot Lurie (born 1948), lead guitarist and songwriter for the band Looking Glass
- Esther Lurie (1913–1998), Israeli painter
- Evan Lurie (born 1954), film and TV composer
- Jacob Lurie (born 1977), American mathematician, professor at Harvard University
- Jeffrey Lurie (born 1951), former Hollywood producer turned NFL team owner
- Jessica Lurie, American composer, performance artist and woodwind player
- John Lurie (born 1952), American actor, musician, painter and producer
- Marty Lurie (born 1972), American professional wrestling manager
- Mitchell Lurie (born 1993), American soccer player
- Morris Lurie (1938–2014), Australian writer
- Peter Lurie (born 1962), American television personality
- Ranan Lurie (born 1932), American Israeli editorial cartoonist and journalist
- Rod Lurie (born 1962), Israeli-American director, screenwriter and former film critic
- Ron Lurie (1941–2020), American politician and businessman
- Wanda Lurie (1911–1989), Polish teacher and charity activist, a witness and victim of the Wola massacre in Warsaw
- Zvi Lurie (1906–1968), Israeli politician, signatory of the Israeli declaration of independence

== Places ==
- Lurie Children's Hospital, named after the Ann and Robert H. Lurie Foundation

== See also ==
- Luri (disambiguation)
- Luria
