= Lowry =

Lowry may refer to:

== People ==
- Adam Lowry (born 1993), American ice hockey player
- Broc Lowry (born 2004), American football player
- Calvin Lowry (born 1983), American football player
- Dave Lowry (born 1965), Canadian ice hockey player
- Desiree Lowry (born 1972), Puerto Rican beauty pageant titleholder
- Scooter Lowry (1919–1989), American child actor and vaudevillian
- Hiram Harrison Lowry (1843–1924), American Methodist missionary to China
- Heath W. Lowry (born 1942), British historian of the Ottoman Empire
- Henry Berry Lowrie (born c. 1845, dis. 1872), Confederate outlaw
- Henry Dawson Lowry (1869–1906), English journalist
- James Lowry Jr. (1820–1876), Scottish mayor of Pittsburgh, Pennsylvania
- James K. Lowry (1942–2021) zoologist. Lowry is his zoological author abbreviation
- Joseph Wilson Lowry (1803–1879), British engraver
- Kyle Lowry (born 1986), American basketball player
- L. S. Lowry (1887–1976), British artist/painter
- Leonard Lowry (1884–1947), New Zealand politician
- Lois Lowry (born 1937), American author
- Malcolm Lowry (1909–1957), British author and poet
- Mark Lowry (born 1958), American comedian
- Martin Lowry (1874–1936), British physical chemist
- Michael Lowry (politician) (born 1953), Irish politician
- Mike Lowry (1939–2017), American politician
- Noah Lowry (born 1980), American baseball pitcher
- Oliver H. Lowry (1910–1996), American biochemist
- Porter Prescott Lowry, American botanist whose standard author abbreviation is Lowry
- Ray Lowry (1944–2008), British cartoonist, illustrator and satirist
- Rich Lowry (born 1968), American editor and columnist
- Robert Lowry (disambiguation)
- Shane Lowry (footballer) (born 1989), Australian/Irish footballer
- Shane Lowry (golfer) (born 1987), Irish golfer
- Sumter de Leon Lowry Jr. (1893–1985), a Florida businessman who ran for governor
- Sylvanus Lowry (c. 1824–1865), American politician
- Thomas Lowry (1843–1909), American businessman
- Tom Lowry (1898–1976), New Zealand cricketer
- Tommy Lowry (1945–2015), English footballer

== Places ==
=== United States ===
- Lowry, Minnesota
- Lowry, South Dakota
- Lowry, Virginia
- Lowry Air Force Base, a former air force base in Colorado
- Lowry Avenue Bridge, Minneapolis, Minnesota
- Lowry City, Missouri
- Lowry Crossing, Texas
- Lowry Park Zoo, Tampa, Florida
- Lowry Run, a stream in Ohio

=== United Kingdom ===
- The Lowry, an art gallery in Salford, England
- The Lowry Academy, a secondary school in Salford, England
- Lowry Hotel in Salford, England

== Other ==
- Lowry (band), Brooklyn-based indie rock band
- Lowry protein assay

== See also ==
- Lavery
- Lourie
- Lowrey (disambiguation)
- Lowrie (disambiguation)
