= Lavery =

Lavery, also spelled Lowry, Lowrie, Lory, Lavoy and Lowery, is an Irish surname derived from the Gaelic Ó Labhradha, meaning the "descendants of Labhradha".

The Ó Labhradha descend from Labhradh, who was the father of Etru, chief of the Monagh, a people belonging to the Irish over-kingdom of Ulaid. At the time of Etru's death in 1056, the sept was located in the area of Magh Rath (present-day Moira, County Down). It is in this area as well as the adjoining part of County Antrim where the surname is still most common. A strong concentration of them can also be found in the Montiaghs district of County Armagh, where many moved to during the Plantation of Ulster.

Due to the number of Laverys in these areas they had to adopt monikers to distinguish between them, as such there were three distinct branches: the Baun-Laverys, from the Irish word bán, meaning "white"; the Roe-Laverys, from the Irish word rua, meaning "red"; and the Trin-Laverys, from the Irish word tréan, meaning "strong". The Trin-Laverys often mistranslated their name into English as Armstrong. An example of the adoption of Armstrong is Dr. John Armstrong who was born Trenlavery.

Some of those who are Lowrys may descend from the Mac Labharaigh of Galloway, Scotland. Many of the Lowrys and Lowries in Ulster descend likewise from Scotland, where their names are variants of Laurie, a diminutive of Lawrence, common in Dumfriesshire. Notable amongst these Lowrys are the Earls of Belmore in County Fermanagh, who descend from the Lauries of Maxwelltown, Kirkcudbrightshire, Scotland.

== Notable people ==
=== Laverys ===
==== Arts and entertainment ====
- Bryony Lavery (born 1947), British dramatist
- Emmet Lavery (1902–1986), American playwright and screenwriter
- Emmet G. Lavery, Jr. (1927–2014), American TV and film producer
- Fred Lavery (born 1955), Canadian singer–songwriter and music producer
- Sir John Lavery (1856–1941), Irish painter
- Hazel Lavery (1880–1935), American–Irish painter, artist's model on Irish banknotes
- Father Sean Lavery (1931–1999), Irish priest and music director
- Sean Lavery (dancer) (1956–2018), American ballet dancer and ballet master

==== Politics ====
- Cecil Lavery (1894–1967), Irish politician and judge
- Frederick Lavery (1898–1971), Australian trade unionist and politician
- Ian Lavery (born 1963), British trade unionist and politician

==== Sport ====
- James Lavery (1929–2024), Canadian sprinter
- Patrick Lavery (1884–1915), English footballer
- Philip Lavery (born 1990), Irish cyclist

==== Other ====
- Dave Lavery (born 1959), American roboticist
- Duke Lavery, character in the daytime soap opera, General Hospital
- Ryan Lavery, character in the daytime soap soap All My Children
- William Edward Lavery (1930–2009), president of Virginia Polytechnic Institute and State University, US
- William J. Lavery (1938–2024), American jurist from Connecticut

=== Lowrys ===
- Calvin Lowry, American football player
- Dave Lowry, ice hockey player
- Dinny Lowry (1934–2025), Irish soccer player
- Flora E. Lowry (1879–1933), American anthologist
- Heath W. Lowry, historian
- Henry Berry Lowrie, Confederate outlaw
- Henry Dawson Lowry, English journalist
- Hiram Harrison Lowry, American missionary to China
- James Lowry, Jr., American politician from Pennsylvania
- Joseph Wilson Lowry, 18th century engraver
- Kyle Lowry, American basketball player
- L. S. Lowry, British artist/painter
- Leonard Lowry (1884–1947), New Zealand politician
- Lois Lowry, author
- Malcolm Lowry, author and poet
- Mark Lowry, comedian
- Martin Lowry, chemist
- Michael Lowry (politician), Irish politician
- Noah Lowry, baseball pitcher
- Oliver H. Lowry (1910–1996), American biochemist
- Ray Lowry, cartoonist, musician
- Rich Lowry, editor and columnist
- Robert Lowry (governor) (1831–1910), American politician from Mississippi
- Robert Lowry (hymn writer) (1826–1899), American professor of literature, Baptist minister and composer of gospel hymns
- Robert Lowry (Indiana) (1824–1904), American politician from Indiana
- Robert Lowry (writer) (1919–1994), American novelist, short story writer and publisher
- Robert Lowry, Baron Lowry (1919–1999), Lord Chief Justice of Northern Ireland and a Lord of Appeal in Ordinary
- Robert Lowry (Royal Navy officer) (1854–1920), British admiral
- Robert William Lowry (printer), printer
- Shane Lowry (footballer), Australian/Irish footballer
- Shane Lowry (golfer), Irish golfer
- Sylvanus Lowry, American politician
- Thomas Lowry, businessman
- Tommy Lowry, English footballer

=== Lowery ===
- Bill Lowery (politician) (born 1947), American politician from California
- Bill Lowery (record producer) (1924–2004), American music entrepreneur
- Clint Lowery (born 1971), guitarist of the rock band Sevendust
- Corey Lowery (born 1973), bass guitarist of Eye Empire, Saint Asonia, and Dark New Day
- Damon Lowery (born 1967), American basketball player
- David Lowery
- Evelyn G. Lowery (1925–2013), American civil rights activist and leader
- George H. Lowery Jr. (1913-1978), American ornithologist
- Finn Lowery (1990–2019), New Zealand water polo player
- Hugh Lowery (1892–1972), American football player
- Ian Lowery (1956–2001), English musician
- James Lowery, several people of that name
- Joan Lowery Nixon (1927-2003), American journalist and author
- John Lowery (born 1971), American guitarist with Marilyn Manson and Rob Zombie
- Joseph Lowery (1921-2020), American minister and civil rights leader
- Lillian M. Lowery, superintendent of the Maryland State Department of Education
- Mark Lowery (1957–2023), American politician from Arkansas
- Reuben Lowery (born 2002), American football player
- Robert Lowery (actor) (1913-1971), American actor
- Robert O. Lowery, New York City fire commissioner
- Savannah Lowery, American ballet dancer
- Terrell Lowery (born 1970), American baseball and basketball player
- Tom Lowery (born 1997), English footballer
- Tony Lowery (footballer) (born 1961), English footballer
- Tony Lowery (born 1969), American football player

== See also ==
- Laurie
- Lowrey (disambiguation)
