= Francis M. Wishart =

American military officer

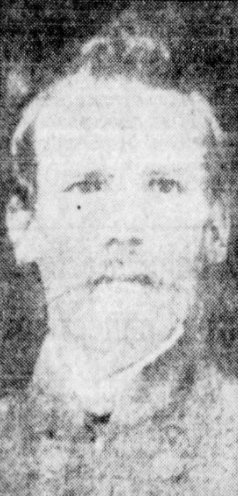
Wishart

Francis Marion Wishart (April 13, 1837 – May 1872) was an American military officer. He served with the 46th North Carolina Infantry Regiment of the Confederate States Army during the American Civil War. Wounded in combat, he left the war with rank of captain before returning to Robeson County, North Carolina to marry and open a store. He thereafter became involved in the Lowry War and in 1871 was made a colonel in charge of a county militia tasked with suppressing a gang of outlaws in the area. He was killed under disputed circumstances in a meeting with some of the outlaws in May 1872.

== Early life ==
Francis Marion Wishart was born on April 13, 1837. He was the third son of Eli and Marry Ann Strong Wishart. Dubbed "Frank" by his friends, Wishart was raised in an impoverished white community in eastern Robeson County, North Carolina, United States. His father was an appointed squire on the county court and at one time led the county militia.

== Military career ==
=== Civil War ===
Following the outbreak of the American Civil War, Wishart joined the 12th Regiment, North Carolina Infantry, Confederate States Army. He later served with the 46th North Carolina Infantry Regiment. Wishart rose to the rank of first lieutenant with Company A and frequently led the regiment's skirmishing line. On May 5, 1864, during the Battle of the Wilderness, he was severely wounded by gunfire while leading skirmishers through a thicket. Following the battle he was promoted to the rank of captain and given charge of Company B to replace a fallen officer, a capacity in which he served until the end of the war. Wishart subsequently returned to Robeson County and, like many other poor whites in the area during the Reconstruction era, he joined the Republican Party. He married Lydia Pittman on January 11, 1866 in Lumberton and fathered three children with her. The couple established a store in Shoe Heel in 1870.

=== Lowry War ===
At the time Wishart returned to Robeson County, the area was wracked by the Lowry War, a conflict between a gang of mostly-Lumbee outlaws led by Henry Berry Lowry and local authorities. Unlike most other local Republicans, who feared the political consequences of alienating the Lumbee community, Wishart supported active efforts to suppress the gang and in April 1871 joined 10 other men in a "compact" to kill the gang members. The compact disbanded in June after a lack of success in achieving their goal, but Wishart was commissioned by North Carolina Governor Tod Robinson Caldwell with the rank of captain—elevated to colonel by the end of the year—to lead the county militia in suppressing the Lowry Gang. Like his more conservative-leaning predecessors, he believed an effective campaign against the gang required the authorities' intervention in Scuffletown—the heart of the Lumbee community—and suppression of their supporters there, not just direct action against the outlaws. Unlike the other local authorities, he generally sought warrants for searches and arrests of suspects and attempted to instill discipline in the militia.

Wishart planned a campaign to suppress the Lowry Gang for July, the largest-ever concerted effort to capture them. He called upon Robeson's 15 townships to provide 10 men each, ultimately raising a militia of 117 men. The force was divided into smaller detachments ranging from 3–25 men, known as "township companies". Wishart sent scouts into the Scuffletown area to gather intelligence and drew a detailed map of the region, labeling small footpaths in the swamps and appending the names of the local inhabitants to their residences. He also studied Saunders' reports on the gang's behaviors. Despite this refined strategy, the gang continued to elude their pursuers. He instructed his pregnant wife to take their two children to Whiteville to avoid possible retaliation from the gang.

Wishart eventually settled on arresting the outlaws' wives, who up to that point had been largely ignored by the authorities and had lived their lives publicly. On 10 July, he dispatched the township detachments to simultaneously arrest the wives and some other prominent Lumbees before they could be warned. He accompanied the Smith's Township company as it arrested Rhoda Strong Lowry—the gang leader's wife—and another woman. As the unit returned to Wishart's headquarters at the village of Buie's Store, the Lowry Gang ambushed it from a blind. One militiaman was immediately killed, two others were mortally wounded, and three more were injured. Surprised by the attack, the militia did not mount an assault on the gang's position. The gang then moved out of the woods a few hundred yards down the railway and began cheering and firing their long range guns. Fearing that they were trying to provoke the militia into a pursuit that would give the hostages an opportunity to escape, Wishart refused to attack them and moved the women into his headquarters under heavy guard. The gang later retreated to the Lumber River.

By the end of the day, Wishart's militia had captured four wives of known outlaws and three other persons. They were detained under warrants accusing them of "aiding and abetting the outlaws" and incarcerated in the Lumberton jail. The next few days remained quiet as the militia gathered its strength. On the morning of July 14, Henry Berry Lowry and some of his gang members confronted a local family. Lowry made a verbal threat to local white women and had the family dictate a note for the county sheriff, demanding the release of their wives by Monday morning or else "the Bloodiest times will be here that ever was before—the life of every man will be in Jeopardy".

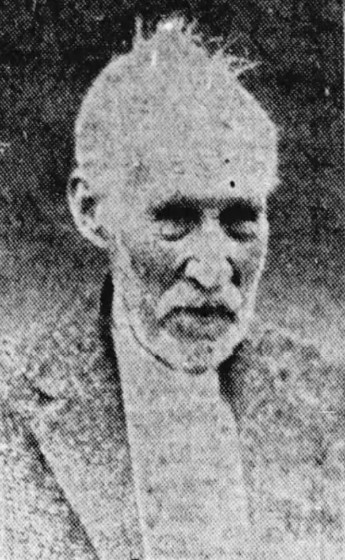
Wishart's younger brother, Aladon Strong (pictured), helped fight the outlaws after Wishart's death

Lowry's threat concerning the women generated panic throughout Robeson County. The white community was worried that Wishart's recruitment for his militia would deprive the white women of protection; many men avoided his summons. As a result, Wishart struggled to maintain a cohesive force. On the Monday of July 17, the day the gang's ultimatum expired, they murdered two men. Concerned about the situation, a group of elderly citizens went into Lumberton and met with the sheriff and the county commissioners. The group agreed that it would be best to release the wives, and did so the following day. Wishart was not consulted and was outraged by their decision.

By May 1872, the only active Lowry Gang members were Andrew Strong and Tom and Steve Lowry, the rest having either died or disappeared. On May 2, Wishart agreed to meet Steve and Andrew in attempt to broker a compromise involving the outlaws' departure from the area. According to historians Adolph Dial and David K. Eliades, the meeting ended with both parties agreeing to meet again near Lebanon Presbyterian Church several days later, and Wishart was shot dead then. According to historian W. McKee Evans, Wishart was killed at the meeting on May 2. Wishart's wife also recorded his date of death as May 2, 1872. The Wilmington Journal reported that several gunshots were heard in the area around midday, and at about 4:00 p.m. a passerby found Wishart's body riddled with buckshot lying in the nearby road. Lumbee oral history maintains that Wishart was killed by Andrew after he attempted to draw a concealed revolver and shoot Steve, but the actual circumstances of his death remain unclear. His body was buried in a family plot in Lumberton on May 4.

Wishart's death led to renewed efforts to suppress the outlaws; Aladon Strong Wishart and Robert Evander Wishart—the late colonel's respective younger brother and half-brother—reorganized the remnants of the county militia to launch a new search for the outlaws. They successfully killed Tom Lowry, while Strong was shot by a storekeeper and Steve was tracked down and killed by bounty hunters in 1874.

== Works cited ==
- Clark, Walter, ed. (1901). Histories of the several regiments and battalions from North Carolina, in the great war 1861–'65. Raleigh: E.M. Uzzell.
- Dial, Adolph L.; Eliades, David K. (1996). The Only Land I Know: A History of the Lumbee Indians (1st Syracuse University Press ed.). Syracuse: Syracuse University Press. ISBN 9780815603603.
- Evans, William McKee (1971). To Die Game: The Story of the Lowry Band, Indian Guerillas of Reconstruction. Baton Rouge: Louisiana State University Press. ISBN 9780807108161.
