= Lowry War =

Post-American Civil War conflict in North Carolina

- Part of the American Civil War and the Reconstruction era
- Wishart brothers with dead Lowry Gang member Tom Lowry, c. 1872
Date	1864 – February 1874
Location	Robeson County, North Carolina and surrounding area
Result	Lowry Gang disbanded

Belligerents
1864–1865: Confederate States of America: North Carolina; 1865–1874: United States: North Carolina; Vigilantes; Bounty hunters	Lowry Gang

Commanders and leaders
James Brantly Harris †; Owen Clinton Norment †; Evan Thomas; Roderick McMillan; Francis M. Wishart †	Henry Berry Lowry (MIA)

Strength
	6–30

Casualties and losses
22 killed	1 executed 5 killed 1 missing 2 arrested and released

The Lowry War or Lowrie War (Note: During the 1800s there was no common convention for the spelling of this last name. It was thus variously styled as Lowry, Lowrie, Lowrey, and Lowery.) was a conflict that took place in and around Robeson County, North Carolina, United States, from 1864 to 1874 between a group of mostly Native American outlaws and civil local, state, and federal authorities. The conflict is named for Henry Berry Lowry, a Lumbee who led a gang which robbed area farms and killed public officials who pursued them.

Banditry in Robeson County emerged during the later stages of the American Civil War, as free people of color hid in local swamps to avoid being conscripted for labor to support the war effort and stole food to survive. In 1864 and 1865 local Confederate officials came into conflict with the prominent Lumbee Lowry family, and two of the former were murdered. A Confederate Home Guard detachment subsequently executed two Lowrys for alleged possession of stolen goods and arrested Henry Berry Lowry on murder charges. He later broke out of jail and avoided the authorities by hiding in swamps with a group of associates which became known as the Lowry Gang. The gang was a somewhat fluid group of American Indian, white, and black men, but many of its predominant members had kinship ties to Lowry. New public officials brought in during Reconstruction initially sought a peaceful solution to the problem, but this ended after the gang killed a former sheriff during a robbery in 1868.

Over the following years the gang committed robberies, often targeting plantations. Declared outlaws by the state government, they were pursued by posses and county militiamen, typically eluding them in swamps and killing some of their pursuers. Some gang members were captured but escaped detention. The state ultimately placed large bounties on the core gang members, with a reward of $12,000 being offered for the capture or killing of Lowry. Elements of the 4th Regiment U.S. Artillery were dispatched on several occasions to assist the local authorities. Following a major robbery in Lumberton in February 1872, Lowry disappeared, and over the next two years bounty hunters tracked down the remaining active gang members. Over the course of the conflict, the Lowry Gang was implicated in the deaths of 22 people, while one of its members was arrested and executed and several others killed. The affair attracted significant regional and national media attention. His fate still unknown, Lowry became a folk hero for the Lumbee people.

== Background ==
The Lumbee people in southeastern North Carolina originated from various Native American groups. Their identity was rooted in kinship and shared location. Through intermarriage, they acquired some white and black ancestry. Not viewed as Native Americans by North Carolina until the 1880s, they were generally dubbed "mulattos" by locals and in federal documents throughout the mid-1800s.

In 1835 the Constitution of North Carolina classified the eastern Carolina Native Americans as "free persons of color". While having previously enjoyed the same political rights as white people, the Lumbees were disenfranchised by the new constitution. In 1840 the North Carolina General Assembly passed a law prohibiting free nonwhites from bearing arms without a license from the Court of Pleas and Quarter Sessions in their county. In 1853 the North Carolina Supreme Court affirmed the legality of the law in its ruling for State v. Noel Locklear, involving the case of a man convicted of unlawful possession of a firearm. White farmers in Robeson County also sought ways to obtain Lumbees' land or labor. According to Lumbee oral tradition, the "tied mule" incidents were emblematic of this. In these scenarios, a farmer would tie his mule on a Lumbee's land and release some of his cattle there, before bringing local authorities to the scene to accuse the Lumbee landowner of theft. Doubtful of a fair trial in the courts, a Lumbee would settle with the farmer by either offering him a portion of land or free labor. The legal discrimination and exploitative practices heightened racial tensions in the area.

The Lumbee people were initially ambivalent about the outbreak of the American Civil War. Some men enlisted in the Confederate States Army, though it is unknown whether they were accepted as recognised Native Americans or passed as white. In 1863, Confederate authorities began conscripting the Lumbees for labor along the coast, especially at Fort Fisher. The Lumbees were usually tasked to either construct batteries or grind salt. Most found the work dangerous and monotonous, and the conditions at the labor camps poor. Many consequently fled into the swamps of Robeson County to avoid conscription. Though some Lumbee still sought to serve in the army during this time, by late 1863 most had concluded that the Confederacy was an oppressive regime. This change in attitudes was brought on by their contact with Union prisoner-of-war escapees from the Florence Stockade, 60 miles (97 km) away in South Carolina. Lumbees became increasingly willing to help the Union soldiers escape and avoid recapture. As time progressed some of the swamp deserters—including Lumbees, blacks, and Union soldiers—formed bands to raid and steal from area farms, though this was mostly out of a desire to survive and had little to do with challenging the Confederacy. After Union troops led by General William Tecumseh Sherman entered North Carolina, the Union escapees left to join them, and the bands became predominantly Native American.

== Lowry family and the Home Guard ==
=== Murders of James P. Barnes and James Brantly Harris ===
Allen Lowry was a respected, successful Lumbee farmer. He and his wife, Mary, had twelve children, four of whom hid as a band in the swamps to avoid labor conscription. On at least one occasion they assisted Union escapees. In 1864 wealthy planter and Confederate postmaster James P. Barnes accused some of Lowry's sons of stealing two of his hogs and butchering them to feed Union escapees. He ordered the Lowry family to stay off his land under threat of being shot. It remains unknown whether some of the Lowry sons actually stole the hogs or whether Barnes falsely accused them with ulterior motives. On December 21, 1864, Barnes was ambushed and shot as he made his way to the Clay Valley Post Office. His screams drew the attention of several neighbors and slaves, and shortly before he died he accused William and Henry Berry Lowry, two sons of Allen, of committing the attack.

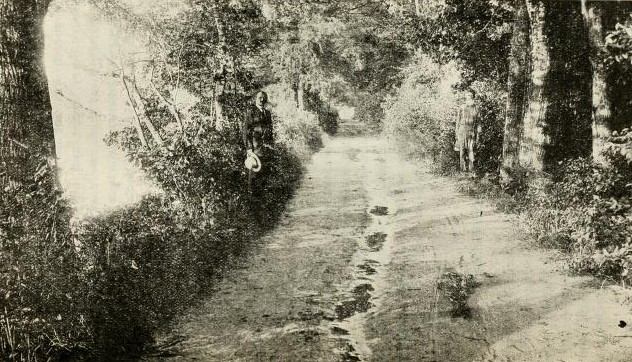
Site of the murder of James P. Barnes, pictured c. 1909

The Native Americans' aid to the Union escapees, their attempts to dodge labor conscription, and the murder of Barnes drew the attention of the Confederate Home Guard, a paramilitary force tasked with maintaining law and order in the South during the war. One prominent officer of the Home Guard in Robeson County was James Brantly Harris. He was a white man who had sold liquor to Native Americans before the war but upon its outbreak was tasked by the Home Guard with tracking down deserters, escapees, and maintaining order in Scuffletown, the center of the Native American community in Robeson County. (Note: "Scuffletown" was a pejorative name given to the community by white Robesonians. It was also known as "the Settlement". The actual location of Scuffletown is disputed. Some scholars believe it was in the vicinity of the later town of Pembroke while others place it at Moss Neck. Historians Adolph L. Dial and David K. Eliades believed that it was a mobile community.) Lumbee oral histories portray him as hot-tempered and brutal. During the war he became attracted to a young Lumbee woman, provoking the ire of her boyfriend. The boyfriend stated he would kill Harris if he interacted with his girlfriend again, leading Harris to try to kill the man in a night ambush. He ended up shooting and killing the man's brother, Jarman, a nephew of Allen Lowry.

Though local authorities ignored the killing, Harris became fearful that members of the Lowry family might attempt to attack him in revenge for the death of Jarman. Two of Jarman's brothers were working at Fort Fisher (Harris had earlier conscripted them) but, several weeks after the killing, they were granted leave and returned to Robeson County to visit their parents. To preempt any attempts at vengeance, Harris led a Home Guard unit in arresting the brothers on charges of desertion and said he would transport them to the Moss Neck rail depot where they could be taken by train back to Fort Fisher. On the way he dismissed his fellow guardsmen, telling them he could manage the two handcuffed prisoners by himself. Once they were alone, Harris beat them to death, later claiming that they had attacked him and that he acted in self-defense. An inquest was conducted and a warrant for Harris' arrest was issued. On January 15, 1865, he was shot and killed while riding his buggy, and his body disposed of either in a nearby well or an unmarked grave. Henry Berry Lowry and some of his associates were suspected of the killing.

=== Executions of Allen and William Lowry ===
Fearing Harris' death would lead to retaliation from the Home Guard, local Lumbees began preparing for violence. Short on food and weapons, they began stealing from white-owned farms and plantations. Firearms and ammunition intended for the guard was stolen from the courthouse in Lumberton. White citizens were infuriated by the decline in law and order, and the Home Guard suspected that the Lowry family was largely responsible. On March 3, a detachment of the Home Guard under Captain Hugh McGreggor arrested Allen and Mary Lowry, three of their sons—William, Calvin, and Sinclair—some female relatives, and their Lumbee neighbor, George Dial. They also seized some of Allen's belongings. They brought them to the property of Robert McKenzie. The women were locked in the smokehouse while the men were interrogated outside facing accusations of "highway robbery", aiding Confederate deserters and Union escapees, stockpiling weapons, and having dodged labor conscription. The men denied the accusations and Williams was wounded after trying to escape. The guardsmen then moved them into the smokehouse and held a kangaroo court to determine their culpability in the alleged crimes, selecting a jury from among their own ranks.

The tribunal found Allen and William guilty of possessing stolen goods on their farm (Lumbee oral tradition holds that these goods were planted to frame them) and ruled that William had been positively identified during a robbery. They were taken back to their farm and executed by firing squad. According to one account, Henry Berry hid in the woods nearby and witnessed this execution. The next day the guardsmen forced Calvin Lowry and Dial to show them where Union soldiers were hiding. Dial led them to a small cave, but, to the guardsmen's frustration, the two men largely did not know where to find escapees. Dial and the Lowry family members were released the following day under the threat that they would be punished for any "mischief" that occurred in the area. On March 9 Union troops entered Robeson County and looted, but quickly moved on. The Home Guard was briefly disrupted by this incursion, but thereafter resumed investigating the Lowry family. In April a Home Guard detachment searched Sinclair's farm for an alleged stockpile of weapons and interrogated Mary Lowry, but found nothing.

The situation in Robeson County calmed with the Union victory at the end of the Civil War, as locals focused on rebuilding their livelihoods. Local government in Robeson mostly continued as it had during the war, with rich white men of prominence dominating public offices, especially the justices of the peace who constituted the county court. The Home Guard was formally dissolved but was replaced by a similar institution, the Police Guard. An investigation into the executions of Allen and William was later conducted in 1867 at the impetus of Freedmen's Bureau agent William Birnie, but no charges were brought against the Home Guard.

=== Arrest of Henry Berry Lowry ===
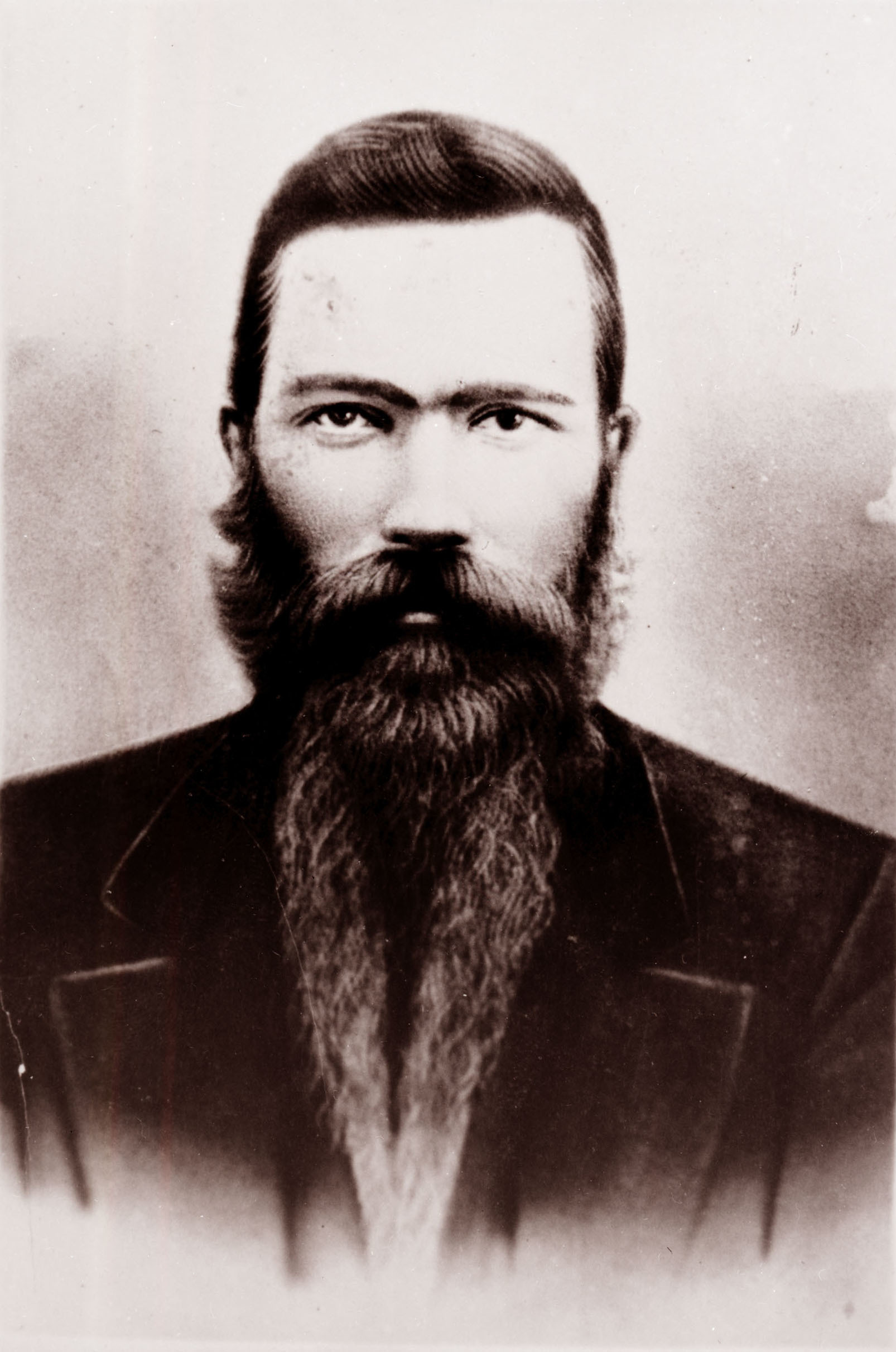
This portrait is widely identified as one of Henry Berry Lowry, though some persons—including some descendants of Lowry—believe it portrays a different person.

On December 7, 1865, Henry Berry Lowry married his cousin, Rhoda Strong. During the wedding reception, a company of the Police Guard under Lieutenant A. J. McNair arrived and arrested Lowry. The following day a warrant was crafted accusing him of murdering James Barnes. He was initially held in the Lumberton jail but, since it had been damaged by Union troops, the authorities decided to move him to the Columbus County jail, approximately 30 miles (48 km) away in Whiteville. Lowry later escaped from the Whiteville jail, the first person to ever do so. How he achieved this is not clear, though Lumbee oral tradition maintains that he cut his way through prison bars with a file smuggled in by his wife in a cake. He then returned to Scuffletown and reunited with his wife.

== Period of outlawry ==
=== The Lowry Gang ===
Following the jailbreak, the Robeson County Court issued at least 35 capias warrants against Lowry for sheriffs in the North Carolina-South Carolina border region. North Carolina Governor Jonathan Worth also offered a $300 reward for Lowry's capture. He avoided the authorities by hiding in swamps with a group of associates which became known as the Lowry Gang or Lowry Band. (Note: The nickname "Lowry Gang" was a label accorded to its members by others; there is no evidence the group ever tried to name itself.) Although a somewhat fluid band at times numbering 20–30 men, the gang usually operated with six to eight men. Its most consistent members included Henry Berry; Steve and Tom Lowry, his two older brothers; two of his cousins, Calvin and Henderson Oxendine; two of his brothers-in-law, Andrew and Boss Strong; and two other Indians, John Dial (son of George Dial) and William Chavis. There were also two black men, George Applewhite and Eli Ewin (sometimes called Shoemaker John), and a white man, Zachariah T. McLauchlin. They joined at different times for various reasons, but all bore resentment against the local authorities. They usually stayed in improvised shelters in Back Swamp, a ten-mile long stretch of sparsely-traveled land near Allen Lowry's homestead. Throughout 1866 and 1867 the gang conducted raids "in retaliation" for previous wrongs inflicted upon them, but no people were killed. In response to their activities, the General Assembly amended the state outlawry statutes, requiring all magistrates to issue a proclamation of outlawry against any accused felon if an affidavit presented to them demonstrated that the accused had evaded arrest. The statute allowed any citizen to kill the accused felon if the individual refused to surrender after being so ordered.

=== Attempted truce ===
Following the passage of federal Reconstruction Acts in 1867, nonwhites in the South, both black freedmen and Robeson's Indians, were re-enfranchised. The following year the Republican Party won a majority of the vote in elections in Robeson, displacing planter families who had dominated county affairs. The party relied on the electoral support of black freedmen, Indians, and poor "Buckskin" (Note: This term referred to poor persons of Scottish descent, so called because of their reputation for wearing pants made of deer leather. A few from the more impoverished and rural areas of Robeson County rose to local positions of prominence.) whites. Republicans generally favored equal citizenship and civil rights for all persons regardless of race. The opposing Conservative faction encompassed a range of opinion but generally advocated for the withholding of certain rights from nonwhites and forcing blacks to work menial jobs.

The renewal of democratic institutions coincided with a relaxation of violence in the county, as many impoverished people hoped that their interests could be addressed through them. No armed robberies were reported in the county for nearly six months, and the members of the Lowry Gang kept a low profile. John Dial found work in a blacksmith shop while most others lived off of resources provided to them by family and friends. Henry Berry Lowry was reported to have shown some public support for the Republican Party. Republican officials were reluctant to take any action concerning the previous lawlessness in Robeson, since prosecuting former Home Guardsmen would harm their law and order campaign, while targeting the Lowry Gang would split their local base of support.

In October 1868, a group of about 30 armed men robbed a company store and several plantations in South Carolina. Several days later, the group robbed three plantations in Robeson County. These men were never positively identified, though historian William McKee Evans wrote, "it appears they were led by Henry Berry's men, who had grown restive at the ambiguous attitude of the government and the uncertainty of their own position." Soon thereafter, the new Republican Governor of North Carolina, William Woods Holden, received a written petition from over 50 Robesonians asking for him to declare Henry Berry Lowry and his gang outlaws. Holden issued a declaration of outlawry against Lowry and some of his associates on November 30. The proclamation divided the local Republican Party and threatened their hold on county politics. In attempt to broker a peaceful and less politically risky solution, two prominent local Republicans, Freedmens' Bureau agent Alfred Thomas and Robeson Sheriff Benjamin A. Howell, met with Lowry at his home to convince him to surrender. Thomas and Howell argued that he had a chance at a fair trial in the new Reconstruction court system. Lowry agreed to stand trial on the condition that he be given quality treatment and be assured of his safety.

Being promised of these things, Lowry was willfully taken to Lumberton and housed in the rebuilt jail. Some white Robesonians were angered by his privileged treatment, and there were rumors of threats to remove him from his cell and drown him in the Lumber River. Hearing of these threats, Lowry decided to escape. On the evening of December 12, 1868 he menaced the jailer with a knife and revolver as the latter served dinner. After threatening to kill the jailer if he left to call for help, Lowry walked out of the building down to the river. He moved along the bank and stole some crackers from a house before crossing a bridge out of the city.

=== Murders of Reuben King and Owen Clinton Norment ===
Shortly after the second jailbreak, the Lowry Gang decided to target Reuben King. King was the former sheriff of Robeson who had been displaced in an 1868 election by Howell, but many white locals considered the contest fraudulent and still accorded King authority. The Lowry Gang decided to rob him since he was reportedly wealthy and had a reputation for discriminating against racial minorities. He had also made threats against the band. On the night of January 23, 1869, the gang entered King's home while he spoke with a neighbor, S. E. Ward. Henry Lowry confronted King and demanded money, leading the former sheriff to lunge for his gun. In the ensuing scuffle Lowry's weapon fired into the floor. Applewhite then shot King in the back with a revolver, mortally wounding him, while Dial shot and wounded Ward. The gang recovered $155 in cash and $20 in gold from the house.

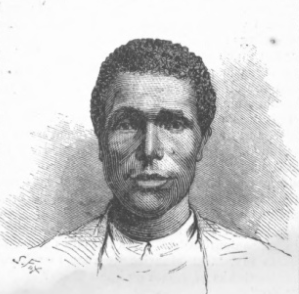
George Applewhite (depicted) shot Reuben King during a robbery

King's murder ended all efforts by Republican officials to negotiate with Lowry and renewed the resolve of the authorities to stop his gang. Owen Clinton Norment, a member of a prominent Robeson family, decided to cooperate with the Republican Reconstruction government to regain influence and was appointed captain of the Police Guard. He pursued the Lowry Gang, but was sometimes hampered by a lack of intelligence. In one instance he was reported to have attended a religious service at Black Swamp Church and to have found Lowry there. Lowry had expected this and was armed, while Norment was not; the two reportedly exchanged some antagonistic conversation but Lowry left without incident. Between March and April, a state detective briefly investigated the gang. Also in 1869, John Saunders, a detective from Boston, came to Robeson County at the behest of the Sheriff of New Hanover County, J. W. Schenck, with the intent of disguising himself as a Radical Republican carpetbagger who wanted to teach the children in Scuffletown how to read and write. After gaining the Indians' trust, he would try and gather intelligence from them about the Lowry Gang, so he could turn them over to the authorities and secure a reward for himself and Schenck. He later reported to the authorities that some gang members would stop at their relatives' homes on short visits between forays.

By the autumn of 1869, Norment's men had captured eight members of the Lowry Gang—six Indians and two blacks. Among those captured were George Applewhite, Steve Lowry, John Dial, (Note: Dial was arrested by a state detective.) and Eli Ewin. The latter two agreed to turn state's evidence. The trial of those captured for the murder of King was scheduled for the 1870 spring term in the Robeson County Superior Court. The gang's leader and Boss Strong, as well as some other less prominent members, remained at large. Raids continued throughout the winter, despite the intensified efforts of local authorities. Norment also arrested Zachariah T. McLauchlin on suspicion of robbery, but he escaped custody. A state detective dispatched from New Bern arrived in January 1870 and briefly collaborated with Howell in attempting to lure the gang out of hiding without success.

Lowry decided to attack Norment in revenge for his crackdown. On the evening of March 19, 1870, he and his band went to the Norment Plantation. Norment was sitting with his wife when he heard a strange noise and decided to step outside. He was shot, and his wife pulled him inside, locked the door, and handed him his rifle. Other members of the family sent for help and contacted a doctor, who rode to the plantation in his buggy. A mile away from his destination, the doctor's mule was shot, and he jumped from the buggy and proceeded to the house on foot, leaving his medical supplies behind. Norment died the following day. Three other raids were reported in the county that night. The murder of Norment provoked the ire of his brothers-in-law, John and A. C. Bridgers, so the gang resolved to kill them as well. They went to their plantation one evening and attempted to coax them outside by making loud noises. This failed, and with the outlaws unable to enter the home, they shot some of the Bridgers' dairy cattle and departed.

=== King murder trial and escape from Lumberton and Wilmington jails ===
On April 1, 1870, Applewhite and Steve Lowry were tried for the murder of King. Due to tensions in Lumberton, proceedings were conducted in Whiteville. Statements made by Dial were used as evidence against them, though when testifying in court he said he had been coerced into confessing. Regardless, Applewhite and Lowry were found guilty and sentenced to be hanged. In the meantime, some of the gang members detained in Lumberton escaped from the jail there after a woman, probably Rhoda Strong, smuggled them an auger. Ewin was among those who broke out, and thereafter he disappeared. Those who remained in the possession of the authorities were transferred to the more secure brick jail in Wilmington, where Calvin and Henderson Oxendine were already being held. The gang members were held together in a maximum security cell, but managed to escape early on the morning of June 13.

Lumbee oral tradition maintains that Rhoda Strong walked to Wilmington from Scuffletown and distracted the guards with "womanly charms" while an accomplice slipped the gang members tools to break out. A white prisoner later testified that a woman had some days before distracted the guards with an inquiry of another prisoner while Steve Lowry hauled tools tied by a string through a window. By his account, the gang members fashioned a lock pick out of one of the tools, allowing them to leave their cell at will, and this let Applewhite find an exterior wall which he chiseled through when the guards were not around. On the morning of their escape, the outlaws left their cell when the guard on duty went downstairs to speak with a colleague, climbed through the hole Applewhite had carved, and descended to the ground with a rope fashioned out of blankets. All of the members fled except Calvin, who declared that he was innocent of any crime and sought to be cleared in court. The other gang members slowly made their way back to Robeson County over the course of a month, hiding in the wilderness to avoid detection. Once they returned they restarted their raids.

Meanwhile, elections were held in 1870, resulting in many Republican losses across North Carolina. In Robeson County, Howell won re-election to the office of sheriff but was unable to raise the money to post his official bond. The courts thus awarded the office to a Conservative and former member of the Home Guard, Roderick McMillan. To incentivize capture of the gang members, the now Conservative-dominated General Assembly voted during its 1870/1871 session to offer $2,000 each for the "delivery, dead or alive" of Henry, Tom and Steve Lowry; Henderson Oxendine, George Applewhite, and Boss Strong to the authorities. The Robeson County commissioners also offered several hundred additional dollars in bounties. The high amounts of money attracted many bounty hunters to Robeson, drawing interest from people as far away as New York City. In turn, the gang offered $1,000 for the body of county commissioner Angus McLean.

=== Guerrilla war ===
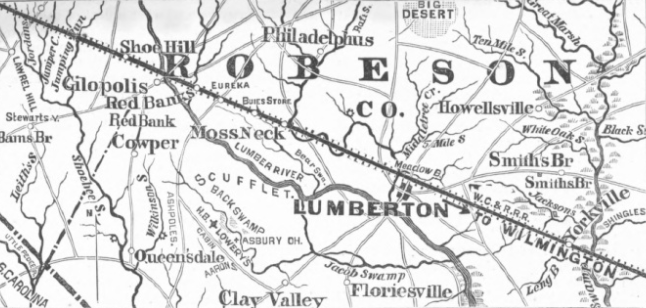
1872 map of central Robeson County

On October 3, 1870, the Lowry Gang, including a dozen white members, stole large quantities of brandy from Angus Leach's still and destroyed what they could not cart away. Leach protested and was struck with the butt of a gun. A black man who attempted to help him was whipped with a trace and had his ears cut with a knife. The following day, Leach's neighbors formed a posse to track down the gang. The posse found 15 gang members at Applewhite's home between Plummer's Station and Red Banks, leading to a firefight and pursuit. Applewhite, Boss Strong, and Henderson Oxendine were wounded in the fighting, while one member of the posse, Steve Davis, was killed while confronting the gang at the edge of a field. The band retreated into Long Swamp, which was subsequently surrounded by over 150 armed men. Sheriff McMillan was wary of pursuing the outlaws into the thicket and requested that artillery be sent to flush them out, but in the meantime the gang had escaped and was reported 10 miles (16 km) away from the swamp.

Frustrated by their lack of success, the Police Guard decided to target some of the Indians they believed were helping the gang. On October 5, a detachment of guardsmen under Captain Murdock McLean arrested Andrew Strong and Malcolm Sanderson, accusing them of spying for the band. The guardsmen took them to the mill pond of William C. McNeil where an execution by firing squad was prepared at the direction of John Taylor, a wealthy planter, former member of the Home Guard, and a known racist. Strong managed to work himself free of the rope tying him and ran into Bear Swamp. The guardsmen then shot Sanderson and dumped his body in the mill race. Strong subsequently joined the Lowry Gang, while word spread among the Indian community that Taylor had ordered Sanderson's death. A justice of the peace indicted Taylor for murder, but he was released on bond. Fearing his life was in danger, he offered Sanderson's family money as compensation for the death. After they indicated their lack of interest, he made preparations to leave Robeson County, but remained to oversee the selling of his property.

Meanwhile, the Lowry Gang grew suspicious of John Saunders. Saunders had established contact with Henry Berry Lowry and told him he would help the gang escape westward, reportedly with the secret intention of having them arrested in South Carolina or Georgia, far away from their homeland. The gang surveilled Saunders and realized he had made connections with the family of William C. McNeil, in which John Taylor had married. Fearing that he was a spy, they elected to not show up at a rendezvous he planned at a camp near Moss Neck on November 19 for their "migration" out of the state. With their failure to appear, Saunders requested that some of the McNeil sons meet him at the camp. The gang kept watch on the camp and captured the McNeils and Saunders. They released the former and took Saunders to their own camp in Back Swamp. Once there they debated his fate, though Henry and Steve Lowry were in favor of killing him and eventually won their argument. The gang allowed Saunders to pen a letter to his wife before Steve shot him. Andrew Strong buried him and mailed his letter.

In early November county authorities searched the farm belonging to the mother of Zachariah T. McLauchlin and found some property believed to have been stolen by the Lowry Gang. As a result, he was declared an outlaw and a $400 bounty was offered for his capture, dead or alive. On December 16 McLauchlin spent the evening drinking in the company of another young white man, Henry Biggs. Over the course of the night he drunkenly demanded Biggs join the gang or he would kill him. Fearful of McLauchlin, Biggs waited until he had fallen asleep, and then shot him with his own pistol. Biggs proceeded to Lumberton to report the killing, led authorities to the body, collected a $400 bounty, and left the county. The Lowry Gang later learned that Biggs had found work at a lumber mill in Abbottsburg, Bladen County. To avenge McLauchlin's death, they attempted a raid, but were spotted near the county line. A posse was raised to stop the gang and Biggs escaped.

=== Deployment of federal troops ===
Governor Holden decided that there was a state of war in Robeson, and at his request federal troops under Captain Evan Thomas were dispatched to "aid the civil authority". Company A of the 4th Regiment U.S. Artillery arrived in Lumberton on November 22, 1870. Thomas immediately headed for Scuffletown to find the Lowry Gang. He reported searching "the whole country for 30 miles" but found nothing. Thomas wrote to General Irvin McDowell to ask for permission to declare martial law to arrest Lowry family members, but the general declined and ordered him to serve "under the direction of the civil authority, and as a part of its posse." Thus denied, Thomas posted his men at various stations along the Wilmington, Charlotte and Rutherford Railroad and the situation in the county calmed, the Lowry Band seemingly wary of engaging the troops. The Wilmington, Charlotte and Rutherford Railroad Company, though it shuttled federal troops, tried to keep armed bounty hunters off of its trains and strived for neutrality in the overall conflict, not seeking to become a target of the outlaws. Some of its black crew members were reported to have warned Scuffletown when troops were on board.

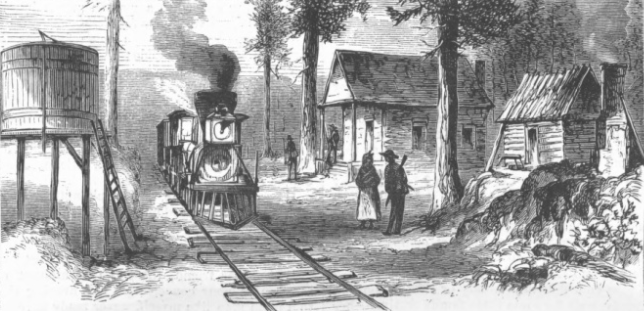
Rail depot at Moss Neck

Violence resumed on January 14, 1871. Several hundred yards away from the federal encampment at the Moss Neck rail depot, Henry Berry Lowry, accompanied by Boss Strong, rose from an embankment on the side of a road and shot John Taylor through the head. Lowry then ran to the body, took $50 and ran with Strong into a nearby swamp. A sergeant and several enlisted men gave chase but quickly lost sight of him. Thomas' company, accompanied by Sheriff McMillan and a posse, resumed the pursuit but were unsuccessful.

Also that month, a group of bounty hunters stopped a buggy on Old Stage Road, 12 miles (19 km) south of Fayetteville, heading towards Lumberton. They asked the two Indian occupants to identify themselves and state their business. One declared that he was Sinclair Locklear and the other was his brother John, and that they were heading to South Carolina to do farm work. The bounty hunters initially let the buggy proceed before asking them to stop again. This time, Locklear jumped out armed, but was quickly subdued. The other man lashed the horse and sped away in the buggy. The bounty hunters later found it abandoned on the side of the road, with the man having taken the horse and going into the woods. On Locklear's person and in the buggy the bounty hunters found $83 and "3 double-barreled guns and 4 repeating pistols". Locklear was jailed on a robbery charge and "being suspicioned as one of the [...] outlaws." A local newspaper reported that the escaped man was believed to have been Henry Berry Lowry.

On February 17, McMillan raised a posse to search for the Lowry Gang. The sheriff led one large group to the swamps near Scuffletown. A reported sighting of the band four miles (6.5 km) from Lumberton led them to return to the town, though by then the outlaws had disappeared. Another detachment, led by county coroner Robert Chaffin, entered Scuffletown and went to the home of a freedman and active Republican, Benjamin Bethea. Once there, the men debated executing him and some opposed to the idea left the scene. The rest took Bethea away on horseback. Members of the Lowry Gang later recovered his body, beaten and shot, from a swamp four miles away. The body was later turned over to Chaffin. Justice of the Peace James Sinclair issued arrest warrants for nine men believed to have been involved. A grand jury subsequently dismissed the charges, but Judge Daniel Lindsay Russell disagreed with the jury's findings and issued a bench warrant for the men. Surprised by this turn of events, the men fled the state, and Russell declared them outlaws.

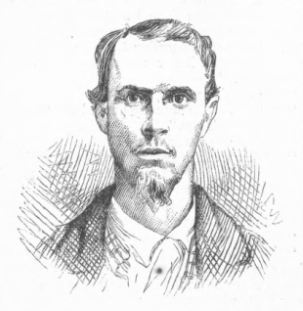
Henderson Oxendine (depicted) was the only member of the Lowry Gang to be executed by authorities.

On February 26, a posse captured Henderson Oxendine at Applewhite's home, and he was subsequently indicted for the murder of Steve Davis. He was placed under constant guard in the Lumberton jail by U.S. soldiers. The authorities quickly tried him and found him guilty; he was publicly hanged on March 17, the only Lowry Gang member to be formally executed. Henderson's brother, Calvin, was tried for the murder of King. After providing an alibi to demonstrate he was working outside of Robeson when King was killed, the jury acquitted him and he was freed.

Major Charles H. Morgan, commander of the Post of Raleigh, held jurisdiction over Thomas and the troops in Robeson County. He oversaw a brief investigation into the murder of Taylor before concluding that the army's priority should be to protect friends and family of the Lowry Gang from revenge inflicted by posses. He instructed Thomas to place himself in Scuffletown every time Sheriff McMillan formed a posse to pursue the gang and remain there until the posse had disbanded. He also sent 10 soldiers to Harper's Ferry, near where the gang members reportedly lived. This angered the local authorities, who considered the federal troops an impediment to their progress, and McMillan scaled down his pursuit of the band. Thomas' troops did little other than routine activities over the following months. Some soldiers searched Henry Berry Lowry's cabin and discovered a trap door in the floor which opened into a tunnel that led about 60 yards (55 m) away into a swamp. They subsequently dug it up.

Two of the men named in Russel's indictment, Faulk Floyde and Malcolm McNeill, unbothered by the proclamation of outlawry against them, quickly returned to Robeson County and joined with nine others in a "compact" to kill the Lowry Gang. Aware that the authorities' tactics of using large parties for short-term searches were deficient, they decided to stake out a home of one of the outlaw's families to catch them on a visit. On April 15, five members of the compact met at a store and decided to ambush Applewhite, believing he would return to his family home the following morning, a Sunday. They proceeded to the homestead and hid themselves in thicket. Applewhite approached his cabin in the afternoon of April 16 but, seeing the armed men, turned away to run. They shot him in the back and neck, but he returned fire and crawled into a nearby swamp for cover. Satisfied that Applewhite was mortally wounded and fearing the presence of other outlaws, the group departed and notified McMillan of the incident. He returned the following morning with a posse and the coroner, but Applewhite could not be located, and his children told the sheriff that he had survived. The posse then arrested Applewhite's brother-in-law, Forney Oxendine, on the accusation of possessing stolen property.

On April 26, McMillan led nine men to Henry Berry Lowry's cabin. Covertly advancing to the location, they found Boss Strong acting as a lookout, while Applewhite, still recovering from his wounds, was sitting in front of the house. Lowry was with his wife and three children inside. The posse fired a single shot at Strong, but it missed, and he dove for cover. He and Applewhite then crawled into the cabin and began firing at the posse through cracks in the walls. Feeling that they had the outlaws cornered but were not strong enough to flush them out of the building, McMillan took Frank McKay to go recruit others for their posse. Traveling up to the Buie's Store/Red Banks area, they enlisted four men to their cause. The sheriff sent them with McKay to the Lowry homestead while he took the train to Shoe Heel to gather more men.

At Lowry's cabin, the outlaws and the posse exchanged fire for some time until the former went silent. The posse figured that they had either run low on ammunition or were trying to bait a trap and continued to fire at the home. In reality, the outlaws and the Lowry family slipped out of a secret door on the south wall of the house (unguarded by the posse since it had no obvious exits) and went into Back Swamp. About 30 minutes later they encountered McKay's group and fired upon them, wounding two and killing one, Giles Inman. The outlaws escaped and later Lowry sent his apologies to Inman's father for killing his son. On April 29 the outlaws raided a plantation in Richmond County, stealing a cart full of corn and driving it to Scuffletown, where its contents were distributed to the locals. They then returned the cart and mules to the plantation. They acted similarly when they robbed the Argyle plantation, returning the wagon they used to cart away their goods. They also attempted to rob John McNair, who was reportedly rich, but upon finding that he only had $15 in his possession they returned his money.

Shortly after midnight on May 10, the Lowry Gang entered Lumberton and broke Tom Lowry and Forney Oxendine out of the county jail. The next morning Thomas conducted a fruitless search for the gang members. Feeling the troops would be more useful elsewhere, on May 17 Morgan ordered Thomas' men out of the county. The authorities were greatly demoralised by this point, and in June the "compact" of men who had ambushed Applewhite declared they were too exhausted to continue searching for the outlaws.

=== Wishart's campaign ===
With the attempts to suppress the Lowry Band failing, and the Conservative-led local posses frightening nonwhites in their searches, state authorities sought new leadership for their efforts. They ultimately recruited Francis M. Wishart to lead the locals. Wishart was a Buckskin Republican of modest origins who had served in the Confederate Army as an officer. Unlike most of his local Republican colleagues, he held little sympathy for the Lowry Gang and had worked with the earlier "compact". The governor granted him the rank of captain, later colonel, and tasked him with forming a new militia to suppress the outlaws. Like his more Conservative-leaning predecessors, he believed an effective campaign against the gang required the authorities' intervention in Scuffletown and suppression of their supporters there, not just direct action against the outlaws. However, he generally sought warrants for searches and arrests of suspects and attempted to instill discipline in the militia.

Wishart planned a campaign to suppress the Lowry Gang for July, the largest-ever concerted effort to capture them. He called upon Robeson's 15 townships to provide 10 men each, ultimately raising a militia of 117 men. The force was divided into smaller detachments ranging from 3–25 men, known as "township companies". Wishart sent scouts into the Scuffletown area to gather intelligence and drew a detailed map of the region, labeling small footpaths in the swamps and appending the names of the local inhabitants to their residences. He also studied Saunders' reports on the gang's behaviors. Despite this refined strategy, the gang continued to elude their pursuers.

Wishart eventually settled on arresting the outlaws' wives, who up to that point had been largely ignored by the authorities and had lived their lives publicly. Evans speculated that the purpose of this was to try to bait the gang into mounting a rescue attempt, like the May jailbreak, except that the militia could confront them in an open fight in which they would be destroyed. On 10 July, Wishart dispatched the township detachments to simultaneously arrest the wives and some other prominent Indians before they could be warned. He accompanied the Smith's Township company as it arrested Rhoda Strong and Applewhite's wife. As the unit returned to Wishart's headquarters at the village of Buie's Store, the Lowry Gang ambushed it from a blind. One militiaman was immediately killed, two others were mortally wounded, and three more were injured. Surprised by the attack, the militia did not mount an assault on the gang's position. The gang then moved out of the woods a few hundred yards down the railway and began cheering and firing their long range guns. Fearing that they were trying to provoke the militia into a pursuit that would give the hostages an opportunity to escape, Wishart refused to attack them and moved the women into his headquarters under heavy guard. The gang later retreated to the Lumber River.

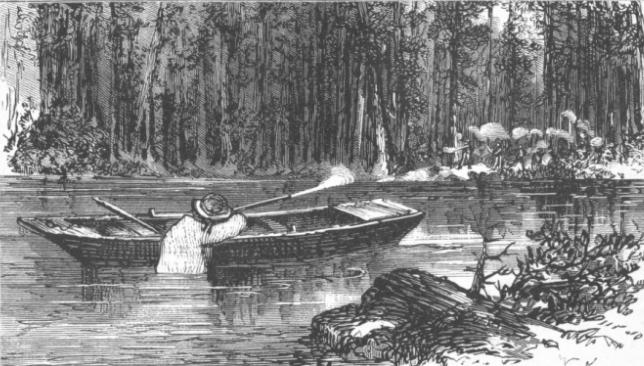
Firefight at Wire Grass Landing

Meanwhile, the combined Alfordsville and Thompson's Township detachments under Captain Charles McRae captured Flora Strong (Andrew's wife) and handed her over to other militiamen to be taken to Buie's Store. That evening, McRae's men stopped to rest at Wire Grass Landing on the banks of the Lumber River. While they were there, Henry Berry Lowry paddled by in a canoe. The militiamen recognized him and opened fire. Lowry jumped into the river and retrieved his rifle from the boat. Using it as a shield, he swam towards the landing while resting his gun over top of the craft, firing as he approached. He wounded two men before McRae ordered the militia to retreat.

By the end of the day, Wishart's militia had captured the wives of Henry Berry Lowry, Steve Lowry, Andrew Strong, and George Applewhite. They also captured Aaron Revels, Andre McMillan, and McMillan's wife. They were detained under warrants accusing them of "aiding and abetting the outlaws" and incarcerated in the Lumberton jail. The next few days remained quiet as the militia gathered its strength. On the morning of July 14, Henry Berry and Steve Lowry and Andrew and Boss Strong went to the plantation of John McNair and demanded to be served breakfast. The family complied, and when they were finished eating Henry Berry Lowry told McNair to tell the sheriff and county commissioners to release his wife from jail or he would "retaliate on the white women of Burnt Swamp Township". He then dictated a note he wanted delivered to Sheriff McMillan and the local leader of the Republican Party, demanding the release of the wives by Monday morning or else "the Bloodiest times will be here that ever was before—the life of every man will be in Jeopardy".

McMillan rebuffed the ultimatum but asked for assistance from the militias in Bladen and Columbus counties. He also wrote to Governor Tod Robinson Caldwell to ask for supplies and to appeal to the President of the United States for a "strong detachment" of federal troops. Major Morgan, writing to General McDowell, advised against this, saying he had tried to convince the county authorities to have one 20-man group continuously search for the Lowry Gang, but instead the Police Guard would search for the outlaws in three-day stints after a raid before dissolving, allowing them to escape. Morgan thought this showed the local authorities' lack of determination and believed they expected federal troops to do all the necessary work for them.

Lowry's threat concerning the white women in Burnt Swamp generated panic throughout Robeson County. The white community was worried that Wishart's recruitment for his militia would deprive the white women of protection; many men avoided his summons. As a result, Wishart struggled to maintain a cohesive force. On the Monday of July 17, the day the gang's ultimatum expired, the outlaw band ambushed Police Guardsman Murdoch McLean as he rode with his younger brother Hugh and a third associate, Archy McCallum, in a buggy towards Shoe Heel. Both McLeans were killed, while McCallum was wounded and managed to run way. The gang tied up the horse and sent a child to inform the McLean family of their sons' deaths. Sheriff McMillan gathered a posse of 150 men at the McLean home and set out after the outlaws, tracing them to the W. A. Sellers Plantation, but losing their trail after ascertaining that the group had crossed the Lumber River.

Concerned about the situation, a group of elderly citizens went into Lumberton and met with McMillan and the county commissioners. The group agreed that it would be best to release the wives. Wishart was not consulted and was outraged by their decision. On July 18, the wives were sent aboard a train and released at the village of Red Banks. A small federal force was sent to Robeson County during local elections to contain political violence in early August but left at the contests' conclusion. Governor Caldwell then requested that McDowell send troops to explicitly "assist" local authorities and on August 24 the general dispatched two companies of the 4th Regiment U.S. Artillery to Robeson. By the end of the summer many Robesonians had concluded that it was not worth the effort to suppress the gang and sought a truce.

The Lowry Gang contacted Wishart and asked him to connect them with North Carolina Adjutant-General John C. Gorman, who was accompanying the federal soldiers, to negotiate a deal. Gorman met them alone in a swamp, where they maintained they were not guilty of some of the crimes ascribed to them, and claimed they had always acted in self-defense. They assured Gorman that they would not attack any U.S. troops, but told him that since they were unable to find work they would continue taking food and supplies from local farmers. They also indicated to him that they would leave the country if permitted. Gorman told them that he lacked the power to settle to their terms, but had several more meetings with the gang. The North Carolina General Assembly refused to offer terms to the outlaws. The federal troops were withdrawn by October 15. Over the next few months little gang activity was reported in Robeson, aside from the theft of some meat from a plantation in December. Evans wrote, "Perhaps they felt that more extravagant foraging would spoil efforts that were being made to obtain for them pardons or safe conduct beyond the borders of the United States." In early February 1872, the General Assembly appropriated more money to increase the bounties on the outlaws, raising the total state bounty on Henry Berry Lowry to $12,000. Tom and Steve Lowry, Henderson Oxendine, George Applewhite, and Boss Strong were all accorded cumulative $6,000 bounties. Andrew Strong, being a newer member to the group and not the subject of any previous appropriations, was only worth $5,000.

=== Lumberton raid and disappearance of Henry Berry Lowry ===
"There can be no question that in every instance harm rather than good has been done, the presence of the troops causing the citizens to relax their efforts, by which alone the capture or extermination of this band of outlaws can be accomplished."

— Major Charles H. Morgan's reflection on the use of federal troops against the Lowry Gang

Early in the morning on February 16, 1872, the Lowry Gang broke the apparent peace in the county by staging a raid on Lumberton. They stole a horse and wagon from a livery before breaking into the Pope and McLeod store and stealing the iron safe inside. The safe contained $22,000, much of it reportedly belonging to various citizens, as the town had no bank. They also seized about $1,000 worth of merchandise from the establishment. The gang then stole the safe from the sheriff's office, but, finding it too heavy to cart away with the other box, left it in the street. Soon thereafter, Henry Berry Lowry disappeared. No bounty on him was ever collected, and there are competing stories in Lumbee oral tradition which state that he either fled the state or that he died in an accident. Rhoda Strong remained guarded about her husband's fate for the remainder of her life.

D. F. Lowry, a nephew of Henry Berry, maintained that Henry had befriended Adjutant-General Gorman over the course of their meetings, who agreed to help him escape the county. By this account, Gorman had Lowry disguised as a soldier and sent him on numerous searches with other troops for the gang, which were intentionally fruitless. Once it was decided that the troops would be withdrawn, Lowry's face was obscured with bandages and he traveled out of Robeson via train. D. F.'s son, Earl, maintained that Lowry faked his own death and disguised himself as a soldier, leaving with the other troops from a train station in Pates. He then served in the United States Army for four years before being discharged in Virginia. Another Lumbee tradition held that Lowry was smuggled out of the county in a specially-constructed coffin via train.

Orlin Hayes Lowry, son of Tom Lowry, recounted that he had witnessed Henry Berry's death. According to him, after the Lumberton robbery the gang went to Tom's home, where Tom's wife prepared them breakfast. All of the gang members went inside, except for Henry, who stood outside with his shotgun standing up between his feet. The gun then fired, and the shot went through Henry's head, killing him. Tom had his body wrapped in a sheet and instructed other gang members to give it a secret burial, so that no one could collect a bounty on it. Variations of this story are found in other accounts. Adjutant-General Gorman's memoirs stated that Henry had placed the gun against a corn crib at Tom's home and was sitting down when it slipped and fired into his head. A contemporaneous account from the New York Herald stated he shot himself while hiding in a blind shortly before the Lumberton raid. The strain of Lumbee oral tradition which contains Lowry's death agrees that his body was placed in a coffin built by Jesse Oxendine and taken by other gang members into Back Swamp. There they diverted a stream, buried the coffin in its bed, and then allowed the stream to flow again.

=== Demise of the Lowry Gang ===
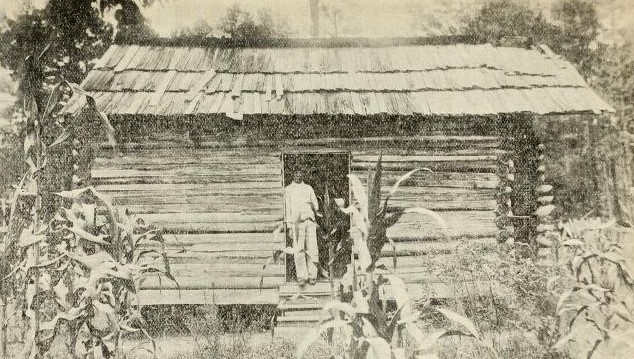
Andrew Strong's cabin, where Boss Strong was shot in March 1872

From Henry Berry's disappearance on, the Lowry War was characterized by bounty hunters tracking down straggler members of the gang. In early March 1872, bounty hunter James McQueen set about killing the Strong brothers. On March 7, he staked out Andrew Strong's cabin in Back Swamp. The two brothers arrived and ate dinner inside with their family. McQueen fired a shot through a hole in the door at Boss' head, causing him to collapse. He waited outside for Andrew to exit, but when this did not occur, he left for Shoe Heel. Wishart arrived with a posse the next day to recover the body, and found Flora and Rhoda Strong cleaning blood off of the floor. The women told the men that Andrew and Steve Lowry had taken Boss away. The lack of a body made the General Assembly reluctant to award McQueen the $6,000 bounty, though the legislature eventually gave him the money the following year. Boss Strong's body was never located.

By May, the only active Lowry Gang members were Andrew Strong and Tom and Steve Lowry, the rest having either died or disappeared. On May 2, Wishart agreed to meet Steve and Andrew in attempt to broker a compromise involving the outlaws' departure from the area. According to historians Adolph L. Dial and David K. Eliades, the meeting ended with both parties agreeing to meet again near Lebanon Presbyterian Church several days later, and Wishart was shot dead then. According to Evans, Wishart was killed at the meeting on May 2. Lumbee oral history maintains that Wishart was killed by Andrew after he attempted to shoot Steve, but the actual circumstances of his death remain unclear.

Wishart's death led to renewed efforts to suppress the outlaws. On May 13, Governor Caldwell requested another detachment of federal troops be sent to Robeson to combat the gang. Major Morgan belatedly responded on July 5 by sending a company of the 4th Regiment U.S. Artillery from Fort Johnston. During their stay the troops were not called upon by the local authorities to help them, and they withdrew at the end of the month. Morgan concluded that federal intervention was unhelpful and federal forces were never sent again to suppress the gang.

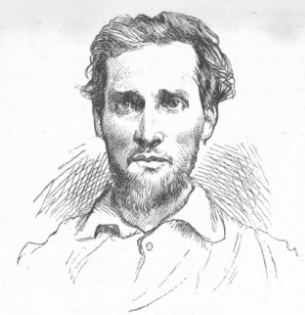
Tom Lowry (depicted) was shot by militiamen in July 1872.

Meanwhile, Aladon Strong Wishart and Robert Evander Wishart—the late colonel's respective younger brother and half-brother—reorganized the remnants of the county militia to launch a new search for the outlaws. After spying on the residents of Scuffletown, they learned Tom Lowry planned to attend a political meeting at Union Chapel on the morning of July 20. The militiamen erected a blind along the trail they expected Lowry to travel and lay in wait. Lowry came down the path as expected, accompanied by a friend. The militiamen opened fire, striking Lowry. He ran 100 yards away into a swamp before collapsing dead. The men took his body to Lumberton and collected a combined $6,200 in state and county bounties.

Steve Lowry and Andrew Strong no longer presented a great threat to county authorities, but continued to avoid capture. They still enjoyed the sympathies of the residents of Scuffletown and made public appearances in the community. In September they issued a "proclamation of outlawry" against several bounty hunters pursuing them, offering $200 reward for each. On December 25, they went to a store in Pates to confront a clerk, William Wilson, who had spoken ill of them. Strong threatened to kill Wilson if he did not leave the county the following day. The two outlaws left to partake in Christmas festivities, and Wilson loaded his shotgun in case they returned. Strong came back in the afternoon to make some purchases, and when he stepped out onto the porch Wilson shot him in the back of the neck, killing him instantly. Wilson took the body to Lumberton, collected the relevant bounties, and left the area.

Throughout 1873 bounty hunters continued to search for Lowry. He eluded them and avoided public gatherings, staying close to swamps. He grew unhealthy and began drinking heavily. That year the General Assembly passed the Amnesty Act, which pardoned persons found responsible for political violence in the preceding years. The Conservative-backed measure was designed to protect members of the Ku Klux Klan, and the last section of the law read, "the provisions of this act shall not be construed to extend amnesty to [...] Steve Lowry." Lowry was the only person mentioned by name in the statute. (Note: Dial and Eliades speculated that Henry Berry Lowry and Applewhite were not exempted in the law because they were believed to be dead.) Some of his friends petitioned the governor to pardon him, but their request was ignored.

In late February 1874, Lowry came out of hiding to join in a party at the John McNair planation. He laid down his rifle to play a banjo, but as he was about to start three bounty hunters who had been tracking him attacked; two shot him while the third struck him with an axe. The following day they took his body to Lumberton and collected the bounty, and the Lowry War ended.

== Contemporary media coverage ==
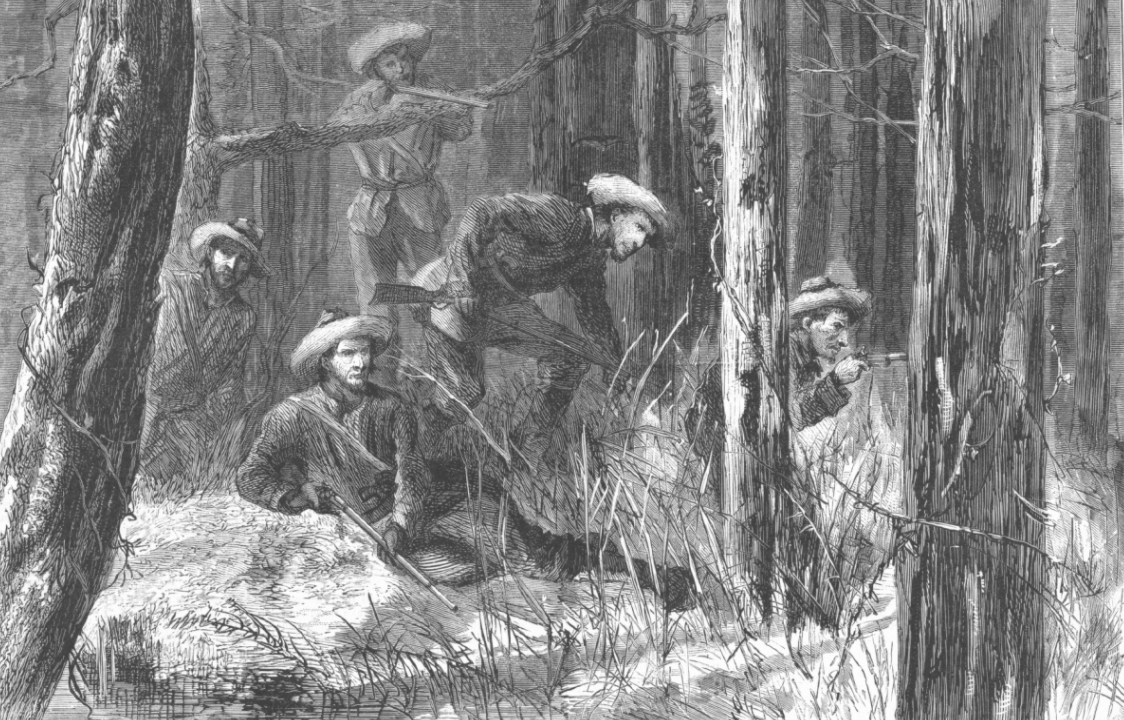
Artist's depiction of the Lowry Gang in a swamp from Harper's Weekly, 1872

The Lowry War was frequently reported on by The Robesonian, a Lumberton-based weekly newspaper founded in 1870, and the Wilmington Morning Star, North Carolina's largest paper. The Robesonian's reports were reprinted in other state newspapers before being covered in other publications across the country. The Lowry Gang reportedly paid close attention to how it was portrayed in the media, seeking out editions of papers and expressing knowledge of certain articles. The Robesonian's editor stated that he was once threatened by Lowry about his style of coverage and briefly fled the county. Most of the local coverage was simply listings of reported crimes and gang sightings, often repeating official statements of the authorities. Press coverage of the gang's racial makeup was often confused and contradictory, with papers describing Lowry and his followers variously as negro, mulatto, or "Indian-like". Southern Conservative and Democratic newspapers favored portraying them as dark-skinned as part of a wider effort to blame lawlessness in the South on black freedmen and Republicans. The Raleigh News criticized Harper's Weekly for publishing drawings of the gang that showed them as light-skinned.

North Carolina's Democratic and Conservative papers generally used their comment on the Lowry War to attack the state's Republican government for ineffectiveness, and especially in contrast to Republicans' aggressive suppression of the Klan. The Greensboro Patriot derisively suggested that Lowry should be "the next Radical candidate for Gov. of N.C." Republicans' comments in the press, though condemning the gang's activities, usually accused the Conservative papers of exaggerating the violence and significance of the conflict for political gain.

The Lowry War garnered national attention after The New York Times began reporting on it in October 1870. By the following year, the Associated Press wire was syndicating stories of the Lowry Gang around the country. The trial of Henderson Oxendine led the New York Herald to dispatch a reporter down to Robeson County to cover the proceedings, and two more were later sent to report on the Lowry Gang. In March 1872 Herald reporter A. Boyd Henderson arrived in Shoe Heel and established contact with some of the gang members. Hoping to portray themselves in a positive and sympathetic manner, they provided for his accommodation and he extensively interviewed them and their families. Henderson's stories were published by the Herald in a series, "The Swamp Angels". The Northern press coverage of the Lowry conflict, especially that of the New York Herald, generally fit into the local color genre, portraying Robeson County and the larger South as exotic and picturesque but also poor and backwards. One Herald reporter, George Alfred Townsend, compiled these reports into an 1872 dime novel, The Swamp Outlaws.

== Aftermath ==
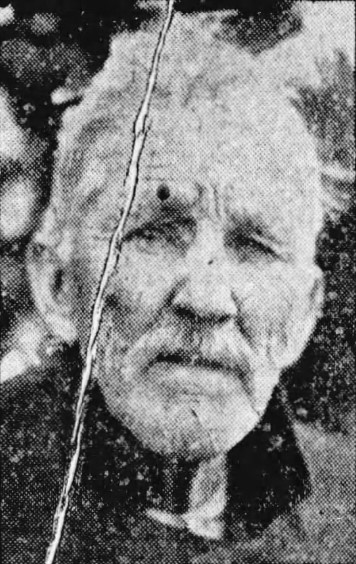
John Dial as an old man in 1926

Over the course of its activity, the Lowry Gang was implicated in the deaths of 22 people. As for the gang members, Henderson Oxendine had been executed; McLauchlin, Boss and Andrew Strong, and Steve and Tom Lowry had been killed; and Henry Berry Lowry went missing. John Dial was released from jail and lived quietly in Robeson County. George Applewhite was eventually captured by authorities in 1875. The following year the North Carolina Supreme Court ruled that he qualified for relief under the provisions of the Amnesty Act and he was released, returning to work as a bricklayer.

Following the end of the Lowry War and Reconstruction in North Carolina, the Lumbee Indians lacked state recognition as a unique group, and the Democrats now in control of the state created Jim Crow segregation laws. Republicans made up the majority of registered voters in Robeson County, but disagreements caused by the war prevented them from solidifying local control. The Lumbees resisted being treated the same as blacks under the new social order, and in 1885 the General Assembly voted to recognize them as Croatan Indians. The Lumbees refused to attend black schools and the General Assembly, partly hoping to avoid a reprisal of the Lowry War, created a state-supported normal school for them in 1887. The establishment of additional Lumbee institutions, such as churches and other schools led the state and local government to recognize a tripartite system of segregation in Robeson County.

== Legacy ==
=== Political significance ===
Evans wrote that the actions of the Lowry Gang "seemed aimed at the very foundations of the social order that the Conservatives were erecting to replace the Reconstruction experiment." He also asserted that despite being officially deemed "local bandits" by the government, the Lowry Gang was given "special treatment" by the authorities, namely in large bounties being placed on its members relative to other contemporary groups of outlaws in the United States.

Reflecting on the conflict, historian Malinda Maynor Lowery wrote, "For Robeson County Indians, the end of the Lowry War was their Wounded Knee massacre. Their nation didn't die, but it did become subject to state, local, and federal authority in many ways. The Lowry War left Robeson County Indians a separate social identity, but they spent the next seventy years, through the 1950s, gaining acknowledgement of their political autonomy." Evans concluded, "The Lowrys clearly made an impact [...] With the triumph of a frankly racist party during Reconstruction, it appeared that nothing could stop the winners from putting the Lumbee River Indians into the same half-free 'place' in which they generally succeeded in putting the blacks. But this effort failed. It appears to have failed, furthermore, to a great extent because of the bold deeds of the Lowrys, which filled the Lumber River Indians with a new pride of race, and a new confidence that despite generations of defeat, revitalized their will to survive as a people."

=== Commemoration and remembrance ===
The release of The Swamp Outlaws spurred numerous retrospective features on the Lowry War in books and newspapers throughout the late 1800s. Lowry is remembered by many Lumbee people as a folk hero and a Robin Hood-like figure, and his exploits have a prominent place in Lumbee folklore. As late as the 1930s, some Lumbees claimed he was living far away in Florida, Arizona, or Oklahoma but would occasionally visit Robeson County. Communications scholar Lorraine Ahearn wrote that the portrayal of the Lowry War in the confines of the "outlaw tropes" of the 1870s by the media helped establish its modern "mythic narrative" in the Lumbee community as a story of "Native American resistance to white supremacy". The Lumbee Tribe of North Carolina annually accords a person with the Henry Berry Lowry Award for distinguished community service.

The life of Henry Berry Lowry and the events of the war have been subject to fictional portrayal in several books and plays. In 1976 the Robeson County Historical Drama, Inc. produced a play dramatizing the life of Lowry, Strike At The Wind. Performances were conducted annually throughout the 1970s and 1980s in Pembroke as well as at the 1982 World's Fair in Knoxville, Tennessee. In the late 1990s and early 2000s shows became more sporadic due to financial costs. In 2007, North Carolina erected a highway historical marker in Pembroke to commemorate Lowry.

== See also ==
- List of wars involving the Confederate States of America

== Bibliography ==
- Ahearn, Lorraine (2016). Narrative paths of Native American resistance: Tracing agency and commemoration in journalism texts in eastern North Carolina, 1872–1988 (PhD thesis). University of North Carolina at Chapel Hill. OCLC 1105761379.
- Bradley, Mark L. (2009). Bluecoats and Tar Heels: Soldiers and Civilians in Reconstruction North Carolina. Lexington: The University of Kentucky Press. ISBN 978-0-8131-2507-7.
- Dial, Adolph L.; Eliades, David K. (1996). The Only Land I Know: A History of the Lumbee Indians (1st Syracuse University Press ed.). Syracuse: Syracuse University Press. ISBN 9780815603603.
- Evans, William McKee (2015). To Die Game: The Story of the Lowry Band, Indian Guerillas of Reconstruction (reprint ed.). Syracuse: Syracuse University Press. ISBN 9780815603061.
- Lowery, Malinda Maynor (2018). The Lumbee Indians: An American Struggle. Chapel Hill: UNC Press Books. ISBN 978-1-4696-4638-1.
- Lowery, Malinda Maynor (2010). Lumbee Indians in the Jim Crow South: Race, Identity, and the Making of a Nation. Chapel Hill: University of North Carolina Press. ISBN 978-0-8078-3368-1.
- Magdol, Edward (1973). "Against the Gentry: An Inquiry into a Southern Lower-Class Community and Culture, 1865-1870". Journal of Social History. 6 (3): 259–283. doi:10.1353/jsh/6.3.259. JSTOR 3786541.
- Massengill, Stephen E. (1985). "The Detectives of William W. Holden, 1869–1870". North Carolina Historical Review. 62 (4): 448–487. ISSN 0029-2494. JSTOR 23518497.
- Oakley, Christopher Arris (2006). "The Legend of Henry Berry Lowry: Strike at the Wind and the Lumbee Indians of North Carolina". The Mississippi Quarterly. 60 (1): 59–80. ISSN 0026-637X.
