= Red Banks =

Red Banks may refer to the following places in the United States:

- Red Banks, Kentucky, a former name of Henderson
- Red Banks, Mississippi, an unincorporated community
- Red Banks, North Carolina, an unincorporated community
- Red Banks, Brown County, Wisconsin, an unincorporated community
- Red Banks, Waupaca County, Wisconsin, an unincorporated community
- Red Banks Primitive Baptist Church, in North Carolina
- Red Banks, Virginia, a ghost town

== See also ==
- Red Bank (disambiguation)
- Redbank (disambiguation)
