= Scuffletown, North Carolina =

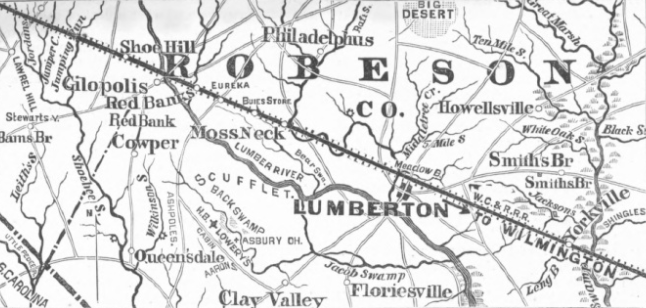
1872 map of central Robeson County from Harper's Weekly, showing Scuffletown

Scuffletown was a community in Robeson County, North Carolina, United States in the 1700s and 1800s dominated by Lumbee Native Americans. The exact location of the community, the date of its creation, and the origin of its name are unclear. The community, which had no formal government, encompassed swampy territory dotted with small farms and simple cabins. Most Scuffletonians were poor and made livings by growing crops, hunting and fishing, picking berries, or performing labor for neighboring farmers.

== Background ==
The Lumbee people in southeastern North Carolina originated from various Native American/Indian groups which were greatly impacted by conflicts and infectious diseases dating back to the period of European colonization. Those who survived these disruptions grouped together as homogenous communities. In 1830, the United States government began a policy of Indian removal, forcibly relocating Native American populations in the American South further west. Native Americans in Robeson County, North Carolina, were not subject to removal. Culturally, this group was not particularly distinct from proximate European Americans; they were mostly agrarian, and shared similar styles of dress, homes, and music. They also spoke English and were mostly Protestants. Their identity was rooted in kinship and shared location. Through intermarriage, they acquired some white and black ancestry. Not viewed as Native Americans by the state of North Carolina until the 1880s, these people were generally dubbed "mulattos" by locals and in federal documents throughout the mid-1800s to distinguish them from blacks. They were recognized under the name "Lumbee" in the 1950s.

== Origins and name ==
The date of Scuffletown's formation is unknown. According to Mary Norment, a white Robesonian and the widow of a man killed in the Lowry War, and North Carolina Adjutant General John C. Gorman, Scuffletown was created after Tuscarora farmers were forced off their land in the 1700s and retreated into sandy, swampy lands in the vicinity of the Lumber River, where they were joined by runaway enslaved Africans. Conversely, one white Robesonian reported to a newspaper in the 1870s that most Scuffletonians were of a mix of white and indigenous descent, very rarely intermingling with blacks. According to historian Malinda Maynor Lowery, in the early 1800s intermarriage and social interaction among blacks, whites, and Native Americans was common in the community, though this faded over subsequent decades.

"Scuffletown" was a pejorative name applied to the community by white Robesonians. Its own residents called it "the Settlement". The origins of the name are not certain. Norment suggested that one possible origin of the name was "It was generally a scuffle with the mulattos to live to live—to keep body and soul together, owing to their improvident habits." Another explanation she offered was that mulattos were known to gather at a tavern at Harper's Ferry in the area owned by James Lowry (an ancestor of Lumbee outlaw Henry Berry Lowry) in the 1700s and, after becoming drunk, would do a "broad shuffle". One tradition suggests that Continental Army General Burwell Vick was staying at the tavern in the 1700s after the American Revolution and named the surrounding area in homage to drunken scuffles that took place at the tavern, as a way of suggesting the lawlessness of the community. Other historians have suggested that the name was a corruption of "Scovilletown", a possible allusion to the Scoville family. Local residents were known as "Scuffletonians".

== Description ==
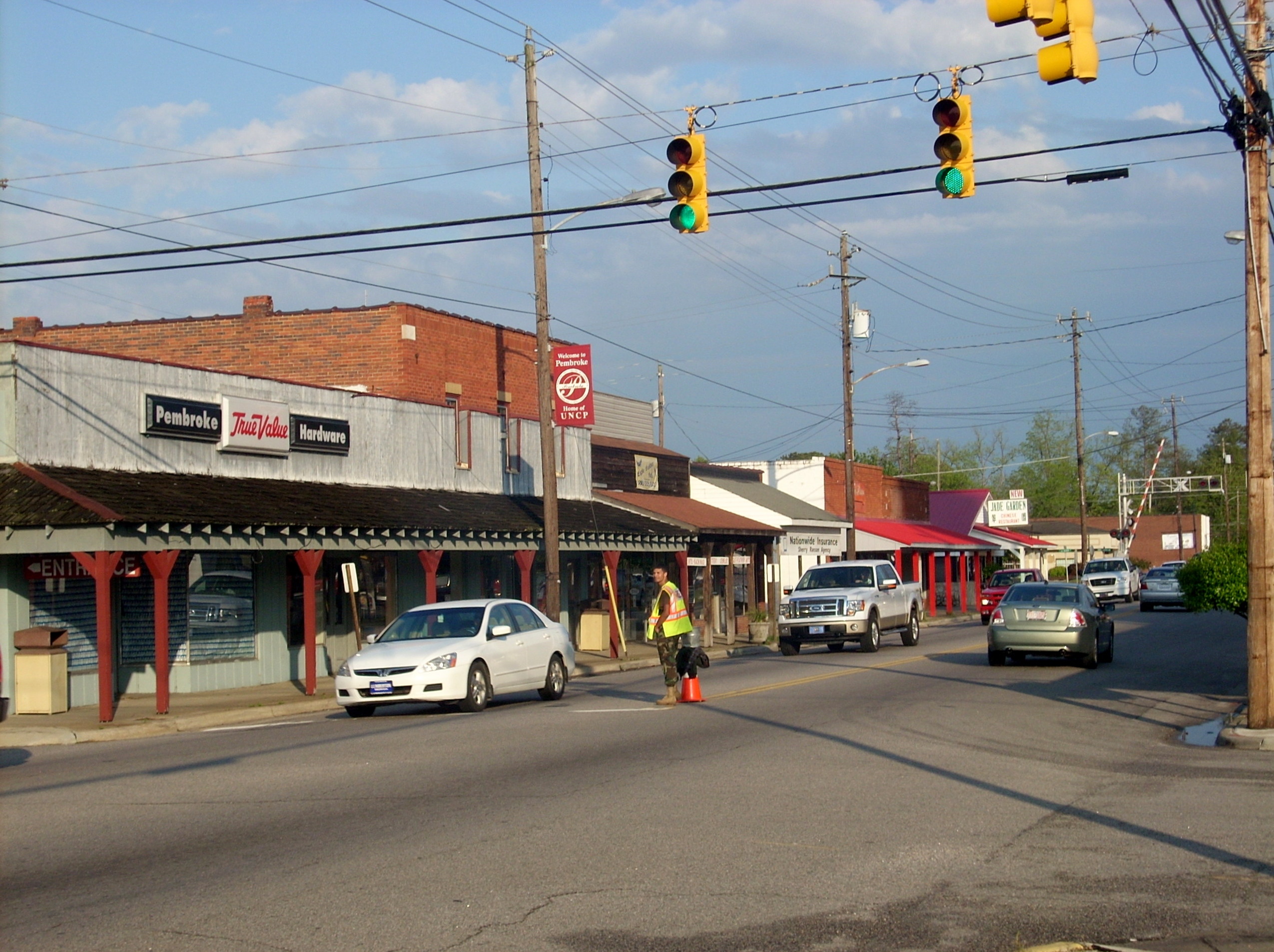
Some scholars believe that Scuffletown was located in the vicinity of the modern town of Pembroke (pictured).

The actual location of Scuffletown is disputed. Some scholars believe it was in the vicinity of the later town of Pembroke while others place it at Moss Neck. Historians Adolph L. Dial and David K. Eliades believed that it was a mobile community. Others still believe the name applied broadly to any concentration of Native Americans in Robeson County. According to the historian Lowery, Scuffeltown encompassed many smaller locations including Prospect, Hopewell, New Hope, Union Chapel, Saddletree, Harper's Ferry, Saint Annah, Fair Grove, and Moss Neck. Journalist Connee Brayboy included Moss Neck, Pates, Red Banks, Evans Crossing, and Brooks' Settlement within the area of Scuffletown. She wrote "the boundaries of 'Scuffletown' cannot be defined because it was not the custom of native people to define geographic boundaries...[the Scuffletown] designation is more an identification of families and clans, while the incorporated limits of Pembroke are recognized as the geographic, economic, and educational center of Native American country."

Scuffletown had no public streets or buildings and no local government. Contemporary accounts by Norment and journalists describe it as a swampy area marked by occasional hills and log cabins of rudimentary build. These one-room structures had minimal furnishings, and their occupants usually slept on dirt floors. Most had no windows, though some had peepholes near their doors. Most of these provided shelter to individual nuclear families. These homesteads were typically surrounded by three or four acres of fields, which were plowed and planted with corn, potatoes, and rice. The poor quality of the land generated minimal agricultural yields. Horses were rare, and oxen were used as draft animals. Dogs were kept for hunting. Water was sourced from hand-dug wells. Scuffletown residents, who were mostly poor, also provided for themselves by picking wild blackberries and whortleberries, hunting and fishing, or working as day laborers for neighboring farmers. The latter work included digging ditches, splitting shingles, harvesting sap for turpentine, and other various jobs. Norment reported the Lowry and Oxendine families to have better means than other Scuffletonians, with the former having better homes owing to many family members being carpenters by trade. (Note: According to historian Edward Magdol, the carpenter Lowrys did not actually live within the bounds of the Scuffletown community.)

According to Norment, the Scuffletonians were notorious for loose morals and committing petty crime, including theft of neighbors' livestock and engaging in drunken brawls. She also reported that despite being Protestant Christians, many were superstitious and believed in fairies, ghosts, and spirits. They attended their own churches and would sometimes listen to preaching circuit ministers. H. W. Guion, a former director of the Wilmington, Charlotte and Rutherford Railroad, testified that they were peaceful but were stubborn and lazy workers. Many Scuffletonians suffered from prolonged periods of hunger, especially during the American Civil War, when Scuffletonians attempting to dodge labor conscription for Confederate fort construction hid in the swamps and did not tend to their crops. The tension raised by the labor conscription and the subsequent murder in early 1865 of James Brantley Harris, a white Confederate Home Guardsman who had lived in Scuffletown and enforced the conscription, helped spark the Lowry War, a conflict between a mostly-Lumbee group of outlaws and the local white authorities.

== Works cited ==
- Ahearn, Lorraine (2016). Narrative paths of Native American resistance: Tracing agency and commemoration in journalism texts in eastern North Carolina, 1872–1988 (PhD thesis). University of North Carolina at Chapel Hill. OCLC 1105761379.
- Brayboy, Connee (1999). Pembroke in the Twentieth Century. Arcadia Publishing. ISBN 9780738590370.
- Dial, Adolph L.; Eliades, David K. (1996). The Only Land I Know: A History of the Lumbee Indians (1st Syracuse University Press ed.). Syracuse: Syracuse University Press. ISBN 9780815603603.
- Evans, William McKee (2015). To Die Game: The Story of the Lowry Band, Indian Guerillas of Reconstruction (reprint ed.). Syracuse: Syracuse University Press. ISBN 9780815603061.
- Lowery, Malinda Maynor (2018). The Lumbee Indians: An American Struggle. Chapel Hill: UNC Press Books. ISBN 978-1-4696-4638-1.
- Lowery, Malinda Maynor (2010). Lumbee Indians in the Jim Crow South: Race, Identity, and the Making of a Nation. Chapel Hill: University of North Carolina Press. ISBN 978-0-8078-3368-1.
- Magdol, Edward (1973). "Against the Gentry: An Inquiry into a Southern Lower-Class Community and Culture, 1865-1870". Journal of Social History. 6 (3): 259–283. doi:10.1353/jsh/6.3.259. JSTOR 3786541.
