= Lowrie =

Lowrie is a surname. Notable people with the surname include:

- Allen Lowrie (1948–2021), West Australian botanist
- Charles N. Lowrie, American landscape architect
- Dick Lowrie (born 1943), Scottish footballer
- Donald Lowrie (died 1925), American newspaper writer
- George Lowrie (1919–1989), Welsh footballer
- Henry Berry Lowrie (c.1844–1847 – disappeared 1872), North Carolina outlaw
- Jason Lowrie, New Zealand rugby league player
- Jed Lowrie, infielder for the Oakland Athletics
- John Patrick Lowrie, American voice actor
- Matthew B. Lowrie (1773–1850), mayor of Pittsburgh, Pennsylvania
- Philip Lowrie (1936–2025), English actor
- Ronnie Lowrie (born 1955), Scottish footballer
- Todd Lowrie (born 1983), Australian rugby league player
- Walter Lowrie (politician) (1784–1868), US senator from Pennsylvania
- Walter H. Lowrie, chief justice of Pennsylvania's Supreme Court
- William Lowrie (1857–1933), Australian agricultural educationist

== See also ==
- Lowry (disambiguation)
