= Robert Lowry =

Robert Lowry may refer to:

- Robert Lowry (governor) (1829–1910), American politician, governor of Mississippi
- Robert Lowry (hymn writer) (1826–1899), American professor of literature, Baptist minister and composer of gospel hymns
- Robert Lowry (Indiana politician) (1824–1904), American politician, U.S. Representative from Indiana
- Robert Lowry (writer) (1919–1994), American novelist, short story writer and independent press publisher
- Robert Lowry, Baron Lowry (1919–1999), Lord Chief Justice of Northern Ireland and a Lord of Appeal in Ordinary
- Robert Lowry (Royal Navy officer) (1854–1920), British admiral
- Robert William Lowry (printer) (1912–1963), New Zealand printer, publisher, typographer and teacher
- Robert William Lowry (British Army officer) (1824–1905)
- Robert William Lowry (pastor), American pastor, speaker, and LGBTQIA+ activist
