= Westover Hills Presbyterian Church =

Church in Little Rock, Arkansas, US

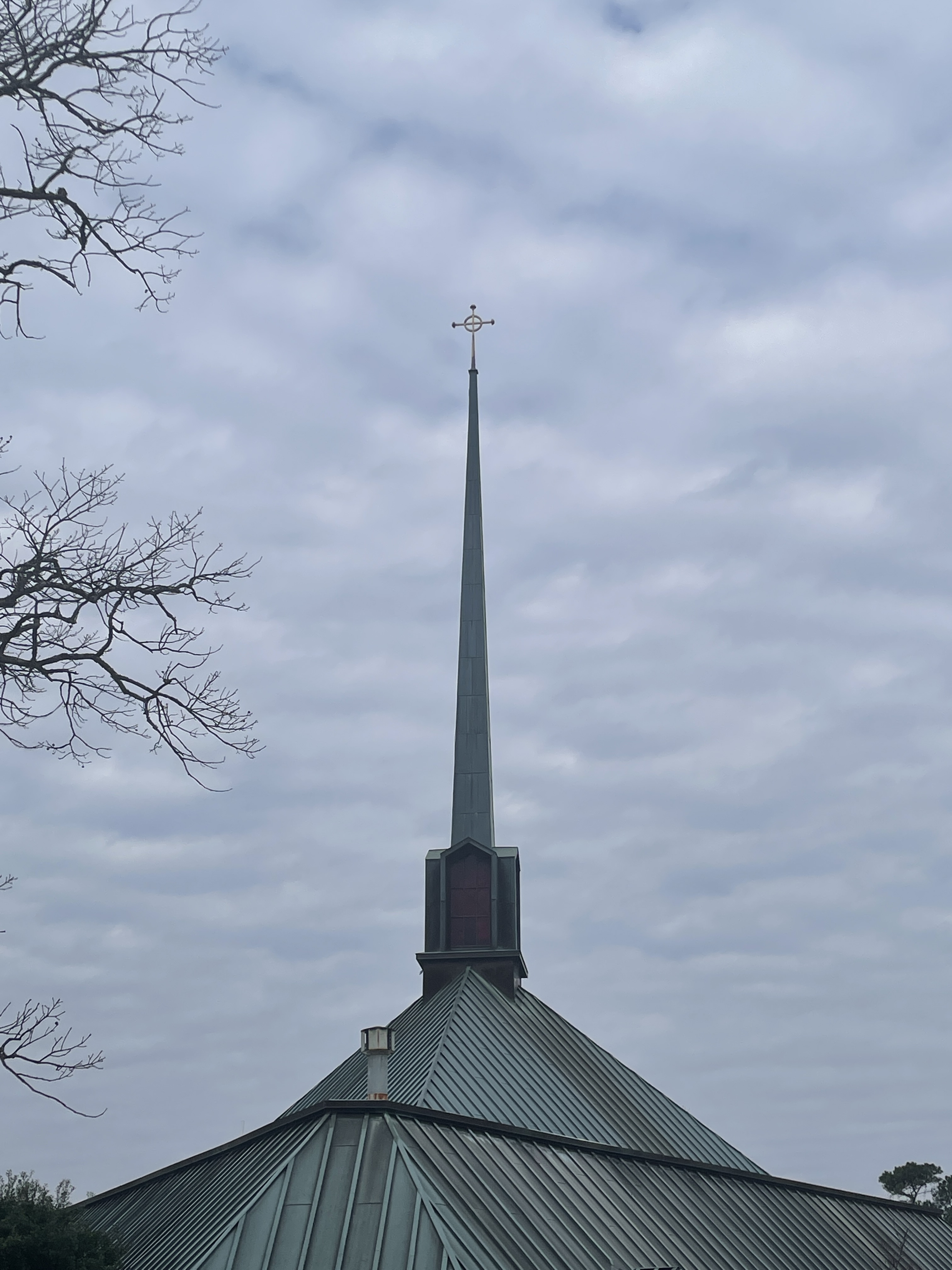
The steeple over Westover Hills Presbyterian can be seen from many vantages in the city.

Westover Hills Presbyterian Church is a congregation of the Presbyterian Church (USA) in Little Rock, Arkansas. Westover Hills is notable for its history in the Civil Rights struggle in Little Rock and the work of its then pastor Richard B. Hardie, Jr. in support of integration of the Little Rock Public Schools. The congregation takes public stances on issues including racial reconciliation, prisoners’ rights, and advocacy for LGBTQIA+ members of the community. The congregation is led by a board of 9 Ruling Elders and The Rev. Dr. Robert William Lowry.

== History ==
Westover Hills Presbyterian Church was founded in 1948, as part of a push to build churches in what was then western Little Rock. A group of 30 members of Second Presbyterian Church in downtown Little Rock began meeting as a “chapel” of Second Presbyterian. Second Presbyterian continued to provide financial assistance to Westover Hills until the new church became self-sustaining.

In the 1950s, as the church was continuing to grow toward self-sufficiency, the city and nation were roiled by the early Civil Rights Movement. Dr. Hardie, the church's pastor, was as a leader in the city to integrate the Little Rock Public Schools and to dismantle the structures of Jim Crow. Hardie supported these causes that he saw as matters of faith and fundamental justice. Hardie would later participate in the Selma to Montgomery marches, a decision that would cost him opportunities to serve many southern churches.

Following Hardie’s lead, the congregation of Westover Hills publicly declared their doors open to all races when most churches were still actively segregated and openly opposing the closure of the Little Rock Public Schools over the issue of integration. When the schools were closed by Governor Orval Faubus, Westover Hills along with Second Baptist and Trinity Episcopal churches opened its doors to students whose families created makeshift schools for the “lost year."

The work of the congregation continued under the leadership of Dr. David Dyer, Revs. Jim and Debbie Freeman, and Rev. Frank LeBlanc.

In the fall of 2021, the congregation called Dr. Robert W. Lowry to serve as the sixth pastor of Westover Hills. A native of Little Rock, Lowry came to Westover Hills from Fondren Presbyterian Church in Jackson, Mississippi. In addition to Fondren, Lowry has served churches in Texas, Louisiana, Michigan, Scotland, and Arkansas. Lowry, one of the first openly gay ministers in the Presbyterian Church (USA), works in advocacy for the LGBTQIA+ community with a particular focus on rights for transgender persons. In 2015 the Arkansas Times named Lowry as one of 25 Visionary Arkansans making an impact on the state. He was also featured in an episode of the PBS series Prideland.

== Cotham Memorial Lectures ==
The Cotham Memorial Lectures were created through an endowment gift in 1967. The purpose of the lectures is to bring scholars and theologians of the Judeo-Christian tradition to Little Rock. The lectures are generally held in the fall. Past lecturers include: Dr. Amy-Jill Levine, Rachel Held Evans, Rev John Pavlovitz, and Rev. Nadia Bolz-Weber.

== Partnerships ==
Westover Hills is one of four partner congregations that share hosting responsibilities for Little Rock's "Peace Across Faiths" dinner. The other partner congregations are the Medina Center, congregation B'Nai Israel (Reform), and the Arkansas Culture and Dialogue center. The 2026 dinner, held at Westover Hills on April 26, was the 10th anniversary of the event. Normally the event rotates among the four congregations' campuses. Due to the circumstances of world events and the ongoing wars in the Middle East, Westover Hills has played host since 2024.

In early 2025, Westover Hills Presbyterian Church and Pulaski Heights Presbyterian Church (2 miles to the east in the Hillcrest neighborhood) began conversations about sharing space on the Westover Hills campus. The congregation at Pulaski Heights decided that the best way forward for the church was merger. Over the next few months, Westover Hills and Pulaski Heights began the process of consolidating their ministries and selling the Pulaski Heights property. The merger is expected to become formal in the second quarter of 2026.

== Mission and ministries ==
Westover Hills' mission is to be "a congregation recognized as a safe place and a resource for action, acceptance, and joy". The congregation is active with numerous agencies and partners serving the unhoused, food insecure, children's welfare, and disaster relief. In 2025 the congregation sponsored a "summer of healthy living" to raise funds for fresh produce for Women and Children First, the Thrasher Boys and Girls Club in Little Rock, and the food ministry of El Zocalo Immigrant Services. In late 2022 when the city of Jackson, MS suffered catastrophic damage to the city water system, Westover Hills organized a collection of potable water in Little Rock which was delivered to partners in Jackson.

Westover Hills is the host and sponsoring congregation of the Central Arkansas Queer Collective an interfaith network of LGBTQIA+ people and allies. The QC is a recognized 1001 New Worshiping Community of the Presbyterian Church (USA).

A new multi-million-dollar facility for the preschool and congregational use was begun in 2005. The facility includes a regulation basketball court that doubles as the church Fellowship Hall, classrooms for the preschool and church activities, and a commercial kitchen. The original church building is used as office and meeting space. In 2011, the chapel was renamed “Hardie Chapel” in for Richard Hardie’s many years of service.

The church makes its facilities available to community groups including Barely Legal Young-people’s Group (a part of Alcoholics Anonymous), youth basketball teams, neighborhood associations, and other groups.

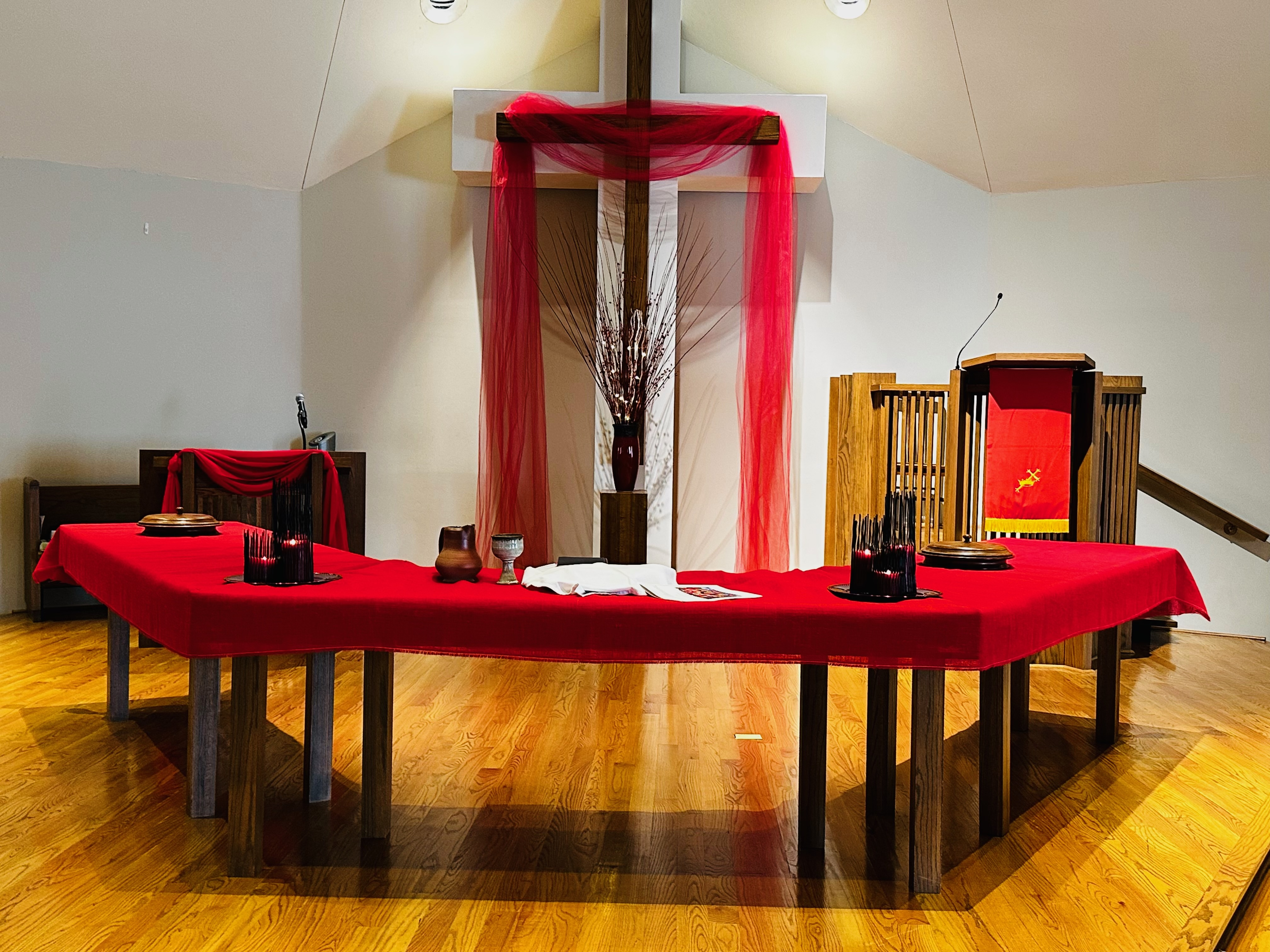
WHPC Chancel decorated for Pentecost

== Facilities ==
The church sits at the roundabout intersection of Kavanaugh Blvd., McKinley St., and Pine Valley Drive. When the church was founded, the intersection in front of the building (three blocks west of what was then N. Hays street) was the western terminus of the Pulaski Heights streetcar line on what was then the western edge of the city.

The original building was a small red-brick structure built in a traditional style with some neoclassical features. Since its founding, the church has hosted a pre-school for children up to age 5. The original structure served as the home of the church until a new facility was built on the property. The new church building, still in use as of 2022, is built in the modern style and features a nave designed in the round with a chancel platform extending into the center of the worship space. Unique to Presbyterian churches in Arkansas, the Westover Hills nave has kneelers in each pew. The sanctuary was designed by architects with the historic Cromwell firm in Little Rock. Firm founder Charles Thompson was noted for many 19th and early 20th century buildings across the state.

Below the sanctuary are classrooms, choir rehearsal space, and the “New Chapel.” Beginning in fall 2022, the New Chapel hosts Sister Thea Bowman of the Inclusive Catholic Church.

The copper clad roof with the Celtic cross topping the cupola is a landmark in the neighborhood that can be seen from many vantages in the northern part of Little Rock.

== Pastors ==
Westover Hills has been served by six installed pastors and numerous interim pastors since its founding. Common to all the pastors at Westover Hills is a commitment to progressive causes important to the church. The pastors of Westover Hills include:

- Dr. Richard B. Hardie Jr. (Founding Pastor) 1949–1985
- Dr. David Dyer 1988–1993
- Revs. Jim and Debbie Freeman 1995–2008 (Jim) and 2010 (Debbie)
- Rev. Frank LeBlanc 2013–2019
- Dr. Robert W. Lowry 2022–present
