= Redbank =

Redbank may refer to:

== Places ==
In Australia

- Redbank, Queensland, a suburb in Ipswich
- Redbank, Victoria
- Redbanks, South Australia

In the United States

- Redbank Township, Armstrong County, Pennsylvania
- Redbank Township, Clarion County, Pennsylvania
- Saluda, South Carolina, formerly known as Redbank

== Streams ==
In the United States

- Redbank Creek (Pennsylvania), a tributary of the Allegheny River

== See also ==
- Red Bank (disambiguation)
- Red Banks (disambiguation)
