= Red Bank =

Red Bank may refer to:

== Places ==
Belize

- Red Bank, Belize, a village in Stann Creek District, Belize

Canada

- Red Bank, New Brunswick, a rural community in Northumberland County

United States

- Red Bank, California
- Red Bank, Indiana
- Red Bank, Missouri
- Red Bank, New Jersey, in Monmouth County
- Red Bank, Gloucester County, New Jersey
  - Battle of Red Bank, in the above community
- Red Bank, South Carolina
- Red Bank, Tennessee

== See also ==
- Redbank (disambiguation)
- Red Banks (disambiguation)
