= Red Banks, Virginia =

- Unincorporated community
- Location within Virginia Location within the United States
- Coordinates: 38°47′55″N 78°35′45″W
- Country: United States
- State: Virginia
- County: Shenandoah
- Elevation: 965 ft (294 m)
- GNIS feature ID: 1502772

Red Banks is the former name of an unincorporated area in Shenandoah County, Virginia, United States. Red Banks was located on what is now U.S. Route 11, 2.2 miles (3.5 km) southwest of Edinburg.
