= James Lowery =

James Lowery may refer to:

- Jamie Lowery (born 1961), Canadian former soccer player
- Anybody Killa (born 1973), American rapper
- James R. Lowery (1884–1956), Canadian politician
