= Robert William Lowry (pastor) =

American pastor and activist

Robert William Lowry is an American pastor and LGBTQIA+ activist. He is ordained in the Presbyterian Church (USA). Lowry serves as senior pastor of Westover Hills Presbyterian Church in Little Rock, Arkansas.

== Early life and family ==
Lowry was born and raised in Little Rock, Arkansas, one of two children born to Catherine (née Ostner), a college professor, and Robert Cunningham Lowry, an attorney. Through his father, Lowry is descended from Matthew Cunningham, the first mayor of Little Rock, Arkansas. He was educated in the Little Rock Public schools and attended Little Rock Central High School. He holds a Bachelor of Arts from Millsaps College as well as the Master of Divinity from Austin Presbyterian Theological Seminary, the Master of Theological Studies from Garrett-Evangelical Theological Seminary, the Master of Arts in Political Theology from Union Presbyterian Seminary, and the Doctor of Ministry from Columbia Theological Seminary. Lowry is married to Brian Smith a corporate attorney.

== Activism ==
Lowry, who is openly gay, led a group of clergy in opposition to Arkansas HB 1228, a law that aimed to increase "judicial scrutiny" in cases involving religious beliefs and LGBT people as well as joining colleagues in opposing an earlier “bathroom bill” aimed at transgender persons. In 2015, in recognition of his work for LGBTQIA+ equality, the Arkansas Times named Lowry one of 25 Visionary Arkansans shaping the state.

Lowry's pastorate at an LGBTQ affirming congregation in Jackson, Mississippi led to a feature episode in the PBS docuseries Prideland. Despite threats to the network and Lowry personally, the series premiered as scheduled and became one of the most successful digital features on the network.

Lowry is an occasional contributor to both local and national media on topics including the role of religion in public life, LGBTQIA+ rights, politics, and gun violence prevention. He is also a critic of PC(USA) policy toward states like Texas and Florida which he says “ring hollow” in the face of humanitarian violations like those allegedly committed by these states.

Following the adoption of a resolution at the 225th General Assembly of the PC(USA) referring to Israel as "an apartheid state," Lowry took a public stand against the church's action. Congregation B’nai Israel, Reform Jewish congregation, invited Lowry to speak on the topic at a Friday evening Shabbat service.

In 2024, Lowry was named one of 26 inaugural "preaching fellows" of the Center for Faith and Justice.

== Pastorates ==
According to the directory of pastors of the PC(USA), he has served in a number of positions in the church as both an installed (permanent) and interim/transitional (temporary) pastor including:

- First Presbyterian Church Shreveport, LA Associate Pastor 2001-2002
- First Presbyterian Church Ann Arbor, MI Associate Pastor 2002-2005
- First Presbyterian Church Searcy, AR Transitional Pastor 2007-2010
- First Presbyterian Church Batesville, AR Transitional Pastor 2010-2011
- First Presbyterian Church Clarksville, AR Transitional Pastor 2011-2016
- Harmony Presbyterian Church Clarksville, AR Transitional Pastor 2011-2016
- Fondren Presbyterian Church Jackson, MS Senior Pastor 2017-2022
- Westover Hills Presbyterian Church Little Rock, AR Senior Pastor 2022–Present
