= Lowrey =

Lowrey may refer to:

== People ==
- Annie Lowrey (born 1984), American journalist
- Bill G. Lowrey (1862–1947), U.S. Representative from Mississippi
- Chris Lowrey (born 1986), New Zealand rugby union footballer
- Christopher Lowrey, American countertenor
- Eddie Lowrey (born 1891), Canadian professional ice hockey centre
- Elizabeth Lowrey, American interior architect
- Fred Lowrey (1902–1968), Canadian professional ice hockey defenceman
- Gerry Lowrey (1906–1979), Canadian professional ice hockey forward
- Grosvenor Lowrey (1831–1893), American lawyer
- James Lowrey (1802–1875), American lawyer and politician
- Janette Sebring Lowrey (1892–1986), American children's writer
- Joe Lowrey (1879–1948), Australian rules footballer
- Levi Lowrey, American singer-songwriter
- Lloyd W. Lowrey (1903–1992), American politician
- Mark Lowrey (cricketer) (born 1971), English cricketer
- Mark Perrin Lowrey (1828–1885), Southern Baptist preacher and Confederate General in the U.S. Civil War
- Pat Lowrey (born 1950), English footballer
- Peanuts Lowrey (1917–1986), outfielder in Major League Baseball

== Places ==
- Lowrey, California, a former town in the United States, named after George M. Lowrey
- Lowrey, Oklahoma, a community in the United States
- Lynn R. Lowrey Arboretum, arboretum located across the campus of Rice University in Houston, Texas

== Other uses ==
- Carr Lowrey Glass Company (1889–2003), manufacturer of glass bottles
- Lowrey organ, electronic organ named after Chicago industrialist Frederick Lowrey

== See also ==
- Lowry (disambiguation)
