= Rhoda Strong Lowry =

Lumbee Native American woman from North Carolina

- Born: 1849; Robeson County, North Carolina
- Died: October 18, 1909 (aged 59–60); Robeson County, North Carolina

Rhoda Strong Lowry (1849 – October 18, 1909), also known as the "Queen of Scuffletown", was a Lumbee woman from North Carolina. She allegedly helped her husband, Henry Berry Lowrie, flee after he and his gang killed many white people in attempt to avenge his father and brother's deaths.

== Early life ==
Rhoda Strong Lowry was born in Robeson County, North Carolina in 1849. Nicknamed "Queen of Scuffletown" due to her beauty, Rhoda was a legendary figure in Southern history for more than a century. Rhoda is thought to have grown up living in Robeson County with her father, who is believed to be a white man who changed his name from "Gorman" to "Strong" after fleeing murder charges in the state of Virginia. Rhoda's mother died when she was young, so Rhoda was often tasked with looking after her father. During this time the Lumbee Indians suffered from a state law that forbid them from voting or owning guns, making farming their only way of obtaining food.

== Marriage ==
Rhoda and her cousin Henry Berry Lowry started dating and not long after they made plans to wed. On December 7, 1865, the two were legally married in Robeson County, North Carolina. Rhoda was sixteen years old at the time, while Henry was 20.

When Henry escaped from jail, sources claim he not only wanted to return to Rhoda, but that she helped him escape. According to legend, Rhoda walked eighty miles from Scuffletown to Wilmington, North Carolina to set her husband free. Rhoda brought food to Henry's jail and seduced the jailer with her good looks. She refused the jailer's initial advances, but promised she would return. The next evening Rhoda repeated her visit and entered the jailer's apartment with him, where she pretended to accept his advances. The jailer removed his coat, gun belt, and key ring. When he bent down to remove his shoes, Rhoda pulled a heavy lead pipe from under her skirt and knocked the jailer unconscious. She then ran to the jail to free her husband with her newly stolen keys. Once Henry escaped, the pair paddled upstream in the Cape Fear River until they reached Scuffletown.

Later Henry was charged with killing a man and was imprisoned. He was moved to another prison due to feelings that his previous prison was not secure enough. He escaped the second prison and was placed on the most wanted list. Because the police could not find Henry, they changed strategies and started to arrest the wives of several band members and used them as bait. This ended up in a letter from Henry to the police saying that if they did not release their wives soon it would end up in a bloodbath.

Rhoda's husband disappeared in 1872, after only 6 years of marriage, leaving her behind with their three children. His disappearance was a mystery to which she gave no clues and he was never found. She has a reputation for protecting her husband which made her very popular within her community, especially since her husband was thought of as a hero. She is often seen as in modern times as a symbol of resistance to oppression because she withstood intimidation and refused to disclose the whereabouts of her husband. In 1897 Lowry was arrested for bootlegging and jailed for 60 days.

== Works cited ==
- Lowery, Malinda Maynor (2018). The Lumbee Indians: An American Struggle. Chapel Hill: UNC Press Books. ISBN 978-1-4696-4638-1.
