= Lowry Run =

Stream in Preble County, Ohio, U.S.

Lowry Run is a stream in Preble County, Ohio, in the United States.

The name Lowry Run commemorates a battle between Lieutenant Lowry and Little Turtle.

== Location ==
- Mouth: Confluence with Goose Creek, Preble County at 39°47′43″N 84°36′36″W
- Source: Preble County at 39°49′43″N 84°38′30″W

== See also ==
- List of rivers of Ohio
