= Lowry, Virginia =

Unincorporated community in Virginia, United States

- Unincorporated community
- Location within Virginia Location within the United States
- Coordinates: 37°21′03″N 79°25′51″W
- Country: United States
- State: Virginia
- County: Bedford
- Elevation: 807 ft (246 m)
- Time zone: UTC-5 (Eastern (EST))
  - Summer (DST): UTC-4 (EDT)
- ZIP Code: 24570
- Area codes: 540 and 826
- GNIS feature ID: 1495047

Lowry is an unincorporated community in eastern Bedford County, Virginia, United States. The community is located along State Route 715 and is 5.2 miles (8.4 km) east-northeast of Bedford. It is part of the Lynchburg Metropolitan Statistical Area.

== Demographics ==
As of the census of 2020, there were 41 people residing in the Lowry ZIP Code area.

== Education ==
The community is served by Bedford County Public Schools. Public school students residing in Lowry are zoned to attend Otter River Elementary School, Forest Middle School, and Jefferson Forest High School.

The closest higher education institutions to the community are located in Bedford and Lynchburg.

== Government ==
The United States Postal Service operates the Lowry Post Office within the community. The post office has the ZIP Code of 24570. The original post office opened on April 12, 1854.

== Infrastructure ==
=== Public safety ===
Law enforcement is provided by the Bedford County Sheriff's Office. Fire protection is provided by the Bedford Fire Department. Emergency medical services are provided by the Bedford County Department of Fire and Rescue.

=== Transportation ===
==== Air ====
The New London Airport is the closest public-use airport to the community. The Lynchburg Regional Airport is the closest airport with commercial service to the community.

==== Road ====
- Virginia State Route 715 (Lowry Road)

==== Rail ====
The Norfolk Southern Blue Ridge District runs through the community. The closest passenger rail service is located in Lynchburg.
