= Moss Neck, North Carolina =

Community in Robeson County, North Carolina

Coordinates: 34°40′03″N 79°09′10″W

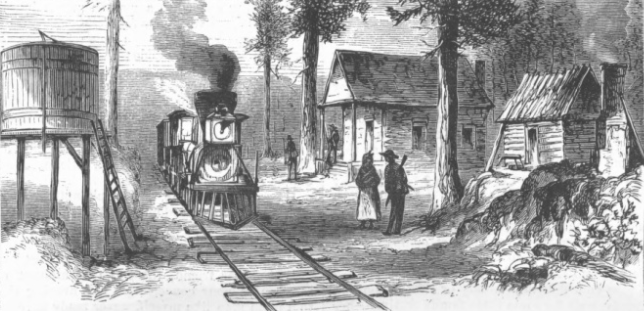
Moss Neck circa. 1872

Moss Neck is a community in Robeson County, North Carolina, United States.

== History ==
Moss Neck is located in west-central Robeson County. The name was coined by Native Americans to refer to a stream in the area, and it was later applied to the community after it was settled. It began as a center for turpentine distillation, though as local pine forests were depleted the industry moved south. The community remained due to the presence of a post office and a cooperage. In January 1861, the Wilmington, Charlotte and Rutherford Railroad built a line through the village. A railway station was established, leading to a revitalization of the local community, and it became a center of Lumbee activity. It was frequented by members of the Lowry Gang during the Lowry War. In 1892, the Wilmington and Weldon Railroad proposed building a north–south line through Moss Neck, but at the opposition of a prominent citizen the line was moved a few miles west to Campbell's Mill, which shortly thereafter became Pembroke. By 1909, in addition to the railway station, the community hosted several homes, two turpentine distilleries, a water mill, a sawmill, a hotel, a post office, a school, and a Methodist church. Over the following decades, the community declined as the turpentine industry moved southward and naval stores were supplanted by steel in shipbuilding. The station at Moss Neck was eventually closed, and other business migrated to Pembroke. In the 1920s the Methodist church was disassembled and rebuilt in Pembroke. By 1949, the town was largely deserted.

== Bibliography ==
- Blu, Karen I. (2001). The Lumbee Problem: The Making of an American Indian People (reprint ed.). Lincoln: University of Nebraska Press. ISBN 978-0-8032-6197-6.
- Dial, Adolph L.; Eliades, David K. (1996). The Only Land I Know: A History of the Lumbee Indians (1st Syracuse University Press ed.). Syracuse: Syracuse University Press. ISBN 978-0-8156-0360-3.
- Powell, William S. (1976). The North Carolina Gazetteer: A Dictionary of Tar Heel Places. Chapel Hill: The University of North Carolina Press. ISBN 9780807812471.
- Watson, Alan D. (2016). Wilmington, North Carolina, to 1861. McFarland. ISBN 9780786482146.
