= David Lowery =

David Lowery may refer to:

- David Lowery (director) (born 1980), American filmmaker
- David Lowery (footballer) (born 1984), English footballer
- David Lowery (musician) (born 1960), American musician

== See also ==
- David Lowry, British research consultant for nuclear and environment policy
