= Red Banks, North Carolina =

- Unincorporated community
- Location within North Carolina Location within the United States
- Coordinates: 34°42′11″N 79°15′03″W
- Country: United States
- State: North Carolina
- County: Robeson
- Elevation: 177 ft (54 m)
- Time zone: UTC-5 (Eastern (EST))
  - Summer (DST): UTC-4 (EDT)
- Area codes: 910, 472
- GNIS feature ID: 1022186

Red Banks is an unincorporated community located in Robeson County, North Carolina, United States.

The community played a major role in North Carolina during the rehabilitation period after the Great Depression, with the establishment of the Red Banks Mutual Association in the early 1930's.

Today, the community is home to mainly Native American families.
