= Henry Berry Lowry =

Leader of Civil War and post-Civil War insurgent gang in North Carolina

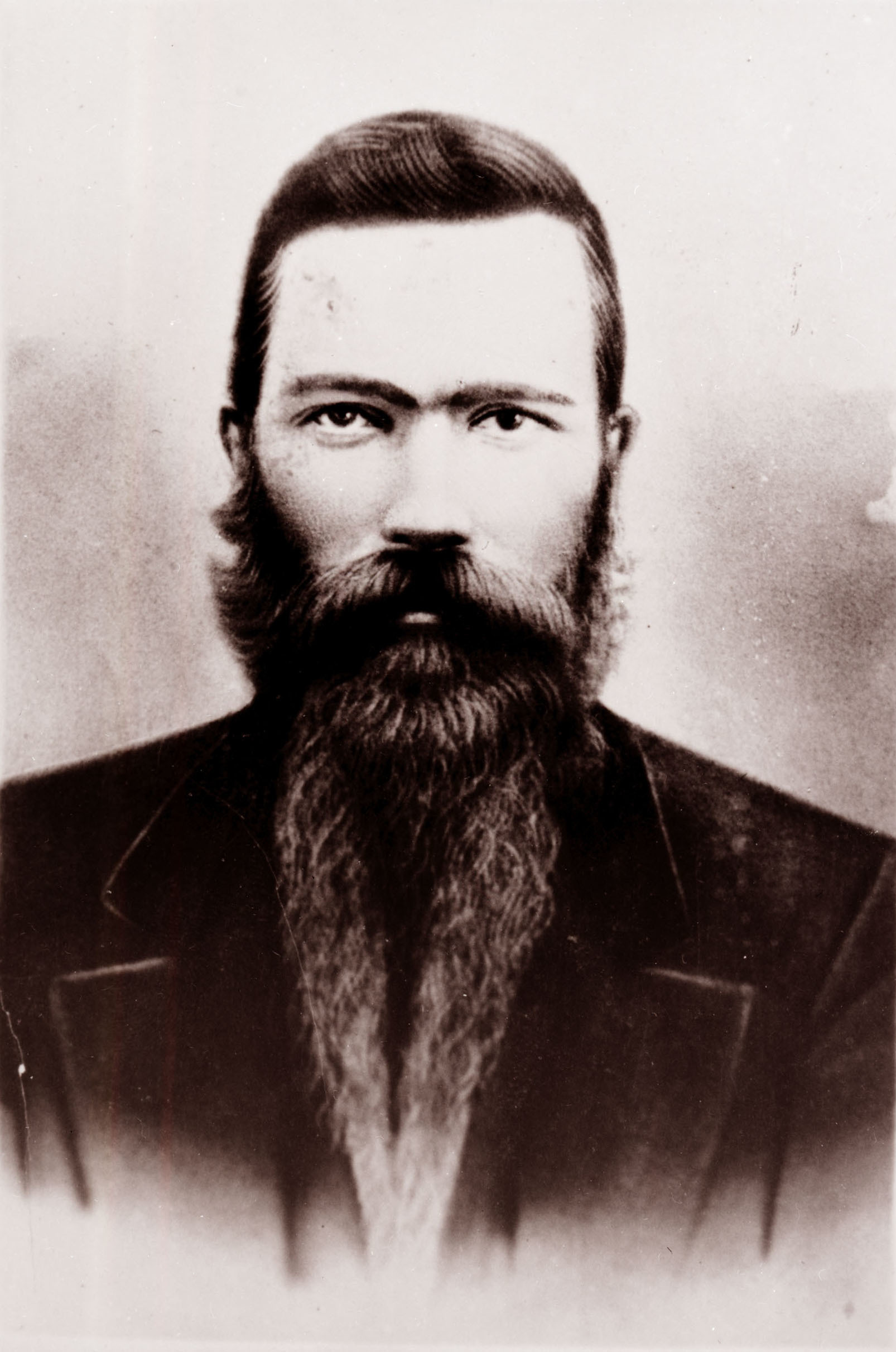
- This portrait is widely identified as one of Lowry, though some persons—including some descendants of his—believe it portrays a different person.
- Born: c. 1845; Robeson County, North Carolina, US
- Disappeared: 1872 (age 26–27); Robeson County, North Carolina
- Spouse: Rhoda Strong Lowry
- Parents: Allen Lowry (father); Mary Cumbo (mother)

Henry Berry Lowry (c. 1845 – unknown after 1872) was an American outlaw of Tuscarora, Lumbee, and Scottish descent. He led the Lowry Gang in North Carolina during and after the American Civil War. Many local North Carolinians remember him as a Robin Hood figure. Lowry was described by George Alfred Townsend, a correspondent for the New York Herald in the late 19th century, as "[o]ne of those remarkable executive spirits that arises now and then in a raw community without advantages other than those given by nature."

== Early life ==
Lowry was born c. 1845 to Allen and Mary (Cumbo) Lowry in the Hopewell Community, in Robeson County, North Carolina. Henry was a direct descendant of Chief Samuel Smith, signer of the 1803 Indianwoods Treaty. His father owned a successful 350-acre (1.4 km^{2}) mixed-use farm in the county. Henry Lowry was one of 12 children, described as multi-racial or free people of color.

== Lowry Gang ==
The Confederate government used conscription to force many locals to work on the construction of various forts around the Cape Fear River area for very little pay. Several Lowry cousins, excluded from military service because they were free men of color, had been conscripted to help build Fort Fisher. The Lowry Gang was originally started to aid those hiding from conscription. Other residents resorted to "lying out" (hiding in the region's swamps) to avoid being rounded up by the Confederate Home Guard and forced to work for low wages. As the Civil War approached its end, the Lowry Gang aligned themselves with various Union soldiers that had escaped from Confederate prison camps and conducted guerrilla warfare against the Confederacy.

On December 21, 1864, James P. Barnes, a neighbor of Allen Lowry, accused him of stealing hogs. Lowry's son Henry killed Barnes. In January 1865, Henry Lowry also killed James Brantley Harris, a conscription officer, for allegedly mistreating the women of the Lowry family. In March 1865, the Home Guard searched his father Allen Lowry's home and found firearms, which free people of color had been forbidden to own since after 1831 and Nat Turner's rebellion. The Home Guard convened a kangaroo court, convicted Allen Lowry and his son William, and executed them in March 1865. Henry reportedly watched from the bushes. Thereafter, young Henry came to be regarded as the new leader of the Lowry band. Although Lowry's band was composed mostly of Native Americans, among his chief lieutenants were the black man George Applewhite and the white youth Zachariah McLaughlin. The Lowry gang committed many robberies with atypical conditions. Victims of the thefts were treated respectfully, considering the circumstances, and the victims could potentially avoid being robbed if they could show that they could not afford it. The Lowry gang often returned certain stolen items such as horses and wagons when they no longer needed them. The gang at times was known for sharing their profits with the poor, such as distributing corn to the hungry.

== Lowry War ==
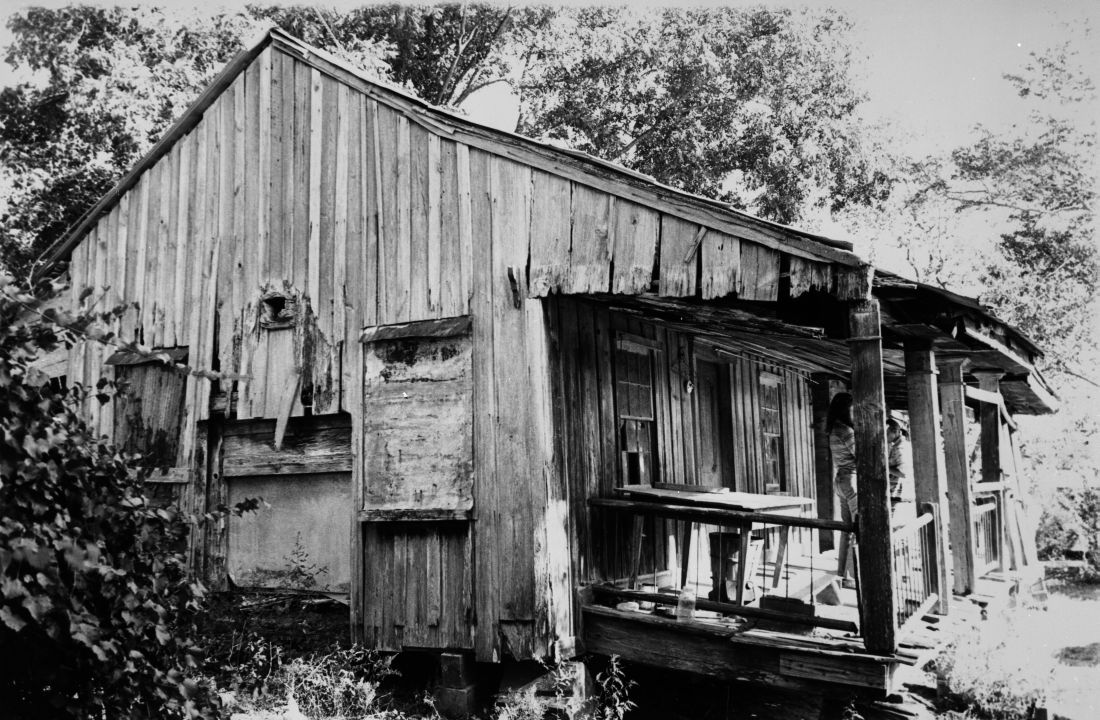
Lowry's cabin in 1986, before restoration

Henry Lowry led a gang in committing a series of robberies and murders against the upper class, continuing until 1872. The attempts to capture the gang members became known as the Lowry War. The Lowry gang consisted of Henry Lowry, his brothers Stephen and Thomas, two cousins (Calvin and Henderson Oxendine), two of his brothers-in-law, two escaped slaves, a white man, and two other men of unknown relation.

Lowry's gang continued its actions into Reconstruction. Republican governor William Woods Holden outlawed Lowry and his men in 1869, and offered a $12,000 reward for their capture: dead or alive. Lowry responded with more revenge killings.

On December 7, 1865, he married Rhoda Strong. Immediately after the wedding, and in the presence of several hundred wedding guests, Lowry was arrested by former members of the Confederate Home Guard turned county militia and under the charge of murdering James Barnes. He was able to escape by filing through the bars with a file that was smuggled to him by members of his gang. The governor at the time, Jonathon Worth, placed a $300 dead or alive bounty on his head, but the gang would go on to evade captivity for another 3 years despite many efforts made by the militia to apprehend him. A few notable events include fending off a search posse while using a boat for cover and eluding troops from United States military that were sent down to North Carolina specifically to capture him. In 1871 Francis Marion Wishart became colonel of the Police Guard manhunt and had the wives of the Lowry band held hostage in prison. Henry Berry Lowry and other band members sent the colonel a letter with an ultimatum, either the release of their wives of the Lowry Gang, or "the bloodiest times will be here than ever was before—the life of every man will be in jeopardy." Their wives were abruptly released.

Lowry's band opposed the postwar conservative Democratic power structure, which worked to reassert its political dominance and white supremacy. The Lowry gang robbed and killed numerous people of the establishment. Because of this, they gained the sympathy of the non-white population of Robeson County. The authorities were unable to stop the Lowry gang, largely because of this support. The conservative Democratic party was replaced by a more moderate Republican party with ideological similarities to many Lowry supporters.

In February 1872, shortly after a raid in which he robbed the local sheriff's safe of more than $28,000, Henry Berry Lowry disappeared. Colonel Wishart called the reports of his death "ALL A HOAX." The $12,000 reward for his life was never collected. It is claimed he accidentally shot himself while cleaning his double-barrel shotgun. As with many folk heroes, the death of Lowry was disputed. He was reportedly seen at a funeral several years later. Without his leadership, every member of the gang except two were subsequently captured or killed. Reverend Patrick Lowry, as a delegate to the Republican state convention in 1872, announced that his brother (Henry Berry) was in fact dead. However, Henry Berry's wife, Rhoda, insisted until her death in 1909 that he had escaped, even though she remarried a few years after his disappearance. Henry Berry Lowry had three children: Sally Ann (b. 1867), Henry Delany (b. 1869), and Nealy-ann (b. 1870).

== Depictions ==
- Starting in 1976, Lowry's legend has been presented each summer in an outdoor drama called Strike at the Wind! in Pembroke, North Carolina. Set during the Civil War and Reconstruction years, the play portrays Lowry as a Native American culture hero who flouts the white power structure by fighting for his people and defending the county's downtrodden citizens.
- Aftershock: Beyond the Civil War DVD (91 min.) A History Channel production. Dir. David W. Padrusch. Prod. Matt Koed. New York : A&E Home Video; dist. by New Video, 2007.
- Indian warriors: the untold story of the Civil War. DVD (50 min.). Dir. Geoffrey Madeja. Prod. Bernard Dudek. The History Channel, 2006.
- Through Native Eyes: The Henry Berry Lowrey Story (1999) is a documentary by North Carolina director Van Coleman.

== Commemoration ==
The Lowry family home was moved to the grounds of the North Carolina Indian Cultural Center in Pembroke. In 2007, North Carolina erected a highway historical marker along Lowry Street in Pembroke to commemorate Lowry.

== Books ==
- Evans, W. McKee. TO DIE GAME: the story of the Lowrie Band, Indian guerillas of Reconstruction. Baton Rouge: Louisiana State UP, 1971.
- Humphreys, Josephine, NOWHERE ELSE ON EARTH, Penguin Books, copyright 2000
- Norment, Mary C. "THE LOWRIE HISTORY, As Acted in Part by Henry Berry Lowrie, the Great North Carolina Bandit. With Biographical Sketches of His Associates. Being a Complete History of the Modern Robber Band in the County of Robeson and State of North Carolina." Wilmington: Daily Journal Printer, 1875.
- Thompson, Kaden Ryan. HENRY. Kaden Ryan Books, 2020, 2024.
