= Lumbee =

Mixed-race ethnic group in North Carolina

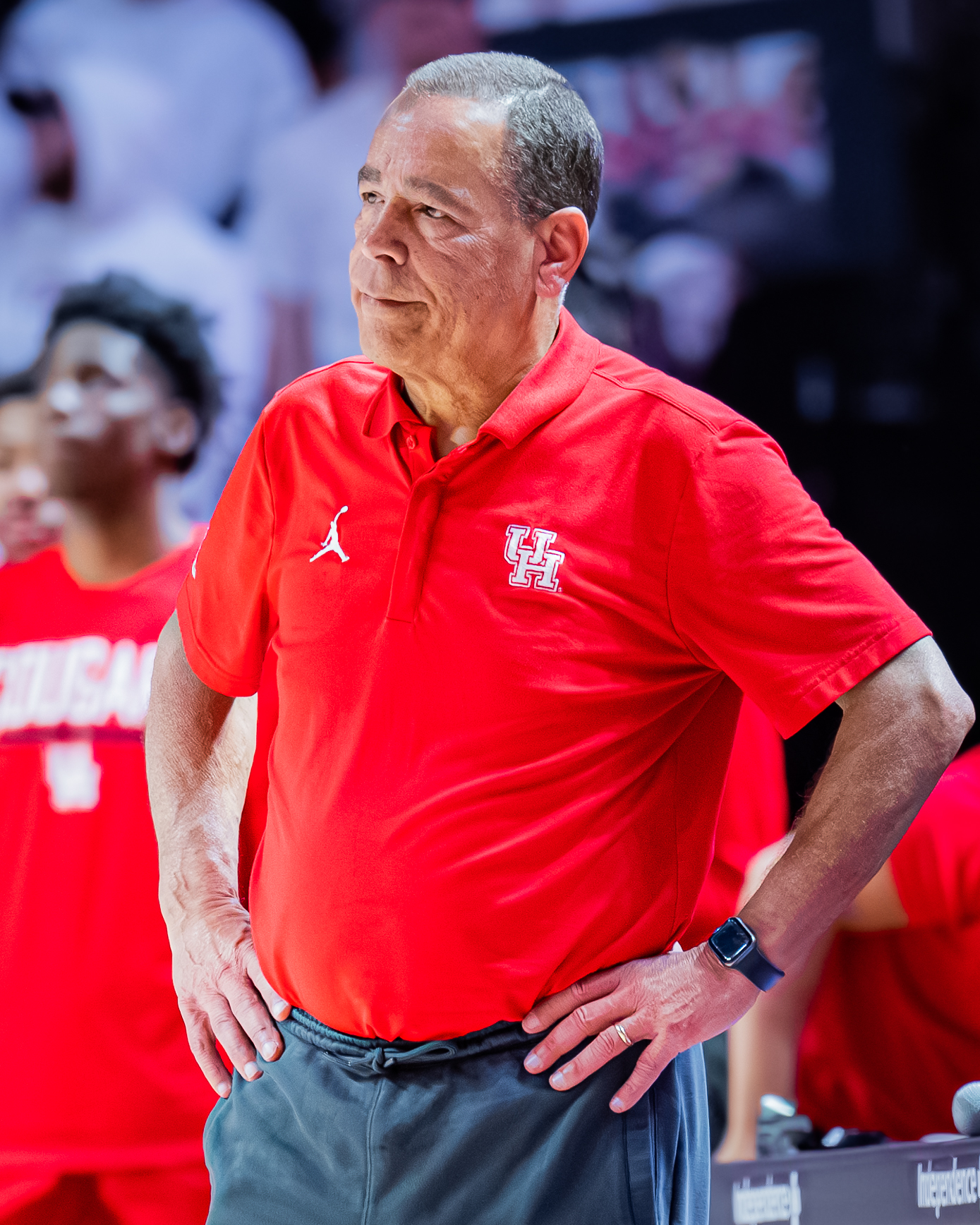
- Kelvin Sampson, a member of the Lumbee Tribe of North Carolina

Total population
- More than 60,000 (2025)

Regions with significant populations
- Eastern United States (North Carolina, South Carolina, Virginia, Maryland, Michigan, Tennessee)

Languages
- Main: English, American Indian English

Religion
- Christianity

Related ethnic groups
- Pee Dee Lumbee, Melungeons, Louisiana Redbones, Dominickers, Carmelites, Chestnut Ridge people, Free Black people, Atlantic Creoles, Free people of color, Cheraw, African Americans, English Americans, Scottish Americans, Scotch-Irish Americans

The Lumbee, also known as People of the Dark Water, are a mixed-race people group of the Americas, some of whom comprise the federally recognized Lumbee Tribe of North Carolina. Primarily located in Robeson County, North Carolina, the Lumbee claim to be descended from numerous Indigenous peoples of the Southeastern Woodlands who once inhabited the region and have been shown to have connections with other racial isolate groups, such as the Melungeons and Louisiana Redbones.

The Lumbee take their name from the Lumber River, which winds through Robeson County. Pembroke, North Carolina, in Robeson County, is their economic, cultural, and political center. According to the 2000 United States census report, 89% of the population of the town of Pembroke identified as Lumbee; 40% of Robeson County's population identified as Lumbee. The Lumbee Tribe was recognized by North Carolina in 1885. In 1956, the U.S. Congress passed the Lumbee Act, which recognized the Lumbees as being American Indians but denied them the benefits of a federally recognized tribe.

In 2025, President Donald Trump signed an executive order to advance the tribe's recognition. On December 18, 2025, he signed the Lumbee Fairness Act into law, making them a federally recognized tribe.

== History ==
Archaeological evidence shows that Robeson County has been continuously occupied by Native people for at least 14,000 years, as recent as the Late Woodland period (mid-1700s). Every named era found elsewhere in pre-European-contact North Carolina is also present in the archaeological record of Robeson County.

=== 17th century ===
Historian Virginia DeMarce states the earliest documented Lumbee families are of Tidewater origin. Documentation demonstrates the families descend from free African-American families in Virginia. The Cumbo family of the Lumbee directly descends from Emanuel Cumbo (b. 1644) of James City County, the son of two Africans from the Kingdom of Ndongo. The Dial family of the Lumbee originates from Benjamin Doll, an African landowner in 17th century Jamestown. Analysis by Estes, Goins, Ferguson et al. shows the Goins family of the Lumbee originating from a paternal African lineage, suggested to be from 1600s Hanover County.

Author Tim Hashaw claims Melungeons, the Louisiana Redbones, and the Lumbee all share the same free Black ancestors from historic Tidewater, noting that many surnames associated with them initially appeared in the records of Virginia from the 1630s-1690s, such as Oxendine, Gibson, Goins, Harris, Brooks, Johnson, and Driggers. Some originators of these names were Anthony Johnson, Emmanuel Driggers, and John Gowen. He states these progenitors often intermarried and adopted each other's children, and later migrated south into North Carolina to both avoid the rising prejudice in Virginia and seek the cheaper land on the frontier.

=== 18th century ===
Oral traditions about the history of some Lumbee families extend back to the mid-1700s. The earliest European map referring to Native American communities in the area of the Lumber River was prepared in 1725 by John Herbert, the English commissioner of Indian trade for the Wineau Factory on the Black River. Herbert identified some nearby communities as the Saraw, Pee Dee, "Scavano", and Wacoma. Many in these communities assimilated into the Catawba, but modern-day Lumbees claim connection to them, even though none of their tribes are located within the boundaries of present-day Robeson County.

==== Settlement in historic Bladen County ====
A 1773 petition by Archibald Mckissack listed the names of inhabitants who took part in a "Mob Raitously Assembled together," composed of "free Negors and Mullatus" apparently defying the efforts of colonial officials to collect taxes. The proclamation declared the "Above list of Rogus [sic] is all living upon the Kings Land without title." The Chavis, Grooms, Ivey, Kersey, Locklear, and Sweat families were all included on this list. A later colonial military survey described "50 families a mixt crew, a lawless People possess the Lands without Patent or paying quit Rents." Genealogist Paul Heinegg claims this proclamation is referring to the first free Black people in what was then Bladen County.

Hamilton McMillan wrote that Lumbee ancestor James Lowrie had received sizable land grants early in the century, and, by 1738, possessed combined estates of more than 2,000 acres (810 ha). Adolph Dial and David Eliades claimed that another Lumbee ancestor, John Brooks, held the title to over 1,000 acres (400 ha) in 1735 and that Robert Lowrie gained possession of almost 700 acres (280 ha).

==== Settlement in Drowning Creek ====
A state archivist noted in the late 20th century that no land grants were issued during these years in North Carolina. The first documented land grants made to individuals claimed to be Lumbee ancestors did not take place until the 1750s, more than a decade later. None of the various petitions for federal recognition by the Lumbee people relied on the McMillan, Dial, or Eliades claims.

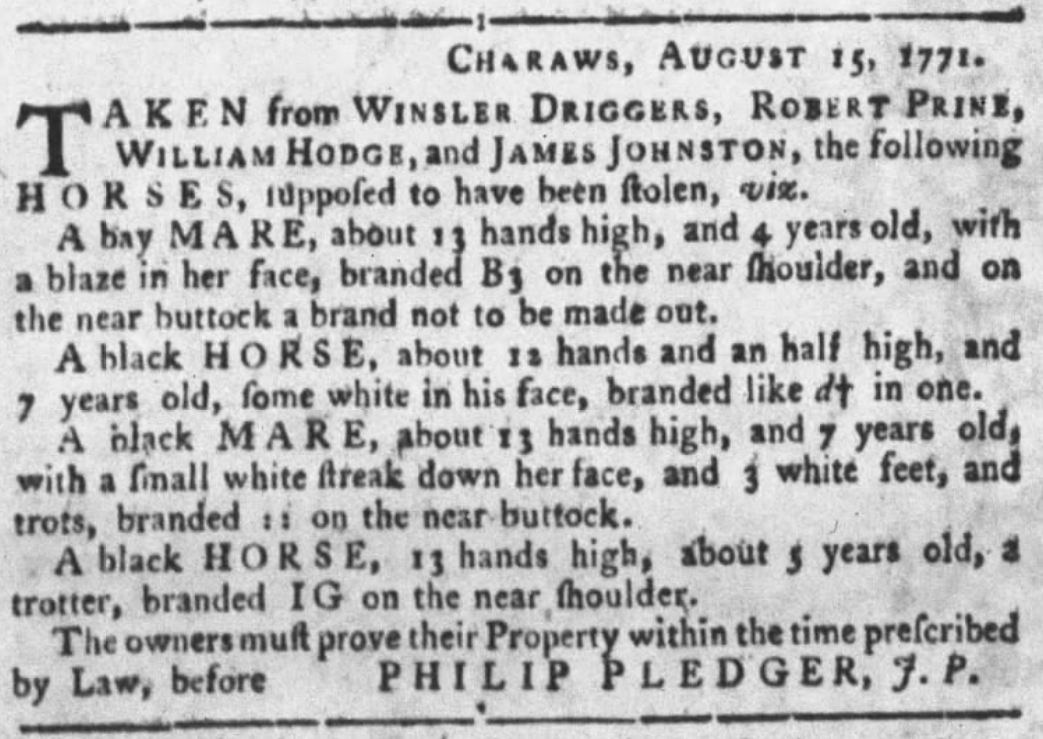
Notice in the South Carolina Gazette about horses stolen by Winslow Driggers available for return in Charaws, SC

Land records show that in the second half of the 18th century, persons since identified as ancestral Lumbees began to take titles to land near Drowning Creek (Lumber River) and prominent swamps such as Ashpole, Long, and Back. One example is William Driggers, who improved land on a swamp east of Drowning Creek. He was of the Driggers family, stated by Lumbee historians to be one of the founding Lumbee families in Drowning Creek. According to James Campisi, an anthropologist retained by the Lumbee tribe to aid their petition for federal recognition, the area "is located in the heart of the so-called old field of the Cheraw documented in land records between 1737 and 1739." In 1771 William's brother, a Black outlaw by the name of Winslow Driggers, was reported in the South Carolina Gazette as captured by "Settlers near the Cheraws" and hanged under the Negro Act for cow theft, after his gang had "committed all Manner of Depredations upon the industrious settled Inhabitants". On the same page, the horses he stole were shown to be available to their previous owners in Charaws, South Carolina, where a heavy Regulator presence existed. This could possibly suggest the settlement of free Black people in the area descended from the former African slaves Emanuel and Frances Driggus, who were the great-grandparents of William and Winslow according to genealogical analysis.

==== Surnames and families ====
Pension records for veterans of the American Revolutionary War in Robeson County listed men with surnames later associated with Lumbee families, such as Samuel Bell, Jacob Locklear, John Brooks, Berry Hunt, Thomas Jacobs, Thomas Cummings, and Michael Revels. In 1790, other men with surnames since associated with Lumbee-identified descendants, such as Barnes, Braveboy (or Brayboy), Bullard, Chavers (Chavis), Cumbo, Hammonds, Lowrie (Lowry/Lowery), Oxendine, Strickland, and Wilkins, were listed as inhabitants of the Fayetteville District; they were all "Free Persons of Color" in the first federal census. Some of these surnames, such as Chavis and Cumbo, are known to be shared in common with Melungeons. Author Tim Hashaw notes that Cannon Cumbo, who is claimed as a core Lumbee progenitor, was directly descended from Manuel Cumbo/Cambow, an African free Black man from Virginia. He notes he was initially recognized as white in Bladen County, but as a free person of color in Robeson, and was sometimes regarded as Portuguese by his neighbors. He married Tabitha Newsom, who was related to one of the leaders of Nat Turner's Rebellion.

=== Antebellum (1815–1861) ===
Following Nat Turner's slave rebellion of 1831, the state legislature passed amendments to its original 1776 constitution, abolishing suffrage for free people of color. This was one of a series of laws passed by North Carolina whites from 1826 to the 1850s which the historian John Hope Franklin characterized as the "Free Negro Code", creating restrictions on that class. Free people of color were stripped of various civil and political rights which they had enjoyed for almost two generations. They could no longer vote or serve on juries, bear arms without a license from the state, or serve in the state militia. As these were obligations traditionally associated with citizenship, they were made second-class citizens.

==== Legal cases ====
In 1853, the North Carolina Supreme Court upheld the constitutionality of the state's restrictions to prevent free people of color from bearing arms without a license. Noel Locklear, identified as a free man of color in State v. Locklear, was convicted of being in illegal possession of firearms. In 1857, William Chavers from Robeson County was arrested and charged as a "free person of color" for carrying a shotgun without a license. His counsel argued that he was a white man due to being five generations removed from his black ancestor, but Chavers was ruled to be a "free Negro" and like Locklear, was convicted. Chavers promptly appealed, his lawyer arguing that there was no evidence Chavers was a "free Negro", and that the judge had misled the jury on what defines a "free Negro". The court noted the definition of "free person of color" was poorly defined and reversed the previous decision, finding that "The indictment then, in the present case, may embrace a person who is not a free Negro within the meaning of the act, and for that reason it cannot be sustained."

=== Civil War ===
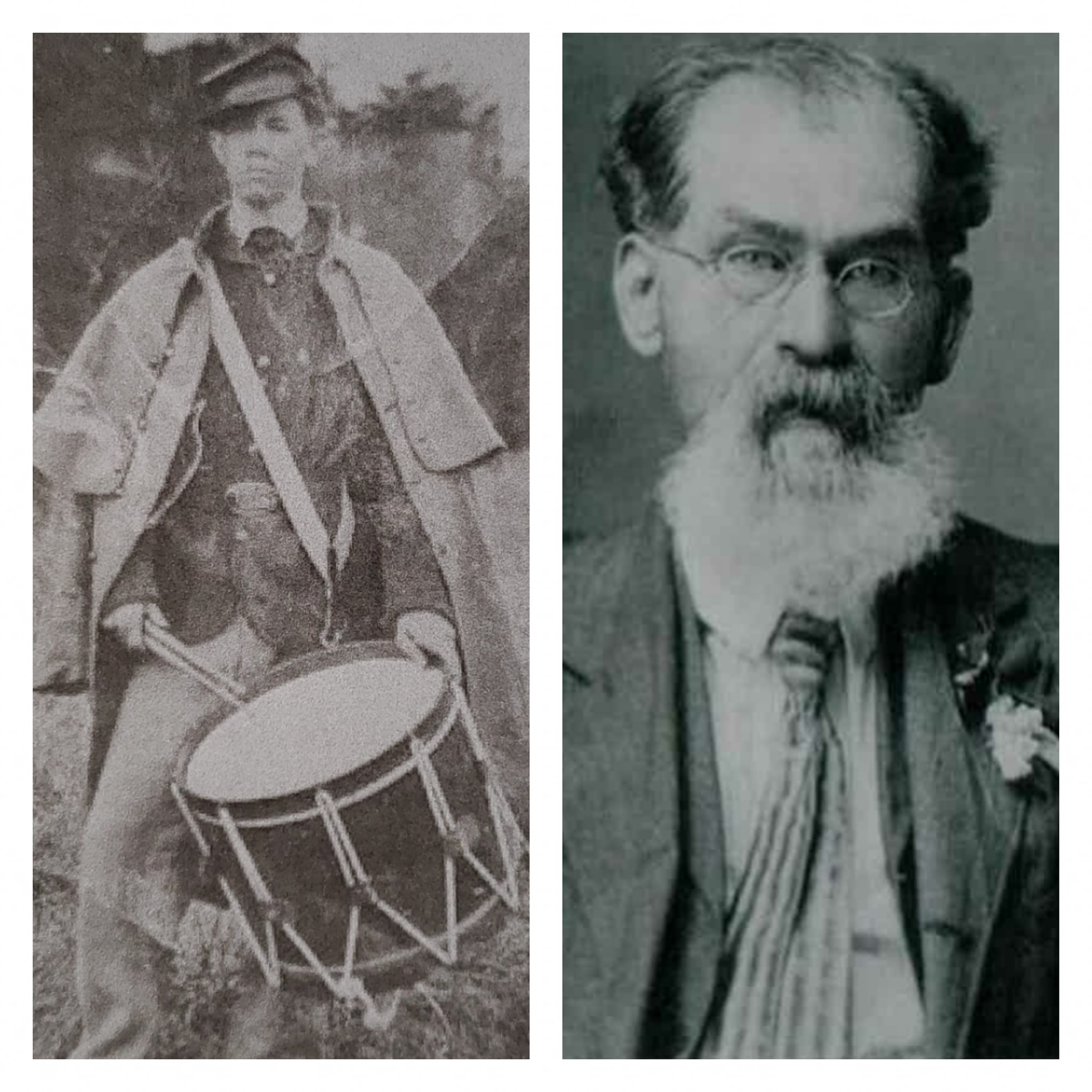
Angus Chavis, a Confederate volunteer in North Carolina at the age of 15

A yellow fever epidemic in 1862–1863 killed many slaves working on the construction of Fort Fisher near Wilmington, North Carolina, then considered to be the "Gibraltar of the South". As the state's slave owners resisted sending more slaves to Fort Fisher, the Confederate Home Guard intensified efforts to conscript able-bodied free persons of color as laborers.

Despite the widespread sympathies among the Indian community for the plight of the participants in this guerilla warfare, nearly 150 Lumbee ancestors voluntarily enlisted in the Confederate Infantry, including the nephew-in-law of Henry Berry Lowry described below.

==== Lowry War ====
Early in the Civil War, North Carolina turned to forced labor to construct its defenses. Several people from the "free negro settlement" had been conscripted as laborers to help build Fort Fisher, near Wilmington. Henry Berry Lowrie escaped and several of his relatives joined him in the swamps where they resorted to "lying out" (that is, hiding out in remote areas), to avoid being rounded up by the Home Guard and forced to work as impressed laborers again, where they had complained of poor food and treatment.

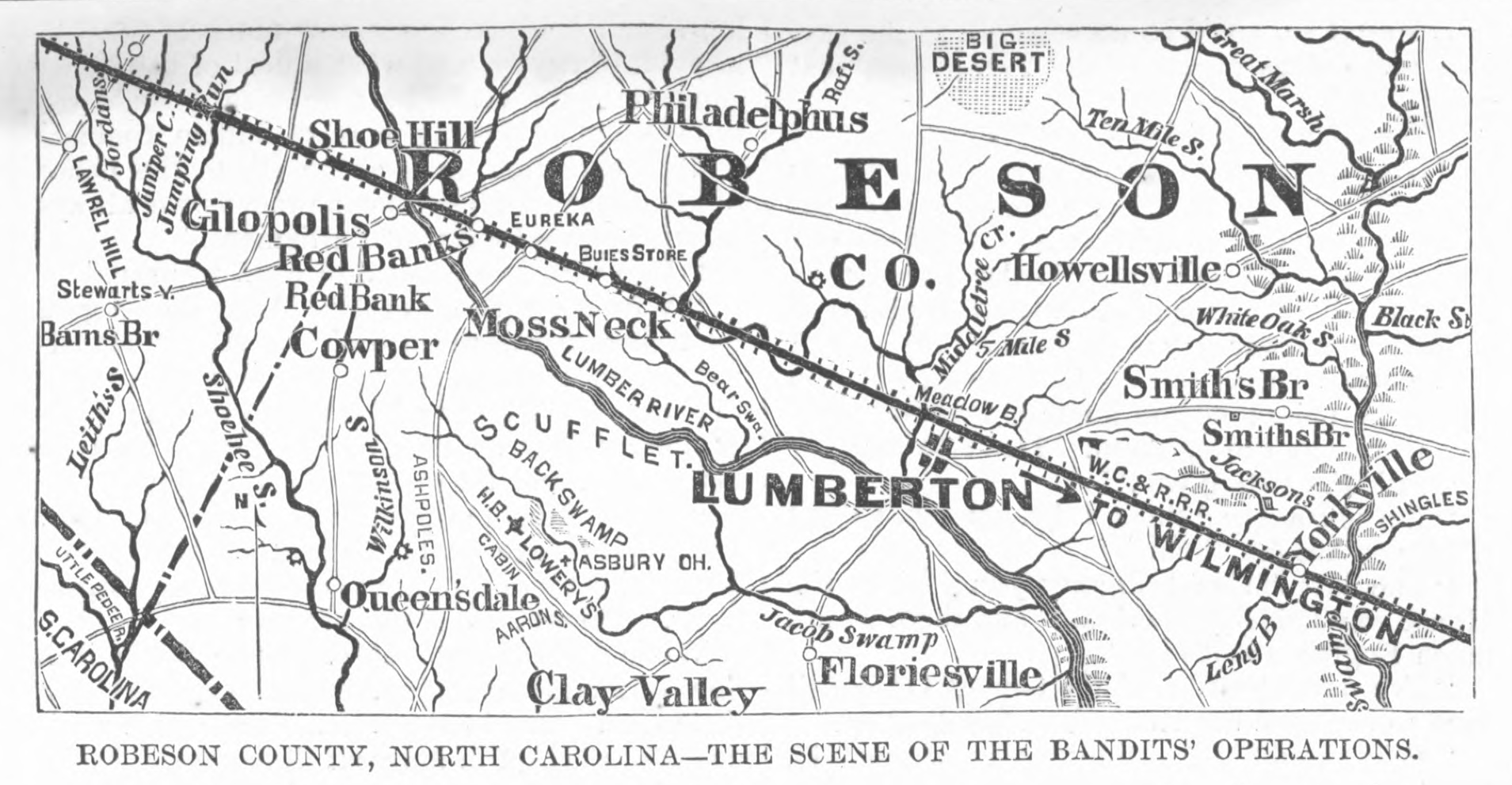
Map of Robeson County in 1872.

The Lowrie gang, as it became known, resorted to crime and conducting personal feuds, committing robberies and murders against white Robeson County residents and skirmishing with the Confederate Home Guard. They grew bolder as the war turned against the Confederacy. In December 1864, the Lowrie gang killed James P. Barnes after he had drafted workers, including the Lowries, for work on local defenses. Barnes had earlier accused Henry's father, Allen Lowrie, of stealing hogs. Next, the gang killed James Brantley Harris, a Confederate conscription officer who had killed a Lowrie relative.

After the Civil War, the Lowrie gang continued their insurgency, committing robberies and murders. The authorities' raids and attempts to capture gang members became known as the Lowry War. Lowrie's gang continued its activities into the Reconstruction Era. Republican governor William Woods Holden declared Lowrie and his men outlaws in 1869, and offered a $12,000 reward for their capture: dead or alive. Lowrie responded with more revenge killings. Eluding capture, the Lowrie gang persisted after Reconstruction ended and conservative white Democrats gained control of North Carolina government, imposing segregation and white supremacy.

In February 1872, shortly after a raid in which he robbed the local sheriff's safe of more than $28,000, Henry Berry Lowrie disappeared. It is claimed he accidentally shot himself while cleaning his double-barrel shotgun. As with many folk heroes, the death of Lowrie was disputed. He was reportedly seen at a funeral several years later.

=== State recognition as "Croatan Indians" ===
During the late 1800s, the ancestors of the Lumbee referred to themselves as Melungeons and "Portuguese". Their efforts to classify themselves as "Indian" began around the same time. Before public schooling in North Carolina, some light-skinned free people of color in Robeson County had been allowed to enter private schools for white people. Others went to mission schools, documented by a minister saying he had "preached to the poor mulattos of Robeson." In 1868, the legislature established public education for the first time, providing for white and black schools. The aforementioned "poor mulattos" were not allowed to attend white schools, and refused to send their children to school with the free Blacks. Paul Heinegg states African-Americans free since the colonial era disliked their loss of status after attending colored schools with freedmen. They thus demanded for separate "Indian" schools. Following the Reconstruction Era, white-dominated legislatures across the South imposed codified racial segregation into law, and referred to the "Indians" as “the mulattoes of Robeson County”.

==== Reclassification and establishment of schools ====
In the 1880s, the Democratic Party was struggling against the biracial Populist movement which combined the strength of poor whites (Populist and Democrats) and blacks (mostly Republicans). The Democrats wished to make North Carolina a Jim Crow state. Robeson County Democrat Hamilton McMillan proposed to have the state recognize the "mulatto" people of Robeson County as the "Croatan Indians" and to create a separate system of Croatan Indian schools. He won legislation, shifting their legal status away from "mulatto".

McMillan noted they had previously called themselves "Melungeans", and that some still did. By the end of the 19th century, the "Indians of Robeson County" (as they then identified) established schools in eleven of their principal settlements. They created a committee for each school to "verify that all pupils in these schools were Indians" to prevent "non-Indians" from attending them.

==== McMillan v. School Committee ====
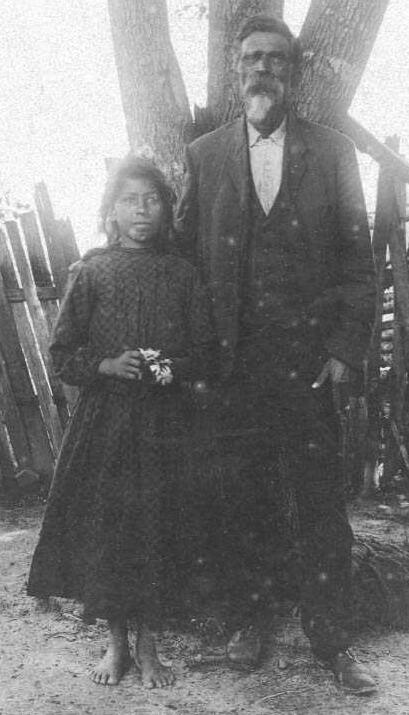
Preston Locklear with Rosetta Brooks, photographed in 1908.

In 1888, the children of a local Black man, Nathan McMillan, (Note: Nathan is not known to be related to Hamilton Mcmillan.) and his wife were not allowed to enroll their children in the Croatan schools. They were denied even though his wife was the sister of one of the committee members, Preston Locklear, who was himself a "Croatan Indian". McMillan sued, arguing in court that his wife was "Croatan", and thus so were his children. One member of the defence admitted the "Croatans" used to be referred to as "Mulattos", but the court declined from considering this testimony. The court ruled that his children were "Negros" and thus could not attend, regardless of their "Croatan" parentage, stating

"if, by tracing back four successive generations, through father or mother, we reach a negro ancestor of the plaintiff's children, they are excluded from the Croatan schools by the act establishing them."

Meaning that someone with any "Negro" ancestor "to the fourth generation" would necessarily not be Croatan. This judgement mirrored State v. Chavers, where a person could not have a "Negro" ancestor within four generations to be classed as a Free person of color.

==== Separate Indian school system ====
In 1887, the Indians of Robeson County petitioned the state legislature to establish a normal school to train Indian teachers for the county's Indian schools. With state permission, they raised the requisite funds, along with some state assistance, which proved inadequate. Several tribal leaders donated money and privately held land for schools. Robeson County's Indian Normal School eventually developed as Pembroke State University and subsequently as the University of North Carolina at Pembroke.

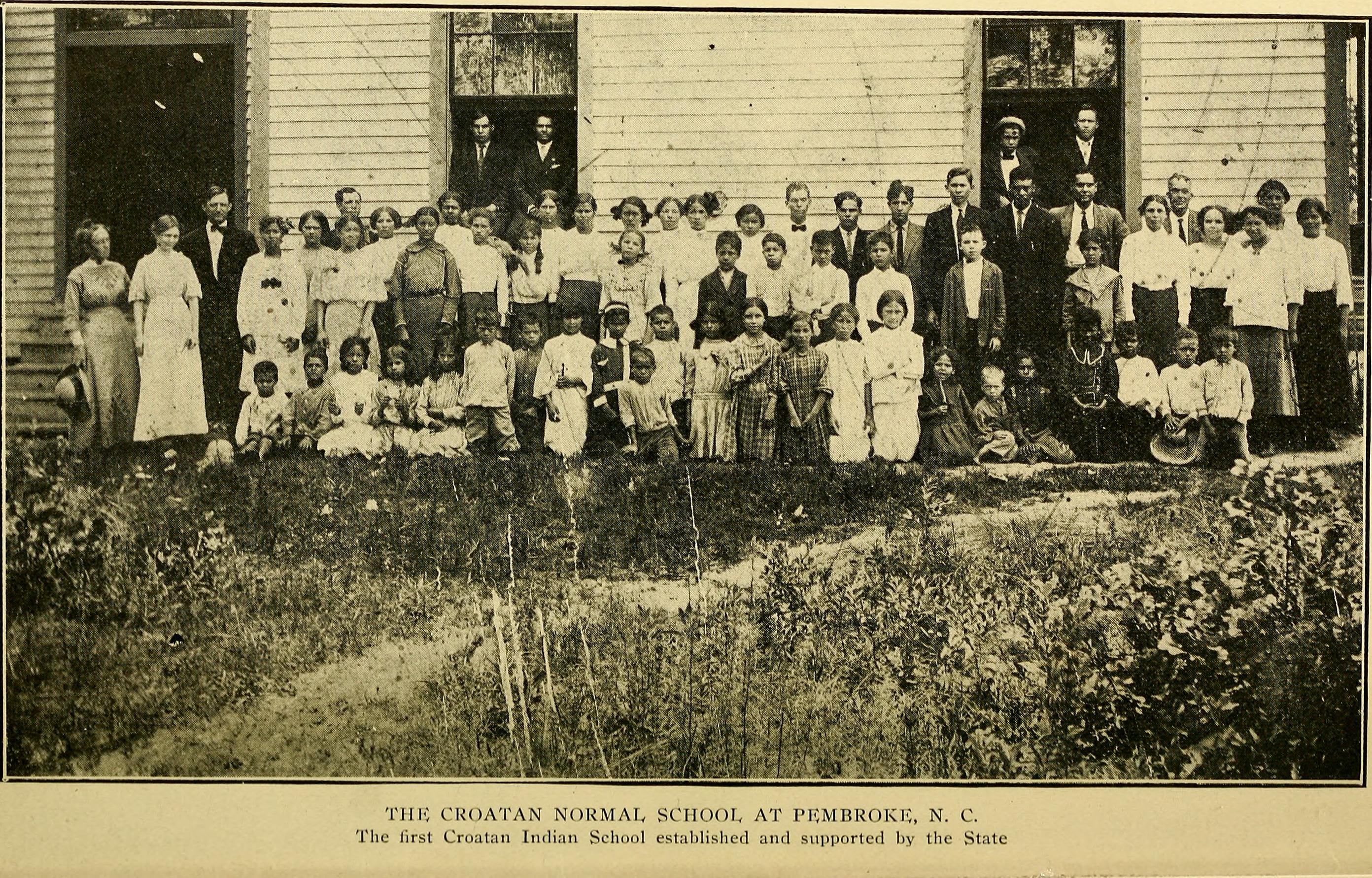
The Croatan Normal School in Pembroke, N.C.

In 1899, North Carolina Congressman John D. Bellamy introduced the first bill in Congress to appropriate federal funds to educate the Indian children of Robeson County. They introduced another bill a decade later, and yet another in 1911. The Commissioner of Indian Affairs, T. J. Morgan, responded to Congress and the Croatan Indians, writing that, "so long as the immediate wards of the Government [Indians on reservations] are so insufficiently provided for, I do not see how I can consistently render any assistance to the Croatans or any other civilized tribes." [sic, civilized tribes were defined in contrast to Indians on reservations, who were wards of the government.]

By the first decade of the 20th century, a North Carolina Representative introduced a federal bill to establish "a normal school for the Indians of Robeson County, North Carolina," to be paid for by the federal government. Charles F. Pierce, U.S. Supervisor of Indian Schools in the Bureau of Indian Affairs, opposed the legislation since, "[a]t the present time it is the avowed policy of the government to require states having an Indian population to assume the burden and responsibility for their education, so far as is possible."

=== Early efforts to gain federal recognition ===
The people achieved state recognition as "Croatan Indians" in 1885. They first petitioned the federal government for recognition in 1888, but were rejected due to the Bureau of Indian Affairs' lack of funding. In 1911, at the request of the tribe, the North Carolina General Assembly passed legislation changing their name to "Indians of Robeson County." In 1913, future North Carolina Governor Angus McLean supported renaming the tribe to "Cherokee Indians of Robeson County" despite objections from some Lumbee people. The tribe had previously petitioned for federal recognition as "Cherokee" Indians, but it was denied.

From 1913 to 1932, North Carolina legislators introduced bills in Congress to change the name of the people to Cherokee and gain federal recognition, but did not succeed.

In 1915, the report of Special Indian Agent O.M. McPherson of the Bureau of Indian Affairs, was sent to the North Carolina legislature. He primarily reported on the Cherokee in the state. He noted that the Indians of Robeson County had developed an extensive system of schools and a political organization. He thought that, as state-recognized Indians, they were eligible to attend federal Indian schools. But, as they were highly assimilated, spoke English, and already worked in the common state culture, he doubted that the federal Indian schools could meet their needs. Congress did not provide any additional funding to support education for Indians in North Carolina.

In 1924, the Cherokee Indians of North Carolina petitioned for federal recognition as "Siouan Indians"; their request was rejected by the Bureau of Indian Affairs. That same year, representative Homer L. Lyon introduced legislation to federally recognize the Lumbee as the "Cherokee Indians of Robeson and Adjoining Counties," but the bill failed after opposition from Commissioner of Indian Affairs Charles H. Burke. In 1932, senator Josiah W. Bailey introduced a bill to recognize the Lumbee as Cherokee, but it failed after opposition from the Cherokee Nation and the Eastern Band of Cherokee Indians.

==== Federally commissioned reports ====
In 1912, legislation was introduced to the US Senate to establish a school for the Indians of Robeson County. When the bill was sent to committee, it requested information from the Department of the Interior. The Indian Office sent Charles F. Pierce, the Supervisor of Indian Schools, to Robeson County to conduct a study of the tribe. Pierce reported that the state and county were providing funds to educate the 1,976 school-age Indian children. He also stated in his report that "one would readily class a large majority [of the Lumbee] as being at least three-fourths Indian.

On April 28, 1914, the Senate called for an investigation into the status and conditions of the Indians of Robeson and adjoining counties. The Indian Office sent Special Indian Agent O.M. McPherson to the county to obtain information regarding the educational system of the tribe. In his report, submitted to the Senate on January 4, 1915, he wrote:

"While these Indians are essentially an agricultural people, I believe them to be as capable of learning the mechanical trades as the average white youth. The foregoing facts suggest the character of the educational institution that should be established for them, in case Congress sees fit to make the necessary appropriation, namely the establishment of an agricultural and mechanical school, in which domestic science shall also be taught."

Anthropologist John R. Swanton reported on possible origins of the Indians of Robeson County in his work on Southeast Indians. He wrote:

"The evidence available thus seems to indicate that the Indians of Robeson County who have been called Croatan and Cherokee are descended mainly from certain Siouan tribes of which the most prominent were the Cheraw and Keyauwee, but they probably included as well remnants of the Eno, and Shakori, and very likely some of the coastal groups such as the Waccamaw and Cape Fears. It is not improbable that a few families or small groups of Algonquian or Iroquoian may have cast their lot with this body of people, but contributions from such sources are relatively insignificant. Although there is some reason to think that the Keyauwee tribe actually contributed more blood to the Robeson County Indians than any other, the name is not widely known, whereas that of the Cheraw has been familiar to historians, geographers and ethnologists in one form or another since the time of De Soto and has a firm position in the cartography of the region. The Cheraws, too, seem to have taken a leading part in opposing the colonists during and immediately after the Yamasee uprising. Therefore, if the name of any tribe is to be used in connection with this body of six or eight thousand people, that of the Cheraw would, in my opinion, be most appropriate."

In 1935, Indian Agent Fred Baker was sent to Robeson County in response to a proposed resettlement project for the Cherokee Indians of Robeson County. At the time, the people were attempting to organize as a tribe under the Indian Reorganization Act of 1934, which largely applied to Indians on reservations to encourage their self-government.

Baker reported:

I find that the sense of racial solidarity is growing stronger and that the members of this tribe are cooperating more and more with each other with the object in view of promoting the mutual benefit of all the members. It is clear to my mind that sooner of later government action will have to be taken in the name of justice and humanity to aid them.

D'Arcy McNickle, from the Bureau of Indian Affairs, came to Robeson County in 1936 to collect affidavits and other data from people registering as Indian under the Indian Reorganization Act of 1934. McNickle stated, "there are reasons for believing that until comparatively recently some remnant of language still persisted among these people."

In the 1960s, Smithsonian ethnologists William Sturtevant and Samuel Stanley described the Lumbee as "larger than any other Indian group in the United States except the Navajo", and estimated their population as 31,380 Lumbee (from North and South Carolina) in 1960.

==== Indian New Deal ====
The federal Indian Reorganization Act in 1934 was chiefly directed at Native American tribes on reservations. It encouraged them to re-establish self-government, which had been diminished since the founding of reservations and the supervision by the federal Bureau of Indian Affairs.

At this time, the Indians of Robeson County renewed their petition for federal recognition as a tribe. The Bureau of Indian Affairs (BIA) sent John R. Swanton, an anthropologist from the Bureau of American Ethnology, and the Indian Agent Fred Baker to evaluate the claim of the Indians of Robeson County to historical continuity as an identified Indian community. In 1934, the future Lumbee revived their claim to Cherokee identity, joining the National Congress of American Indians under the name, "Cherokee Indians of Robeson County."

Swanton speculated that the group were more likely descended in part from Cheraw and other eastern Siouan tribes, as these were the predominant Native American peoples historically in that area. The Indians of Robeson County split in terms of how they identified as Native Americans: one group supported the Cheraw theory of ancestry. The other faction believed they were descended from the Cherokee, although the tribe had historically occupied territory in the mountains and western part of the state rather than the area of Robeson County. North Carolina's politicians abandoned support for the federal recognition effort until the tribal factions agreed on their identity.

In 1952, under the leadership of D.F. Lowrie, the tribe voted to adopt the name "Lumbee". The North Carolina legislature recognized the tribe's name change to the "Lumbee Indians of North Carolina" in 1953. The tribe petitioned again for federal recognition.

==== Lumbee Act ====
In 1955, congressman F. Ertel Carlyle introduced The Lumbee Act to recognize the "Lumbee Indians of North Carolina." It was passed into by Congress as H.R. 4656 (Pub. L. 84–570, 70 Stat. 254) in 1956 and signed by President Dwight D. Eisenhower. The Senate inserted a compromise that withheld full recognition as a federally recognized tribe and prevented the tribe from being federally recognized or receiving federal benefits designated for tribal governments. The Lumbee Act designated the Indians of Robeson, Hoke, Scotland, and Cumberland counties as the "Lumbee Indians of North Carolina."

It provided further, "Nothing in this Act shall make such Indians eligible for any services performed by the United States for Indians because of their status as Indians.'" It also forbids a government-to-government relationship between the federal government and the Lumbee as well as forbidding them from applying through the BARS, the Bureau of Indian Affairs administrative process to gain recognition. This restriction as to eligibility for services was a condition which tribal representatives agreed to at the time in order to achieve status as a recognized tribe and have the Lumbee name recognized. The Lumbee had essentially assimilated into early colonial life prior to the formation of the United States. They lived as individuals, as did any other colonial and U.S. citizens. Lumbee spokesmen repeatedly testified at these hearings that they were not seeking federal financial benefits; they said they only wanted a name designation as Lumbee people.

=== Ku Klux Klan conflict ===
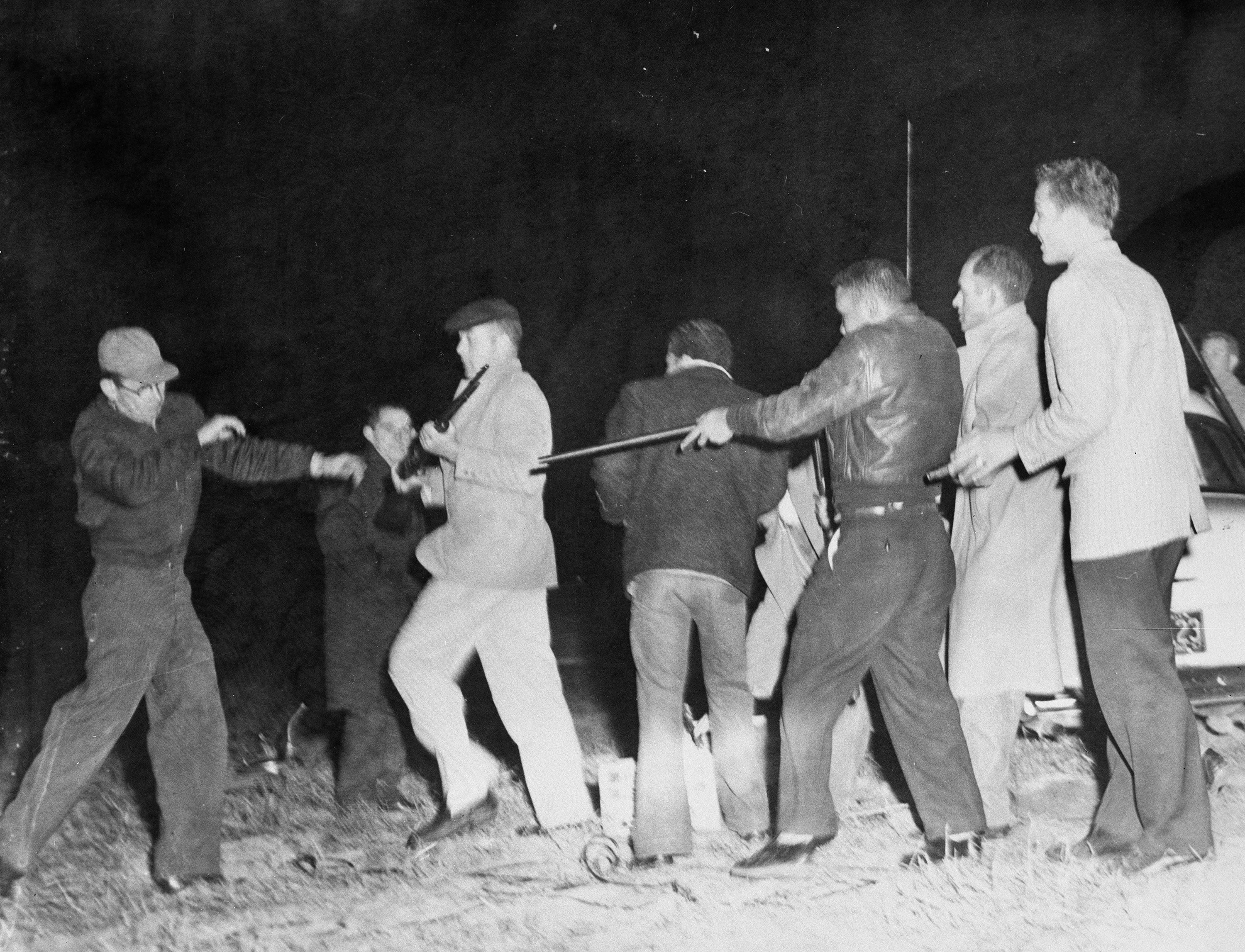
Lumbees fighting Klansmen at the Battle of Hayes Pond

During the 1950s, the Lumbee made nationwide news when they came into conflict with the Knights of the Ku Klux Klan, a white supremacist terrorist organization, then headed by Grand Dragon James W. "Catfish" Cole. Cole began a campaign of harassment against the Lumbee, claiming they were "mongrels and half-breeds" whose "race mixing" threatened to upset the established order of the segregated Jim Crow South. After giving a series of speeches denouncing the "loose morals" of Lumbee women, Cole burned a cross in the front yard of a Lumbee woman in St. Pauls, North Carolina, as a "warning" against "race mixing". Emboldened, Cole called for a Klan rally on January 18, 1958, near the town of Maxton. The Lumbee, led by veterans of the Second World War, decided to disrupt the rally.

The "Battle of Hayes Pond", also known as "the Klan Rout", made national news. Cole had predicted more than 5,000 Klansmen would show up for the rally, but fewer than 100 and possibly as few as three dozen attended. Approximately 500 Lumbee, armed with guns and sticks, gathered in a nearby swamp, and when they realized they possessed an overwhelming numerical advantage, attacked the Klansmen. The Lumbee encircled the Klansmen, opening fire and wounding four Klansmen in the first volley, none seriously. The remaining Klansmen panicked and fled. Cole was found in the swamps, arrested and tried for inciting a riot. The Lumbee celebrated the victory by burning Klan regalia and dancing around the open flames.

The Battle of Hayes Pond, which marked the end of Klan activity in Robeson County, is celebrated as a Lumbee holiday.

=== Petitioning for federal recognition ===
In 1987, the Lumbee petitioned the United States Department of the Interior for full federal recognition. This is a prerequisite to receive the financial benefits accorded federally recognized Native American tribes. The latter have generally been those tribes who had signed treaties with the federal government and had reservations established, and a history of a tribal relationship with the federal government. (Note: The petition's authors were Julian Pierce, Cynthia Hunt-Locklear, Wes White, Jack Campisi and Arlinda Locklear.) The petition was denied in 1989 because of the Lumbee Act.

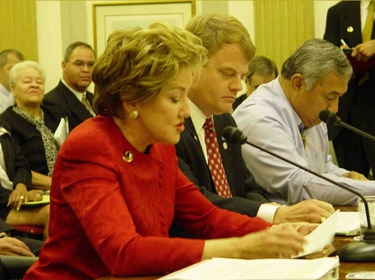
Senator Elizabeth Dole and Representative Mike McIntyre testifying at a congressional hearing on federal Lumbee recognition, 2003

The Lumbee resumed lobbying Congress, testifying in 1988, 1989, 1991 and 1993 in efforts to gain full federal recognition by congressional action. All of these attempts failed in the face of opposition by the Department of Interior, the recognized Cherokee tribes (including North Carolina's Eastern Band of Cherokee Indians), some of the North Carolina Congressional delegation, and some representatives from other states with federally recognized tribes. Some of the North Carolina delegation separately recommended an amendment to the 1956 Act that would enable the Lumbee to apply to the Department of Interior under the regular administrative process for recognition. In 2004 and 2006 the tribe made renewed bids for full recognition, to include financial benefits.

In 2007, US Senator Elizabeth Dole from North Carolina introduced the Lumbee Recognition Bill. It was not enacted. Lumbee Tribal Chairman Jimmy Goins appeared before the United States Senate Committee on Indian Affairs in September 2007 to lobby for federal recognition of the tribe.

In January 2009, US Representative Mike McIntyre introduced legislation (H.R. 31) to grant the Lumbee full federal recognition. The bill gained support of more than 180 co-sponsors, including both North Carolina US Senators, Richard Burr and Kay Hagan. In June 2009, the United States House of Representatives voted 240 to 179 for federal recognition for the Lumbee tribe, acknowledging that they are descendants of the historic Cheraw tribe. The bill went to the United States Senate. In October 2009, the United States Senate Committee on Indian Affairs approved a bill for federal recognition of the Lumbee that also included a no-gaming clause. The Senate adjourned for 2010 without taking action on the bill.

In 2021, Senator Brian Schatz of Hawaii sought a hearing on Lumbee federal recognition. In April 2021, US Representative G. K. Butterfield introduced legislation to grant the Lumbee full federal recognition (H.R. 2758). The bill passed the House of Representatives in November 2021. The Senate never acted. Another attempt at federal recognition passed the House but not the Senate. On December 17, 2024 Bruce Westerman of Arkansas introduced a bill sponsored by David Rouzer of Wilmington, North Carolina. The House approved 311-96, but the Senate would not be able to take action if Congress adjourned as planned.

==== 2020 presidential election ====
During the 2020 United States presidential election campaign, then-candidate Joe Biden announced, on October 8, 2020, his support for federal recognition of the Lumbee tribe by pledging his backing to the Lumbee Recognition Act. On October 21, 2020, President Donald Trump announced his support for federal recognition of the tribe via the same legislation. The following weekend, Trump held a rally in Robeson County to shore up support among Native Americans. During the rally, Trump stated that "[The] Lumbee Nation is forgotten no more!" Trump's rally was significant in that it was the first official visit to Robeson County by a sitting US President in history.

Historically most of Robeson County had trended Democratic, voting for Barack Obama by an 18 point margin in 2012. However, Donald Trump carried the county narrowly in 2016, winning by a 5 point margin over Hillary Clinton. In 2020, his margin of victory increased dramatically to an 18 point victory over Biden. Many attribute this swing in Trump's favor to his visit and explicit support for recognition of the tribe by the federal government.

=== Recognition process ===
On January 6, 2025, North Carolina lawmakers introduced the Lumbee Fairness Act. On January 23, 2025, Trump issued a memorandum stating that the Secretary of the Interior must submit a plan to the US Government on how to federally recognize the Lumbee Tribe of North Carolina. Michell Hicks, Chief of the Eastern Band of Cherokee Indians, urged for due diligence to protect the integrity of federal recognition, stating:

“Any process for evaluating Lumbee’s claims must be rooted in objective standards and a thorough, evidence-based review. Self-identification and sincere belief in Indian ancestry, while meaningful on a personal level, cannot mean tribal nationhood and sovereignty.”

Hicks claimed that experts had found no historical or genealogical evidence to verify the claims of the Lumbee.

==== Senate hearing on the Lumbee Fairness Act ====
On November 5, 2025, the Senate held a hearing on the Lumbee Fairness Act, in which they faced heavy criticism from other tribes. Tribal attorney Arlinda Locklear testified on why the Lumbee should not have to apply via the process laid out by the Bureau of Indian Affairs, and should instead by granted full federal recognition by Congress. Chief John Lowery stated that the Lumbee had had "at least nine" previous hearings before the committee, with Locklear stating

“All of those bills have failed, and let me tell you that has been a heartbreaking process for the Lumbee people.”

Lowery testified that the EBCI had guarded its status as the only federally recognized tribe in North Carolina, and waged a long campaign against Lumbee recognition. He noted an issue of the South Carolina Gazette reporting the execution of Winslow Driggers near Cheraw, SC in his claim of Cheraw ancestry of the Lumbee. He claimed in written testimony that cost to the federal government should not be an issue, due to the Lumbee already receiving federal funding from several departments, and internal regulations in the Indian Health Service.

Testimony by Chief Michell Hicks regarding the Lumbee Fairness Act

Michell Hicks, and Ben Barnes, Chief of the Shawnee Tribe of Oklahoma, both stated that an act of Congress was inappropriate for the federal recognition of the Lumbee. They questioned the changing names and tribal affiliations of the Lumbee in the past, with Hicks stating they had never shown descent from a historical tribe, and showed “a pattern of shifting due to circumstance.” Barnes noted the Lumbee lacked proven tribal descent, or a tribal language, and had identified as free persons under British and American censuses, rather than a tribal polity. Senator Markwayne Mullin questioned Hicks, posing that “you can’t look over there and say they’re not native. You’re telling me they’re not native faces.” Senator Catherine Cortez Masto stated that

“I don’t think, I should be looking out in my community saying just because you have brown skin, you’re undocumented. There has to be an evidence-based approach and that’s why it wasn’t created in Congress.”

Senator Lisa Murkowski questioned Hicks on why Congress should not be the channel the Lumbee should take, to which Hicks responded that the Lumbee case required expertise due to "clear gaps" in their history which Congress would not possess the ability to resolve. No action was taken as a result of the hearing.

==== NDAA bill and Federal recognition ====
The Lumbee Fairness Act was included in the 2026 National Defense Authorization Act, and passed both the House and Senate votes. On December 18, 2025, Donald Trump signed the Lumbee Fairness Act into law, making the Lumbee Tribe of North Carolina a federally recognized tribe.

== Theories of origins ==
=== Native American descent ===
==== Croatan and the Lost Colony of Roanoke ====
In 1888, Hamilton McMillan proposed the pre-Civil War free inhabitants of Robeson County were descendants of England's "Lost Colony of Roanoke", who intermarried with what he described as the "Croatan Indians." McMillan revised the novel "The White Doe Chase. A Legend of Olden Times" with the addition of colonists intermarrying with Native Americans. The Roanoke colony disappeared during a difficult winter, but the colonists reportedly left the word "Croatan" carved into a tree, hence the name MacMillan gave to the ancestors of the Lumbee. Sociolinguist Walt Wolfram suggests that identifying with the prestige of Roanoke settler origin served to elevate their sense of privilege though association with Europeans rather than Africans, while simultaneously maintaining a Native American identity.

McMillan's theory may have been part of a cynical effort to woo the ancestors of the Lumbee to the Democratic Party by creating a segregated Indian school system separate from the school system for African Americans.

By the early 1900s, Robeson County whites used "Cro" as a racial epithet to describe their "Indian" neighbors. The Lost Colony theory of origins fell out of favor in the early twentieth century. "Croatan" was dropped from their name and they became known as the "Indians of Robeson County" in 1911.

Lumbee historian Adolph Dial continued to advocate for the Lost Colony theory until his death in the 1990s. Lumbee historian Malinda Maynor Lowery "is highly skeptical" of the theory.

==== Cherokee descent ====
The ancestors of the Lumbee first began identifying as Cherokee in 1913, when they changed their name to the "Cherokee Indians of Robeson County." Four years earlier, they had changed their name from the "Croatan Indians" to the generic "Indians of Robeson County." But the Cherokee occupied territory much further to the west and in the mountains during the colonial era.

In his unpublished 1934 master's thesis, graduate student Clifton Oxendine theorized that the Lumbee descended from Cherokee. Citing "oral traditions," Oxendine suggested that the Lumbee were the descendants of Cherokee warriors who fought with the British under Colonel John Barnwell of South Carolina in the Tuscarora campaign of 1711–1713. He claimed the Cherokee settled in the swamps of Robeson County when the campaign ended.

The Oxendine theory of Cherokee origin has been uniformly rejected by mainstream scholars. First, no Cherokee warriors are listed in the record of Barnwell's company. The Lumbee do not speak Cherokee or any other Native American language, and Oxendine's claims of oral traditions are completely unsubstantiated; no such oral traditions survive or are documented by any other scholar.

The Lumbee have abandoned this theory in their documentation supporting their effort to obtain federal tribal recognition. The federally recognized Eastern Band of Cherokee Indians categorically rejects any connection to the Lumbee, dismissing the Oxendine claims as "absurd" and disputing even that the Lumbee qualify as Native American.

==== Cheraw descent ====
Indian agent McPherson theorized that they may be related to the defunct Cheraw, who had been reduced by war and disease to 50 or 60 individuals already living among the Catawba by 1768.

The 1915 McPherson Report said in reference to the Cheraw (quoting the Handbook of American Indians, 1906):

Their numbers in 1715, according to Rivers, was 510, but this estimate probably included the Keyauwee. Being still subject to attack by the Iroquois, they finally—between 1726 and 1739—became incorporated with the Catawba ... They are mentioned as with the Catawba but speaking their own distinct dialect as late as 1743 (Adair). The last notice of them in 1768, when their remnant, reduced by war and disease to 50 or 60, were still living with the Catawba.

The Catawba are a federally recognized tribe. The McPherson Report does not explain how or when the remaining four or five dozen Cheraw identified in 1768 separated from the Catawba and became the ancestors of the Lumbee.

==== Descent from multiple tribes ====
In 1933, John Swanton wrote that the Siouan-speaking Keyauwee and Cheraw of the Carolina Piedmont were the most likely Indian ancestors of the people known from 1885 to 1912 as Croatan Indians and later as the Indians of Robeson County. He suggested that surviving descendants of the Waccamaw and the Woccon likely lived in the central coastal region of North Carolina. In the 21st century, these tribes are extinct as groups, except for a small band of Waccamaw that live on Lake Waccamaw and have been recognized by the state.

Swanton traced the migration of Southeast tribes. In addition to the Keyauwee, Cheraw, Bear River, Waccamaw, and Woccon already mentioned, he noted that the Eno and Waxhaw migrated from Piedmont South Carolina northeast to the north-central part of North Carolina, then back south again to a point on the Pee Dee River just south of the border of the two Carolinas.

After repeated rejections under the Croatan, Cherokee and Cheraw labels, the proto Lumbee petitioned the United States Bureau of Indian Affairs in 1924 for recognition as "Siouan" Indians. This refers to groups speaking Siouan-Catawban languages, not the Sioux, an Indigenous people of the Great Plains. This petition was rejected largely on the grounds that Siouan-Catawban is a language family, not a tribe. Moreover, there was no record of the Lumbee or their ancestors having ever spoken a Siouan-Catawban or any other Native American language.

Lumbee historian Malinda Mayor Lowery, as well as the Lumbee tribe of North Carolina propose that the Lumbee people were most likely descended from the members of several other tribes who settled in the swamplands around Robeson County. Lowery argues that Cheraw, Saponi, Hatteras, Tuscarora and Cape Fear Indians settled in the area during the 18th and 19th centuries and adopted English as a lingua franca.

Historian Karen Blu mentions Swanton's thesis that remnant Indians from the once distinct tribal communities of the Cheraw, Keyauwee, Hatteras, Waxhaw, Sugaree, Eno and Shakori gathered together, and over time in a process of ethnogenesis, identified as a common people - but that this assumption is speculative, and based on the documentation of which tribes had lived in the area before. She states that there are no firm links between the groups mentioned and the Lumbee.

=== Free Black descent ===
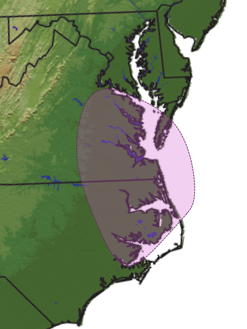
The Tidewater Region, within Virginia and North Carolina

Number of free Black people per County in Virginia and North Carolina in 1790. Robeson County and Hoke County were part of Bladen County at this time.

Some genealogical analysis and documentation indicate the founding lineages of the Lumbee may have been of free Black descent from the Tidewater Region. In Virginia, free Black communities had begun developing in the early 1700s. Several had begun voting by 1701, and owning land and living freely in the decades after. Communities formed on the frontier of settlement, expanding from Southampton, to Granville, to Robeson in North Carolina over time.

According to genealogical analysis, over 80% of "other free persons" in North Carolina during the census of 1790-1810 were of free Black people from communities in Virginia. By 1790, while free Black people were only 1.7% of North Carolina, they had become 5% of Northampton, Halifax, Bertie, Craven, Granville, Hertford, and Robeson Counties. Some families, such as the Bunch, Chavis, Gibson, and Gowen families, owned large amounts of slaves and land.

Opinions in Robeson County began to shift on the free Negro population, with one paper posting that "The County of Robeson is cursed with a free-coloured population that migrated originally from the districts round about the Roanoke and Neuse Rivers. They are generally indolent, roguish, improvident, and dissipated." According to genealogist Paul Heinegg, these aforementioned free Black settlers had migrated to historic Bladen County, which later split into a smaller Bladen County, and modern Robeson County. He states many families listed as "other free" in the census of 1790-1810 in Robeson are genealogically traceable back to families previously listed as "Negro" and "Mulatto" in Virginia and North Carolina, following the trend of other counties. These families include the Branch, Braveboy, Brooks, Carter, Chavis, Cumbo, Dunn, Evans, Gowen, Hammond, Hogg, Hunt, Jacobs, James, Johnston, Kersey, Locklear, Manuel, Newsom, Oxendine, Revell, Roberts, Sweat and Wilkins families.

In 1875 Mary C. Norment, a resident of Robeson wrote that the mixed-race population of Robeson County consisted of "free Negros or Mulattos" who had "married and intermixed with each other so often that the distinctive features of one was representative of all", which informed her belief that Robeson County was one of the largest free Black settlements in North Carolina. Free Black people in Robeson initially went to school, voted, and to church with the white population, until the Free Negro Codes of 1826-1850 in North Carolina curtailed their rights. In 1885, Hamilton McMillan helped them pass a law to have their own schools, as "Indians" rather than "free Negros". A parallel grant occurred in Person County where "old issue negros" (free Black people freed before the Civil War) were granted their own school, under the successive names "Mongolian", "Cuban", and finally "the Indian Race". This allowed them to maintain a school apart from the recent descendants of slaves. Legal scholar Daniel Sharfstein notes that "Native American identity came to represent a bridge to freedom and to whiteness, with the result that many people of African descent deliberately became Indians." Heinegg states that via genealogical analysis, the families seeking their own "Indian" schools in Robeson County were formerly labelled as free African American populations before the Free Negro Codes took effect.

=== Authenticity and doubts of origins ===
Due to their lack of evidence of Native American ancestry and other conventional Indigenous cultural markers such as a unique language, Lumbee people are often confronted with doubts concerning the validity of their claims to Indigenous status. Some white and black residents of Robeson County have expressed doubts about their origins, asserting that the Lumbee are descendants of white and black people who do not want to be viewed as black due to discrimination based on skin tone. Some federally recognized tribes have endorsed the extension of recognition to the Lumbee, while others have opposed it, accusing the Lumbee of making fraudulent claims to Indigenous ancestry.

Several tribes from the Western United States also promulgate the belief that the Lumbee are a mixed, mostly African-descent group. Some Lumbee report that they do not show any Native American ancestry on commercial genealogical DNA tests, with it being reported that according to this testing many families in Robeson County have no Native ancestry at all. Sharfstein states that widespread claims of Native American lineage in African-Americans are uncorroborated by admixture studies, also noting that the very large amount of white people who claim Native ancestry could plausibly suggest an entirely different ancestry. Historian Malinda Maynor Lowery, a member of the Lumbee Tribe of North Carolina, criticized the usefulness of such tests, stating that the testing companies lack base samples of the Lumbee's Indigenous ancestors' DNA with which the results can be compared. Some Lumbee report that the doubts about their status have caused emotional and psychological harm in their community.

Scholar Renate Bartl states the Lumbee are a circumstantial tri-racial isolate, adopting Native American identity during their history. She notes they switched through multiple identities throughout their history, before adopting the identity of Lumbee, which she states is fictitious. In 1985, the historian Jan Vansina stated they did not differ culturally from the white people in their area. He concluded their Native identity only existed due to them seeing themselves as Native, and that they had convinced local white leadership as well. Unlike the contested identity claims of the Lumbee and other racial isolate communities, the identity of Black Indians, including Black Seminoles, are not contested.

== Culture and traditions ==
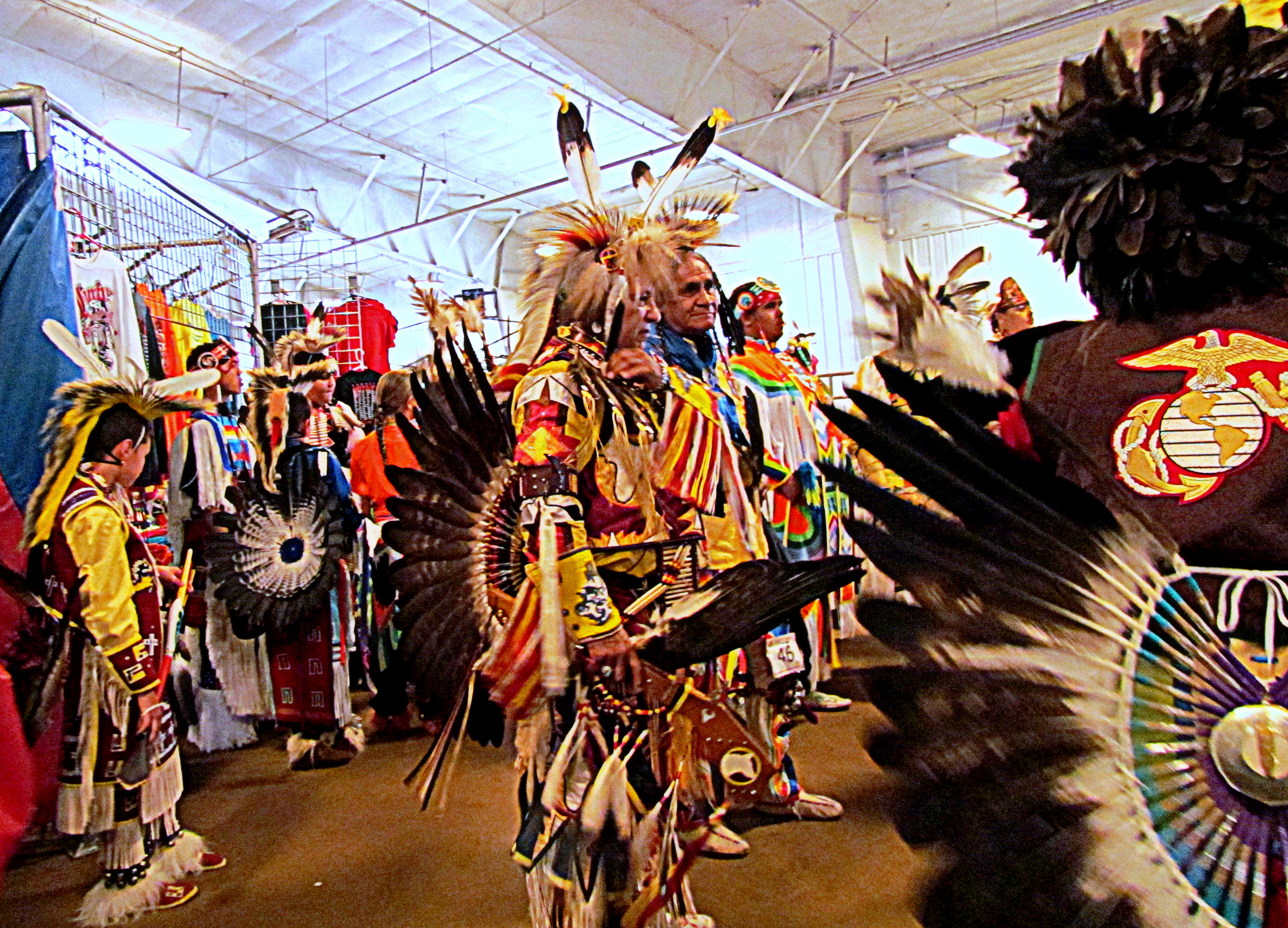
Lumbees at a pow wow in Lumberton, 2015

=== Surnames ===
Locklear, Oxendine, Lowry, Hunt, Chavis, Brayboy, Freeman and Bullard are common Lumbee surnames.

=== Language ===
Lumbee English
- (spurious)
- Native to: United States
- Region: North Carolina
- Ethnicity: Lumbee
- Language family: Indo-European: Germanic; West Germanic; North Sea Germanic; Anglo–Frisian; Anglic; English; North American English; American English; Older Southern American English; Lumbee English

Language codes
- ISO 639-3: (lmz deprecated in 2020 due to spurious)
- Glottolog: lumb1237

Lumbee people speak both mainstream varieties of English and a vernacular form, Lumbee English. The latter is not a Native American language, but rather a form of American Indian English. In 2020, the ISO 639-3 language code lmz was retired from use, as it was determined that no separate Lumbee language has ever existed. Linguists have speculated that the ancestors of the Lumbees had been Native peoples who had originally spoken the Cheraw language prior to adopting English sometime before the early 18th century, however it is difficult to say what language they may have spoken, as there were many other language families present in the area and Cheraw is unattested. Their dialect of English, however is related most closely to those spoken by settlers from the Outer Banks and Appalachia.

It has been theorized that Lumbee ancestors encountered English-speaking European settlers and adopted their language much earlier than other Native American groups. Alternately, some have proposed that unlike neighboring groups, the Lumbee spoke English at the time of contact, as they have showed no evidence of a language tradition other than English. The Lumbee Act of 1956 specifically mentioned the dialect as a defining attribute of the people. English settlers reported being surprised at the presence of a large civilized, slave-owning, English-speaking tribe of Indians. The Lumbees' lack of a Native American language led to extra difficulty in gaining federal recognition.

Lumbee dialectal English descends from the English spoken by the British English, Highland Scots, and Scots-Irish. Probably due to this heritage, it shares similarities with the High Tider accent found in the Outer Banks, namely in use of the /ɒɪ/ sound where other English speakers use /aɪ/, the use of the word mommuck ('to mess up'), and the grammatical use of weren't (e.g. "she weren't here"). Lumbee dialect also makes use of several unique words and phrases: chauld ('embarrassed'); on the swamp ('in the neighborhood'); juvember (sling shot); and bog (a serving of chicken and rice). Grammatically, Lumbee dialect employs the word bes as a verb form (e.g. "it bes really crowded"). There is a variation in the use of these elements among Lumbee people; some frequently use most of the vernacular's unique characteristics, while others use few of them but easily understand their meaning. The vernacular has also evolved over time, with older speakers frequently using the /ɒɪ/ sound and a-prefixing verbs, while the grammatical use of weren't has been retained and strengthened in use among younger speakers.

=== Lumbee Homecoming ===
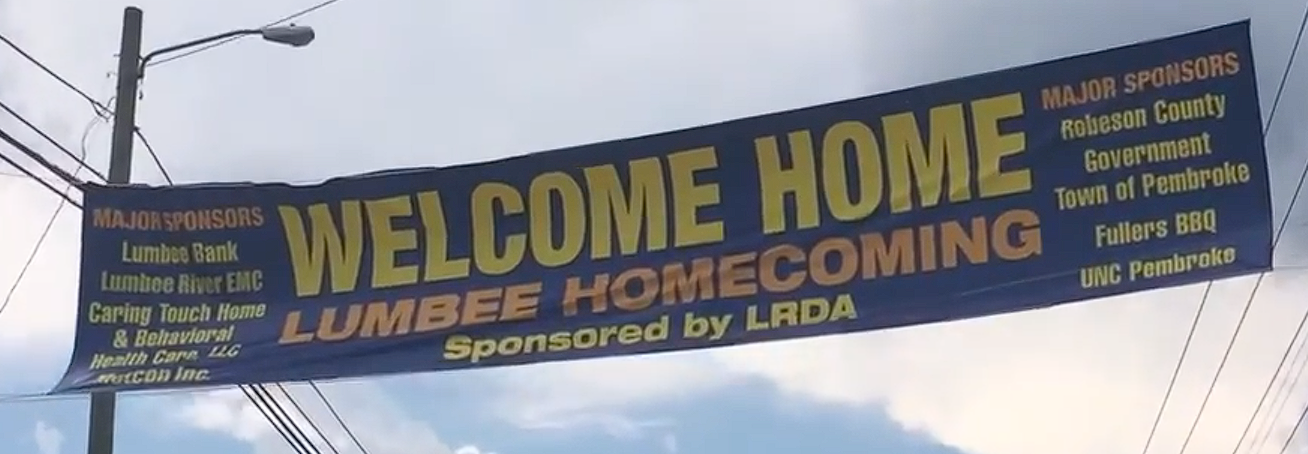
Banner for Lumbee Homecoming.

Lumbee Homecoming is a celebration held annually in Pembroke since 1968. Homecoming is important in bringing together members of families, many from great distances, for a weeklong celebration of Lumbee culture. Festivities include a parade, a pow wow, pageants, and other cultural events. 2018 marked the 50th anniversary of the homecoming and saw crowds of over 20,000 spectators, including the Governor of North Carolina, Roy Cooper.

=== Communities ===
According to Lumbeetribe.com, "Lumbee communities were linked together by their extensive kinship ties, church affiliations, their sense of themselves as Indians, and their control of their educational system," and "Communities are basically self-governing. One form of self-governance in the early 20th century was exhibited by a fraternal organization known as the Red Men's Lodge. By 1914, lodges existed in Prospect, Magnolia, Pembroke, Saddletree, Oxendine, and Union Chapel. Lodge members maintained social order, carried out ceremonies, marched in parades, and conducted funerals."

=== Lumbee patchwork ===
In the late 19th century, Maggie Lowry Locklear, daughter of Henry Berry Lowry, created a patchwork quilt inspired by the longleaf pine, which "strongly resembled" the African-American created "Pine Burr" Quilts of Gee's Bend, with a slight modification. Her quilt is in the collection of the Museum of the Southeast American Indian at the University of North Carolina at Pembroke.

In 1993, Hayes Alan Locklear designed a dress, which was sewn by Kat Littleturtle for Miss Lumbee Natascha Wagoner, who was chosen as the 8th Miss Indian USA. The dress featured a pinecone patchwork pattern inspired by Maggie Lowry Locklear's quilt. Since then, Lumbee women have adopted this pinecone patchwork dress style as the signature Lumbee dress.

=== Cuisine ===
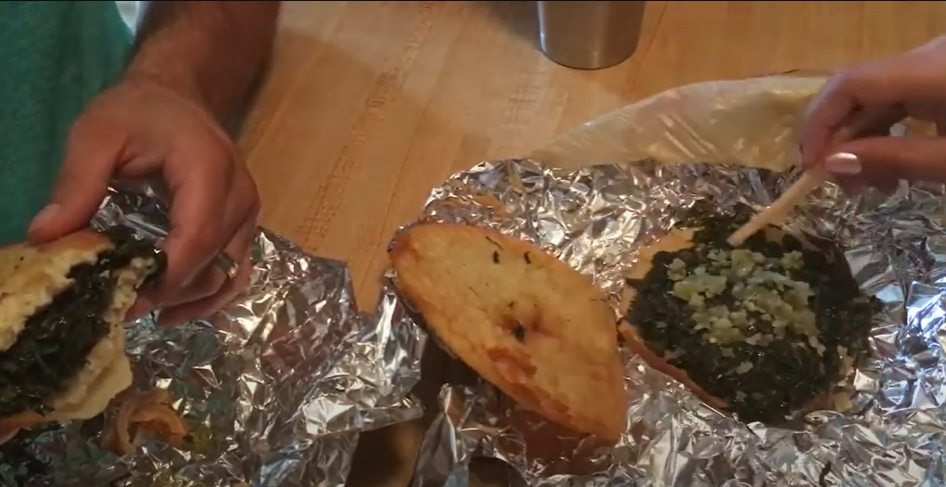
Collard sandwiches served at a Lumbee Homecoming

Traditional Lumbee cuisine heavily intersects with Southern cuisine. Chicken and pastry is a mainstay of Lumbee food, as is cornbread. The collard sandwich—consisting of fried cornbread, collard greens, and fatback—is a popular dish among the Lumbee in Robeson County. It is sometimes served with chow-chow.

=== Religion ===
Today the Lumbee primarily practice Protestantism, and attending church is an important social activity. Churches have Sunday schools, youth organizations, senior citizens' programs, Bible study programs, and choir practices. Gospel songs are popular. Ministers are highly respected. When a sizeable number of Lumbee people move to a city, they tend to settle in a particular section or neighborhood and establish a church. This took place in Lumbee communities in Baltimore, Greensboro, Fayetteville, Charlotte, and Claxton, Georgia.

A study has documented Lumbee Methodism back to 1787. Lumbees created two church conferences of Indian congregations — the Burnt Swamp Baptist Association, founded around 1880, and the Lumber River Conference of the Holiness Methodist Church in 1900. In 1984 Bruce Barton documented 104 Lumbee churches. Prospect Community Church, with 1,008 members in 2017, has purportedly the largest congregation of Native Americans in the United States.

== Lumbee Tribe of North Carolina ==
The Lumbee Tribe of North Carolina is one of two federally recognized Native American tribes in North Carolina. They participate at the state level in many ways, including in the North Carolina Commission of Indian Affairs. They also participate in such national organizations as the National Congress of American Indians and the National Indian Education Association.

According to its constitution, adopted in 2000, the Lumbee tribal government is organized into three branches: the tribal chairperson (executive), the 21-member Tribal Council (legislative), and Supreme Court (judicial). The tribal chairperson and the Tribal Council are elected to three-year terms.

The current administration includes:

- Chairman: John Lowery
- Administrator: Ricky Harris
- Executive Administrative Assistant: Belinda Brewer
- Enrollment director: Reena Locklear

== Unrecognized organizations ==
Some unrecognized organizations identify as being Lumbee. One, the United Lumbee Nation of North Carolina and America, based in Exeter, California, petitioned for federal recognition in 1980. The final determination was that the group "does not exist as an Indian tribe" and that they did not descend from any Lumbee community.

The Texas Lumbee are a group of Redbones, who claim descent from the Lumbee of North Carolina. They conclude they descend from the Lumbee of North Carolina due to possessing the surnames Nash, Johnson, and Revell. They are also known as the United Lumbee Nation: Cougar Band, and are unrecognized by the state of Texas.

== See also ==
- List of notable Lumbee
- Brandywine people
  - Piscataway Indian Nation and Tayac Territory
  - Piscataway-Conoy Tribe of Maryland
- Brass Ankles
  - Wassamasaw Tribe of Varnertown Indians
- Delaware Moors
  - Lenape Indian Tribe of Delaware
  - Nanticoke Indian Association
  - Nanticoke Lenni-Lenape Tribal Nation
- Dominickers
- Melungeons
  - Carmel Melungeons
- Ramapough Mountain People
- Louisiana Redbones
- Free Black people

== Works cited ==
=== Books ===
- Blu, Karen I. (1980). The Lumbee problem: the making of an American Indian people. Cambridge University Press. ISBN 978-0-521-22525-0. OL 4409557M.
- Dial, Adolph L.; Eliades, David K. (1996). The only land I know: a history of the Lumbee Indians (1st ed.). Syracuse University Press. ISBN 978-0-8156-0360-3. OL 796069M.
- Emanuel, Ryan E. (2024). On the swamp: fighting for Indigenous environmental justice. Chapel Hill: University of North Carolina Press. ISBN 978-1-4696-7831-3.
- Evans, William McKee (1971). To die game; the story of the Lowry band, Indian guerrillas of Reconstruction. Baton Rouge, Louisiana State University Press. ISBN 978-0-8071-0816-1.
- Gross, Ariela (2008). What Blood Won't Tell A History of Race on Trial in America. Cambridge, MA: Harvard University Press. ISBN 978-0-674-03130-2.
- Hauptman, Laurence M. (1996). Between two fires : American Indians in the Civil War. New York; London : Free Press Paperbacks. ISBN 978-0-684-82668-4.
- Hashaw, Tim (2006). Children of Perdition. Melungeons and the Struggle of Mixed America. Macon, GA: Mercer University Press. pp. 28–29, 31–32, 35, 52, 59. ISBN 9780881460742. "The Angolan-American Emanuel Driggers of King's Creek knew and did business with the Angolan-American Anthony Johnson of the Pungoteague.*' The Driggers (aka Driggus) in Accomack County on the Eastern Shore knew the mixed families of Gowen, Cornish, and Sweat on the Virginia mainland, all before 1670. Before 1700, their families intermarried, adopted each other's children, purchased each other from slavery and traded cattle."
- Heinegg, Paul (2001). Free African Americans of North Carolina, Virginia, and South Carolina From the Colonial Period to About 1820 4th Edition. Vol. I. Baltimore, MD: Genealogical Publishing Co. ISBN 0-8063-5110-1.
- Heinegg, Paul (2021). Free African Americans of North Carolina, Virginia, and South Carolina from the Colonial Period to About 1820. Sixth Edition. Vol. I - Families Abel to Drew. Baltimore, MD: Genealogical Publishing Company. ISBN 9780806359298.
- Hoffman, Margaret M. (1982). Colony of North Carolina (1735–1764), Abstracts of Land Patents, Volume I. Roanoke Rapids, North Carolina: Roanoke News Company. OL 3516045M.
- Lowery, Malinda Maynor (2018). The Lumbee Indians An American Struggle. Chapel Hill, NC: The University of North Carolina Press. ISBN 9781469646381.
- Rights, Douglas L. (1957). The American Indian in North Carolina (2nd ed.). Winston-Salem: John F. Blair. OL 6223628M.
- Swanton, John R. The Indians of the Southeastern United States (1946). Smithsonian Libraries and Archives, Natural History Building, Washington DC: Smithsonian Institution Press. ISBN 0-87474-895-X.
- Swanton, John R. The Indian Tribes of North America (1952). Smithsonian Libraries and Archives, Natural History Building, Washington DC: Smithsonian Institution Press. ISBN 0-87474-179-3.
- Ross, Thomas E. (1999). American Indians in North Carolina: Geographic Interpretations. Southern Pines: Karo Hollow Press. ISBN 978-1-891026-01-0.
- Townsend, George Alfred (1872). The Swamp Outlaws, or, The North Carolina Bandits: Being a Complete History of the Modern Rob Roys and Robin Hoods. New York: Robert M. DeWitt.
- Wolfram, Walt; Dannenberg, Clare; Knick, Stanley; Oxendine, Linda (2002). Fine in the World: Lumbee Language in Time and Place. Raleigh: North Carolina State University. ISBN 1-885647-53-0.
- Wolfram, Walt; Reaser, Jeffrey (2014). Talkin' Tar Heel : How Our Voices Tell the Story of North Carolina. Chapel Hill: The University of North Carolina Press. ISBN 978-1-4696-1437-3.

=== Journal articles ===
- Boulware, Tyler (November 2004). "'A dangerous sett of horse-thieves and vangrants': Outlaws of the Southern Frontier During the Revolutionary Era". Eras Journal (6). Monash University.
- Demarce, Virginia Easley (1993). "Looking at legends: Lumbee and Melungeon: applied genealogy and the origins of tri-racial isolate settlements". National Genealogical Society Quarterly. 81 (1): 24–45.
- Gross, Ariela (2007). "'Of Portuguese Origin': Litigating Identity and Citizenship among the 'Little Races' in Nineteenth-Century America". Law and History Review. 25 (3). American Society for Legal History: 467–512. doi:10.1017/S0738248000004259. JSTOR 27641498.
- Locklear, Lawrence T. (2010). "Down by the Ol' Lumbee: An Investigation into the Origin and Use of the Word "Lumbee" Prior to 1952". Native South. 3 (1): 103–117. doi:10.1353/nso.2010.0004. S2CID 154923676. Project MUSE 392514.
- Street, James Ennis (2022). "Federal Recognition of Native American Tribes in the United States and the International Right to Self-Determination: Why Congress should Exercise its Constitutional Authority to Federally Recognize the Lumbee Tribe" (Comment). Duke Journal of Comparative and International Law. 33 (121): 121–149.
- Bartl, Renate (2021). American Tri-Racials: African-Native Contact, Multi-Ethnic Native American Nations, and the Ethnogenesis of Tri-Racial Groups in North America (PDF) (PhD thesis). Munich: Ludwig-Maximilians-Universität München. doi:10.5282/edoc.26874 – via Electronic Theses of LMU Munich.
- Kearns, Andre (2022). "A Cumbo Family Lineage: Connecting The Dots". Journal of the Afro-American Historical and Genealogical Society. 38. Afro-American Historical and Genealogical Society: 22–29. ISSN 0272-1937.
- Estes, Roberta J.; Goins, Jack H.; Ferguson, Penny; Crain, Janet Lewis (2011). "Melungeons, a multi-ethnic population" (PDF). Journal of Genetic Genealogy. 7.

=== Primary sources ===
- Campisi, Jack (July 12, 2006). "Testimony before the Committee on Indian Affairs United States Senate, Legislative hearing on S. 660. 12 July 2006" (PDF). Archived from the original (PDF) on January 7, 2010.
- Knick, Stanley G. (1988). Robeson Trails Archaeological Survey: Reconnaissance in Robeson County. University of North Carolina at Pembroke: Native American Resource Center.
- Knick, Stanley G. (1993). Robeson Crossroads Archaeological Survey: Intensive Testing. University of North Carolina at Pembroke: Native American Resource Center.
- Knick, Stanley (2000). The Lumbee in context: toward an understanding. University of North Carolina at Pembroke: Native American Resource Center.
- McMillan, Hamilton (1888). Sir Walter Raleigh's lost colony. An historical sketch of the attempts of Sir Walter Raleigh to establish a colony in Virginia, with the traditions of an Indian tribe in North Carolina. Indicating the fate of the colony of Englishmen left on Roanoke Island in 1587. Wilson, North Carolina: Advance Presses.
- McPherson, O.M. online text Report on Condition and Tribal Rights of the Indians of Robeson and Adjoining Counties of North Carolina, 63rd Congress, 3rd session, January 5, 1915. Senate Document 677 (This was submitted to the legislature of North Carolina, as they were considering issues related especially to the Cherokee and other tribal groups).
- Oxendine, Clifton. A Social and Economic History of the Indians of Robeson County North Carolina, unpublished M.A. thesis, George Peabody College for Teachers, 1934.
- Thomas, Robert K. (1987). A Report on Research of Lumbee Origins. Pembroke: Lumbee River Legal Services. The Lumbee petition. Prepared in cooperation with the Lumbee Tribal Enrollment Office. Julian T. Pierce and Cynthia Hunt-Locklear, authors. Jack Campisi and Wesley White, consultants.
- U.S. Bureau of the Census. The First Census of the U.S.: 1790. Heads of Families at the First Census of the United States: North Carolina. Washington, DC: Government Printing Office, 1908.
