= Native Americans in Wisconsin =

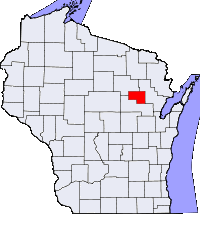

Total population
- 48,468 people (2020)

Languages
- Native American languages, American Indian English

Religion
- Native American religion, Native American Church

Wisconsin has 11 federally recognized Native American tribes belonging to three primary linguistic families: Algonquian, Siouan, and Iroquoian.

== See also ==
- History of Wisconsin
