= Prospect, North Carolina =

- CDP
- Location within the state of North Carolina
- Coordinates: 34°44′09″N 79°13′31″W
- Country: United States
- State: North Carolina
- County: Robeson

Area
  - Total: 3.93 sq mi (10.17 km^{2})
  - Land: 3.93 sq mi (10.17 km^{2})
  - Water: 0 sq mi (0.00 km^{2})
- Elevation: 187 ft (57 m)

Population (2020)
  - Total: 873
  - Density: 222.2/sq mi (85.81/km^{2})
- Time zone: UTC-5 (EST)
  - Summer (DST): UTC-4 (EDT)
- FIPS code: 37-53950
- GNIS feature ID: 2403453

Prospect is a census-designated place (CDP) in Robeson County, North Carolina, United States. The population was 873 at the 2020 census.

== History ==
Located due northeast of Pembroke, Prospect is a traditionally Methodist community, with its church members largely becoming representatives for the entirety of the American Indian-Methodist community. Prospect is noted for one of its native sons, Adolph Dial, whose contributions to American Indian Studies have led to an heightened awareness of the local Lumbee Tribe and Native Americans throughout the Southeastern United States.

== Geography ==
According to the United States Census Bureau, the CDP has a total area of 2.7 square miles (7.0 km^{2}), all land.

The Prospect community is general considered to cover as far east as Preston and Red Hill Roads and as far north as Old Maxton/Red Spring Rd.

== Demographics ==
Historical population
| Census | Pop. | Note | %± |
|---|---|---|---|
| 2020 | 873 | | — |
U.S. Decennial Census

As of the census of 2000, there were 690 people, 239 households, and 183 families residing in the CDP. The population density was 255.8 inhabitants per square mile (98.8/km^{2}). There were 248 housing units at an average density of 91.9 per square mile (35.5/km^{2}). The racial makeup of the CDP was:

- 96.23% Native American
- 2.03% White
- 0.14% African American
- 0.14% Pacific Islander
- 0.29% from other races
- 1.16% from two or more races.
- Hispanic or Latino of any race were 1.59% of the population.

There were 239 households, out of which 38.9% had children under the age of 18 living with them, 52.7% were married couples living together, 17.2% had a female householder with no husband present, and 23.4% were non-families. 20.9% of all households were made up of individuals, and 4.6% had someone living alone who was 65 years of age or older. The average household size was 2.89 and the average family size was 3.38.

In the CDP, the population was spread out, with 27.7% under the age of 18, 12.2% from 18 to 24, 30.6% from 25 to 44, 21.0% from 45 to 64, and 8.6% who were 65 years of age or older. The median age was 33 years. For every 100 females, there were 87.0 males. For every 100 females age 18 and over, there were 89.0 males.

The median income for a household in the CDP was $34,038, and the median income for a family was $42,143. Males had a median income of $31,583 versus $11,705 for females. The per capita income for the CDP was $11,359. About 20.1% of families and 21.7% of the population were below the poverty line, including 23.9% of those under age 18 and 13.2% of those age 65 or over.

== Origin ==
Many believe the origin of the Prospect community began when Preston Locklear claimed large swaths of land along what is known today as the Long Swamp.

Dr. Peter H. Wood lists Preston Locklear as a Tuscarora in his 1992 report "Tuscarora Roots". In 1992 there were about 4,000 Tuscaroras in Robeson County, NC. Locklear is listed as a founder of the University of North Carolina at Pembroke in The Museum of the Southeast American Indian.

== Churches in Prospect ==
Unlike the majority of Robeson County, the boundary of Prospect Community contains almost exclusively Methodist churches; the Methodist churches included within Prospect are Prospect United Methodist Church, Prospect Methodist Church, New Prospect Church, and New Prospect Methodist Church. Prospect United Methodist Church was itself founded by the Reverend W. L. Moore, the grandfather of Adolph Dial, founder of the American Indian Studies department at the University of North Carolina at Pembroke. Notably, Island Grove Baptist Church and Preston Gospel Chapel are the only non-Methodist churches in the community. Island Grove having broken-off from the theology to join the Burnt Swamp Baptist Association in 1955. Preston Gospel Chapel was originally called Doogle Hill and was located about a half mile east of the current location. It was established by the Scottish around 1875 as part of the Assembly Movement. Preston's original sanctuary was built in 1948. The present sanctuary was built in the late 1970s with the addition of a fellowship hall and small apartment for visiting preachers in the 1990s.

== Importance of Prospect United Methodist Church ==
The pillar of Prospect community is Prospect United Methodist Church, or as it's been known since it first appeared in the Wilmington Star in 1871, Prospect Church. The importance of Prospect Church to the community is best told through the vast assembly of its buildings, spanning a distance of 150 yards along W.L. Moore Road; this series of buildings, known as the "Temple" serves the largest congregation of Native Americans in the United States. The construction of the church, which would become the basis for the founding of Prospect Community, was due in large part to the efforts of local farmers in the area, allowing them to come together relative to their shared space. Over the course of the years major construction projects leading to new buildings were completed in 1865, 1876, 1895, 1946, 1961, 1970, 1976, 1987 and 1989. Though no longer standing, the original structure built in 1865 and the second structure built in 1876, were both made of logs and pegs, with the 1865 structure also serving as a single-room schoolhouse. The 1895 assembly, the last structure to be made out of timber, still stands today behind Moore's Chainsaw. The church is now the main producer of spokespeople for Lumbee Methodist, with members attending national conferences as representatives and delegates for the American Indian-Methodist community. The church also has had an active role in the community's schools and education, with a daily worship service offered by the church to local high school students, and the establishment of the Anderson Scholarship Fund to help benefit those who pursue church vocations as a result of being a part of the youth services.

== Adolph Dial ==
A notable member of Prospect Methodist Church, Adolph Dial was the Founding Chairman of the Department of American Indian Studies at the University of North Carolina at Pembroke. Born in Prospect in 1922 to Noah and Mary Ellen Dial, Dial would become a leading authority in academia for not only the Lumbee tribe, but also among North Carolinian and national historians in the field of Native American studies. Though Dial gained statewide recognition soon after his employment at the University of North Carolina at Pembroke in 1958, Dial grew to national prominence during his tenure on the American Indian Policy Review Commission. In 1971, the Ford Foundation provided Dial and fellow history professor at UNC-P, David Eliades a great for continued research on the Lumbee Indians—this in turn led to the publication of the 1975 ethnography, The Only Land I Know: A History of the Lumbee Indians, an expansive history of the tribe covering its history from colonialism through the modern day. Dial's contributions have led to the establishment of scholarly awards in his name at the University of North Carolina at Pembroke, as well the naming of the Dial Humanities Building on the school's campus.

Adolph Dial believed he was descended from John White's Lost Colonists, specifically Virginia Dare.

== Notable person ==
- Jimmy Goins, Chairman of the Lumbee Tribe (2004–2010)
- Chip Cavan
