= Native Americans in North Dakota =

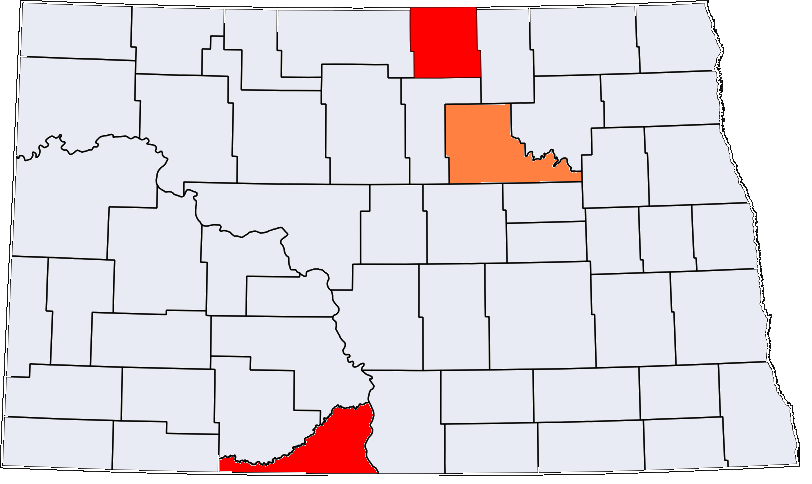

Total population
- 1.1% (2020)

Languages
- Native American languages, American Indian English

Religion
- Native American religion, Native American Church

Indigenous peoples in North Dakota make up approximately 5% of the state's total population, with more than 30,000 individuals affiliated with five federally recognized tribes. The main tribal nations present in the state include the Mandan, Hidatsa, and Arikara Nation (MHA Nation), Spirit Lake Nation, Standing Rock Sioux Tribe, Turtle Mountain Band of Chippewa Indians, and Sisseton-Wahpeton Oyate.

== See also ==
- History of North Dakota
