= Native Americans in Michigan =

Total population
- 61,261 (2020)

Languages
- Native American languages, American Indian English

Religion
- Native American religion, Native American Church

Michigan was initially settled by three Anishinaabe Native American nations that form the Council of Three Fires: the Ojibwe, the Odawa and the Potawatomi. During the late 18th and 19th centuries, the Council of Three Fires engaged in negotiations for a series of treaties with representatives of the United States government.

== See also ==
- History of Michigan
