= Native Americans in New Mexico =

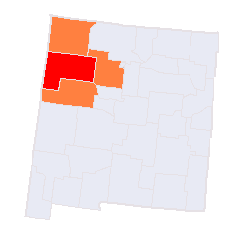

Total population
- 1.1% (2020)

Languages
- Native American languages, American Indian English

Religion
- Native American religion, Native American Church

New Mexico hosts 23 sovereign Native American tribes, which comprise 19 Pueblos, the Navajo Nation, and three Apache Nations: Jicarilla, Mescalero, and Fort Sill.

== Reservations ==
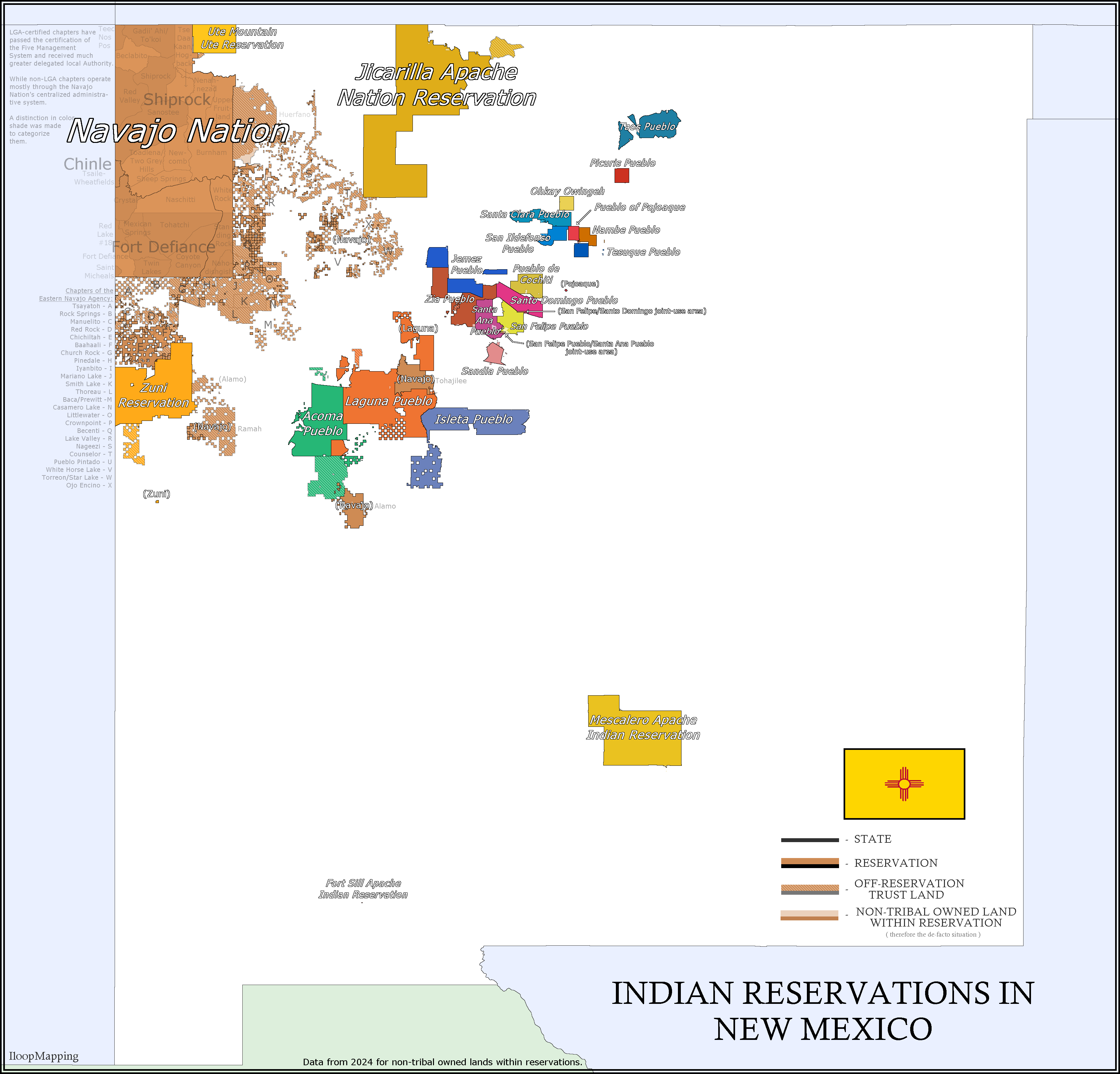
Map of Indian reservations in New Mexico

== See also ==
- History of New Mexico
