= Philadelphus, North Carolina =

Philadelphus
- Census-designated place
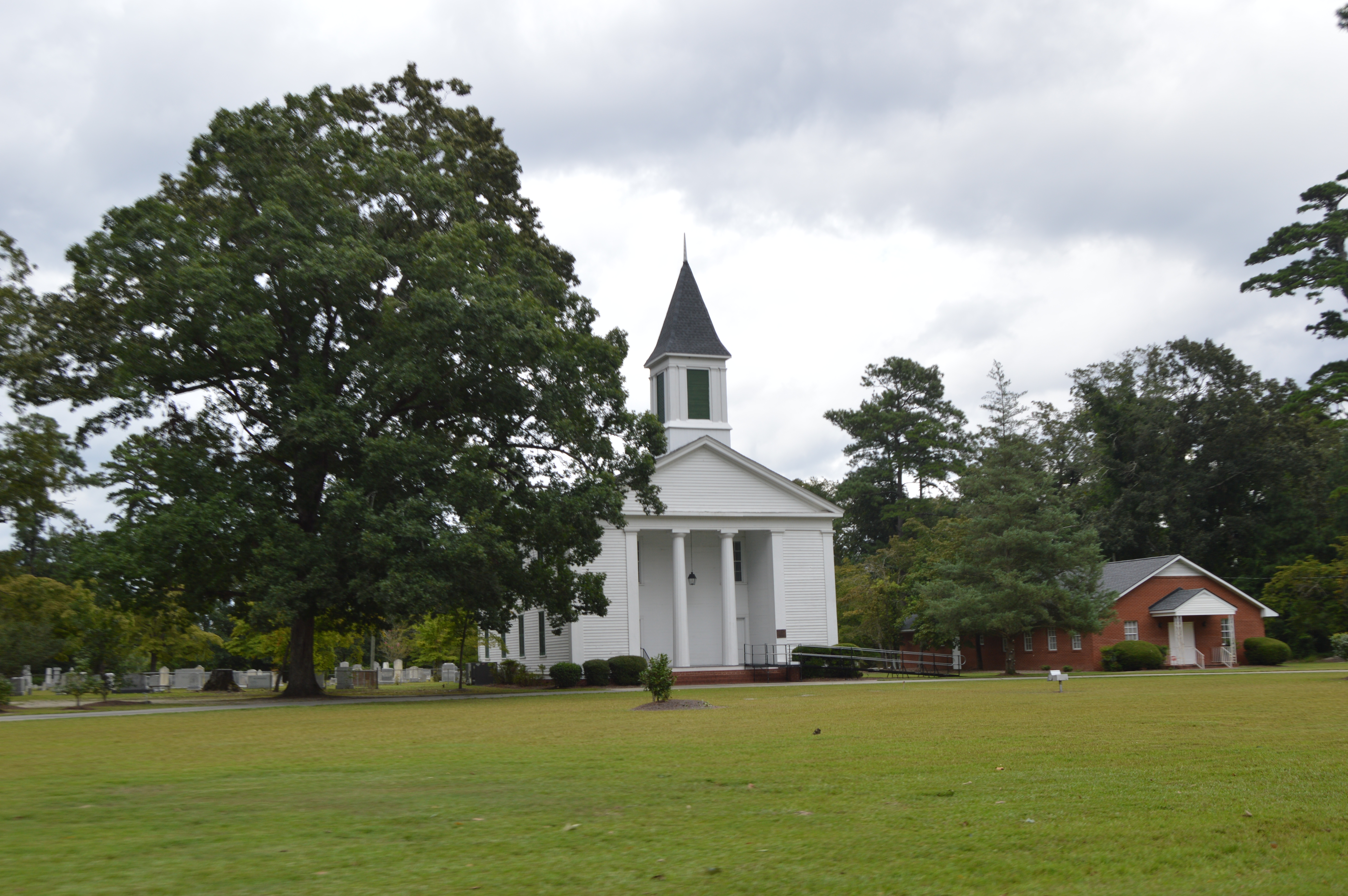
- Philadelphus Presbyterian Church

- Location within North Carolina
- Coordinates: 34.759°N 79.172°W
- Country: United States of America
- State: North Carolina
- County: Robeson County

Philadelphus is a census-designated place (CDP) in Robeson County, North Carolina, United States. The community is located between the towns of Pembroke and Red Springs. It was established between 1796 and 1799.

== Notable person ==
- Jimmy Goins – Chairman of the Lumbee Tribe (2004–2010)
