= Walt Wolfram =

American sociolinguist (born 1941)

- Born: February 15, 1941 (age 85); Philadelphia, Pennsylvania, U.S.
- Occupation: Professor of English Linguistics
- Known for: Sociolinguistics; Variationist sociolinguistics

Academic background
- Education: Wheaton College (B.A.); Hartford Seminary Foundation (M.A.) (Ph.D.)
- Doctoral advisor: Roger Shuy
- Website: chass.ncsu.edu/people/wolfram/

Walt Wolfram (/ˈwʊlfrəm/ WUUL-frəm; born February 15, 1941) is an American sociolinguist specializing in social and ethnic dialects of American English. He was one of the early pioneers in the study of urban African American English through his work in Detroit in 1969. He is the William C. Friday Distinguished University Professor at North Carolina State University.

Since the 1960s, Wolfram has authored or co-authored more than 20 books and more than 300 articles on variation in American English. He was an active participant in the 1996 debate surrounding the Oakland Ebonics controversy, supporting the legitimacy of African American English as a systematic language system. In addition to African American English, Wolfram has written extensively about Appalachian English, Puerto Rican English, Lumbee English, and many other dialects of North Carolina, particularly those of rural, isolated communities such as Ocracoke Island.

== Biography ==
Walt Wolfram was born in Philadelphia, Pennsylvania, in 1941. His parents were German immigrants. He attended Olney High School, where he played baseball, basketball, and football, graduating in 1959. He received his B.A. in anthropology (Greek) in 1963 from Wheaton College, where he played football and basketball. He received his M.A. in linguistics (1966), and his Ph.D. in linguistics (1969) under Roger Shuy, both from Hartford Seminary Foundation.

He has been on the faculty at Georgetown University and the University of the District of Columbia, was the Director of Research at the Center for Applied Linguistics from 1980 to 1992, and in 1992 he was named the first William C. Friday Distinguished University Professor of English Linguistics at North Carolina State University. Wolfram is a former president of the Linguistic Society of America as well as of the American Dialect Society.

== Linguistics and the public ==
=== Linguistic gratuity ===
In 1993, Wolfram formulated the principle of linguistic gratuity, which states that "investigators who have obtained linguistic data from members of a speech community should actively pursue ways in which they can return linguistic favors to the community". In 2008, he and co-authors outlined venues for engaging in linguistic gratuity, including "video documentaries, oral history CDs, museum exhibits, formal curricular programs, and popular trade books on language differences," venues through which Wolfram himself has engaged in collaborative engagement via the Language and Life Project.

=== Language and Life Project ===
Wolfram directs the Language and Life Project, a nonprofit at North Carolina State University dedicated to documenting and celebrating language diversity through public means. He established the Language and Life Project in 1993. Through the Language and Life Project, Wolfram has been involved in the production of television and film documentaries about dialect diversity (often in collaboration with Neal Hutcheson), as well as the construction of museum exhibits, the publication of popular books, and the development of dialect awareness curricula for schools and the general public.

=== Documentaries ===
Wolfram was executive producer for the Language and Life Project documentary film First Language: The Race to Save Cherokee (2014), produced and directed by Danica Cullinan and Neal Hutcheson. The documentary chronicles the history of the Cherokee language in North Carolina and the efforts of the Eastern Band of Cherokee to save and preserve their endangered language. The film was awarded Best Public Service Film at the 2014 American Indian Film Festival. In 2015, PBS selected the documentary for national distribution, making it available for broadcast at member stations in 2016. In 2016, film won a regional Emmy in the documentary/cultural category at the 30th Midsouth Emmy Awards.

Also in conjunction with the Language and Life Project, Wolfram was executive producer for the documentary films Talking Black in America: The Story of African American Language (2019) and Signing Black in America: The Story of Black ASL (2020), both produced and directed by Danica Cullinan and Neal Hutcheson; as well as the Talking Black in American Project, a five-part documentary television series. Talking Black in America (2019) chronicles the history and impact of African American English. In 2020, the film won a Midsouth Regional Emmy award in the documentary/cultural category. Signing Black in America (2020) is the first documentary about Black ASL.

=== Popular books ===
Wolfram has co-authored and co-edited multiple books written for the general public, including: Hoi Toide on the Sound Soide: The Story of the Ocracoke Brogue (1997 UNC Press), co-authored with Natalie Schilling; American Voices: How Dialects Differ from Coast to Coast (Wiley 2005), co-edited with Ben Ward; Talkin' Tar Heel: How our Voices Tell the Story of North Carolina (2014 UNC Press), co-authored with Jeffrey Reaser; and The Five-Minute Linguist: Bite-sized Essays on Language and Languages, 3rd Edition (Equinox 2019).

Talkin' Tar Heel explores regional, social, and ethnic dialects of North Carolina, drawing upon decades of research and thousands of recorded interviews with North Carolinians. The book was written for the general audience, with the goal of "shar[ing] knowledge and respect for the languages and dialects in North Carolina in a readable, audible, and visual format accessible to the public." It is first popular linguistics book to embed more than 100 video and audio clips through the use of QR codes. The book was awarded the 2014 North Caroliniana Book Award by the North Caroliniana Society.

== Awards and honors ==
In 2008, Wolfram was honored with the prestigious John Tyler Caldwell Award for the Humanities from the North Carolina Humanities Council, a statewide nonprofit affiliate of the National Endowment for the Humanities. In 2010, he was awarded the Linguistics, Language, and the Public Award by the Linguistic Society of America. In 2013, he was awarded the North Carolina Award, the highest award given to a North Carolina citizen. In 2018, he was awarded the Governor James E. Holshouser, Jr. Award for Excellence in Public Service by the UNC System. In 2019, he was inducted into the prestigious American Academy of Arts and Sciences.
