= Adolph Dial =

American politician

Adolph Lorenz Dial
- Born: December 12, 1922; Prospect, North Carolina, United States
- Died: December 24, 1995 (aged 73)
- Education: Pembroke State College (1943)
- Occupations: Historian, professor, writer
- Spouses: Ruth Jones Dial (1948-1988; deceased); Harriet Elisabeth Caligan (1990-1995; his death)

Adolph Lorenz Dial was an American historian, professor of history at the University of North Carolina at Pembroke, and a specialist in American Indian Studies. Dial was a member of the Lumbee Tribe and a graduate of Pembroke State College, where he obtained a bachelor's degree in social studies. Soon after graduating, Dial enlisted with the United States Army, completing a tour of duty in the European theater of World War II. Post-military, Dial obtained his master's degree and an advanced certificate in social studies from Boston University. Hired by Pembroke State College in 1958, Dial would go on to create the college's American Indian Studies program, the first of its kind at any university in the Southeast. In addition to his role in academia, Dial was a member of the North Carolina House of Representatives for a single term. Over the course of his career, Dial devoted the majority of his academic work towards enriching and publicizing the history of the Lumbee Tribe and its importance within the history of North Carolina, and within the greater narrative of Native American peoples. Dial died on December 24, 1995, 12 days after his 73rd birthday.

== Early life and career ==
Dial was born in Prospect, North Carolina, the son of Mary Ellen Moore and Noah Dial. He was the only son of three children, the other two being Rosa Woods and Grace Locklear. Dial grew up with his parents and siblings on the family farm and attended Indian schools throughout his childhood; ultimately, Dial stayed close to home in Robeson County when he went to university for a bachelor's degree in social studies at Pembroke State University. Soon after graduation, Dial, with only $18 in his pocket and World War II raging, enlisted with the United States Army; during his tour, Dial was involved in the invasion of Europe, which led to his aiding in the liberation of concentration camps, receiving six battle stars by the end of his period of enlistment. Upon returning from the war, Dial sought further education at the University of North Carolina at Chapel Hill, but was denied admission due to his ethnicity being labelled as 'non-white'. Despite the setback, Dial applied for admission to Boston University and graduated with a master's of education in social studies in 1953 and an advanced certification from the university in 1958.

== Tenure at UNC-Pembroke ==
Hired in 1958, Dial was a faculty member of the history department, but is most well known for his creation of the university's American Indian Studies department; first established in 1972, Dial utilized the growing national interest with the United States government and the general public to secure funding for the program. For several years, the program was the only curriculum in American Indian studies throughout the entire Southeastern United States. Dial would quickly become a nationally recognized authority on American Indian studies, as well as a leading figure for the Lumbee tribe nationally. Dial's expertise led him to eventually be appointed to serve on the American Indian Policy Review Commission, helping tribes across the country by reviewing the effects on Native Americans of federal legislation and policy. During his time at UNC-Pembroke, Dial was also able to secure a grant from the Ford Foundation; realizing the minuscule amount of information relating to the Lumbee Tribe, the foundation's grant led to Dial's collaboration with fellow UNC-P professor David Eliades in creating The Only Land I Know: A History of the Lumbee Indians. He became well known for his claim that the Lumbee were descendants of the Lost Colony and claimed he was a direct descendant of Virginia Dare. Following his first book, Dial was the author of another title pertaining to Lumbee history, this time called The Lumbee, which was published as part of a 64-volume series on Native Americans of North America. Dial retired from his professorial duties at UNC-Pembroke in 1988 after 30 years of service with the university.

== Work outside of UNC-Pembroke ==
Dial became a renowned figure in American Indian Studies not only at UNC-Pembroke, but also on the state and national stage. Dial's work became commonplace in state publications and even reached a national audience, such as his being published in U.S. News & World Report in 1984. Dial also became a spokesperson for American Indians in his political capacities; in 1972, Dial was invited to attend the 1972 Democratic National Convention, the first American Indian delegate to be extended an invitation to a national political convention of its caliber. In 1991, Dial was elected to serve as a representative in the North Carolina House of Representatives for a single term. Health issues prevented him from running for a second term to the delegation. Dial also was a businessman, forming Adolph Dial Enterprises; this undertaking led to the formation of two shopping centers, Village Center and Colony Plaza in Pembroke, North Carolina. Perhaps Dial's most successful venture came in the form of helping to start the Lumbee Bank in 1971, and serving on its first board of directors. The bank survives to this day, operating fourteen branches across three counties. Dial was also a founder of the Robeson County Church and Civic Center, and served on the board of directors for the Lumbee Regional Development Association.

== Personal life ==
During his lifetime, Dial was married twice. The first time was to Ruth Jones Dial on June 12, 1948, who remained his spouse until her death on May 6, 1988. After his first wife's death, Dial remarried to Harriet Elisabeth Calligan on December 15, 1990, in Moore County, North Carolina. Dial was a lifelong member of Prospect United Methodist Church.

== Death ==
Adolph Dial died on December 24, 1995. By the end of his life, Dial suffered complications due to heart disease, diabetes and cancer. His last years were also marked by blindness, onset from his diabetes; despite this, Dial was able to identify people by their voices and body shapes. He was 73 years of age at his time of death. He is buried next to his first wife Ruth Jones Dial in the cemetery at Prospect United Methodist Church.

== Legacy ==
As one of the first people to give an in-depth history of the Lumbee people, Dial was instrumental in helping garner public attention to the tribe and its history. His work in American Indian Studies helped pave the way for various departments and curriculum to form across the Southeastern United States. On a state level, Dial received numerous accolades including the North Carolina Folk Award and the Jefferson Award, as well as being named "Tar Heel of the Week" by the Raleigh News and Observer. Dial also received honorary doctorates from Greensboro College in 1985 and UNC-Pembroke in 1988. The Dial Humanities Building on the campus of UNC-Pembroke houses the English and Theater, History, and Foreign Language departments of the university. The Adolph L. Dial Amphitheater on the university's campus is a dedication towards his philanthropic work, and regularly performed the play Strike at the Wind! for the community until 2007. In 2021, Dr. Adolph L. Dial Endowed Professorship of American Indian Studies was named at UNC-Pembroke in his honor.
