= Dialect awareness =

Dialect awareness is an instructional approach that teaches basic sociolinguistic concepts to students with the purpose of increasing awareness of language variation and improving language attitudes. An example of this approach is the Voices of North Carolina (VoNC) curriculum developed by Jeffrey Reaser and Walt Wolfram. The VoNC curriculum consists of a video and week-long social studies unit for 8th graders in North Carolina. A pilot study found improved language attitudes among participants.

Dialect awareness teaching is composed of three general components:

1. Building respect for different languages and language varieties
2. Understanding basic sociolinguistic concepts
3. Practice style-shifting from one language variety to another (typically from informal language to formal language)

Dialect awareness instruction may use the contrastive analysis method to compare and contrast language features.

Dialect awareness instruction has been shown to increase instances of Standard English in academic writing.

The dialect awareness approach has been criticized for lack of attention to language and power issues; some researchers advocate for a critical language pedagogy that explicitly deals with issues of linguistic prejudice, use of vernacular language varieties in education, and linguistic identity.
