= Philadelphus Presbyterian Church =

Historic church in North Carolina, United States

- U.S. National Register of Historic Places
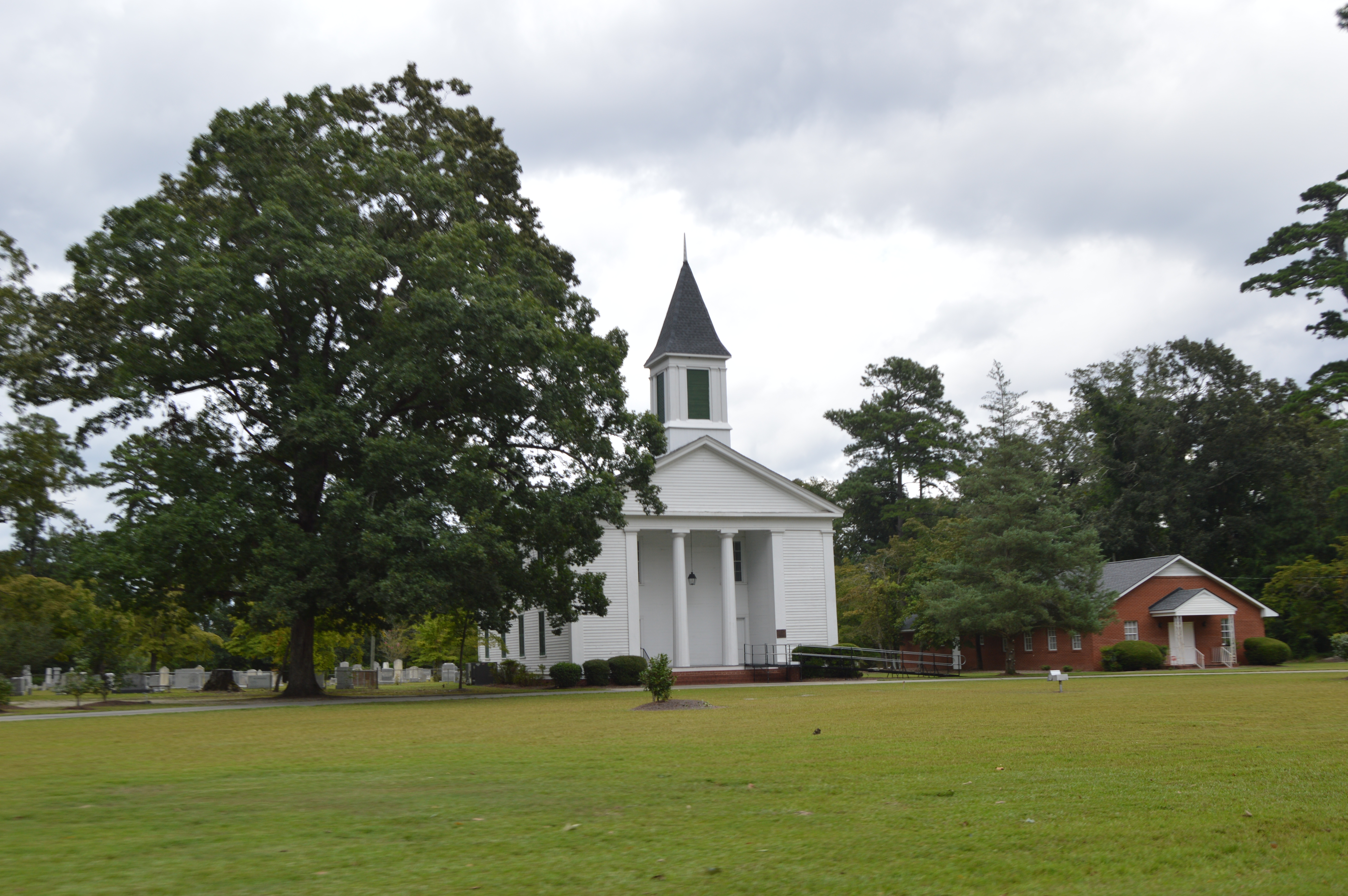
- Distant view from the road

- Location within North Carolina Location within the United States
- Location: SR 1318 SW of jct. with NC 72, Philadelphus, North Carolina
- Coordinates: 34°45′52″N 79°10′46″W
- Area: 7 acres (2.8 ha)
- Built: 1858
- Architect: Gilbert P. Higley
- Architectural style: Greek Revival
- NRHP reference No.: 75001287
- Added to NRHP: October 3, 1975

Philadelphus Presbyterian Church, is a historic Presbyterian church located near Philadelphus, Robeson County, North Carolina. It was built during the Antebellum era, in 1858, by carpenter Gilbert P. Higley. This church replaced an earlier one which had been in existence since at least 1795. The new church by Higley was constructed in the Greek Revival style with an in antis portico (columns on either side of the entranceway) and was able to accommodate a two-story sanctuary and gallery.

The property was listed on the National Register of Historic Places in 1975.
