= Locklear =

Locklear is a surname. It is documented to be of free African-American origin.

Notable people with the surname include:

- Arlinda Locklear (born 1951), American lawyer
- Ashton Locklear (born 1998), American gymnast
- Gene Locklear, (born 1949), American baseball player
- Heather Locklear (born 1961), American actress
- Horace Locklear (1942–2024), American politician and former attorney
- Ormer Locklear (1891–1920), American stunt pilot and film actor
- Samuel J. Locklear (born 1954), American navy admiral
- Tyler Locklear (born 2000), American baseball player
