= Hamilton McMillan =

Hamilton McMillan (August 29, 1837 – February 27, 1916) was an American politician who served in the North Carolina General Assembly from 1885 to 1887. He supported the founding of the Croatan Normal School for the Lumbee people. The school later became University of North Carolina at Pembroke.

== Biography ==
Hamilton McMilan was born on August 29, 1837, in Roslin, North Carolina, to William and Ann Peterson McNeill McMillan. He enlisted during the American Civil War on April 17, 1861 and left service in 1865. He represented Robeson County in the North Carolina General Assembly from 1885 to 1887. During his tenure he supported the founding of the Croatan Normal School for the Lumbee people. The school later became University of North Carolina at Pembroke. He was also convinced the Lumbee were descendents of the Lost Colony of Roanoke. He died on February 27, 1916. A bronze statue of him was dedicated on campus on March 5, 1987, and rededicated on March 28, 2019.
