= Jimmy Goins =

American politician (1948–2015)

Chairman of the Lumbee Tribe of North Carolina
- In office 2004–2010
- Succeeded by: Paul Brooks

Personal details
- Born: August 31, 1948
- Died: June 7, 2015 (aged 66) Maxton, North Carolina, US
- Spouse: Diane Goins
- Children: 3 daughters

James Ernest Goins (August 31, 1948 – June 7, 2015) was a Lumbee politician who served as the chairman of the Lumbee Tribe of North Carolina from 2004 to 2010. As Tribal Chairman, Goins led efforts to gain federal recognition for the Lumbee Tribe during the 2000s. During Goins' tenure, the tribe held state recognition in North Carolina, but had not yet received federal recognition. On December 18, 2025, a decade after Goins death, the Lumbee Tribe obtained federal recognition with the passing of the Lumbee Fairness Act within the 2026 National Defense Authorization Act.

== Early life ==
Goins was born on August 31, 1948, to Ernest and Ola Lee Goins. He was raised in Prospect, North Carolina. In 1965, Goins was a member of the Prospect High School basketball team which won the Indian Basketball Championship. Goins later served as an infantry squad leader with the 504th Infantry Regiment of the 82nd Airborne Division during the Vietnam War.

== Political career ==
Jimmy Goins served as the Chairman of the Lumbee Tribe for six years from 2004 until 2010. As Chairman, Goins led efforts to achieve federal recognition for the Lumbee during the 2000s. He testified before the United States Senate Committee on Indian Affairs in September 2007 in an effort to gain recognition. In 2010, Goins signed a controversial lobbying contract with a Nevada-based gaming consultant.

Goins ran for Chairman again in 2012, but lost the election his successor, incumbent Lumbee Chairman Paul Brooks, on November 12, 2012. Brooks received 2,559 votes, or 52% of the vote, while Goins placed second with 2,042 votes (42%). A third candidate, Lynn Bruce Jacobs, received 298 votes (6%).

== Personal life ==
Goins was a resident of Philadelphus, North Carolina. He and his wife, Diane Goins, had three daughters, Rhonda, Jackie and Jamie.

== Death ==
Jimmy Goins was killed in a car accident at 1:30 p.m. on June 7, 2015, at the age of 66. Goins was driving on North Carolina Highway 71, approximately 4.4 miles from the town of Maxton, North Carolina, when the accident occurred. North Carolina Governor Pat McCrory and North Carolina First Lady Ann McCrory released a joint statement of condolence following Goins' death. McCrory ordered that all state flags be lowered to half staff in Goins' memory on June 11, 2015.

== Legacy ==
In 2017, the North Carolina Department of Transportation honored Goins with a highway marker between Maxton and Red Springs. Goins was recognized for his public service and legacy. The resolution was presented on June 28, 2017, at the department’s board room, where his wife, family members, friends, and tribal leaders were in attendance. The effort was led by Spencer and Marshirl Locklear and state Senator Danny Britt. Grady Hunt, the first Lumbee member of the North Carolina Board of Transportation, also attended the ceremony.
