= Brayboy =

Brayboy is a surname. Notable people with the surname include:

- Chandler Brayboy (born 2001), American football player
- Jack S. Brayboy (1921–1976), African-American football player and scholar
