= American Indian Policy Review Commission =

American Congressional commission

The American Indian Policy Review Commission was a commission established in 1975 with Public Law 93-580 during the 93rd Congress. The commission was established in order to conduct a comprehensive review of the relationship between the USA federal government and Native Americans. The commission consisted of six members of Congress and five Native American representatives. The commission was assigned to conduct investigation on the state of affairs of federally recognized and unrecognized tribes so a report, similar to the Meriam Report, and a series of recommendations could be submitted to Congress by 1977.

== Formation ==
In 1972, the Bureau of Indian Affairs building was seized by Native Americans. In 1973, the town of Wounded Knee was occupied by Native Americans. In light of this unrest, Senator James G. Abourezk of South Dakota attributed the issue to inconsistency in Native American policy due to laws being passed without regard for previous laws. Different administrations had taken different approaches to Native Americans over centuries which led to a series of inconsistent Native American policy. To fix the inconsistency in Native American policy, Senator James G. Abourezk proposed the Senate Joint Solution 133 which would establish an American Indian Policy Review Commission to review these laws. The commission was given a budget of 2.5 million USD to investigate the Native American-Federal government relationship so that policies and programs could be made more beneficial and comprehensive to Native Americans.

== Task forces ==
The American Indian Policy Review Commission established eleven task forces, each consisting of three members. The task forces were assigned to investigate:

- Trust responsibility and Federal-Indian relationship
- Tribal government
- Federal administration and structure of Indian affairs
- Federal, state, and tribal jurisdiction
- Indian education
- Indian health
- Reservation and resource development and protection
- Urban and rural non-reservation Indians
- Indian law revision, consolidation, and codification
- Terminated and non-federally recognized tribes
- Alcohol and drug abuse

Of the 33 task force members, 31 members were of Native American descent while two were non-native Americans. By design, a majority of the task force members were of Native American descent.

== Result ==
The American Indian Policy Review Commission ultimately published a report as a set of volumes in 1976 and 1977. The American Indian Policy Review Commission sought to expand Native American social services. However, the resulting report did not provide the extensive legal and historical analysis that was expected and was quickly passed from view.
