= Arlinda Locklear =

American lawyer

Arlinda Locklear (born 1951) is an American lawyer of Native American origin from the Lumbee tribe. Locklear, who is often cited as the first Native American woman to argue a case before the U.S. Supreme Court, has actually followed in the footsteps of Lyda Conley (ca. 1869 – 1946), who was the first Native American and Native American woman admitted to argue a case before the US Supreme Court. Locklear is noted as an expert in Native American law and tribal recognition litigation. She represented the Lumbee tribe in its quest for federal recognition from 1987 until 2010.

== Early life ==
Locklear was born in 1951 to Edsel Locklear and Mary Elizabeth Revels, both members of the Lumbee. Locklear was born in Fort Bragg, and she spent most of her youth in Charleston, where her father worked with the navy. Every summer and during holidays, however, Locklear went to Robeson County, North Carolina, where her grandparents and other Lumbee tribe members lived. Despite her love of Robeson County, Locklear had regular experiences with segregation as a child. Those early experiences with discrimination – such as being made to sit in the "Indian" section of local movie theatres – compelled her to become a lawyer to help protect her people from acts of racism.

Locklear earned a BA in political science from the College of Charleston in 1973, followed by a JD from the School of Law at Duke University in 1976. During her time at Duke University, Locklear won a moot court competition in her third year, beating a young John Kerry. Her interest in Native American law was deepened further after taking a course taught by anthropologist and lawyer Lawrence Rosen.

== Career ==
Upon graduation in 1976, Locklear began working as a staff attorney at the Boulder, Colorado, branch of the Native American Rights Fund (NARF). In 1982, she became the directing attorney of NARF's Washington office.

In 1983, Locklear became the first Native American woman to argue a case before the United States Supreme Court. In the case of Solem v. Barlett, Locklear successfully defended the right of the Sioux people to try their own residents for crimes committed on reservation territory. Two years later, Locklear successfully argued the case of Oneida Indian Nation v. County of Oneida, leading the Supreme Court to decide that the State of New York had wrongfully taken possession of lands belonging to the Oneida tribe.

Among her other legal victories, Locklear recounts one of her proudest moments as stemming from a case for the Fort McDowell Yavapai Nation in Arizona, filed during the late 1970s. The reservation was dry and arid at the time, with the reservation suffering from lack of water due to legal issues with water rights. Locklear and the Fort McDowell Yavapai Nation won their case in 1990, and the land around the reservation has since been "in bloom and cultivated".

In the late 1980s, Locklear became involved in the Lumbee tribe's battle for federal recognition. In 1885, the tribe had been legally acknowledged by the state of North Carolina, but not the United States government. Despite receiving a federal acknowledgement in 1956, the Lumbee received none of the benefits or entitlements given to other Native American tribes. In 1987, Locklear became the tribe's official legal representative pro bono. She testified before Congress multiple times. In 1995, she came close to victory when the House of Representatives passed a bill for the formal recognition of the Lumbee, but the bill was ultimately stalled by the Senate. Locklear continued legally representing her tribe until March 2010, when she was replaced as lobbyist for the Lumbee by gaming company Lewin International, which had recently signed a business contract with the tribe. She has since renewed her role with the tribe.

After 1988, Locklear worked for the law firm Patton Boggs, LLC, in Washington D.C., while also establishing her own private practice.

== Honors ==
In 1987, Locklear was named the Outstanding Woman of Color by the National Institute for Women of Color, and in 1995 she received North Carolina Equity's Carpathian Award for Speaking Out.

Locklear has received honorary doctorates from the State University of New York at Oneonta (1990), North Carolina State University (2007), the College of Charleston (2012), and the University of North Carolina at Pembroke (2013). Upon receiving her doctorate from Charleston, Locklear gave the commencement speech to graduating students.

She is recipient of the Julian T. Pierce award, in recognition of her work as an advocate of equal justice. In 2012, Locklear received the Margaret Brent Women Lawyers of Achievement Award from the American Bar Association. The Association commented on her expertise in Native American law and the federal recognition of Indian tribes, and called her "an inspiration" to other Native American women lawyers.

From June 2016 to December 2017, Locklear was among 12 contemporary Native American women leaders who had their stories featured in an exhibition at the Mitchell Museum of the American Indian.

== Personal life ==
Locklear has two children, a son and a daughter. Her husband was also an attorney for Native American rights; he died of a heart attack in 1988.

== See also ==
- List of first women lawyers and judges in the United States
