= Lawrence (given name) =

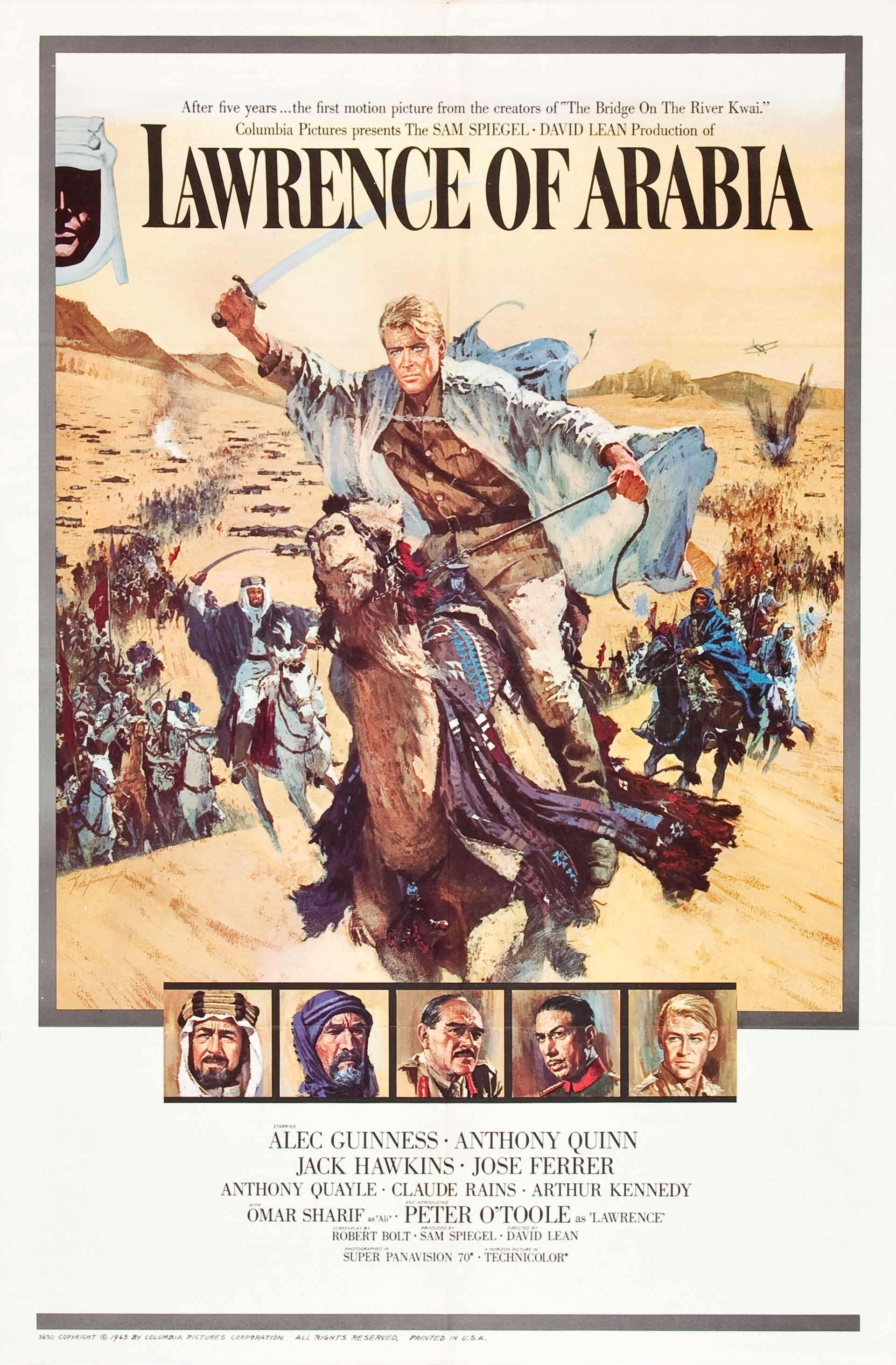
- The theatrical release poster for Lawrence of Arabia
- Pronunciation: /ˈlɒ.rəns/ LOR-ense
- Gender: Male

Origin
- Origin: Latin
- Meaning: "from Laurentum"

Other names
- Nicknames: Larry, Lawrie
- Derived: Laurentius
- Related names: Laurence, Clarence, Labhrás, Larence, Larford, Lars, Laurencjusz, Laurenty, Wawrzyniec, Laurens, Laurent, Laurențiu, Laurentius, Lavrentis, Lavrenti, Lavrentiy, Lavrenty, Llorente\Lorente, Lorens, Lorentz, Lorenz, Lorenzo, Lőrinc (Hungarian), Lourenço, Vavrinec/Vavřinec, Lovre/Lovro.

Lawrence is a masculine given name. It is an Anglicisation of the French Laurent, which is in turn derived from the Latin Laurentius or Old Greek Lavrenti (which in modern Greek became Lavrentis). Pet forms of Lawrence include Larry, Lawrie and, less commonly, Law.

== People ==
=== A ===
- Lawrence Rosario Abavana (1920–2004), Ghanaian politician and teacher
- Lawrence G. Abele (born 1946), American academic
- Lawrence D. Ackman (1939–2022), American real estate entrepreneur
- Lawrence Adegbeingbe (born 1957), Nigerian sprinter
- Lawrence Adjei (born 1979), Ghanaian footballer
- Lawrence Aidoo (born 1982), Ghanaian footballer
- Lawrence Alexander (basketball) (born 1991), American basketball player
- Lawrence H. Aller (1913–2003), American astronomer
- Lawrence Alma-Tadema (1836–1912), Dutch-born British painter
- Lawrence K. Altman (born 1937), American physician and journalist for The New York Times
- Lawrence Anastasia (1926–2008), American politician
- Lawrence Andreasen (1945–1990), American diver
- Lawrence Anini (c. 1960–1987), Nigerian bandit
- Lawrence A. Appley (1904-1997), American management specialist and organizational theorist
- Lawrence Archer (1820–1910), American politician, judge
- Lawrence Ardren, 16th-century English politician
- Lawrence Ashcroft (1954–1962), Archdeacon of Stow
- Lawrence Ati-Zigi (born 1996), Ghanaian footballer
- Lawrence Auster (1949–2013), American essayist
- Lawrence Austin (born 1955), Australian boxer
- Lawrence de Awkeburne, 13th-century Bishop of Salisbury-elect

=== B ===
- Lawrence J. Baack (born 1943), American historian
- Lawrence Sprague Babbitt (1839–1903), United States Army officer
- Lawrence Babits (born 1943), American archaeologist
- Lawrence Bachmann (1911–2004), American film producer and executive
- Lawrence Bacow (born 1951), Retired President of Harvard University
- Lawrence Joseph Bader (1926–1966), American salesman and host
- Lawrence Baker (tennis) (1890–1980), American tennis administrator and player
- Lawrence Banks (1880–1935), American football player and coach
- Lawrence Barcella (1945–2010), American lawyer
- Lawrence J. Barkwell (1943-2019), Canadian historian
- Lawrence Barrett (1838–1891), American stage actor
- Lawrence Baskir (born 1938), American judge
- Lawrence Bathurst (1871–1939), English cricketer
- Lawrence Batley (1911–2002), British entrepreneur
- Lawrence James Beck (1938–1994), American sculptor
- Lawrence C. Becker (1939–2018), American philosopher
- Lawrence Beesley (1877–1967), English teacher and RMS Titanic survivor
- Lawrence Bell (footballer) (1872–1945), Scottish footballer
- Lawrence Dale Bell (1894–1956), American industrialist
- Lawrence Bierton (born 1960), British murderer
- Lawrence Bishnoi (born 1993), Indian gang member
- Lawrence Blackledge (born 1985), American basketball player
- Lawrence Blackwell (died 1987), American politician
- Lawrence Rogers Blinks (1900–1989), American botanist
- Lawrence Blochman (1900–1975), American crime writer
- Lawrence Block (born 1938), American writer of crime fiction
- Lawrence J. Block (1951–2025), American judge
- Lawrence D. Bobo (born 1958), American professor
- Lawrence Bogorad (1921–2003), American botanist
- Lawrence C. Boles (1883–1945), American football player and coach
- Lawrence Booth, Archbishop of York from 1476 to 1480
- Lawrence Bossidy (1935–2025), American businessman and author
- Lawrence A. Bowes (1885–1955), American actor
- Lawrence Bragg (1890–1971), Australian and British X-ray crystallographer
- Lawrence Brainerd (1794–1870), American businessman, abolitionist and politician
- Lawrence Ytzhak Braithwaite (1963–2008), Canadian writer
- Lawrence O'Bryan Branch (1820–1862), American politician
- Lawrence Eugene Brandt (1939–2025), American Roman Catholic prelate
- Lawrence Briggs (1903–1970), American soccer coach
- Lawrence Bright (1847-1908), Architect from England
- Lawrence Hamner Brinker (born 1950), American politician
- Lawrence Brittain (born 1990), South African rower
- Lawrence Brock (1906–1968), American politician
- Lawrence Brooks (American veteran) (1909–2022), American World War II veteran
- Lawrence Brooks (1912–1994), American actor
- Lawrence Brown (jazz trombonist) (1907–1988), American jazz trombonist
- Lawrence Bulger (1870–1928), Irish rugby union player
- Lawrence Burd (1863–1931), British schoolmaster and philatelist
- Lawrence Butler (basketball) (1957–2018), American basketball player
- Lawrence Butler (baseball) (born 2000), American baseball player
- Lawrence E. Butler (born 1953), American diplomat
- Lawrence W. Butler (1908–1988), American special effects artist
- Lawrence Byford (1925–2018), English police officer

=== C ===
- Lawrence Cager (born 1997), American football player
- Lawrence Calcagno (1913–1993), American painter
- Lawrence Campe (died 1613), Merchant
- Lawrence Cannon (born 1947), Canadian politician
- Lawrence Carroll (1954–2019), Australian-born American painter
- Lawrence Carter (1641–1710), English lawyer and politician
- Lawrence Cartwright (born 1948), Bahamian politician
- Lawrence B. Casey (1905–1977), American prelate
- Lawrence Casserley (born 1941), English composer
- Lawrence Chambers (born 1929), American naval officer
- Lawrence Chaney (born 1996), Scottish drag performer
- Lawrence Chelin (1958–2020), South African footballer
- Lawrence Cheng (born 1954), Hong Kong actor and filmmaker
- Lawrence Chongson (1963 – 2021), Filipino basketball coach
- Lawrence Chubb (1873–1948), Anglo-Australian environmental campaigner
- Lawrence Chungu (born 1991), Zambian footballer
- Lawrence Clarke (hurdler) (born 1990), British hurdler
- Lawrence Clayton (1891–1949), American banker and corporate executive
- Lawrence Cobb (1894–1945), American politician
- Lawrence Cohn (1932–2023), American music executive
- Lawrence H. Cohn (1937–2016), American surgeon and academic
- Lawrence Colburn (1949–2016), US Army soldier
- Lawrence Collins, Baron Collins of Mapesbury (born 1941), British former judge
- Lawrence A. Conner Sr. (1899–1964), American politician
- Lawrence Conrad (born 1949), British Orientalist and historian of medicine
- Lawrence Cook (actor) (1930–2003), American actor
- Lawrence H. Cooke (1914–2000), American lawyer and politician
- Lawrence Owen Cooper Sr. (1908–1986), American businessman and humanitarian
- Lawrence E. Corbett Jr. (1921–2020), American politician
- Lawrence W. Corbett (1859–1897), American politician
- Lawrence Moore Cosgrave (1890–1971), Canadian diplomat
- Lawrence Costa (1969/1970–2022), Australian politician
- Lawrence Cotton (born 1927), American musician
- Lawrence Cowan (1858–1933), American politician
- Lawrence William Cramer (1897–1978), American politician
- Lawrence Crawford (mathematician) (1867-1951), Scottish mathematician
- Lawrence (bishop of Csanád) (died after 1113), Hungarian clergyman
- Lawrence Crossley (1899–1962), American developer
- Lawrence Cunliffe (1929–2025), British politician
- Lawrence S. Cunningham (1935–2025), American theologian
- Lawrence Curry (1935–2018), American politician

=== D ===
- Lawrence D'Orsay (1853–1931), British actor
- Lawrence Taliaferro Dade (1785–1842), American politician
- Lawrence F. Dahl (1929–2021), American chemist
- Lawrence Joseph Sarsfield Daly (1912–1978), American politician
- Lawrence Dane (1937–2022), Canadian actor and director
- Lawrence Darvall (1898–1968), Royal Air Force Air Marshal
- Lawrence Daws (1927–2025), Australian painter and printmaker
- Lawrence Dawsey (born 1967), American football player and coach
- Lawrence Day (born 1949), Canadian chess player
- Lawrence J. DeLucas (born 1950), American astronaut and biochemist
- Lawrence J. DeNardis (1938–2018), American politician
- Lawrence Dentico (born 1923), American mobster
- Lawrence Dermer (born 1962), American songwriter
- Lawrence Russell Dewey (1901–1994), United States Army general
- Lawrence Dickson (1920–1944), Tuskegee Airman
- Lawrence Dobkin (1919–2002), American actor, director and screenwriter
- Lawrence Igyuse Doki (1923–1981), Nigerian army officer
- Lawrence Donovan (1885–1948), American writer
- Lawrence Duffy (born 1951), Irish Roman Catholic prelate
- Lawrence Duhé (1887–1960), American jazz musician
- Lawrence Dupont (1891–1955), American football player
- Lawrence Durrell (1912–1990), British novelist, poet, dramatist, and travel writer
- Lawrence Samuel Durrell (1884–1928), British Indian subject and engineer

=== E ===
- Lawrence Eagleburger (1930–2011), American statesman and diplomat
- Lawrence R. Ellzey (1891–1977), American politician
- Lawrence Ely (1911–1983), American football player
- Lawrence Ennali (born 2002), German footballer
- Lawrence Ennis (1871–1938), Scottish engineer
- Lawrence Everhart (1755–1840), American soldier
- Lawrence Ewhrudjakpo (1965–2025), Nigerian politician

=== F ===
- Lawrence Fanous (born 1985), Jordanian triathlete
- Lawrence Farley (1856–1910), American baseball player
- Lawrence F. Feloney (1921–2004), Massachusetts politician
- Lawrence Ferlinghetti (1919–2021), American poet
- Lawrence Fertig (1898–1986), Advertising executive, economist
- Lawrence Filippone (born 1954), American educator
- Lawrence Flick (1856-1938), American physician
- Lawrence Flugence (born 1980), American football player
- Lawrence Fortun (born 1971), Filipino lawyer and politician
- Lawrence Frank (born 1970), American basketball coach and executive
- Lawrence Frostad (born 1967), American swimmer
- Lawrence Fuchs (1927–2013), American scholar
- Lawrence T. Fuglaar (1895–1972), American politician
- Lawrence Funderburke (born 1970), American basketball player
- Lawrence Furniss (1862–1941), English footballer

=== G ===
- Lawrence Gaines (born 1953), American football player
- Lawrence Gama (1935–2009), Tanzanian politician
- Lawrence Paul Garrod (1895–1979), bacteriologist, Garrod, Lawrence Paul
- Lawrence M. Gelb (1898–1980), American chemist and businessman
- Lawrence Van Gelder (1933–2016), American journalist
- Lawrence Gilman (1878–1939), American music critic
- Lawrence Gobright (1816–1879), American journalist
- Lawrence Gonzi (born 1953), Maltese politician
- Lawrence Seymour Goodman (1920–2021), British airman and bomber pilot
- Lawrence Goodwyn (1928–2013), American writer and political theorist
- Lawrence Gordon (gridiron football) (born 1984), American gridiron football player
- Lawrence Gostin (born 1949), American law professor
- Lawrence Gowing (1918–1991), English artist
- Lawrence De Graff (1871–1934), American judge
- Lawrence Otis Graham (1961–2021), American lawyer and writer
- Lawrence Grant (1870–1952), English actor
- Lawrence Gray (1898–1970), American actor
- Lawrence G. Greenwood (1921–2006), Canadian banker
- Lawrence Grossberg (born 1947), American academic
- Lawrence Grossmith (1877–1944), English actor
- Lawrence N. Guarino (1922–2014), US Air Force officer
- Lawrence Gubow (1919–1978), American judge
- Lawrence Gushee (1931–2015), American musicologist
- Lawrence Guy (born 1990), American football player
- Lawrence Guyot (1939–2012), American activist

=== H ===
- Lawrence B. Hagel (born 1947), American judge
- Lawrence W. Hager (1890–1982), American newspaper publisher
- Lawrence Palk, 1st Baron Haldon (1818–1883), British politician
- Lawrence Halsted (1764–1841), Royal Navy Admiral
- Lawrence Alexander Hardie (1933–2013), American geologist
- Lawrence Hare (born 1969), English speedway rider
- Lawrence Hargrave (1850–1915), Australian engineer and inventor
- Lawrence Harland (1905–1977), Archdeacon of Rochester 1951–1969
- Lawrence Hart (American football) (born 1976), American football player
- Lawrence Hauben (1931–1985), American screenwriter
- Lawrence Haworth (1926–2024), American-born Canadian philosopher
- Lawrence R. Heaney (born 1952), American zoologist
- Lawrence Ray Heckard (1923–1991), American botanist
- Lawrence Hertzog (1951–2008), American television writer and producer
- Lawrence Heyworth Jr. (1921–2003), United States Navy admiral
- Lawrence Heyworth (1786–1872), English merchant
- Lawrence Hill (born 1957), Canadian novelist, essayist, and memoirist
- Lawrence D. Hills (1911–1990), British organic horticulturalist
- Lawrence Hogan (1928–2017), American politician from Maryland
- Lawrence Holofcener (1926–2017), American-British sculptor, lyricist, playwright
- Lawrence Horn (1940–2017), American musician, record producer, and recording engineer
- Lawrence "Teddy Boy" Houle (1938–2020), Métis fiddler
- Lawrence Van Huizen (1930–2019), Malaysian field hockey player
- Lawrence Humphrey (died 1589), English theologian
- Lawrence Hunter (born 1961), American computational biologist
- Lawrence Huntington (1900–1968), British film director, screenwriter, producer
- Lawrence Hyde (died 1590), English politician

=== I ===
- Lawrence Inglee (born 1973), American film producer

=== J ===
- Lawrence Jackson (born 1985), American football player
- Lawrence Jackson (rower) (1907–1937), New Zealand rower
- Lawrence Jackson (guard) (born 1964), American football player
- Lawrence Colvile Jackson (1851–1905), British barrister and colonial judge
- Lawrence Jacobs (lawyer) (born 1955), American lawyer
- Lawrence Jenco (1934–1996), American Catholic priest and hostage
- Lawrence Joel (1928–1984), US Army Sgt 1st Class, Medal of Honor, Silver Star, Purple Heart
- Lawrence Johnson (pole vaulter) (born 1974), American pole vaulter
- Lawrence Johnson (American football) (born 1957), American football player
- Lawrence Alexander Sidney Johnson (1925–1997), Australian botanist
- Lawrence B. Jones (born 1992), American political commentator
- Lawrence W. Jones (1925–2023), American particle physicist
- Lawrence Justinian (1381–1456), Italian Roman Catholic saint

=== K ===
- Lawrence Kaarsberg (1876–1943), American athlete and coach
- Lawrence Kadoorie, Baron Kadoorie (1899–1993), Hong Kong industrialist
- Lawrence E. Kahn (born 1937), American judge
- Lawrence Kapiloff (1929–2019), American politician
- Lawrence Kasadha (born 1994), Ugandan footballer
- Lawrence Kasanoff (born 1959), American film producer
- Lawrence Kasdan (born 1949), American filmmaker
- Lawrence Katilungu (1914–1961), Zambian trade unionist
- Lawrence Kavenagh (c. 1810 – 1846), Irish-born Australian criminal
- Lawrence Kearny (1789-1868), American politician
- Lawrence H. Keeley (1948–2017), American archaeologist
- Lawrence Kenny (1896–1977), American priest
- Lawrence Kestenbaum (born 1955), American lawyer
- Lawrence Keyte (born 1963), Canadian modern pentathlete
- Lawrence Kimball (1900–1971), British politician
- Lawrence E. King Jr. (born 1944), American banker and politician
- Lawrence Klecatsky (1941–2018), American rower
- Lawrence Klein (1920–2013), American economist
- Lawrence H. Knox (1906–1966), American chemist
- Lawrence Kohlberg (1927–1987), American psychologist
- Lawrence L. Koontz Jr. (1940–2025), American judge
- Lawrence Korb (1939–2026), American foreign policy analyst
- Lawrence Kornfeld (born 1930), American theater director
- Lawrence Kramer (musicologist) (born 1946), American musicologist and composer
- Lawrence Francis Kramer (1933–2023), American politician
- Lawrence B. Krause (born 1929), American economist
- Lawrence Krauss (born 1954), American particle physicist and cosmologist
- Lawrence Kubie (1896–1973), American psychiatrist
- Lawrence Kun (1884–1942), Soviet politician
- Lawrence Kushner (born 1943), American rabbi and writer

=== L ===
- Lawrence L. Lamade (born 1947), United States lawyer
- Lawrence Lambe (1863-1919), Canadian geologist and paleontologist
- Lawrence Langer (1929–2024), American scholar and Holocaust analyst
- Lawrence Marvin Langer (1913–2000), American nuclear physicist
- Lawrence Langner (1890–1962), American dramatist
- Lawrence Lartey (born 1994), Ghanaian footballer
- Lawrence Lasker (born 1949), American screenwriter and producer
- Lawrence Lau (barrister) (born 1968), Hong Kong barrister
- Lawrence O. Lawson (1842–1912), Swedish-American lifesaving station keeper
- Lawrence Leathers (1981–2019), American drummer
- Lawrence Lebduska ((1894–1966), American artist
- Lawrence Lee (1909–2011), British stained glass artist
- Lawrence Lek (born 1982), Multimedia artist
- Lawrence Lemieux (born 1955), Canadian sailor
- Lawrence LeShan (1920–2020), American psychologist
- Lawrence Lessig (born 1961), American legal scholar and activist
- Lawrence Michael Levine (born 1976), American actor, writer, and filmmaker
- Lawrence Lewis (1767–1839), Virginia planter
- Lawrence Lewis Jr. (1918–1995), American businessman and philanthropist
- Lawrence Lidsky (1935–2002), American physicist
- Lawrence Joseph Lincoln (1909–2000), United States Army general
- Lawrence Lindemer (1921–2020), American politician
- Lawrence Lindsey (born 1954), American economist and government official
- Lawrence Lipton (1898–1975), American journalist
- Lawrence Lovasik (1913–1986), Priest and author
- Lawrence Lozzano (born 1970), American soccer player
- Lawrence E. Lucas (1933–2020), American Catholic priest
- Lawrence MacAulay (born 1946), Canadian politician
- Lawrence Macdonald (1799–1878), Scottish sculptor

=== M ===
- Lawrence Mangano
- Lawrence Marcus (1917–2013), American businessman
- Lawrence S. Margolis (1935–2017), American judge
- Lawrence Markley (1884–1920), American college football player
- Lawrence Marrero (1900–1959), American jazz banjoist
- Lawrence Martin-Bittman (1931–2018), Czech-born author and defector
- Lawrence Maxwell (cricketer) (born 1941), Barbadian cricketer
- Lawrence Mbwega (1912 - 2010), Ugandan Roman Catholic priest
- Lawrence McAdory (born 1929), American politician
- Lawrence McCormick (1888–1961), Ice hockey player
- Lawrence McCutcheon (1950–2026), American football player and executive
- Lawrence M. McKenna (1933–2023), American judge
- Lawrence James McNamara (1928–2004), Catholic bishop
- Lawrence McPhee (1899–1983), American football player and coach
- Lawrence Mead (born 1943), American academic
- Lawrence Mestel (born 1962), American music executive and businessman
- Lawrence Steven Meyers (1956–2023), American actor and film producer
- Lawrence Mhlanga (born 1993), Zimbabwean footballer
- Lawrence Middleton (1930–2019), British diplomat
- Lawrence Miles (cricketer) (1896–1967), South African cricketer
- Lawrence G. Miller (1936–2014), American politician
- Lawrence Millman (born 1946), American travel writer
- Lawrence Mira (born 1942), American lawyer and jurist
- Lawrence B. Mohr (1931–2025), American political scientist
- Lawrence Ah Mon (born 1949), Hong Kong film director
- Lawrence Moptyd (died 1557), English priest and academic
- Lawrence Moran (1907–1970), Australian Catholic bishop
- Lawrence Morgan (1915–1997), Australian sportsman
- Lawrence Morley (1920–2013), Canadian geophysicist
- Lawrence Moss (1927–2022), American composer
- Lawrence Moten (1972–2025), American basketball player
- Lawrence Mukasa (born 1957), Ugandan Roman Catholic prelate
- Lawrence Mukomberanwa (born 1976), Zimbabwean sculptor
- Lawrence Mulenga (born 1998), Zambian footballer
- Lawrence O. Murray (1864–1926), American politician
- Lawrence Mynott (born 1954), British illustrator, designer and portrait painter
- Lawrence Mysak (born 1940), Canadian mathematician

=== N ===
- Lawrence Nduga (born 1995), Ugandan footballer
- Lawrence R. Newman (1925–2011), American activist and writer
- Lawrence Sydney Nicasio (1956–2024), Belizean Roman Catholic bishop
- Lawrence Aaron Nixon (1883–1966), Civil rights advocate and physician
- Lawrence Norfolk (born 1963), British novelist
- Lawrence Nuesslein (1895–1971), American sport shooter

=== O ===
- Lawrence O'Donnell (born 1951), American TV host, pundit
- Lawrence Joseph O'Neill (born 1952), American judge
- Lawrence Oates (1880–1912), British explorer
- Lawrence Henry Yaw Ofosu-Appiah (1920 –1990), Ghanaian academician
- Lawrence Ogilvie (1898–1980), Scottish plant pathologist
- Lawrence Okolie (born 1992), British boxer
- Lawrence Okoye (born 1991), British discus thrower and American football player
- Lawrence Olson (1918–1992), American historian
- Lawrence Olum (born 1984), Kenyan professional footballer
- Lawrence Onochie (born 1969), Nigerian pastor
- Lawrence P. Organ (born 1959), Canadian businessman
- Lawrence Osborne (born 1958), British author
- Lawrence A. Oxley (1887–1973), American civil rights activist

=== P ===
- Lawrence M. Page (born 1944), American ichthyologist
- Lawrence Palmer (born 1938), American ice hockey player
- Lawrence Paros (1934–2019), American alternative educator
- Lawrence Pattinson (1890-1955), Royal Air Force Air Marshal
- Lawrence G. Paull (1938–2019), American neofuturistic production designer and art director
- Lawrence Payton (1938–1997), American singer-songwriter
- Lawrence Pazder (1936–2004), Canadian psychiatrist and author
- Lawrence Pendred (1899-1986), Royal Air Force Air Marshal
- Lawrence Pennell (1914-2008), Canadian lawyer, politician, and jurist
- Lawrence Pete (born 1966), American football player
- Lawrence Pheto (born 1976), Botswana Catholic prelate
- Lawrence Phillips (1975–2016), American gridiron football player
- Lawrence C. Phipps (1862–1958), American politician
- Lawrence W. Pierce (1924–2020), American judge
- Lawrence L. Piersol (born 1940), American judge
- Lawrence Pillers (born 1952), American football player
- Lawrence Poitras (1931–2022), Canadian judge
- Lawrence R. Pomeroy (1925–2020), American zoologist, ecologist, and oceanographer
- Lawrence Pondani (born 1986), Zambian footballer
- Lawrence Pope (1940–2013), American politician
- Lawrence Fung Siu Por (born 1949), Hong Kong entrepreneur
- Lawrence Power (born 1977), British violist
- Lawrence Pressman (born 1939), American actor

=== Q ===
- Lawrence Quaye (born 1984), Qatari footballer
- Lawrence F. Quigley (1893–1948), American politician
- Lawrence J. Quirk (1923–2014), American journalist

=== R ===
- Lawrence Rabiner (born 1943), American electrical engineer
- Lawrence Reade (cricketer, born 1930) (1930–2019), New Zealand cricketer
- Lawrence Reade (cricketer, born 1846) (1846–1910), New Zealand cricketer
- Lawrence Reed (born 1953), American economist
- Lawrence Fairfax Reifsnider (1887–1956), American football player and US Navy admiral
- Lawrence Renes (born 1970), Dutch-Maltese conductor
- Lawrence Rhodes (1939–2019), American dancer
- Lawrence Ricci (1945-2005), Alleged American mobster
- Lawrence Richardson Jr. (1920–2013), American classicist
- Lawrence Ricks (born 1961), American football player
- Lawrence Di Rita (born 1958), American political aide
- Lawrence Roberts (basketball) (born 1982), American basketball player
- Lawrence E. Roberts (1922–2004), Member of the Tuskegee Airmen
- Lawrence Robson (1904–1982), English accountant
- Lawrence Rocks (chemist) (born 1933), American chemist
- Lawrence Rockwood (born 1958), American activist
- Lawrence Roehm (1893–1958), American sports player and businessman
- Lawrence Rondon (1949–2018), Trinidadian footballer
- Lawrence Rosen (anthropologist) (born 1941), American anthropologist
- Lawrence G. Rossin (1952-2012), American diplomat
- Lawrence Rousseau (1809–1877), Confederate naval officer
- Lawrence Rowntree (1895–1917), British soldier
- Lawrence M. Rulison (1917–1966), American politician

=== S ===
- Lawrence Sabatini (born 1930), American priest
- Lawrence Saint-Victor (born 1982), American actor
- Lawrence Saint (1885–1961), American stained glass artist
- Lawrence B. Salkoff (born 1944), American neuroscientist
- Lawrence Thienchai Samanchit (born 1931), Thai Roman Catholic bishop
- Lawrence Sampleton (born 1959), American football player
- Lawrence Samuels (born 1970), American football player and coach
- Lawrence F. Scalise (1933–2015), American politician
- Lawrence Scarpa (born 1959), American architect and academic
- Lawrence Schiffman (born 1948), American archaeologist and Jewish historian
- Lawrence Schiller (born 1936), American producer, director, and screenwriter
- Lawrence Schkade (1930–2017), American information systems and management science researcher
- Lawrence M. Schoen (born 1959), American writer and psychologist
- Lawrence Frederik Schott (1907–1963), American bishop
- Lawrence Schulman (born 1941), American-Israeli physicist
- Lawrence Scott (born 1943), Trinidad and Tobago writer
- Lawrence Seeff (born 1959), South African cricketer
- Lawrence Segawa (born 1984), Ugandan footballer
- Lawrence Shankland (born 1995), Scottish footballer
- Lawrence Shaw (archaeologist) (born 1986), British archaeologist
- Lawrence Shehan (1898–1984), Catholic cardinal
- Lawrence Shepp (1936–2013), American mathematician
- Lawrence W. Sherman (born 1949), American criminologist and educator
- Lawrence Y. Sherman (1858–1939), American politician
- Lawrence Shields (politician) (died 1976), American politician
- Lawrence Shove (1923–1995), British sound recordist
- Lawrence Sidbury (born 1986), American football player
- Lawrence Sifuna (1946–2023), Kenyan politician
- Lawrence Simmons (1911–1994), American football and baseball coach
- Lawrence Simon (born 1977), American otolaryngologist
- Lawrence Singleton (1927–2001), American murderer
- Lawrence Sklar (1938–2024), American philosopher
- Lawrence H. Smith (1892–1958), American politician
- Lawrence J. Smith (1941–2026), American politician
- Lawrence Donald Soens (1926–2021), American bishop
- Lawrence Solan (1952–2024), American linguist
- Lawrence Sperry (1892–1923), American inventor of the autopilot
- Lawrence Springborg (born 1968), Australian politician
- Lawrence Stager (1943–2017), American archaeologist
- Lawrence W. Steinkraus (1922–1992), United States Air Force general
- Lawrence F. Stengel (born 1952), American judge
- Lawrence Vest Stephens (1858–1923), American politician
- Lawrence W. Stirling (born 1942), American politician and judge in California
- Lawrence Stone (1919–1999), English historian
- Lawrence Stroll (born 1959), Canadian businessman
- Lawrence Sutin (born 1951), American author and artist
- Lawrence Svobida (1908–1984), American farmer and author

=== T ===
- Lawrence A. Tabak (born 1951), American dentist and scientist
- Lawrence Tanfield (c. 1551–1625), English lawyer and politician
- Lawrence Taylor (born 1959), American football player
- Lawrence Eric Taylor (born 1942), American attorney and author
- Lawrence Palmer Taylor (born 1940), American diplomat
- Lawrence Terry (born 1946), American rower
- Lawrence Thomas (soccer) (born 1992), Australian soccer player
- Lawrence Thomas (American football) (born 1993), American football player
- Lawrence S. Thompson (1916–1986), American librarian
- Lawrence Tibbett (1896–1960), American opera singer
- Lawrence Tierney (1919–2002), American actor
- Lawrence Timmons (born 1986), American football player
- Lawrence Ting (1939–2004), Taiwanese businessman
- Lawrence de Tiracol (1943–2016), Indian singer and lyricist
- Lawrence Tomlinson (born 1964), English businessman
- Lawrence Treat (1903–1998), American novelist
- Lawrence Trent (born 1986), English chess player
- Lawrence Turman (1926–2023), American film producer
- Lawrence Tynes (born 1978), Scottish gridiron football player
- Lawrence Tyson (1861-1929), American officer and politician

=== U ===
- Lawrence Upton (1949–2020), British poet
- Lawrence Urquhart (1935–2025), Scottish businessman

=== V ===
- Lawrence Vambe (1917–2019), Zimbabwean writer and journalist
- Lawrence VanDyke (born 1972), American judge
- Lawrence Venuti (born 1953), American translator
- Lawrence Verney (1924-2014), British judge
- Lawrence Vickers (born 1983), American football player
- Lawrence Vigouroux (born 1993), Chilean footballer
- Lawrence J. Vilardo (born 1955), American judge
- Lawrence Virgil (born 1991), American football player
- Lawrence Visser (born 1989), Belgian football referee

=== W ===
- Lawrence Wager (1904–1965), British geologist, explorer and mountaineer
- Lawrence Walker (cricketer) (1901–1976), Irish cricketer
- Lawrence Walkup (1914–2002), American academic administrator
- Lawrence G. Wallace (1931–2020), United States deputy solicitor general
- Lawrence Walsh (1912–2014), American judge
- Lawrence Washington (1718–1752), American soldier, planter, politician, and landowner
- Lawrence Washington (1659–1698), American planter, slave holder, lawyer, soldier and politician
- Lawrence Washington (1602–1652), High Church Rector of the Church of England, great-great-grandfather of George Washington
- Lawrence Berry Washington (1811–1856), American lawyer, Forty-niner, border ruffian
- Lawrence Edward Watkin (1901–1981), American novelist
- Lawrence Watt-Evans (born 1954), American speculative fiction writer
- Lawrence Weiner (1942–2021), American artist
- Lawrence Weiskrantz (1926–2018), British psychologist
- Lawrence Weldon (1829–1905), American judge
- Lawrence Welk (1903–1992), American bandleader and TV impresario
- Lawrence West (rower) (born 1935), Canadian rower
- Lawrence Wetherby (1908–1994), American politician
- Lawrence Whalley (1946–2024), British psychiatrist
- Lawrence John de Whalley (1853–1937), British chemist
- Lawrence Grant White (1887–1956), American architect
- Lawrence H. White (born 1954), American economist
- Lawrence Williams (cricketer) (1946–2023), Welsh cricketer
- Lawrence Williams (baseball) (born 1933), American baseball player
- Lawrence P. Williams (1905–1996), British film art director
- Lawrence Wilson (born 1987), American gridiron football player
- Lawrence Winters (1915–1965), American opera singer
- Lawrence S. Wittner (born 1941), American historian
- Lawrence Wong (actor) (born 1988), Singaporean actor
- Lawrence Wong (soccer) (born 2007), Australian soccer player
- Lawrence Woods (born 1998), American gridiron football player
- Lawrence Wosskow (born 1963), British entrepreneur
- Lawrence Wright (born 1947), American writer and journalist
- Lawrence Wright (American football) (born 1973), American football player
- Lawrence Wright (Royal Navy officer)
- Lawrence C. Wroth (1884–1970), American historian

=== Y ===
- Lawrence Yearwood (1884–1942), Barbadian cricketer
- Lawrence Yule (born 1963), New Zealand politician

=== Z ===
- Lawrence Zalcman (1943–2022), American-Israeli mathematician
- Lawrence Paul Zatkoff (1939–2015), American judge
- Lawrence Zazzo (born 1970), American countertenor
- Lawrence Zimba (born 1955), Zambian politician

== Fictional characters ==
- Lawrence Alamain, from the American soap opera Days of Our Lives
- Lawrence Kutner (House), from House, M.D.
- Lawrence Gordon (character), from the horror films Saw and Saw 3D

== See also ==
- Lawrence (disambiguation)
- Lawrence (surname)
- Larry
- Laurence
- Lawrie, including a list of people with the given name, many of them named Lawrence
