= Vavrinec =

Vavrinec or Vavřinec may refer to:

== Places ==
=== Czech Republic ===
- Vavřinec (Blansko District), a municipality and village in the South Moravian Region
- Vavřinec (Kutná Hora District), a municipality and village in the Central Bohemian Region

=== Slovakia ===
- Vavrinec, Vranov nad Topľou District, a municipality and village in the Prešov Region

== People ==
=== Surname ===
- Mirka Vavrinec, Swiss tennis player
- Fan Vavřincová, Czech screenwriter and writer

=== Given name ===
- Vavrinec Benedikt of Nedožery, Slovak mathematician and writer
- Vavrinec Dunajský, Slovak sculptor
- Vavřinec Hradilek, Czech slalom canoeist
- Lawrence of Březová (Czech: Vavřinec z Březové), Czech writer
- Wenzel Lorenz Reiner (Czech: Václav Vavřinec Reiner), Bohemian painter

== See also ==
- Saint Lawrence, called Vavřinec in Czech and Vavrinec in Slovak
- St. Laurent (grape)
- Lawrence (given name)
