= Lawrence Walker (disambiguation) =

Lawrence Walker (1907–1968) was a Cajun accordionist.

Lawrence Walker may also refer to:

- Lawrence Walker (athlete) (born 1942), US race walker
- Lawrence Walker (cricketer) (1901–1976), cricketer for Ireland
- Lawrence Walker, character in Valiant Lady

== See also ==
- Larry Walker (disambiguation)
- Laurie Walker (disambiguation)
