= Larry Walker (disambiguation) =

Larry Walker (born 1966) is a Canadian baseball right fielder.

Larry Walker may also refer to:

- Larry Walker III (born 1965), state senator in the 147th Georgia General Assembly
- Larry Walker (artist) (1935–2023), American visual artist
- Larry Walker (racewalker) (born 1942), American race walker
- Larry Walker (politician) (1942–2026), American politician, member of the Georgia House of Representatives
- Larry Walker (teacher), see Meanings of minor planet names: 16001–17000

== See also ==
- Lawrence Walker (disambiguation)
- Laurie Walker (disambiguation)
