= Segawa =

Segawa (written: 瀬川 or 世川) is a Japanese surname. Notable people with the surname include:

- Akiyoshi Segawa (瀬川 昭義, born 1934), Japanese ice hockey player
- Eiko Segawa (瀬川 瑛子, born 1948), Japanese enka singer
- Kazuki Segawa (瀬川和樹, born 1990), Japanese footballer
- Maho Segawa (瀬川 真帆, born 1996), Japanese field hockey player
- Makoto Segawa (瀬川 誠, born 1974), Japanese footballer
- Ryo Segawa (瀬川 亮, born 1978), Japanese actor
- Seiki Segawa (瀬川 正義, born 1961), Japanese boxer
- Shōji Segawa (瀬川 晶司, born 1970), Japanese shogi player
- Takeru Segawa (世川 武尊, born 1991), Japanese kickboxer
- Yasuo Segawa (瀬川 康男, 1932–2010), Japanese illustrator
- Yukio Segawa (瀬川 幸雄, born 1954), Japanese boxer
- Yusuke Segawa (瀬川 祐輔, born 1994), Japanese footballer

== Fictional characters ==
- Onpu Segawa (瀬川おんぷ), a.k.a. Ellie Craft, a character from the anime series Ojamajo Doremi
  - Miho Segawa, her mother
  - Tsuyoshi Segawa, her father

== Other people ==
- Lawrence Segawa (born 1984), Ugandan footballer
- Nakisanze Segawa, Ugandan poet and writer
