= Tim Hickey =

American politician

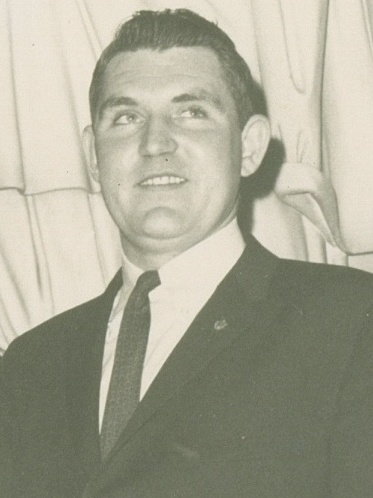

Member of the Massachusetts House of Representatives from the 3rd Middlesex district
- In office 1963–1973

Personal details
- Born: Timothy William Hickey; February 14, 1938 (age 88) Cambridge, Massachusetts
- Party: Democratic
- Spouse: Patricia Hickey
- Profession: Funeral director

Timothy William Hickey (born February 14, 1938) is an American politician. A Democrat, he served five terms (1963–1972) representing the 3rd Middlesex District in Cambridge in the Massachusetts House of Representatives. He served as Deputy State Treasurer of Massachusetts from 1972–1980.

== Early life and family ==
Hickey was born in Cambridge, Massachusetts, to William T. Hickey, a funeral director and embalmer, and Margaret (Kedian) Hickey. He was a graduate of the Cambridge Public School system. Hickey's father established the William T. Hickey Funeral Home in Cambridge in 1934. In 1959, he graduated from the New England Institute of Embalming and Funeral Directing and joined his father in a family business, the William T. Hickey & Son Funeral Home at 175 Huron Avenue in Cambridge.

In 1951, at the young age of thirteen, he met a Cambridge City Councillor by the name of Edward J. "Eddie" Sullivan. Through this friendship he became interested in a life of public service. He watched his friend go from city councillor to mayor of Cambridge and go on to become clerk of courts for Middlesex County in Massachusetts.

On June 4, 1960, Hickey married Patricia Eileen Hughes at St. Peter's Church in Cambridge.

== Political career ==
In 1962 Hickey ran for Representative from the 3rd Middlesex District. He won a competitive Democratic primary for the seat vacated by Lawrence F. Feloney, followed by a win in the November general election. He won reelection in 1964, 1966, 1968 and 1970.

Representative Hickey took his oath of office on January 1, 1963 at the age of 24, being the youngest member of the legislature. Notable members of the Class of 1963 included: Congressman Joseph D. Early of Worcester, Governor Michael S. Dukakis who became the Democratic nominee for president in 1988, David M. Bartley who became Speaker of the Massachusetts House, and Thomas W. McGee who would also go on to become Speaker.

He voted to replace four of the constitutional offices in the Commonwealth of Massachusetts, with members of the Massachusetts House of Representatives. In 1964, Robert Q. Crane as state treasurer replacing John T. Driscoll. Also in 1964, Thaddeus Buczko as state auditor replacing Thomas J. Buckley. In 1967, John F.X. Davoren replacing Kevin H. White as secretary of state. In 1969, Robert H. Quinn replacing Elliot Richardson as attorney general.

Hickey served on the following House committees: Committee on Cities, Committee on Counties, Committee on Federal Financial Assistance, and the Committee On Ways and Means. Additionally, he served on the Special Commission on Mental Health.

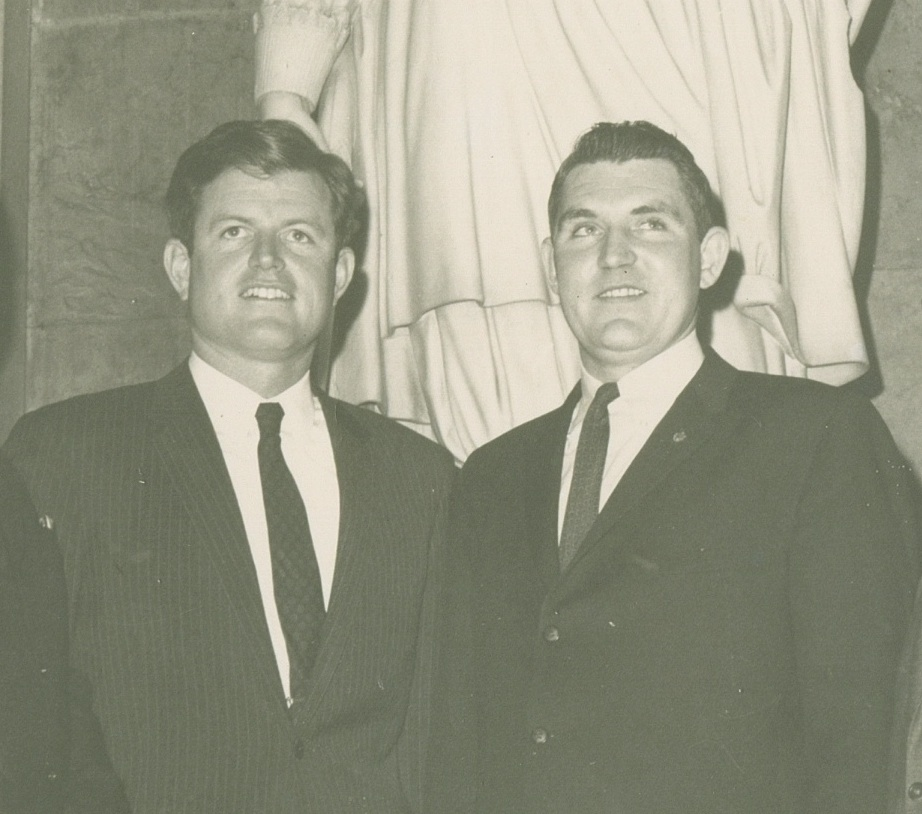

In 1968, Representative Hickey attended the Democratic National Convention at The Stockyard in Chicago with the Massachusetts Delegation to support Hubert H. Humphrey and Edmund Muskie.

In 1972 Hickey left the House and was appointed Deputy State Treasurer, a post he held until 1980, returning full-time as President and owner of the William T. Hickey & Son Funeral Home in Cambridge.

== Recent life ==
Hickey has retired from public service. He still resides in Cambridge with his wife, Patricia, and they spend their summers in Plymouth, Massachusetts. The Hickey's spend their winters in Deerfield Beach, Florida.

On October 19, 2005, Representative Hickey attended The 375th Anniversary of the General Court of Massachusetts. His guest for the celebration was his grandson, Timothy W. Mahoney.

Over the years Representative Hickey has always given credit to his success in public service to his late friend and mentor Edward J. Sullivan, a friendship that lasted over fifty years.
