= Steinkraus =

Steinkraus is a surname. Notable people with the surname include:

- Keith H. Steinkraus (1918–2007), American food scientist
- Lawrence W. Steinkraus (1922–1992), United States Air Force general
- William Steinkraus (1925–2017), American equestrian
