= Lewry =

Lewry is a surname. Notable people with the surname include:

- Jason Lewry (born 1971), English cricketer
- Osmund Lewry (1929–1987), English Dominican
- Scoop Lewry (1919–1992), Canadian politician and reporter

== See also ==
- Lawry
- Lewy (surname)
