= Corgoň =

1820 statue by Vavrinec Dunajský

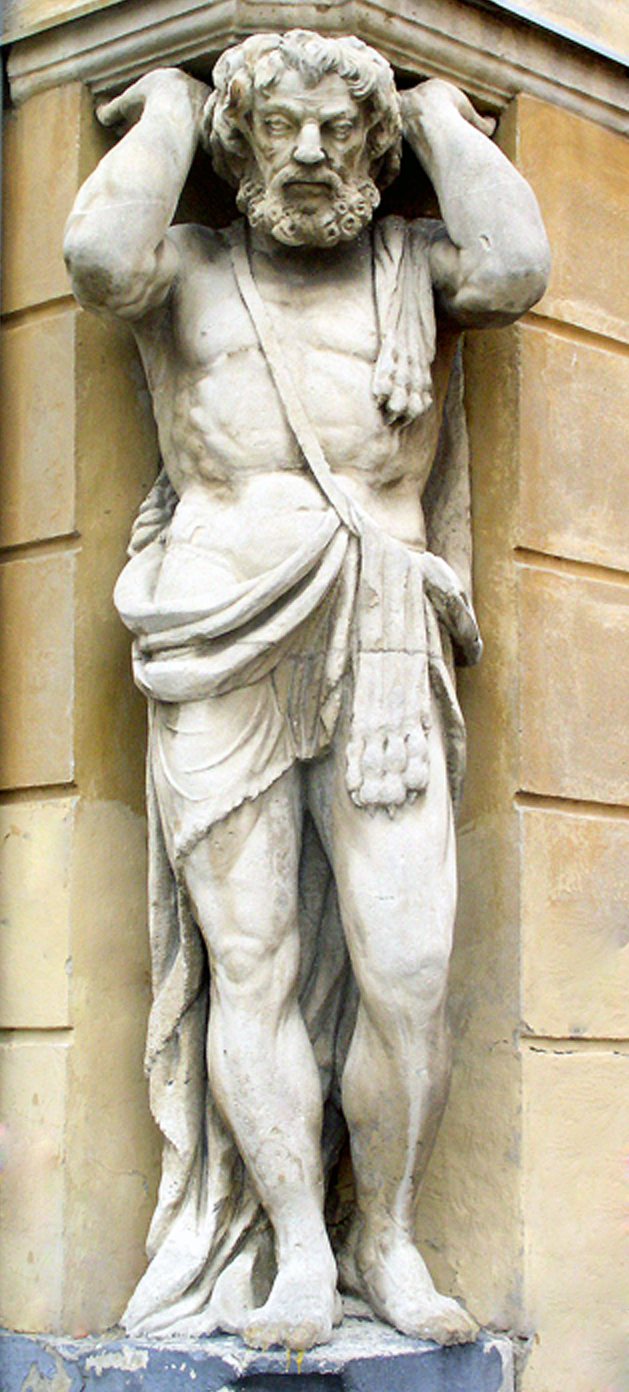

Corgoň (Slovak pronunciation: [ˈtsɔrɡɔɲ]) is a statue situated in Nitra, Slovakia. It was created by Vavrinec Dunajský in 1820. The sculpture is a famous landmark and symbol of Nitra.

According to the local legend, the real person called Corgoň was a metalworker in Nitra. He was a mighty man of a stocky build, his arms were muscled in particular. Whenever he hit the anvil with a hammer, the whole upper town would quake. He influenced the history of his town when the Ottoman Turks besieged the Nitra Castle. The invaders were just about to climb the castle walls when Corgoň appeared straight from the forge. He started rolling down huge stones, which brought havoc among the Turks. However, what scared them off more than the stones was the gigantic and coal-black smoke-filmed face of Corgoň. Seeing him, they set off for an immediate run. He was believed to be seen extracting those huge stones from a slope assisted by evil spirits. That was how Nitra's upper town managed to survive the first Ottoman attack. The statue of Corgoň would embody the invincible power of this local metalworker forever. There is a simile applied to someone who shows great power in the area surrounding Nitra which says to be as mighty as Corgoň.

In the statue, Corgoň is depicted as Atlas. According to a Greek legend, gods punished Atlas for his wrongdoings in a form of columns that he had to hold upright forever as to keep the sky from falling. Later on Atlas was depicted carrying a globe on his shoulders.

The artistic concept of the Atlas in Nitra lies in a symbolic holding up the entire floor, which might have its origin in a myth about Corgoň whose bravery kept the upper town safe from the Ottoman raids.

== See also ==
- Atlas (architecture)
- Slovak national heroes
- European national heroes
