= Laurie Walker =

Laurie Walker may refer to:

- Laurie Walker (footballer) (born 1989), English footballer
- Laurie Walker (artist) (1962–2011), Canadian artist

== See also ==
- Larry Walker (disambiguation)
- Laura Walker (disambiguation)
- Lawrence Walker (disambiguation)
