= Euchroite =

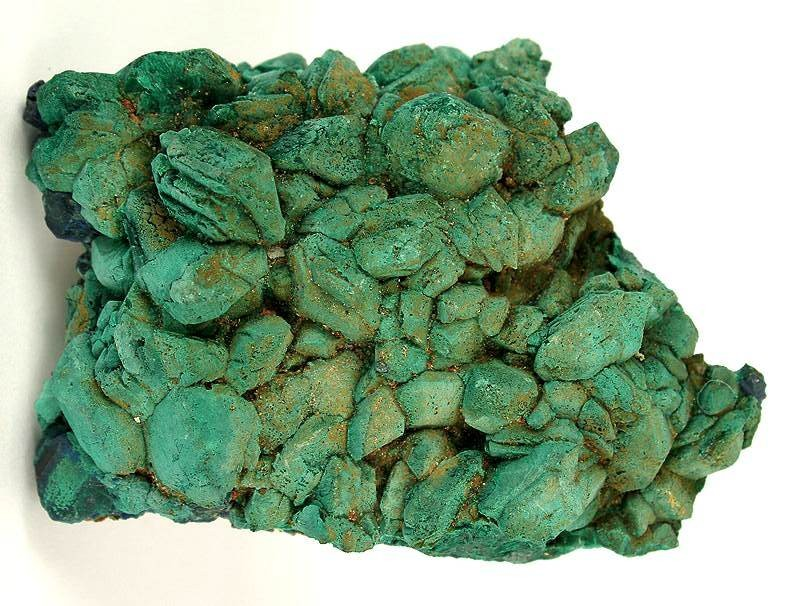

General
- Category: Arsenate minerals
- Formula: Cu_{2}AsO_{4}OH·3H_{2}O
- IMA symbol: Euc
- Strunz classification: 8.DC.07
- Crystal system: Orthorhombic
- Crystal class: Disphenoidal (222); H-M symbol: (2 2 2)
- Space group: P2_{1}2_{1}2_{1}

Euchroite is a hydrated copper arsenate hydroxide mineral with formula: Cu_{2}AsO_{4}OH·3H_{2}O. It is a vitreous green to emerald green mineral crystallizing in the orthorhombic system. It has a Mohs hardness of 3.5–4.0 and a specific gravity of 3.39–3.45. It was first described in 1823 in Ľubietová, Slovakia.
