= Libethenite =

Phosphate mineral

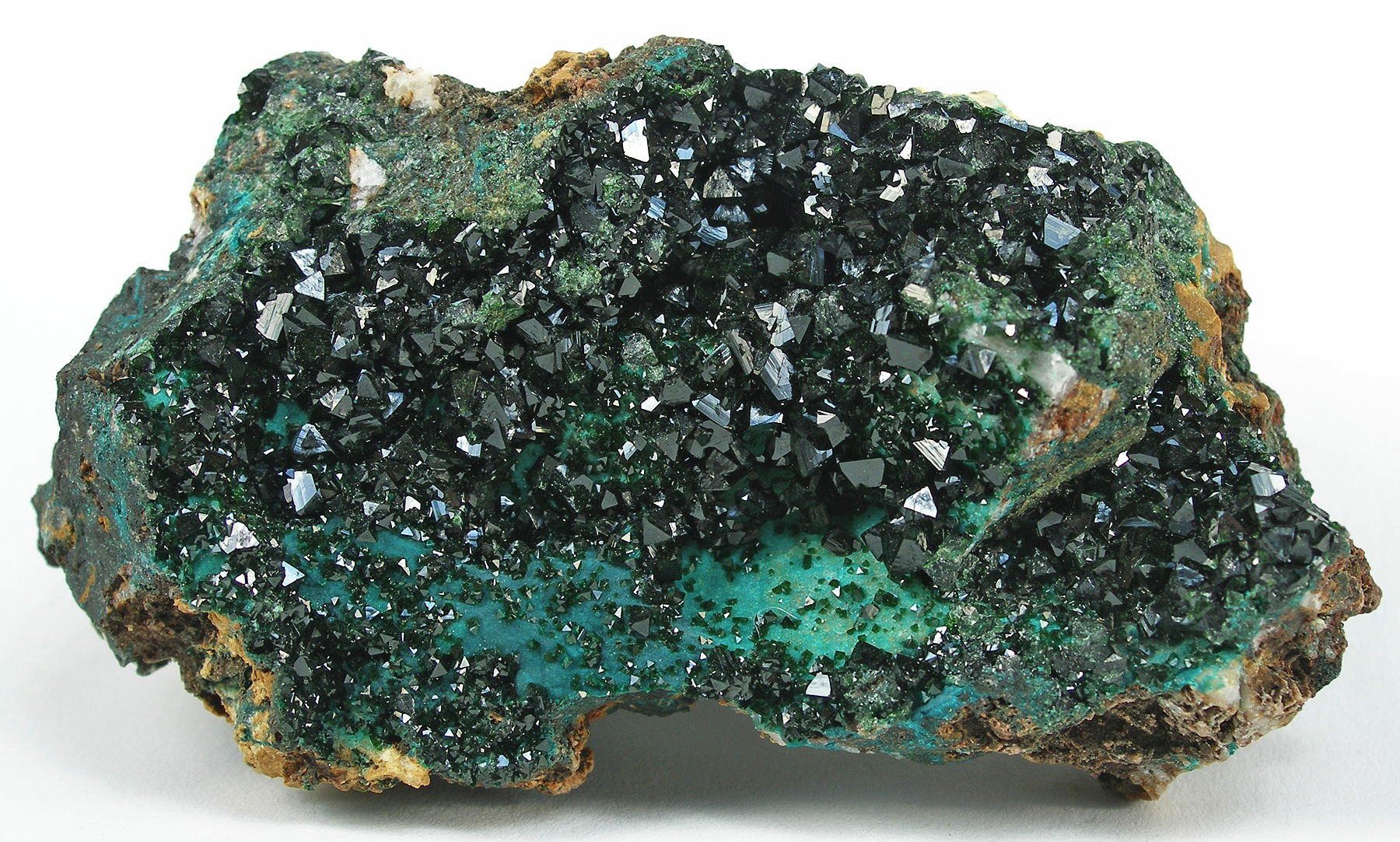

General
- Category: Phosphate minerals
- Formula: Cu_{2}PO_{4}OH
- IMA symbol: Lib
- Strunz classification: 8.BB.30
- Crystal system: Orthorhombic
- Crystal class: Dipyramidal (mmm); H-M symbol: (2/m 2/m 2/m)
- Space group: Pnnm

Identification
- Color: Light to dark green, blackish green, olive-green
- Crystal habit: Globular, druzy, slender prismatic
- Cleavage: Indistinct on [100] and [010]
- Fracture: Irregular, uneven to conchoidal
- Tenacity: Brittle
- Mohs scale hardness: 4
- Luster: Vitreous, greasy
- Streak: light green
- Specific gravity: 3.6 – 4, Average = 3.8
- Optical properties: Biaxial (−)
- Refractive index: nα = 1.701 – 1.704 nβ = 1.743 – 1.747 nγ = 1.787 – 1.790

Libethenite is a rare copper phosphate hydroxide mineral. It forms striking, dark green orthorhombic crystals. It was discovered in 1823 in Ľubietová, Slovakia and is named after the German name of that locality (Libethen). Libethenite has also been found in the Miguel Vacas Mine, Conceição, Vila Viçosa, Évora District, Portugal, and in Tier des Carrières, Cahai, Vielsaim, Stavelot Massif, Luxembourg Province, Belgium.

== Appearance ==
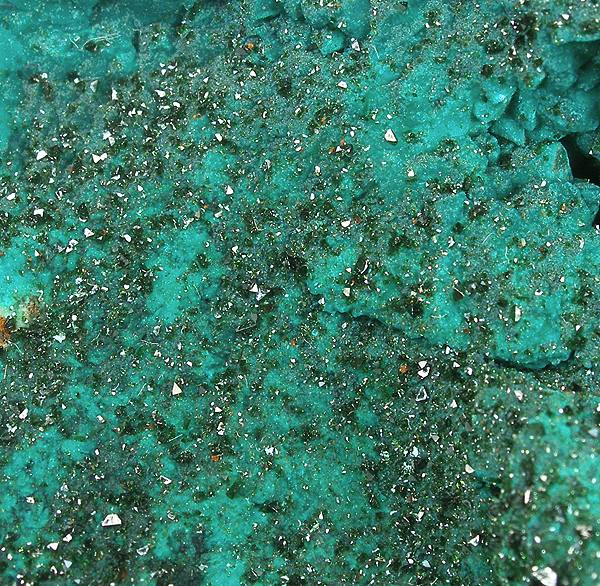
Detail of gemmy, emerald-green, orthorhombic libethenite microcrystals on malachite, from the type locality, Ľubietová, Slovakia. See File:Libethenite-258236.jpg for the full specimen.

Libethenite almost always takes the form of dark-green orthorhombic crystals. It is often found in clusters with other libethenite crystals.

== Formation ==
Libethenite is found in the oxidized zone of copper ore deposits. It is most often formed from the weathering of phosphate rocks such as apatite, monazite, and xenotime. There have been no confirmed findings of primary libethenite, although a probable case has been reported.
