= Laura Walker =

Laura Walker may refer to:

- Laura S. Walker (1861-1955), American author and conservationist
- Laura Ruth Walker (born 1957), American education and media executive
- Laura Walker (curler) (born 1990), Canadian curler
- Laura Walker (swimmer) (born 1970), American swimmer

== See also ==
- Lauren Walker (born 1989), English footballer
- Laurie Walker (disambiguation)
