= Roelof Oosthuizen =

South African cricketer

Personal information
- Born: 1894; Steynsburg, Cape Colony
- Died: 1947 (age 53); Steynsburg
- Nickname: Kalf
- Batting: Left-handed

Domestic team information
- Years: Team
- 1913–14: Border

Career statistics
Competition	First-class
Matches	1
Runs scored	24
Batting average	12.00
100s/50s	0/0
Top score	23
Balls bowled	114
Wickets	0
Bowling average	–
5 wickets in innings	0
10 wickets in match	0
Best bowling	–
Catches/stumpings	0/–
- Source: Cricinfo, 2 April 2017

Roelof Oosthuizen (1894 –1947) was a cricketer who played one match of first-class cricket for Border in 1913.

While aged 19 and a boarder at Selborne College in East London, Oosthuizen made his first-class debut for Border, alongside another Selbornian, Lawrence Miles, against the touring MCC in November 1913. He top-scored in Border's second innings with a hard-hitting 23. The MCC players rated him as one of the best young players in South Africa and presented him with an MCC cap.

Despite this initial success, Oosthuizen never played major cricket again. After he left school he returned to the family sheep farm in the Karoo. He fought with South African forces in the South West Africa campaign in World War I.

Oosthuizen died of heart failure at the family farm in 1947, leaving a widow, Elizabeth, and a son, Ochert.
