= Lawry =

Lawry is a surname. Notable people with the surname include:

- William Morris "Bill" Lawry (born 1937), Australian cricketer
- Frank Lawry (1839–1921), New Zealand politician
- Jo Lawry, Australian singer
- John Lawry (born 1950), musician
- Michael Lawry, New Zealand musician
- Otis Lawry (1893–1965), American baseball player
- Samuel Lawry (1854–1933), New Zealand Methodist minister
- William Lawry (born 1940), English cricketer

== See also ==
- Lawry's, a restaurant chain and brand of seasonings
- Lawrie, a surname and given name
