= Lawrie =

Lawrie is a (patronymic or paternal) family name of Scottish origin which means "crafty." Variants of which include: Laurie, Lorrie, Larry, Laury, Lawry and Lowrie. It is also used as a given name, often a short form of Lawrence.

== Surname ==
- Allan Lawrie (1886–1915), Scottish footballer
- Andy Lawrie (born 1978), Scottish footballer
- Bobby Lawrie (born 1947), Scottish footballer
- Brett Lawrie (born 1990), Canadian baseball player
- Corey Lawrie (born 1980), New Zealand rugby league player
- Deborah Lawrie (born 1953), Australian aviator
- Ellis Lawrie (1907–1978), Australian politician
- Gawen Lawrie (fl. 1675–1687), American politician
- Gerald Lawrie, (born 1945), Australian-born American surgeon
- James Lawrie (born 1990), Northern Irish footballer
- John Lawrie (1875–1951), Scottish-born Canadian politician
- Lee Lawrie (1877–1963), American sculptor
- Margaret Lawrie (1917–2003), anthropologist of the Torres Strait
- Nate Lawrie (born 1981), American National Football League player
- Paul Lawrie (born 1969), Scottish golfer
- Peter Lawrie (born 1974), Irish golfer

== Given name ==
- Laurie Ann Paul (born 1966), American professor of philosophy and cognitive science
- Lawrie Barratt (1927–2012), English accountant and businessman, founder of Barratt Developments
- Lawrie Knight (born 1949), New Zealand former rugby union player
- Lawrie McMenemy (born 1936), English former football manager
- Lawrie Minson (born 1958), Australian musician, guitarist and songwriter
- Lawrie Quinn (born 1956), British Labour Party politician
- Lawrie Sanchez (born 1959), Northern Irish football manager and former player

== See also ==
- Lawry, a surname
