= Wawrzyniec =

Wawrzyniec is a Polish masculine given name, corresponding to the English name Lawrence. Notable people with the name include:

- Wawrzyniec Cyl (1900-1974), Polish footballer
- Wawrzyniec Grzymała Goślicki (circa 1530-1607), Polish nobleman
- Wawrzyniec Mitzler de Kolof (1711-1778), Polish physician
- Wawrzyniec Samp (born 1939), Polish sculptor
- Wawrzyniec Staliński (1899-1941), Polish footballer
- Wawrzyniec Styczeń (1836-1908), Polish social activist
- Wawrzyniec Żmurko (1824-1889), Polish mathematician
- Wawrzyniec Żuławski (1916-1957), Polish alpinist
