= Lawrence Colvile Jackson =

British barrister and colonial judge (1851–1905)

Lawrence Colvile Jackson QC

1st Judicial Commissioner of the Federated Malay States
- In office 1896–1905
- Preceded by: Office created
- Succeeded by: William Henry Hyndman Jones

Personal details
- Born: 1851
- Died: 29 January 1905 (aged 53 or 54)
- Occupation: Barrister and colonial judge
- Nickname: J. K.

Lawrence Colvile Jackson (1851 – 29 January 1905) was a British lawyer and colonial judge who served as the first Judicial Commissioner of the Federated Malay States from 1896 to 1905.

== Early life and education ==
Jackson was born in 1851, the son of Sir Charles Robert Mitchell Jackson, Auditor to the India Office and Puisne Judge of the Supreme Court of Calcutta. He was educated privately and qualified as a solicitor in 1875. The following year, he became a student of Lincoln's Inn, and was called to the Bar at Lincoln’s Inn on 7 May 1879.

== Career ==
After qualifying, Jackson joined the Oxford Circuit. Later, he served as Examiner of the High Court of Justice, England. In 1895, he was appointed Queen's Counsel.

In July 1896, he went to British Malaya where he served as the first Judicial Commissioner of the Federated Malay States. The new office, introduced in 1896, was the final Court of Appeal for the Federation. It heard all capital cases, with death sentences passed to the Sultan in Council. He drafted the Rules of Procedure and the Rules of Admission of Advocates and Solicitors. In 1897, he decided an important Chinese intestacy case, ruling that English law does not apply in such case.

== Personal life and death ==
Jackson married Nina Goss in 1886.

During the latter part of his tenure Jackson's health began to fail and his duties were performed by Sir William Hyndman Jones. Jackson died on 29 January 1905.
