= Ľubietová =

Ľubietová Libetbánya
- Municipality
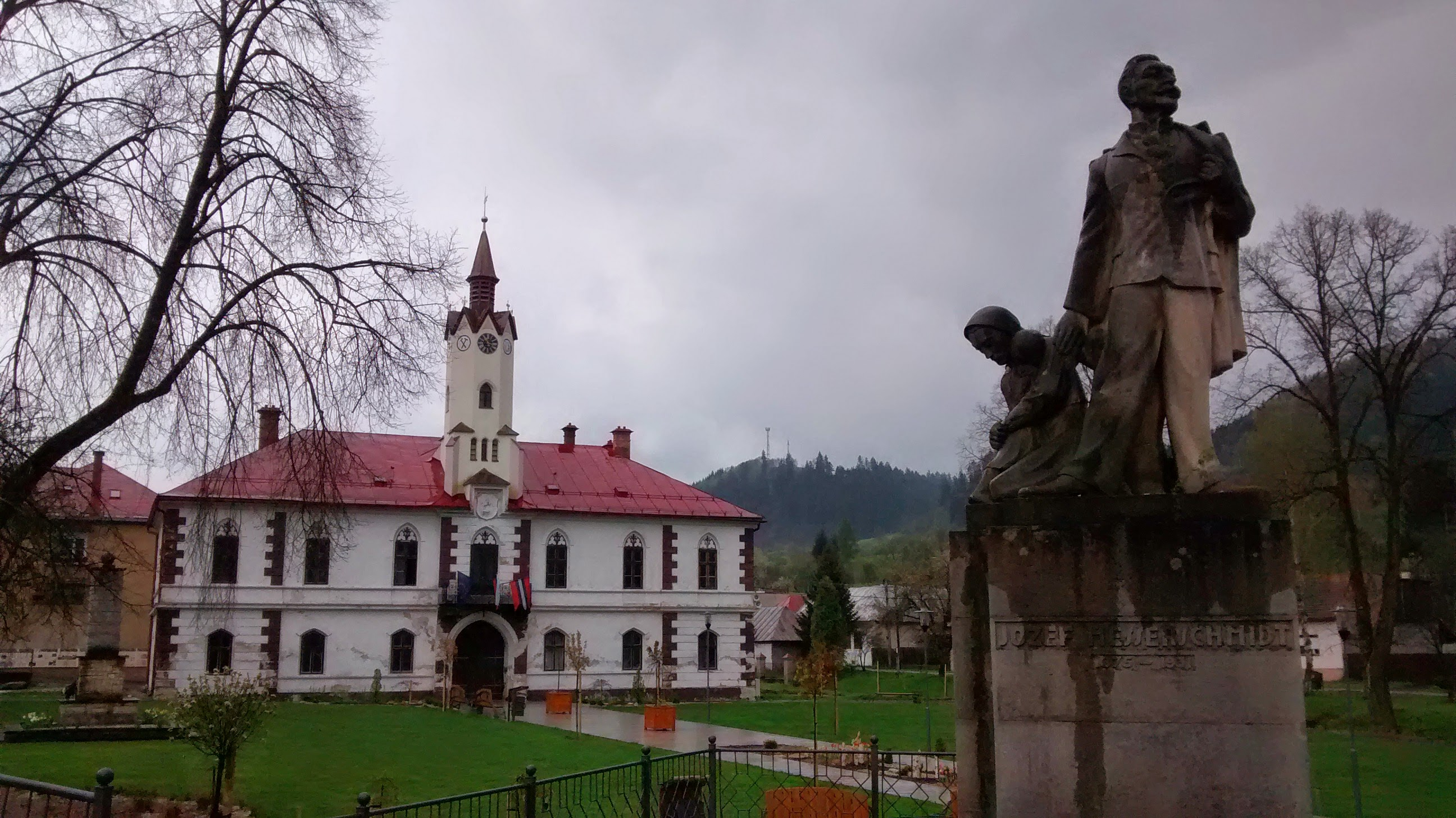

- Flag

- Location of Ľubietová in the Banská Bystrica Region Location of Ľubietová in Slovakia
- Coordinates: 48.75°N 19.37°E
- Country: Slovakia
- Region: Banská Bystrica Region
- District: Banská Bystrica District
- First mentioned: 1379

Government
  - Mayor: Pavel Zajac

Area
  - Total: 61.03 km^{2} (23.56 sq mi)
- Elevation: 471 m (1,545 ft)

Population (2025)
  - Total: 1,262
- Time zone: UTC+1 (CET)
  - Summer (DST): UTC+2 (CEST)
- Postal code: 976 55
- Area code: +421 48
- Vehicle registration plate (until 2022): BB
- Website: www.lubietova.sk

Ľubietová (German: Libethen; Hungarian: Libetbánya) is a village in central Slovakia. Originally an ancient mining town, it is known for precious minerals.

== Geography ==
Ľubietová is part of the Banská Bystrica District in the Banská Bystrica Region. It is situated 25 km east from the town of Banská Bystrica. The municipality lies at an altitude of 471 metres (1,545 ft) and covers an area of 61.03 km^{2} (23.56 sq mi) (2025). The geographic center of Slovakia, the Hrb mountain, is located near the village.

== History ==
Thanks to abundant deposits of copper and less rich deposits of iron ore, Ľubietová became soon an important center of medieval mining industry. It was granted the status of a royal town in 1379 by Louis the Great and German miners settled here. As one of the most important centers of Protestant Reformation in the country, the town created the Protestant "League of Seven Mining Towns" together with Banská Belá, Banská Bystrica, Banská Štiavnica, Kremnica, Nová Baňa, and Pukanec. In 1692, the first modern blast furnace in the Kingdom of Hungary was built in Ľubietová. Due to the decline of the mining industry in the 18th century, the settlement lost its urban character and became a village.

== Minerals ==
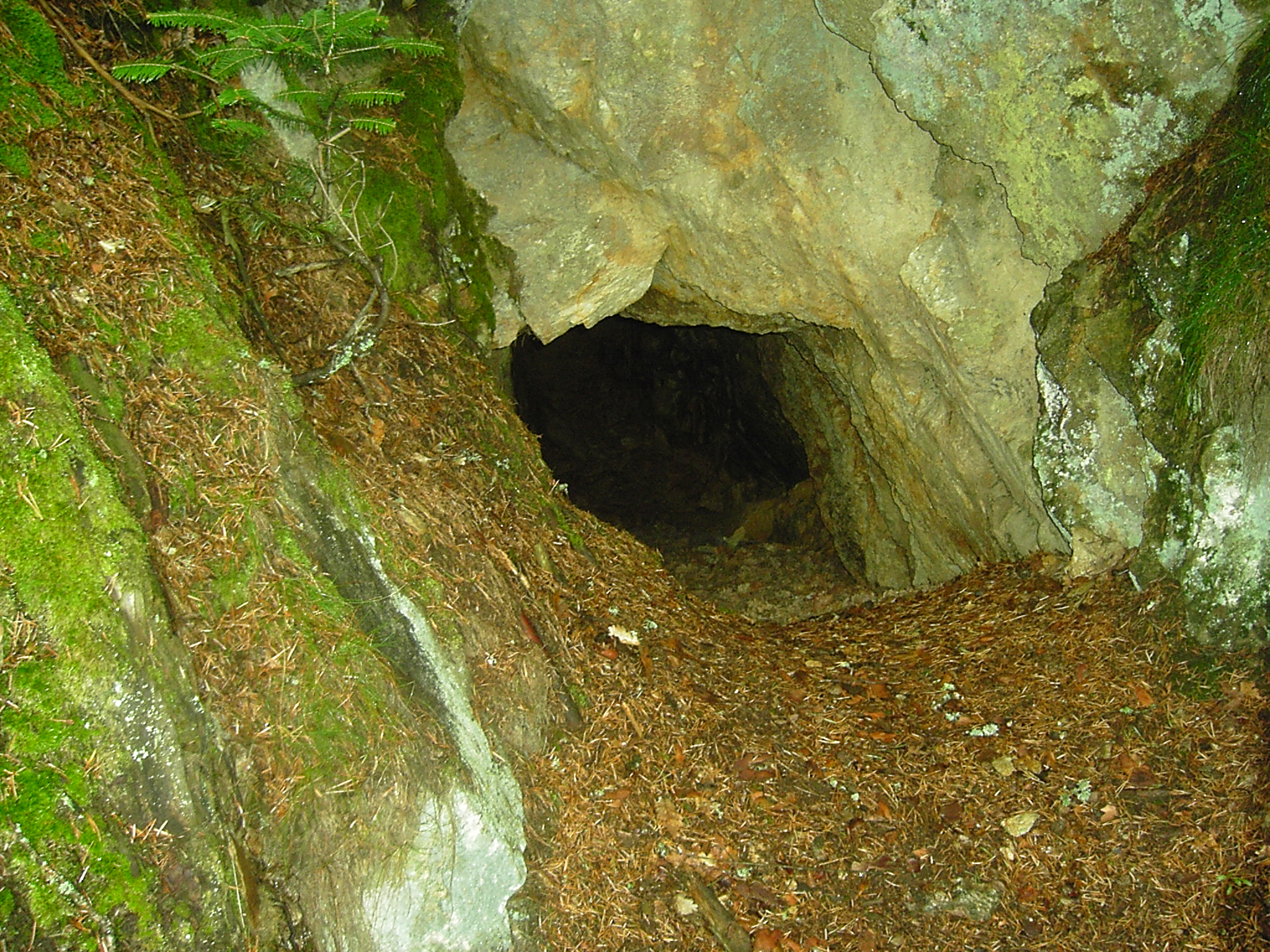
Entrance to an ancient copper mine near Ľubietová

Ľubietová is famous for precious minerals that can be found inside the ancient mines. For example, Libethenite was discovered there in 1823 and is named after the German name of the village (Libethen). Euchroite was also described for the first time in Ľubietová. The list of interesting minerals, mostly created by weathering of copper ores, also includes azurite and malachite.

== Population ==
Population statistic (10 years)
Year	1995	2005	2015	2025
Count	975	982	1204	1262
Difference		+0.71%	+22.60%	+4.81%

Population statistic
Year	2024	2025
Count	1269	1262
Difference		−0.55%

It has a population of 1262 people (31 December 2025).

=== Ethnicity ===
Census 2021 (1+ %)
Ethnicity	Number	Fraction
Slovak	1208	97.97%
Not found out	23	1.86%
Total	1233	

In year 2021 was 1233 people by ethnicity 1208 as Slovak, 23 as Not found out, 4 as Czech, 3 as English, 2 as Italian, 1 as Jewish, 1 as Ukrainian, 1 as Russian, 1 as Austrian, 1 as Polish and 1 as French.

Note on population: The difference values of population numbers in the table "Population statistic" and in the sections "Ethnicity" & "Religion" is caused by the use of various statistical methods.

=== Religion ===
Census 2021 (1+ %)
Religion	Number	Fraction
Evangelical Church	509	41.28%
None	378	30.66%
Roman Catholic Church	300	24.33%
Not found out	21	1.7%
Total	1233	

In year 2021 was 1233 people by religion 509 from Evangelical Church, 378 from None, 300 from Roman Catholic Church, 21 from Not found out, 8 from Seventh-day Adventist Church, 5 from Ad hoc movements, 4 from Other, 3 from Jehovah's Witnesses, 1 from Other and not ascertained christian church, 1 from Greek Catholic Church, 1 from United Methodist Church, 1 from Buddhism and 1 from Baptists Church.

According to the 2001 census, 98.5% of inhabitants were Slovaks. The religious makeup was 60.2% Lutherans, 27% Roman Catholics, and 8.2% with no religious affiliation.

== Famous people ==
- Vavrinec Dunajský, sculptor
