= Lawrence Nduga =

Ugandan footballer (born 1995)

Personal information
- Date of birth: 22 December 1995 (age 30)
- Place of birth: Kampala, Uganda
- Height: 1.68 m (5 ft 6 in)
- Position: Forward

Team information
- Current team: Orapa United F.C.

Senior career*
Years	Team	Apps	(Gls)
2012–2014	Kiira Young FC		
2014–2015	Simba FC		
2015–2016	Bright Stars FC		
2016–2017	Mormenekşe GB	13	(3)
2017–2018	Bul FC		
2018	Nkwazi F.C.		
2019	Sharps Shooting Stars FC		
2019–	Orapa United F.C.		

International career
2013	Uganda	1	(0)
- * Club domestic league appearances and goals

Lawrence Nduga (born 22 December 1995) is a Ugandan football striker who currently plays for Orapa United F.C.

== Football career ==
Nduga played for BUL FC.

He served on the technical team for Ggomba County in the 2026 Masaza Cup.
