= Lawrence B. Salkoff =

American neuroscientist (born 1944)

Lawrence B. Salkoff (born March 3, 1944) is an American neuroscientist and currently a professor of neuroscience and genetics at Washington University School of Medicine.

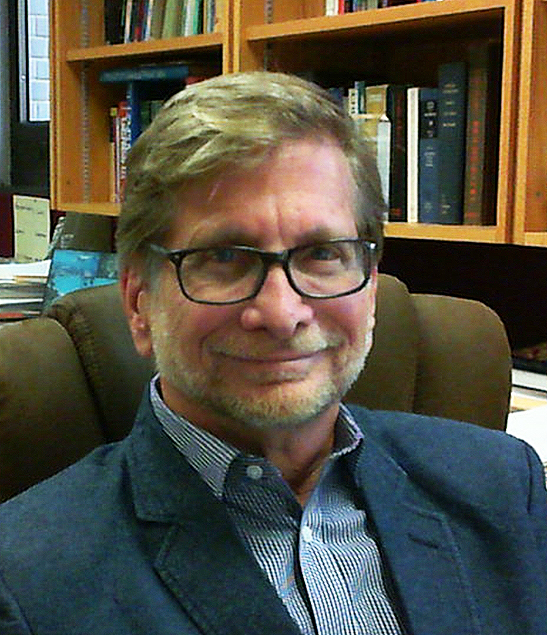
Lawrence B. Salkoff

== Early life and education ==
Salkoff received his Bachelor of Arts (B.A.) degree in economics in 1967 from University of California, Los Angeles. After graduation he volunteered in the United States Peace Corps working in Colombia, South America, from 1967 to 1970. Upon Salkoff's return to the United States he studied at the University of California, Berkeley, where he received his PhD in neurogenetics in 1979. Subsequently, Salkoff trained as a postdoctoral associate in neurogenetics at Yale University, in the laboratory of Professor Robert Wyman with consultation and aid from Professor Charles F. Stevens.

== Career ==
Salkoff's scientific career began in 1978 using Drosophila melanogaster as a model system before much detail was known about ion channel structure. As a graduate student he worked on the shibire mutant and characterized its defects in synaptic transmission.

Cloning of the extended family of potassium channel genes. The structure of potassium channels which shape the electrical activity in the nervous system was unknown when Salkoff was a graduate student. It was believed that one way to obtain the protein structure of a potassium channel was to identify a gene encoding the channel protein in a genetically tractable organism, and then combine newly developed tools in biophysics, molecular genetics, DNA sequencing in eukaryotes, and molecular cloning, to clone and sequence the gene and functionally express the encoded channel in a heterologous expression system. To this end, as a postdoctoral researcher, Salkoff adapted the voltage clamp technique to the fruit fly Drosophila which had been used by Alan Lloyd Hodgkin and Andrew Huxley to reveal the ionic basis of the nerve action potential. This enabled the direct observation of ion currents in a genetically tractable organism.

This technique was then used to show that the Drosophila Shaker gene was the structural gene for a potassium channel, a claim which was based on several genetic criteria and confirmed by biophysical analysis of the expected ion channel current phenotype. Thus, mutations of a structural gene should produce loss of function mutations where the gene product is absent or non-functional, gain of function mutations where the functional properties of the gene product is changed, and position effect mutations where a breakpoint near the gene reduces expression of a normal gene product. All three classes of mutations were found.

Salkoff also combined voltage-clamp technique with genetic analysis to reveal the location of the Shaker gene on the Drosophila polytene chromosome map. These studies validated the Shaker gene as the structural locus of a potassium channel and guided a chromosomal "walking" strategy to the physical location of the Shaker locus. It also had the effect of directing great attention to Drosophila as a model system combining molecular genetics with biophysical tools and enabled the study of ion channel biology using a comprehensive approach not possible in other systems.

Salkoff found a chromosomal breakpoint close to the Shaker gene showing the location of the Shaker gene on the physical chromosome map. Based on these findings Salkoff began a genomic DNA "walk" along the chromosome to clone the Shaker gene in conjunction with Patrick H. O'Farrell and Lily Jan but moved to Washington University in St. Louis before the project was finished. The project was completed by several laboratories.

After the initial cloning of the Shaker gene by several laboratories. Salkoff's laboratory used the Shaker cDNA as a stepping stone [using the technique of low stringency hybridization] with which to clone and functionally characterize the extended gene family of voltage-dependent potassium channels which in addition to Shaker, was designated Shab (Kv2), Shaw (Kv3) and Shal (Kv4). The Salkoff lab then showed that all families were conserved in mammals and were independent current systems that did not form heteromultimers between families. One or more of these genes expressing voltage-dependent potassium currents are expressed in virtually all vertebrate and invertebrate neurons. Salkoff's studies showed that an "essential set" of ion channels was conserved throughout the animal kingdom and was even present in primitive metazoan forms such as jellyfish, thus proving that the electrical properties of the nervous system developed early in evolution. This work contributed to one of the fundamental revelations of modern biology, that the basic genes and proteins that form complex animal life are highly conserved, having evolved only once, and presumably present in LUCA, the Last universal common ancestor to all current metazoan life.

In addition to the cloning and characterization of voltage-dependent potassium channels, Salkoff's lab also cloned and functionally characterized the "SLO" family of high conductance potassium channels. The discovery of a high conductance sperm¬specific potassium channel turned out to be the key to understanding membrane potential changes that occur during sperm capacitation; a knockout strain of the SLO3 potassium channel in mouse has turned out to be a valuable tool to investigate membrane potential dependent aspects of sperm physiology.

== Honors ==
Salkoff was the recipient of the "John Belling Prize in Genetics" and was a Research Fellow sponsored by the Muscular Dystrophy Association, the Esther A. and Joseph Klingenstein Fund, Inc. and the National Science Foundation.

Salkoff's published works are available in PubMed and in researchgate

Abstracts of Salkoff's completed and ongoing research projects supported by the National Institutes of Health are available at NIH RePorter
