= Lawrence Mynott =

British illustrator, designer and portrait painter (born 1954)

- Born: 1 March 1954 (age 72); London, UK
- Occupations: Book illustrator, designer and portrait painter
- Website: www.lawrencemynott.com

Lawrence Mynott (born 1 March 1954) is an English book illustrator, designer, and portrait painter.

== Biography ==
Mynott was born in London, UK on 1 March 1954. He graduated from the Chelsea School of Art and the Royal College of Art.

Mynott's paintings have enjoyed much commercial interest. He has provided illustrations for book covers for Penguin Books. He has also worked with publishers Thames and Hudson. His work has been exhibited at the Royal Society of Portrait Painters and at the National Portrait Gallery, London.

His writing has appeared in fashion magazines such as Tatler and Harper's Bazaar. He was featured in the "Games People Play" feature at The Independent in 1998.

Mynott lives with his wife graphic designer Anthea Mynott, in a "whimsical rooftop apartment" in Tangier.

== Books ==
- Pierre Bergé and Lawrence Mynott, Yves Saint Laurent: A Moroccan Passion, Abrams Books, 2014, ISBN 978-1419713491
- Tim Walker, Kit Hesketh-Harvey, The Granny Alphabet, illustrated by Lawrence Mynott, Thames & Hudson, 2013, ISBN 978-0500544266

== Awards ==
- Gold and Silver awards from the D&AD.
