= Lawrence Paros =

American alternative educator (1934–2019)

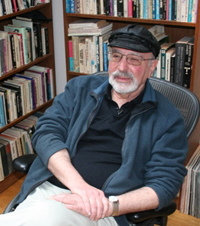
- Born: February 21, 1934; Springfield, Massachusetts, U.S.
- Died: July 3, 2019 (aged 85)
- Education: BA; MA;
- Alma mater: University of MA. Amherst; Yale University
- Occupations: Writer, educator, filmmaker
- Writing career
- Language: English

Lawrence Paros (February 21, 1934 – July 3, 2019) was an American author and educator, best known for his work in alternative education.

== Biography ==
Paros was born in Springfield, Massachusetts on February 21, 1934. He received a Bachelor of Arts in History and Political Science at University of Massachusetts in Amherst. Paros died on July 3, 2019, at the age of 85.

== Career ==
Paros taught high school in several places before becoming the chair of the History Department at Wilbur Cross High School in New Haven, Connecticut. While there, he developed an area-wide program on contemporary issues for high school students, which was described in a featured article in the Yale Alumni Magazine.

Paros was then appointed the director of the Yale Summer High School, a project to identify, recruit and educate talented youths living in poverty nationwide. 40 years later, he interviewed former students and staff members of the project, for a documentary film entitled Walk Right In, which was screened at a number of film festivals and educational facilities.

=== Alternative education ===
In Providence, Rhode Island, Paros established and directed two experimental schools: the Alternate Learning Project (ALP) and School One. The school was the subject of Hilda Calabro's Diversity or Conformity in the American High School.

=== Written and online work ===
Paros published works include Dancing on the Contradictions, a book about transformation in schools. His other published works include The Black and the Blue: The Story of the Other Yale, The Great American Cliché, The Erotic Tongue (Madrona and Henry Holt and Company), Bawdy Language (Kvetch Press), and Smashcaps (Avon).

His column, A Word with You, written in the early days of the internet, later served as the basis of a two volume work: A Word with You America.

Paros was also an op-ed page columnist for the Seattle Post-Intelligencer and a commentator on KUOW-FM in Seattle. His later works include three films: The Journey, the story of an immigrant's trek to America, Walk Right In, the story of the Yale Summer High School, and a short animated film, "Bawdy: The Movie."

== Bibliography ==
=== Non-fiction ===
- The Great American Cliché (Workman,1976),
- The Erotic Tongue (Madrona, Henry Holt,1984),
- Smashcaps (Avon,1995),
- A Word with you America (Kvetch Press, 1999),
- Bawdy Language (Kvetch Press, 2003),
- Dancing on the Contradictions (PP Press,2019),

=== Film/video ===
- The Journey
- Walk Right In
- Bawdy: The Movie
