= Lawrence Seymour Goodman =

British airman and bomber pilot (1920–2021)

- Born: 24 September 1920; London, England
- Died: 18 July 2021 (aged 100)
- Military career
- Allegiance: United Kingdom
- Branch: Royal Air Force
- Service years: 1940–1964
- Rank: Squadron Leader
- Nickname: Benny
- Units: Numbers 51, 53, 80, 604 (RAux AF) and 617 Squadrons RAF
- Conflicts: World War II/Cold War

Lawrence Seymour Goodman (24 September 1920 – 18 July 2021) was a British airman and bomber pilot, who served in World War II. He was the last surviving wartime pilot of the No. 617 Squadron RAF (a.k.a. the Dambusters) which carried out Operation Chastise, although he did not join the squadron until after the operation.

Known in 617 squadron as “Benny” Goodman, he completed 30 operations before the cessation of hostilities in May 1945. He then served with Transport Command. He was awarded the Légion d’honneur in 2016.

== Early life ==
Goodman was born in West London into a Jewish family according to AJEX and educated at Herne Bay College in Kent, where he became a member of the Officers' Training Corps.

In 1937, he enrolled in an electrical engineering course prior to joining his father's film and advertising business in London.

== Second World War ==
Shortly after the outbreak of the war, Goodman volunteered for the Royal Air Force Volunteer Reserve and was accepted for aircrew training. He joined the Royal Air Force (RAF) in 1940.

He was initially posted to RAF Abingdon as a ground gunner, before being posted to RAF Bridgnorth for general training. His initial flying training was conducted on a de Havilland Tiger Moth at Peterborough between June and August 1941.

Goodman completed his training in Canada at No. 33 Service Flying Training School (SFTS) at Carberry, Manitoba, and was awarded his flying badge on 24 April 1942, and commissioned as a Pilot Officer. He later became a flying instructor and trained at No. 8 Flying Instructor School, Reading before being sent as an instructor to No. 31 SFTS at Kingston, Ontario, to train Fleet Air Arm pilots on the North American Harvard.

=== Return to the UK ===
Goodman returned to the UK in September 1942 after an eventful passage across the Atlantic. He departed Halifax on a New Zealand vessel carrying women and children in addition to troops. A day or so out from Halifax, an escorting American destroyer was torpedoed by a U-boat, and Goodman's vessel was holed, his kit (including his flying logbook) being temporarily lost in the incident.

He arrived back in the UK on 11 September 1942, destined to train as a bomber pilot, after conversion to twin-engined aircraft, flying the Airspeed Oxford at No. 12 (Pilots) Advanced Flying Unit, Grantham. Promoted to flying officer, he graduated to the larger Vickers Wellington at No. 14 Operational Training Unit (OTU), Cottesmore, before transferring to No. 17 OTU at Silverstone to form his own crew.

Goodman was then promoted to flight lieutenant and was transferred to No. 1660 Conversion Unit at Swinderby.

=== Bomber Command ===
No. 617 Squadron was a special duties Squadron within No. 5 Group, based at Woodhall Spa in Lincolnshire. Composed of experienced bomber crews, it was equipped with Barnes Wallis's 12,000 lb “Tallboy” Deep Penetration bomb and a precision bombsight that required high flying skills and crew teamwork to achieve extreme accuracy. Goodman and his crew were part of an experiment by Air Vice-Marshal Sir Ralph Cochrane, Air Officer Commanding No. 5 Group, taking a few novice crews who were rated above average and who might quickly be able to assimilate the skills required to achieve No. 617 Squadron's high standards.

His first operation with No. 617 Sqn was on 18 August 1944, against the U-boat pens at La Pallice. Flying as a second pilot with one of the squadron's veteran crews, he familiarised himself with operational procedures. His first operation with his own crew, to Brest on 27 August, began eventfully when, shortly after takeoff, the wireless operator announced that his set was on fire. It was soon extinguished without significant damage and the crew continued on to their target.

Goodman flew on many notable operations. While waiting to take off for the squadron's second attack against the German battleship Tirpitz (29 October 1944) his aircraft narrowly avoided being hit on the ground by another aircraft which swung severely on takeoff. Returning from a deep penetration raid on the oil refinery at Politz (21/22 December 1944), Goodman alone brought his aircraft safely back to a fog-shrouded Woodhall Spa while the remainder of the squadron was forced to divert to other airfields, one of them subsequently crashing owing to poor visibility. During an operation against Hamburg (9 April 1945), the squadron was attacked by Messerschmitt Me 262 jet fighters.

While most of these operations were carried out using the Tallboy 12,000 lb bomb, Goodman got the opportunity to drop a 22,000 lb Grand Slam Deep Penetration bomb during an attack against the Arnsberg viaduct (19 March 1945). His bomb scored a direct hit.

=== Post-war RAF career ===
At the end of the war in Europe and completion of his first tour, Goodman transferred to Transport Command, serving with Nos. 51 and 53 Squadrons, flying Short Stirlings. After demobilization, he became a member of the Royal Auxiliary Air Force in 1946, flying Spitfire XVIs with No. 604 (County of Middlesex) Squadron. He re-joined the RAF in August 1949 as a Flight Lieutenant, and after a course flying Wellingtons at the Pilot Refresher Flying School, Finningley underwent further conversion to the Handley Page Hastings. Goodman joined No. 53 Sqn at Lyneham in March 1950, flying trooping movements to the Middle East and returning Korean War casualties, including Turkish, from Singapore. During a period spent on duties in Vienna and at the Air Ministry, London, Goodman maintained his flying rating on a variety of types, including the Avro Anson, de Havilland Chipmunk, and Percival Provost. He also experienced his first jet types, the de Havilland Vampire and Gloster Meteor.

Goodman was introduced to the Canberra at No. 231 Operational Conversion Unit, Bassingbourn, in September 1957, transferring to No. 237 (Photographic Reconnaissance) Operational Conversion Unit at Wyton prior to joining No. 80 (Photographic Reconnaissance) Sqn at Bruggen in Germany in November 1957. After completion of his tour, he was posted to the Air Ministry in London in 1960 and promoted to Squadron Leader in 1961. He retired from the Service in 1964.

Goodman held the Bomber Command Clasp, 1939-1945 Star, The Arctic Star, France and Germany Star, Defence Medal, War Medal 1939–1945, and the Légion d’honneur.

=== Post-RAF career ===
On leaving the RAF, Goodman re-joined the family business.

He obtained his British and American civil pilot's licences and flew a Piper Comanche, of which he was part-owner until he was 93 years old. He was a regular commentator for the Red Bull air races.

He was an active member of the No. 617 Squadron Association, meeting current service personnel and the public to talk about his RAF experiences and to raise funds for charitable causes, including the RAF Benevolent Fund. He took part in several documentaries on 617 squadron, including Channel 5’s “What the Dambusters Did Next” in 2013, where he got behind the controls of a Lancaster for the last time.

He also spoke at the Defence Academy, which enrolls officers from air forces around the world.

== Death ==
He died at the age of 100 on 18 July 2021.
