= Lavrentiy =

Lavrentiy (Russian: Лаврентий) is a Russian masculine given name.

- Lavrentiy Beria, Soviet politician
- Lavrentiy Tsanava, Soviet politician

== See also ==
- Lavrenti (given name)
- Lavrentis (name)
- Laurentius (disambiguation)
