= William Lawry =

English cricketer

Personal information
- Full name: William Justus Lawry
- Born: 24 April 1940 (age 86); St Just, Cornwall, England
- Batting: Left-handed
- Bowling: Wicketkeeper

Domestic team information
- Years: Team
- 1965 & 1969: Minor Counties
- 1958-1980: Cornwall

Career statistics
Competition	FC	LA
Matches	3	3
Runs scored	13	1
Batting average	13.00	1.00
100s/50s	–/–	–/–
Top score	9	1
Balls bowled	–	–
Wickets	–	–
Bowling average	–	–
5 wickets in innings	–	–
10 wickets in match	–	–
Best bowling	–	–
Catches/stumpings	8/–	2/–
- Source: Cricinfo, 18 October 2010

William Justus Lawry (born 24 April 1940) is a former English cricketer. Lawry was a left-handed batsman who played primarily as a wicketkeeper. He was born at St Just, Cornwall.

Lawry made his Minor Counties Championship debut for Cornwall in 1958 against Berkshire. From 1958 to 1980, he represented the county in 65 Minor Counties Championship matches, the last of which came against Devon.

Lawry also represented Cornwall in 3 List A matches. These came against Glamorgan in the 1970 Gillette Cup, Lancashire in the 1977 Gillette Cup and Devon in the 1980 Gillette Cup. In his 3 List A matches, he scored 1 run. Behind the stumps he took 2 catches.

He also played first-class cricket for a combined Minor Counties team. His first-class debut came against the touring South Africans in 1965. In 1969, he played his final 2 first-class matches for the team against the touring West Indians and the touring New Zealanders. In his 3 first-class he scored 13 runs at an average of 13.00, with a high score of 9. Behind the stumps he took 8 catches.
