= Lawrence Svobida =

American farmer and author (1908–1984)

Lawrence Svobida (June 15, 1908 – August 3, 1984) was an American farmer during the Dust Bowl and Great Depression and American writer. He is known for his work Farming the Dust Bowl: A First-Hand Account from Kansas, which was published in 1940, in which he details his experiences as a farmer in Oklahoma, Kansas, and the Great Plains region from 1929 to 1939. He was married to Agnes Svobida (October 20, 1913 - March 26, 1991). He also wrote An Empire of Dust about the Dust Bowl. He is buried in Pleasant Grove Cemetery in Cove, Polk County, Arkansas.
