= Lawrence "Teddy Boy" Houle =

Métis fiddler (1938–2020)

- Also known as: Tay-basse-gay-inin
- Born: Lawrence Houle; 1938; Ebb and Flow, Manitoba, Canada
- Origin: Canadian
- Died: 2020 (aged 81–82)
- Genres: Folk, Métis fiddling
- Instruments: Fiddle, vocals, jig
- Labels: Sunshine Sound Studios

Lawrence "Teddy Boy" Houle (1938–2020) was Métis fiddler from Ebb and Flow, Manitoba. He started to play at an early age, reportedly teaching himself to play "Red River Valley" on one string. Houle went on to become an influential fiddler and vocalist, recording a number of albums and maintaining an active performance schedule.

Houle was of Anishinaabe ancestry and had a challenging childhood. His father was absent from his life and his step-father did not value his musical talents.

As part of the folk revival movement in the 1960s, Houle performed at festivals such as the Mariposa Folk Festival He also appeared as a fiddler in several films, including "Spirit Rider" and "Medicine Fiddler."

In keeping with the Métis fiddling style, Houle often jigged while playing. His musical style followed Métis and indigenous traditions, and he was committed to recovering his Anishinabe heritage during the last twenty years of his life. He undertook deliberate projects aimed at recovery and renewal of the Ojibway language, including releasing several recordings of Ojibway music. He served as an Elder and cultural resource person at Métis Calgary Family Service Society where he facilitated a variety of workshops.

== Discography ==
- Old Native And Métis Fiddling in Manitoba, Vols 1 & 2, Falcon FP – 187 and 287 – 1987
- Houle, L. T. B., Houle, L. T. B., & Manitoba Association for Native Languages. (n.d.). Anishinaabe Christmas. Winnipeg, MB: Sunshine Sound Studios.
- Benitez, J. E., Lorenzano, A., Silva, M., Silva, M., Nayap, P., Xal, M. M., Coc, C., ... Lee Cremo Trio,. (1997). Wood that sings : Indian Fiddle Music of the Americas.

== See also ==
- Lederman, Anne. "Native and Métis Fiddling: Portrait of a People," Fiddler Magazine Vol. 8, Winter 2001
- Haigh, Chris. "Canadian Fiddle". Fiddling around the World.
