= Lawrence Olson =

American historian (1918–1992)

Lawrence Olson (May 7, 1918 – March 17, 1992) was an American historian specializing in Japan who served as the professor of history at Wesleyan University. In 1987, the Government of Japan honored him with the Order of the Sacred Treasure, the highest honor available to a foreigner, in recognition of his efforts in raising awareness of Japan in the United States. He was a professor of history at Wesleyan University.

== Early years ==
Born on May 7, 1918, in Memphis, Tennessee, Olson grew up in Mississippi and received his undergraduate training at the University of Mississippi, graduating in 1938. He completed a Master of Arts at Harvard University in 1939 and following the interruption of the Second World War, earned his doctorate there in 1955. During World War II, Olson graduated from the United States Navy Japanese Language School in Boulder, Colorado. He served in naval intelligence as a lieutenant with the Pacific Fleet Radio Unit, Station HYPO, at Pearl Harbor, Hawaii. This unit intercepted and attempted to decipher the Japanese military code messages.

== Academic career ==
After the end of the war, Olson worked at the Central Intelligence Agency in Washington DC between 1948 and 1950, and he served as cultural attaché at the American embassy in Manila, Philippines from 1951 to 1952, before finishing his PhD at Harvard. In 1955, he joined the American Universities Field Staff, an educational foundation dedicated towards providing in-depth studies of contemporary foreign society. He lived in Japan for the majority of the next twelve years, serving initially as a staff associate with the body. From 1962 to 1966 he was a senior staff associate. He and his family also retained a home in Manchester, Massachusetts, during that period. He returned to the United States to take up an academic post.

Olson was responsible for developing the program in Asian studies at Wesleyan University, Middletown, Connecticut. He served on the faculty at the school from 1966 until his retirement in 1986. He continued his scholarly work after retirement, and his new book, Ambivalent Moderns: Portraits of Japanese Cultural Identity, was published in the month he died.

Olson wrote many pieces on the social, political, and economic issues that faced Japan in that era. His work was important reading for U.S. government officials and others concerned with making policy towards Japan. He also lectured extensively on Japan. In addition to his new book, he authored Dimensions of Japan (1963) and Japan in Postwar Asia (1970), as well as a poetry anthology, The Cranes on Dying River and Other Poems (1947). Olson knew the importance of language and history in the study of East Asia and drew upon these in his own writing and teaching about Japan.

He was decorated in 1987 by the Government of Japan with the Order of the Sacred Treasure in recognition of his role in spreading knowledge of Japan in the United States.

Olson died of cancer at his home in Washington, D.C., on March 17, 1992.
