= Lawrence Simon =

American otolaryngologist (born 1977)

Lawrence "Larry" Mariano Simon (born 1977) is a former director of pediatric otolaryngology and current assistant clinical professor of otolaryngology at Louisiana State University.

== Education and career ==
Simon was born and raised in Lafayette, Louisiana. He graduated from Louisiana State University with a degree in biochemistry. Following his graduation from LSU, he became obtained an MD and became a resident in otolaryngology at Baylor College of Medicine in Houston, Texas. He then pursued fellowship in pediatric otolaryngology at Rady Children's Hospital in San Diego, California. Following training, for four years, Lawrence Simon worked in the field of academic medicine at the Department of Otolaryngology-Head and Neck Surgery, LSU. For two additional years he served as director of pediatric otolaryngology at Children's Hospital of New Orleans until he became a private practitioner in 2013 and became a director of Blue Cross and Blue Shield of Louisiana by September 2017.

Dr. Simon is known for his service to Otolaryngology and Quality Pillar Advisory Councils and is a member of Annual Meeting Program and Practice Management Education Committees. Besides being a private practitioner, Simon does various civic duties. From 2018 to 2019 he served as president-elect of the Rotary Club of Lafayette-North and was reelected for a second term starting from 2019. He is also an elected chair of the Healthcare Campaign of the Acadiana branch of the United Way and is sitting on an Advisory Council of Ogden Honors College of Ogden College and Lafayette Animal Shelter and Care Center.

== Awards and honors ==
- Fellow of the American Academy of Pediatrics
- Fellow of the American College of Surgeons (2014)
- Fellow of the American Academy of Otolaryngic Allergy
- Member of the American Medical Association
