= Lawrence Miles (cricketer) =

South African cricketer (1896–1967)

Personal information
- Full name: Lawrence Edgar Miles
- Born: 27 March 1896; Whittlesea, Cape Colony
- Died: 17 November 1967 (aged 71); East London, Cape Province, South Africa
- Batting: Left-handed

Domestic team information
- Years: Team
- 1913–14 to 1933–34: Border

Career statistics
Competition	First-class
Matches	28
Runs scored	1051
Batting average	21.02
100s/50s	0/5
Top score	98
Balls bowled	451
Wickets	8
Bowling average	34.50
5 wickets in innings	0
10 wickets in match	0
Best bowling	2/13
Catches/stumpings	16/–
- Source: Cricinfo, 2 April 2017

Lawrence Edgar Miles (27 March 1896 – 17 November 1967) was a cricketer who played first-class cricket for Border from 1913 to 1934.

While aged 17 and a student at Selborne College in East London, Miles made his first-class debut for Border, alongside another Selbornian, Roelof Oosthuizen, against the touring MCC in November 1913. He next played for Border with the resumption of first-class cricket after World War I, and was a regular member of the team during the 1920s, sometimes as captain. He captained a Cape Province team against the MCC in 1930–31.

He was a middle-order batsman whose highest score was 98 against Natal in the Currie Cup in 1923–24.

Miles married Molly McCann in August 1929. He died in East London in 1967.
