= Lawrence Frederik Schott =

American bishop (1907–1963)

- Auxiliary Bishop of Harrisburg
- In office: 1956-1963

Orders
- Ordination: July 15, 1935
- Consecration: May 1, 1956

Personal details
- Born: July 26, 1907 Philadelphia, Pennsylvania
- Died: May 11, 1963 (aged 55)
- Denomination: Roman Catholic

Lawrence Frederik Schott (July 26, 1907 – May 11, 1963) was an American prelate of the Roman Catholic Church who served as Auxiliary Bishop of the Diocese of Harrisburg, Pennsylvania from 1956 to 1963.

== Biography ==
Born in Philadelphia, Pennsylvania, Schott was ordained to the priesthood on July 15, 1935.

He was appointed Auxiliary Bishop of Harrisburg on March 1, 1956, and Titular Bishop of 'Eluza'. Schott was consecrated on May 1, 1956. He died while still in office.

== Notes ==
Catholic Church titles
Preceded by –	Auxiliary Bishop of Harrisburg; 1956–1963	Succeeded by –
