= Lavrenti =

Lavrenti is a Russian masculine given name.

Notable persons:

- Lavrenti Lopes, Indian actor and former model in Hollywood
- Lavrenti Son, Koryo-saram playwright and author of short stories
- Lavrenti Ardaziani, Georgian writer and journalist

== See also ==
- Lavrente Calinov, Romanian sprint canoer
- Lavrentiy (given name)
- Lavrentis (name)
- Laurentius (disambiguation)
