= Lawrence Pondani =

Zambian footballer (born 1986)

Personal information
- Date of birth: 27 September 1986 (age 40)
- Place of birth: Lusaka, Zambia
- Position: Midfielder

Senior career*
Years	Team	Apps	(Gls)
2006–2017	Red Arrows F.C.		

International career
2009	Zambia	1	(0)
- * Club domestic league appearances and goals

Lawrence Pondani (born 27 September 1986) is a Zambian football midfielder who played for Red Arrows F.C.
