= William Henry Hyndman Jones =

British colonial judge and judicial official

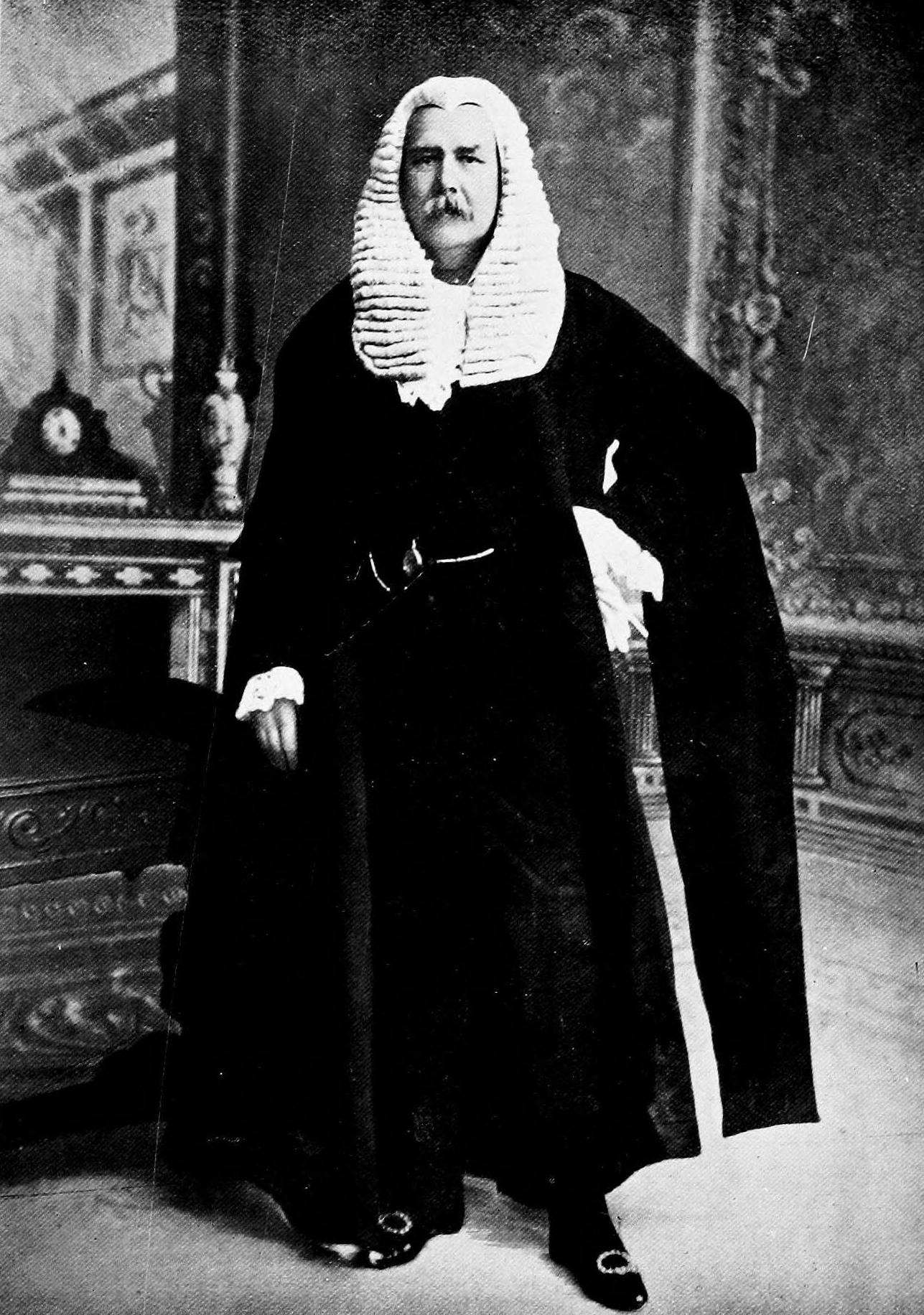
- William Henry Hyndman Jones circa 1908
- Born: 9 August 1847; Liverpool
- Died: 20 August 1926 (aged 79); Bournemouth
- Education: Trinity College, Cambridge
- Occupation: Barrister

Sir William Henry Hyndman Jones (9 August 1847 – 20 August 1926) was a British colonial judge and administrator.

William Henry Hyndman Jones was born on 9 August 1847 in Liverpool. He attended Marlborough College and Trinity College, Cambridge, was admitted to Lincoln's Inn on 21 November 1870, and was called to the bar of Lincoln's Inn on 3 July 1878.

In 1880, two years after his call to the bar, he went to Barbados to review the operations of its police force. One year later, he became an acting judge of the Barbados Court of Appeal. In 1883, he was the chief justice of both Saint Lucia and Tobago, as well as the attorney general and a member of the executive council of either or both colonies. He held various judicial and administrative positions in Jamaica from 1887 to 1896.

Hyndman Jones was sent to the Straits Settlements in 1896. He became the acting judicial commissioner of the Federated Malay States in 1903 and chief judicial commissioner effective 1 January 1906. In August 1906, he became the chief justice of the Straits Settlements. He retired in 1914.

He was appointed a knight bachelor in 1906.

Hyndman Jones died on 20 August 1926 in Bournemouth, England.
