= Vavrinec Dunajský =

Slovak sculptor

Vavrinec Dunajský (born 15 July 1784 in Ľubietová, died 15 February 1833 in Budapest) was a Slovak sculptor.

He is most famous for his work called the statue of Corgoň at The Canon House in Nitra. Vavrinec Dunajský also built the main altar in The Church of the Holy Cross with its picturesque figurines of the Virgin Mary and Magdalene in Banská Bystrica.
