= Vavrinec, Vranov nad Topľou District =

Vavrinec
- Municipality
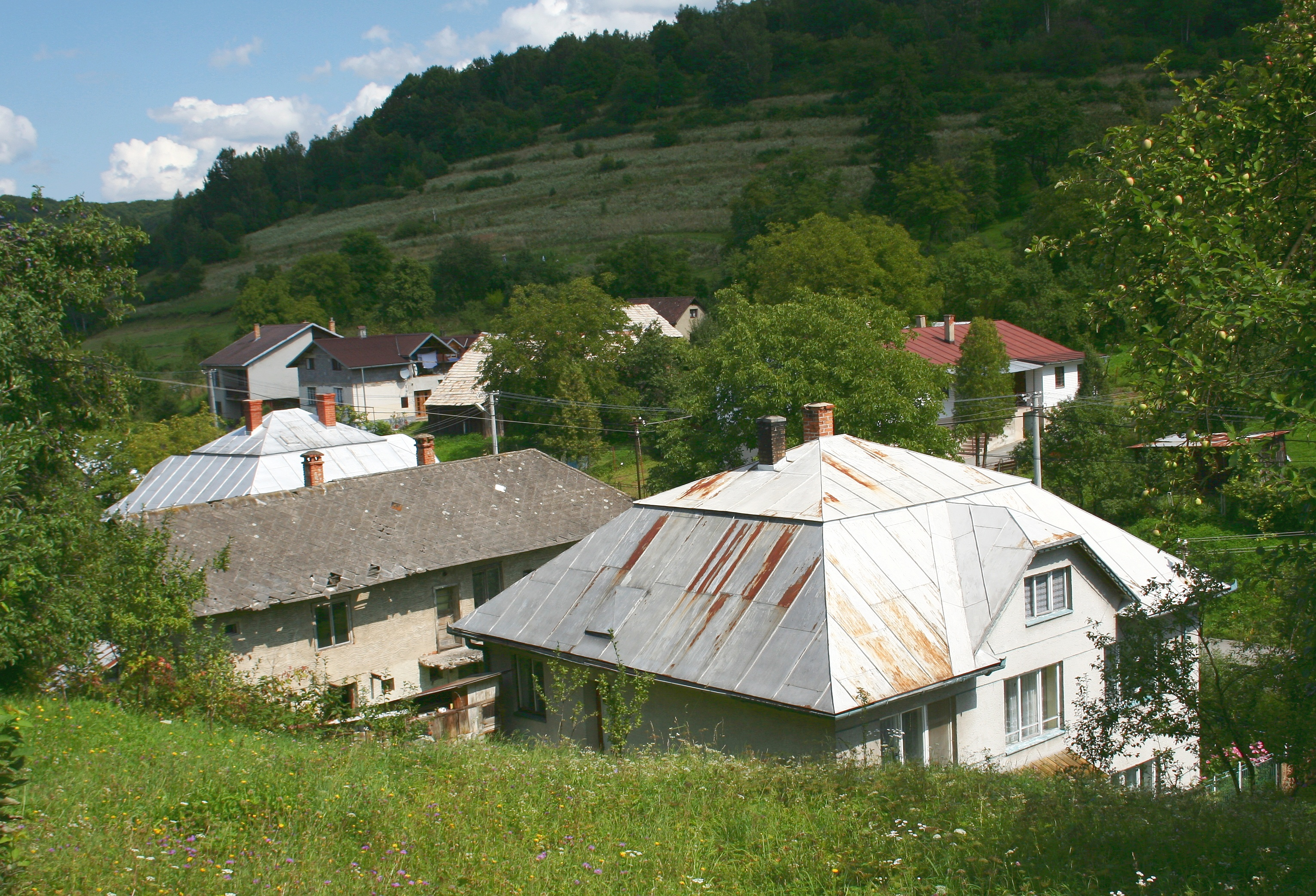

- Flag

- Location of Vavrinec in the Prešov Region Location of Vavrinec in Slovakia
- Coordinates: 49°03′N 21°36′E
- Country: Slovakia
- Region: Prešov Region
- District: Vranov nad Topľou District
- First mentioned: 1363

Area
  - Total: 5.44 km^{2} (2.10 sq mi)
- Elevation: 281 m (922 ft)

Population (2025)
  - Total: 55
- Time zone: UTC+1 (CET)
  - Summer (DST): UTC+2 (CEST)
- Postal code: 943 1
- Area code: +421 57
- Vehicle registration plate (until 2022): VT
- Website: www.obecvavrinec.sk

Vavrinec (Hungarian: Lőrincvágása, until 1899: Vavrinecz; Rusyn: Ваврінець) is a village and municipality in Vranov nad Topľou District in the Prešov Region of eastern Slovakia.

== History ==
In historical records the village was first mentioned in 1363.

== Geography ==
The municipality lies at an altitude of 281 metres (922 ft) and covers an area of 5.44 km^{2} (2.10 sq mi) (2025).

== Population ==
Population statistic (10 years)
Year	1995	2005	2015	2025
Count	74	62	60	55
Difference		−16.21%	−3.22%	−8.33%

Population statistic
Year	2024	2025
Count	59	55
Difference		−6.77%

It has a population of 55 people (31 December 2025).

=== Ethnicity ===
Census 2021 (1+ %)
Ethnicity	Number	Fraction
Slovak	52	94.54%
Not found out	5	9.09%
Rusyn	2	3.63%
Russian	1	1.81%
Total	55	

In year 2021 was 55 people by ethnicity 52 as Slovak, 5 as Not found out, 2 as Rusyn and 1 as Russian.

Note on population: The difference values of population numbers in the table "Population statistic" and in the sections "Ethnicity" & "Religion" is caused by the use of various statistical methods.

=== Religion ===
Census 2021 (1+ %)
Religion	Number	Fraction
Greek Catholic Church	44	80%
Roman Catholic Church	6	10.91%
Not found out	2	3.64%
Other	1	1.82%
Evangelical Church	1	1.82%
None	1	1.82%
Total	55	

In year 2021 was 55 people by religion 44 from Greek Catholic Church, 6 from Roman Catholic Church, 2 from Not found out, 1 from Other, 1 from Evangelical Church and 1 from None.
