= Lawrence Hamner Brinker =

American politician (born 1950)

Member of the South Carolina House of Representatives from the 119th district
- In office 1979–???

Personal details
- Born: March 4, 1950 (age 76)
- Education: The Citadel

Lawrence Hamner Brinker (born March 4, 1950) is an American politician. He served as a member for the 119th district of the South Carolina House of Representatives.

== Life and career ==
Brinker attended James Island High School and The Citadel.

In 1979, Brinker was elected to represent the 119th district of the South Carolina House of Representatives.
