= Lawrence Lovasik =

Priest and author (1913–1986)

Fr. Lawrence Lovasik SVD
- Born: Lawrence George Lovasik; 22 June 1913; Tarentum, Pennsylvania
- Died: 9 June 1986 (aged 72)
- Education: Divine Word minor seminary and college Divine Word Major Seminary; Pontifical Gregorian University

Lawrence Lovasik, was a Catholic priest and member of the missionary Society of the Divine Word. Lovasik wrote more than 30 books and 75 pamphlets.

== Life ==
Lovasik was born on June 22, 1913, in Tarentum, Pennsylvania to Stephen and Mary Salisbury Lovasik. He attended primary school at Saint Clement School before continuing on to Divine Word minor seminary and college in Girard, Pennsylvania. He graduated in 1931.

Lovasik then entered St. Mary's Mission Seminary in Techny, Illinois, where he graduated in 1938. After completing his theological studies at the Pontifical Gregorian University in Rome, Father Lovasik was ordained a missionary priest of the Society of the Divine Word on August 14, 1938.

Lovasik was assigned to St. Paul's Mission House in Epworth, Iowa (1939–1941) where he helped prepare students for the priesthood. He spent several years as a teacher and Prefect of Seminarians for the Society of the Divine Word. He was assigned to do missionary work in the coal and steel regions of the United States. He was fluent in Slovak and published a prayer book and brochures for Slovak speakers in Pennsylvania congregations.

In 1954, Father Lovasik initiated the Sisters of the Divine Spirit, a missionary congregation of women religious, which later became the Congregation of the Divine Spirit. In 1967, he founded the Family Service Corps, a secular institute devoted to charitable work for the sick, elderly and needy. The facilities operated by the Family Service Corps were later turned over to the Vincentian Sisters of Charity.

Lovasik took up writing to reach a greater audience than he could by preaching. In 1962 he published his work "The Hidden Power of Kindness" (El Poder Oculto de la Amabilidad). Lovasik said his life's ideal was to make God more known and loved through his writings. He published more than 30 books and over 75 pamphlets including prayer books, Bible stories for children, lives of the saints, and catechisms. This includes the Saint Joseph Confirmation Book.

Father Lovasik retired from missionary work in 1982. He died on June 9, 1986, in Techny, Illinois.
