= Lawrence Moptyd =

English priest and academic (died 1557)

Lawrence Moptyd was a priest and academic in the mid sixteenth century.

Moptyd was born in Foulden. He was educated at Corpus Christi College, Cambridge, graduating B.A. in 1530; MA in 1533; and B.D. in 1549. He was a Fellow of Gonville Hall for many years; and Master of Corpus from 1553 to 1557. He held livings at Haslingfield and Teversham. He died at the Master's Lodge on 7 December 1557.
