= Lavrentis =

Lavrentis is a Greek given name and surname

- Lavrentis Dianellos, Greek actor
- Lavrentis Machairitsas, Greek rock musician
- Ioannis Lavrentis, Greek athlete

== See also ==
- Lavrentios Alexanidis, Greek judoka
- Lavrenti (given name)
- Lavrentiy (given name)
- Laurentius (disambiguation)
