= Lawrence James Beck =

American sculptor (1938–1994)

Larry Beck
- Born: Lawrence James Beck; May 20, 1938; Seattle, WA
- Died: March 27, 1994 (aged 55); Seattle, WA
- Education: University of Washington
- Known for: Sculpture

Larry Beck (May 20, 1938 – March 27, 1994), full name Lawrence James Beck, was an American sculptor born in Seattle, Washington. Beck was one quarter Native Alaskan, a cause of both conflict and inspiration during his career. His work ranged from industrial assemblages and happenings in the 60's to large, abstract public commissions in the 70's to Yup'ik masks inspired by traditional Yup'ik pieces, but rendered with modern industrial and manufactured materials which he began in the 80's and was working on up until his death.

== Life ==
Beck's father was American, his mother was Norwegian/Yup'ik from Alaska. He was raised in Seattle and attended the University of Washington, earning a B.A. in painting (with a minor in art history and ceramics) in 1964 and an M.F.A. in sculpture in 1965. Among Beck's teachers at UW were George Tsutakawa and Everett Du Pen and visiting New York artist Gabriel Kohn. Beck also worked as an assistant to Mark di Suvero on a large sculpture installation for Virginia and Bagley Wright. He taught at the University of Oregon, Eugene was a Visiting Instructor of Sculpture for the 1966-67 academic year. The years 1967-68 were spent as a visiting Fine Arts Fellow at the University of Southampton, England. Returning to the Northwest, Beck moved to the Skagit Valley. The Northwest scene in the sixties included then art critic (now novelist) Tom Robbins.

== Work ==
From the time he graduated with his M.F.A., Beck made formalist, abstract, large scale sculpture in the manner of his abstract-expressionist training and began to establish his reputation as a sculptor. His earliest pieces were largely made of found metals and objects assembled in a lyrical, yet humorous manner. He was also (with Tom Robbins and others) part of the Shazam Society which produced performance and "happenings". He accumulated many awards and honors and his first Art in Public Places commission (1971), which would have placed a fountain in Pioneer Square at Occidental Park. That piece was never realized, but between 1975 and 1980 he won three other major commissions for work to be installed at Golden Gardens Park, Highline Community College (Poktalaruk 'huk shuk, 1978), and the King County International Airport.

Though raised in Seattle, away from his mother's tribal heritage, in the mid-70's, Beck visited the Alaskan coast and for the first time began to understand the spirit-filled Yup'ik culture. In 1973, Beck developed a new series of minimalist pieces that he entitled "Inukshuk" which is Inuit for sculptural presence (such as, a stone landmark). This term was also used for the three major commissions that followed. The introduction of Inuit terminology was the first sign that Beck was consciously bringing his multi-cultural heritage into his work. He experimented with casting several small masks, based on traditional Inuit forms, in aluminum and bronze, but he was still uncomfortable with the fact that the masks represented a complete contradiction to his western art training. This and peer group pressure kept him doing abstract work.

After the 1980 installation of his major commission at the King County Airport, Beck experienced what he would call his sculpture career crisis. He became disenchanted with public art. Many artists of the times were losing interest in non-objective forms—Beck was not alone in seeking subjects that spoke specifically to his existential needs. The years of research into his family history and a desire to integrate his Alaskan awareness into his art finally led to his commitment to making masks – modern interpretations of traditional Inuit spirit forms – leaving the world of large, abstract public art commissions behind.

As native Alaskan artists had gleaned inspiration and materials from the shores of Norton Sound, Beck scoured his urban environment – junkyards, hardware stores, the local five and dime – for the raw materials for his masks.

Old rearview mirrors, baby moon hubcaps, discarded whitewall tires, surplus airplane rivets, kitchen implements, even kids' toys became part of the masks that eventually brought him international acclaim. Beck used the word "Inua" in titling his masks. This is the native term for "spirit" and it was his hope that each mask was imbued with enough Inua to satisfy the spirit debt he felt was owed to his Inuit heritage. One of his masks, Punk Bear Spirit from 1984, can be seen in Washington's State Art Collection.

Papers and photos from Beck's estate are in the Archives of the National Museum of the American Indian of the Smithsonian Institution.

== Exhibitions ==
Beck's masks were shown around the U.S. and abroad in exhibitions such as "The Eloquent Object" (1987–89), a traveling show from the Philbrook Museum of Art, Tulsa, Oklahoma; the Heard Museum's 3rd Biennial (1987–88) in Phoenix, Arizona and "No Beads, No Trinkets" (1984) at the Palais des Nations, United Nations, Geneva, Switzerland, curated by Edgar Heap of Birds and in galleries in Reno, Nevada; Kansas City, Missouri; San Antonio, Texas and Philadelphia, Pennsylvania. His masks are also in collections at the Anchorage Museum at Rasmuson Center and the Smithsonian Institution National Museum of the American Indian. His early, abstract work was shown throughout the Northwest in various galleries and museums, including the Portland Art Museum; the Seattle Art Museum; "West Coast Now -- Current Art from the Western Seaboard" (1968), Seattle-Los Angeles; the Henry Gallery at the University of Washington, Seattle; and the Polly Friedlander Gallery, Seattle.

== Education ==
- 1938 Born Seattle, Washington
- 1957-58, 1959-60 University of Washington, studies in engineering
- 1960-61 Burnley School of Professional Art
- 1961-62 University of Washington
- 1962 University of Arizona Summer School at Guadalajara, Mexico
- 1962-64 University of Washington (B.A. in Painting, minor in Art History and Ceramics, 1964)
- 1964-65 University of Washington (M.F.A. in Sculpture, 1965)
- 1994 Died Seattle, Washington

== Sculptures in public collections and public spaces ==
- King County International Airport, Seattle, WA, 1980
- Highline Community College, Midway, WA, 1978: Poktalaruk 'huk shuk, 1978
- Golden Gardens Park, Seattle, WA, 1977
- U.S. Department of the Interior, Washington, D.C.
- Bellevue Art Museum, Bellevue, WA
- Calista Corporation, Anchorage, AK
- Seattle City Light, Seattle, WA
- University of Alaska Museum, Fairbanks, AK
- Anchorage Museum of History and Art, Anchorage, AK
- Smithsonian Institution National Museum of the American Indian, Washington, D.C.
