= Lawrence Filippone =

American educator (born 1954)

Lawrence Fuguet Filippone (born 1954 in Bryn Mawr, PA) is an American educator. He holds degrees from Temple University, the Smithsonian Program at George Washington University, and Dartmouth College and has pursued additional study at St. John's College, University of London and the University of Oxford. He designed a high school honors European history curriculum with Norman Crowther Hunt, and he contributed to the research for Constance M. Grief's, John Notman, Architect. After finishing his graduate degrees he joined the staff of The National Archives in Washington, DC. He has taught history at Montclair Kimberley Academy in New Jersey and The Thacher School in California. He served as Assistant Headmaster of The Hill School in Pennsylvania where he helped to usher in coeducation and an honor code before being appointed Dean of Deerfield Academy in Massachusetts. He has also held the Independence Foundation Teaching Chair at The Lawrenceville School outside of Princeton, NJ.
