= Lawrence W. Steinkraus =

United States Air Force general (1922–1992)

Lawrence William Steinkraus
- Born: November 29, 1922; Cambridge, Massachusetts
- Died: December 4, 1992 (aged 70)
- Military career
- Allegiance: United States of America
- Branch: United States Air Force
- Service years: 1942-1974
- Rank: Major General
- Commands: Deputy Director for operations of the U.S. Joint Chiefs of Staff
- Conflicts: World War II
- Awards: Distinguished Service Medal; Legion of Merit; Joint Service Commendation Medal; Air Force Commendation Medal

Lawrence William Steinkraus (November 29, 1922 – December 4, 1992) was a Major General in the U.S. Air Force. His last post was to serve as the deputy director for operations of the U.S. Joint Chiefs of Staff.

Prior to that position he served as deputy chief of staff for logistics at the Headquarters Strategic Air Command, and as Commander of the 319th Bombardment Wing, at Grand Forks Air Force Base in North Dakota.

== Education ==
- Bachelor's degree in industrial management from Florida State University.
- Graduate of the Advanced Management School at the University of Colorado.
