= Lawrence F. Feloney =

Massachusetts politician (1921–2004)

Member of the Massachusetts House of Representatives from the 3rd Middlesex district
- In office 1953–1962

Personal details
- Born: September 11, 1921 Somerville, Massachusetts, US
- Died: April 26, 2004 (aged 82) Cambridge, Massachusetts, US
- Education: Harvard College (BA); Boston University Law School (LLB)

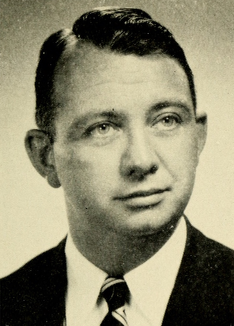
Portrait of Lawrence F. Feloney member of the Massachusetts House of Representatives

Lawrence F. Feloney (September 11, 1921 – April 26, 2004) was an American politician who was the member of the Massachusetts House of Representatives from the 3rd Middlesex district.
