= Lawrence Segawa =

Ugandan footballer (born 1984)

Personal information
- Date of birth: 10 September 1984 (age 42)
- Place of birth: Jinja, Uganda
- Position: Midfielder

Senior career*
Years	Team	Apps	(Gls)
2002–2005	Police FC Jinja		
2006–2009	Al-Merreikh		
2010	FK Srem	0	(0)
2010–2011	Police FC Jinja		
2011–2013	URA Kampala		

International career^{‡}
2005–2006	Uganda	6	(0)
- * Club domestic league appearances and goals ‡ National team caps and goals as of February 19, 2010

Lawrence Segawa (born 10 September 1984 in Jinja) is a Ugandan international footballer last playing for Uganda Revenue Authority SC.

== Career ==
He has played for Police FC before moving abroad. In 2006, he moved to Sudan where he signed with the country's giants Al-Merreikh. Next he moved to Serbia, and signed, during the winter break of the 2009–10 season, with FK Srem from Sremska Mitrovica, a club with an already established tradition of importing Ugandan footballers, and where he will join his fellow national team player Vincent Kayizi.

== External sources ==
- Lawrence Segawa at National-Football-Teams.com
- Profile at Srbijafudbal.
