= Larry Walker (race walker) =

American racewalker (born 1942)

Personal information
- Full name: Lawrence Alexander Walker
- Born: December 30, 1942 (age 83) Los Angeles, California, U.S.
- Height: 6 ft 2 in (188 cm)
- Weight: 170 lb (77 kg)

Sport
- Sport: Athletics
- Event: Racewalking

Lawrence Alexander Walker (born December 30, 1942) is an American racewalker. He competed in the men's 20 kilometres walk at the 1976 Summer Olympics. Walker also competed in Masters Track and Field competitions and held Masters Records.
