= Lawrence Walker (cricketer) =

Irish cricketer (1901–1976)

Personal information
- Born: 1901
- Died: 1976 (aged 74–75)

Lawrence Walker (1901–1976) was an international cricketer for Ireland national cricket team.
