= The Robesonian takeover =

1988 hostage-taking in North Carolina

Coordinates: 34°38′15″N 78°59′59″W

On February 1, 1988, two armed Tuscarora men, Eddie Hatcher and Timothy Jacobs, took hostages in the offices of The Robesonian newspaper in Lumberton, Robeson County, North Carolina. At the time, Robeson County was experiencing a significant level of drug trafficking and there was increasing public distrust of the county sheriff's office, especially from the area's significant Native American population. Hatcher believed he had evidence of corruption in the local justice system and, fearing for his life, enlisted the aid of Jacobs to try to raise awareness about his concerns. The two held the staff of the county daily newspaper hostage for 10 hours before extracting an agreement from North Carolina Governor James G. Martin to investigate corruption allegations in Robeson.

The event provoked a major police response and significant media attention. Residents expressed mixed feelings about the efficacy of the takeover, but some expressed sympathy for Hatcher's and Jacobs' concerns about corruption. Martin appointed a task force to field their allegations, but the two ceased cooperating with the state officials after they refused to secure their immunity from prosecution. Both men were found not guilty of federal offenses before being convicted on kidnapping charges in state court. The governor's task force ultimately found no evidence of wrongdoing in the county sheriff's office at the time.

== Background ==
=== Robeson County ===
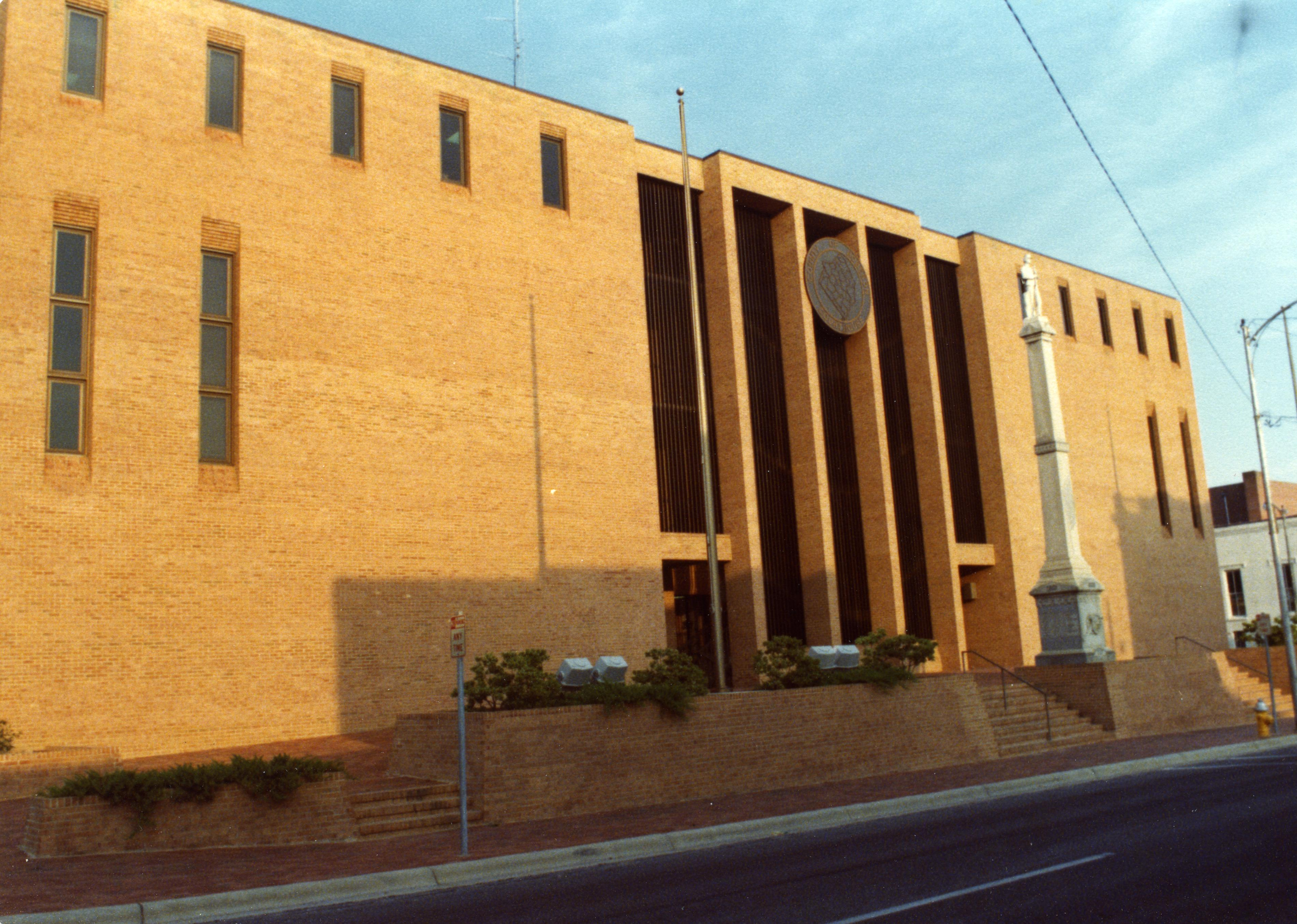
Robeson County courthouse in Lumberton, 1978

In the 1980s Robeson County was among the poorest counties in the state of North Carolina, United States. It had a triracial population of about 101,000 people of whom 26 percent were black, 37 percent were white, and 37 percent were Native American (mostly members of the Tuscarora and Lumbee tribes). (Note: Some Lumbee trace their origins to the original Tuscarora inhabitants of North Carolina. Self-identification by Indian Robesonians as Tuscarora became common in the mid-20th century who, while acknowledging kinship links with local Lumbee, felt that the more recent Lumbee label stifled attempts by Native Americans in the area to achieve full federal recognition as a sovereign tribe and preferred to use a name with more historical legitimacy. Many Tuscaroras associated with the American Indian Movement and the Red Power movement.) At the time, the county experienced a significant level of drug trafficking, becoming a distribution point for cocaine originating from Miami, Florida. The Robeson County Sheriff, Hubert Stone, worked closely with District Attorney Joe Freeman Britt to prosecute narcotics-related offenses. Public concerns of corruption among Robeson County law enforcement officials arose in August 1986, when cocaine was taken from an evidence locker in the sheriff's office. A deputy was accused of theft but was acquitted in court. Concern was levied directly at Sheriff Stone when he appeared as a character witness in a 1985 trial for a local man charged with cocaine dealing and wrote a letter asking for the release of another who had purchased large quantities of marijuana from undercover federal agents.

On November 1, 1986, Kevin Stone—a sheriff's deputy and the son of the sheriff—shot and killed Jimmy Earl Cummings, an unarmed Lumbee man, during a traffic stop. The county elections took place three days later, and Hubert Stone was reelected to his office. A jury for a coroner's inquest later ruled that the shooting was "accidental and in self-defense". Robeson County's major newspaper, The Robesonian, accused the sheriff's department of "whitewashing" the incident and said that Stone had erred in promoting his son to the position of head of the department narcotics division when he was young and inexperienced. After the affair Stone struggled to garner electoral support from the Lumbee community. That year a triracial group of Robeson residents created the Concerned Citizens for Better Government (CCBG). The group raised money for Cummings' family's legal fees and attempted to raise awareness about other police-related killings in the county. Sheriff Stone denounced the members of the CCBG as "radicals".

=== Eddie Hatcher and Timothy Jacobs ===
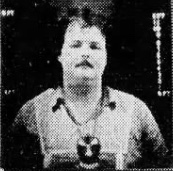
Eddie Hatcher in a contemporary wanted poster photo

Eddie Hatcher was a member of the Tuscarora tribe and the CCBG. In January 1988 he came into possession of a map from John Hunt, a drug dealer and alleged informant working for the State Bureau of Investigation. The map, drawn by Hunt or someone else, depicted various networks and personalities related to the drug trade in Robeson County, including an implication that such trafficking included the involvement of county court officials. Believing that Hunt had told the sheriff's department that he possessed the map, Hatcher began to fear that he would be arrested. He consulted an attorney who advised him that the map was not sufficient to evidence law enforcement misconduct and would be of little use to him if he was detained by the authorities. The police chief of Pembroke suggested that he drop the matter since he was likely to provoke some "dangerous people". Some CCBG members helped Hatcher leave the area for a few days, but he returned to continue investigating. That month a black asthmatic, Billy McKellar, died in the Robeson County jail after falling ill and not receiving medical attention.

Hatcher enlisted the aid of fellow Tuscarora Timothy Jacobs, who he had met through activist circles. The two decided to take the staff of a newspaper—The Robesonian—hostage to raise publicity for their concerns and protect Hatcher from anticipated retribution for his alleged insight into local drug dealing. (Note: Robesonian editor Bob Horne later said, "I had the feeling that Eddie Hatcher wanted to do the takeover and coerced Timothy Jacobs into it.") The Robesonian was Robeson County's afternoon daily newspaper. Headquartered in downtown Lumberton near the Robeson County Courthouse, it had an average circulation of 15,000. Having existed for over 100 years and representing mainstream white opinion in the county, The Robesonian regularly editorially disagreed with The Carolina Indian Voice of Pembroke, the county's younger Indian-led weekly paper. Hatcher had previously expressed dissatisfaction with the editorial direction of The Robesonian, writing in an op-ed in the Voice that it was controlled by "political trash". Hatcher and Jacobs also felt that the paper's mirrored office windows would offer them a strategic advantage in a siege, allowing them to see outside but preventing onlookers from seeing in. Hatcher wrote his will the night before the takeover, while Jacobs told his professors at Pembroke State University that he would be missing class due to an impending "emergency".

== Siege ==
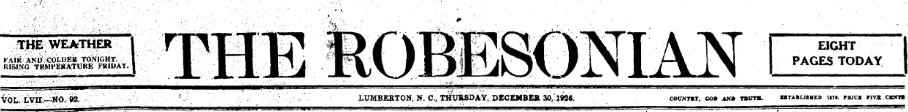
The Robesonian nameplate

At 9 a.m. on the morning of February 1, 1988, Hatcher and Jacobs purchased two shotguns and ammunition for a .38 pistol from a hardware store in Pembroke. They sawed off the shotgun barrels, and one hour later entered the offices of The Robesonian in downtown Lumberton. Upon their entrance, a receptionist panicked and offered the two money from the cash drawer. Hatcher told her, "This isn't a robbery, ma'am." Hatcher then chained the front doors of the offices shut. A total of 17 to 19 people were taken hostage, including one man who was trying to purchase an advertisement. The paper's sports editor, Donnie Douglas, fled through a back door. One reporter, Raymond Godfrey, was able to lock himself in a darkened office without being noticed. He telephoned his wife, 9-1-1, and then directly called the Lumberton Police Department, describing to the operator the men's appearance and the weapons they possessed. He later called a State Bureau of Investigation agent in Raleigh to provide officials with information on events.

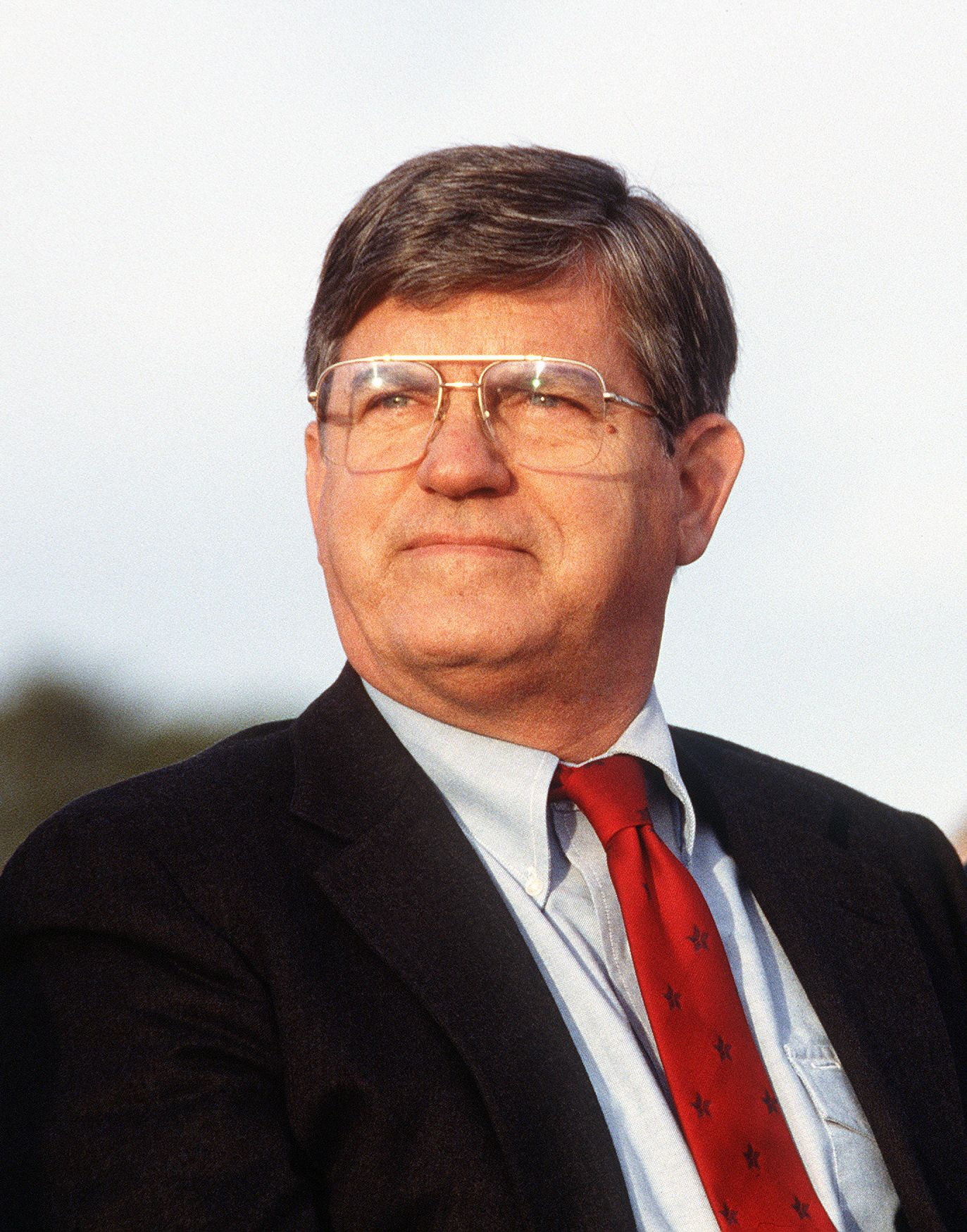
Governor James G. Martin refused demands to speak with the hostage takers

About 100 law enforcement officers responded to the hostage crisis. Police cordoned off two blocks around the newspaper offices in downtown Lumberton. As the siege progressed The Robesonian office's switchboard was flooded by calls from state, national, and international news organizations. Hatcher, Jacobs, and the staff gave numerous telephone interviews on the events as they unfolded. Jacobs told one journalist that, "The Indian people are tired of the fact that so many people are getting killed, and the lawmen are just covering it up." Hatcher suggested that the police should not intervene, saying, "It's not up to me whether these people get killed or not. Their lives rest in the hands of law enforcement officials." While the siege was ongoing, the office of U.S. Representative Charlie Rose, unaware of what was transpiring, called The Robesonian to talk about a news story. The journalist who answered the phone told the congressional office that Hatcher and Jacobs wanted to speak with Rose. After consulting with Lumberton police, Rose called back and spoke with Hatcher, who asked that a federal investigation be opened into local corruption.

Phil Kirk, who negotiated on Martin’s behalf

Hatcher and Jacobs demanded to speak directly with North Carolina Governor James G. Martin, who refused to do so for fear of setting a precedent. Instead, Martin's chief of staff, Phil Kirk, negotiated on the governor's behalf via phone from the State Highway Patrol commander's office in Raleigh. Martin remained in the office to direct the state's efforts and respond to the situation along with the patrol commander and the deputy director of the State Bureau of Investigation. Over the course of five phone calls, Kirk and the hostage takers agreed to four demands: that the death of McKellar be investigated, that potential corruption in the sheriff's department be investigated, that John Hunt be removed from the sheriff department's custody, and that Hatcher and Jacobs be allowed to surrender to the Federal Bureau of Investigation.

The siege lasted 10 hours. Halfway through, newspaper executive editor Bob Horne began taking photos of the situation. Hatcher and Jacobs released hostages as the standoff progressed until only seven were left in the building. They also negotiated with officials to give them and the hostages food and cigarettes. In preparation for their surrender, the Lumberton police chief drove around the office block three times with a bullhorn announcing that law enforcement officers were to hold their fire on the order of the governor. Horne, worried that Hatcher and Jacobs would be still shot, chose to lead them out of the building as a shield. As Hatcher and Jacobs backed towards the police, the former turned to Horne and said, "Bob, please don't do us too bad in the paper."

== Aftermath ==
=== Media coverage and reactions ===
What people think about that day depends on who you ask. Then and now, Robeson ranks among the poorest and most violent counties in the state. Did it shed a light on corruption and racism? Undoubtedly. Was it an unnecessary display of force? Probably that too.

— Journalist Sarah Nagem, 2023

The siege attracted an estimated 200 journalists to Lumberton to cover the events. It was featured that evening on CBS Evening News by an on-site reporter. At least 50 journalists from other organizations interviewed Robesonian staff the following day. Having been unable to published their February 1 Monday edition, The Robesonian put out an afternoon Tuesday edition covering the events of the siege with 3,000 additional printed copies available for circulation. The hostage crisis briefly softened the rivalry between The Robesonian and the Voice, with Voice editor Connee Brayboy pledging to mend their differences and agreeing with the former paper that Hatcher and Jacobs should not "waste away in prison." This quickly ended when Brayboy began actively campaigning and raising money for the two, leading Horne to condemn her actions as unprofessional for a journalist.

Within Robeson County, views on the siege were divided; some believed it was a necessary act to bring attention to the corruption allegations, while others thought it was dangerous and unproductive. When asked if he was surprised by the hostage-taking, Tuscarora tribe chairman Cecil Hunt said, "No. The people in this county have got to have some relief from the oppression that's been occurring over the years." The CCBG denounced the hostage-taking but expressed sympathy for the corruption allegations. Alarmed by the situation, the American Indian Movement and the National Council of Churches dispatched representatives to Robeson County to study the region's drug trade. The U.S. Department of Justice sent two officials to Robeson County to learn about its economic and social problems from community leaders.

=== Investigations into corruption allegations ===
To comply with Hatcher's and Jacobs' demands, Martin assembled a three-man task force to investigate their allegations, comprising Kirk, governor's general counsel Jim Trotter, and Secretary of Crime Control and Public Safety Joe Dean. Sheriff Stone rejected the corruption allegations lodged against his office, saying to reporters, "We run a clean department" and welcoming the state probe as an opportunity to vindicate his office. Hatcher and Jacobs met once with Martin's task force on February 8, but refused to meet with them again after the officials refused to guarantee them immunity from prosecution. According to Kirk, "nothing substantive" was discussed. Meanwhile, John Hunt refused the offer from state officials to be transferred to a different jail. At Hatcher's request, the task force met with Hunt on February 9, and forwarded information he had provided on drug dealing to a United States Attorney. The task force ultimately found no evidence of wrongdoing in the sheriff's department. Johnson Britt, who was elected Robeson County district attorney in 1994, later said of the inquiry, "I don’t want to call it a joke. I just don’t think it was very thorough."

At Martin's request, the task force investigated the death of McKellar in the Robeson County jail. Kirk dispatched Secretary of Human Resources David Flaherty, State Health Director Ron Levine, and State Medical Examiner John Butts to the county to conduct interviews and compile a report. The officials were critical of the county jailers' response to McKellar's medical condition, but concluded that they did not violate any laws.

On February 18, the North Carolina Commission of Indian Affairs released a report on Robeson County's criminal justice system. Though the report was initially conceived after the 1986 shooting of Cummings, the hostage crisis sparked public interest in the report, and 500 county residents attended its presentation in Pembroke. The report concluded that Indians were arrested and incarcerated at more frequent rates than whites, and stated that many interviewees said they lacked trust in county law enforcement. The murder of Indian judicial candidate Julian Pierce in March stoked further anger in the county.

=== Criminal proceedings ===
==== Federal trial ====
Hatcher and Jacobs were each charged by the federal government with conspiring to take hostages, taking hostages, using firearms in a crime of violence, two counts of making an illegal firearm, possession of an illegal firearm, and spreading false information about explosives. They were the first two people to be charged under the 1984 Act to Combat International Terrorism. They acquired William Kunstler and Ron Kuby as defense attorneys.

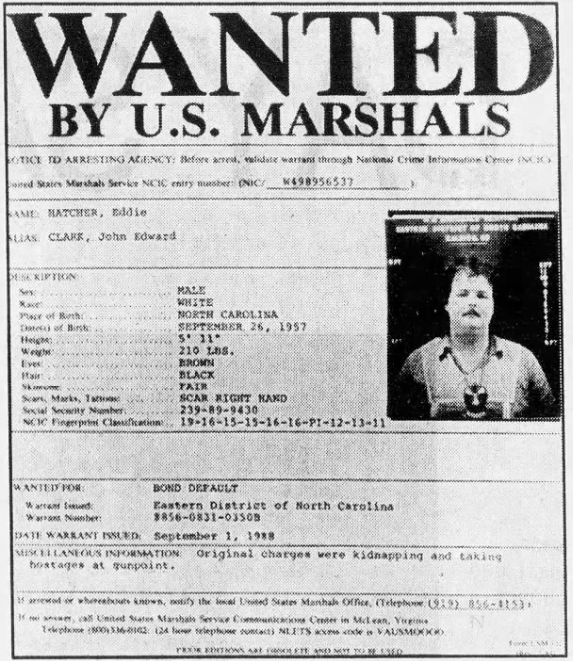
Wanted posters for Hatcher were issued by the U.S. Marshals Service following his failure to report to authorities after his bail was reconsidered.

The Robesonian initially assigned crime reporter Mike Mangiameli, who had been a hostage, to cover the federal proceedings for Hatcher and Jacobs. Unlike other Robesonian staff, Mangiameli had a generally unfavorable view of Hatcher and Jacobs. After the initial bond hearing, he told the presiding judge that if Hatcher was released he would want a pistol permit so he could defend himself. This violated federal procedure, and allowed the defense attorneys to reopen the bond hearing. The Robesonian assigned a new reporter to the case, and Mangiameli ultimately resigned, writing to the Voice that he was upset that the press was reporting "unfounded rumors and gossip" on the part of "opponents of the judicial system" and that he could "no longer be objective." Several other staffers, feeling traumatized by their experience, also left The Robesonian. Meanwhile, Brayboy gathered 4,000 signatures on a petition calling for Hatcher and Jacobs to be released.

Hatcher and Jacobs were released on bail in July to await trial. On August 30 the United States Court of Appeals for the Fourth Circuit ordered the two to return to prison while it reconsidered the bond. Jacobs surrendered himself to federal authorities the following day, while Hatcher went to Internationalist Books in Chapel Hill and asked his friend and store owner, Bob Sheldon, for help. Sheldon arranged for his friends to drive Hatcher out of state. With him failing to surrender, the U.S. Marshals Service put out a warrant for his arrest and issued wanted posters. Hatcher reached New York City and telephoned his lawyers, who advised him to return to North Carolina. He flew back to the state and surrendered himself to the authorities.

The federal trial for Hatcher and Jacobs began on September 26 after Judge Terrence Boyle refused to postpone it to allow Kunstler—who was busy working on a case elsewhere—to attend. Hatcher refused to work with two other attorneys and abstained from participating in much of the proceedings. Robesonian staff were called by the prosecution to testify about their experience. When the defense began its arguments, Boyle limited their testimony to the events of February 1 and the immediately proceeding days, thus preventing them from calling up dozens of witnesses. He also dismissed one hostage-taking charge and one firearms violation lodged against Jacobs. Throughout the trial's duration the Voice reported weekly updates which were favorable to the defendants. The Robesonian elected to instead print wire reports on the proceedings. With his lawyer absent, Hatcher delivered his own closing argument, maintaining that the takeover was necessary because his life was in danger. On October 14, the jury found Hatcher and Jacobs not guilty on all charges. The acquittal surprised and angered the staff of The Robesonian, and Horne wrote in an editorial that the verdict "thoroughly violated" the hostages' rights.

==== State proceedings ====
On his last day in office as district attorney, December 6, 1988, Britt convinced a Robeson County grand jury to indict Hatcher and Jacobs on 14 charges each of second-degree kidnapping. Jacobs fled to the Onondaga Reservation in New York. Eventually identified by local police during a traffic stop, the governor of New York ordered him to be extradited. After initially contesting the extradition, Jacobs returned to North Carolina and surrendered to authorities. He eventually pled guilty and was sentenced to six years in prison. Hatcher fled across the country to San Francisco. While there, he approached the Soviet Union's consulate to ask for political asylum. The diplomats rejected his request and he was shortly thereafter arrested and extradited back to North Carolina. He eventually pled guilty to all counts of kidnapping and was sentenced to 18 years imprisonment.

== Legacy ==
Jacobs served 14 months of his sentence and was released, eventually returning to Robeson County to engage in activism for Tuscarora-related causes. While Hatcher remained in prison, the media continued to interview him. In February 1994 Jacobs denounced Hatcher as "not the same person" he was in 1988 and criticized him for attacking the Lumbee Regional Development Association and making exaggerated claims about corruption to garner media attention. Jacobs asserted that Hatcher's words worsened race relations in the county, discouraged regional economic investment, and made it harder for him to personally find employment. After contracting HIV-AIDS, Hatcher was paroled early in May 1995. In 1999 he was arrested for shooting into a home and killing a man. While The Robesonian denounced him as "an ego-driven publicity hound," young political activists across the state viewed his arrest as a cause célèbre and saw him as a victim of political repression. Hatcher was convicted in 2001 for the murder and reincarcerated, dying in prison in 2009. Jacobs died in 2026.

The siege, combined with the murder of Julian Pierce and the 1993 murder of James R. Jordan Sr. nearby, generated a negative national image for the city of Lumberton and Robeson County as a whole. Corruption in the Robeson County Sheriff's Department was later uncovered by a state investigation begun in 2002 after Johnson Britt alerted authorities to potential wrongdoing by sheriff's deputies. The largest police corruption investigation in North Carolina's history, the operation led to 22 officers, including Sheriff Glenn Maynor, pleading guilty to a variety of charges. Some of the deputies charged had worked under Stone. Having retired in 1994, Stone maintained that under his supervision deputies did not engage in corrupt activities. Jacobs and Johnson Britt later opined that the siege created a political opening in the county which eventually led to improvements in race relations and increases in minority representation in local government. Brayboy reflected in 1993, "Looking back on it, I still believe the changes we have seen have been a direct result of it. Many, many people didn’t agree with that method. But many realized there had to be an eruption of some sort."

== Works cited ==
- Ahearn, Lorraine (2016). Narrative paths of Native American resistance: Tracing agency and commemoration in journalism texts in eastern North Carolina, 1872–1988 (PhD thesis). University of North Carolina at Chapel Hill. OCLC 1105761379.
- Graff, Michael; Ochsner, Nick (2021). The Vote Collectors: The True Story of the Scamsters, Politicians, and Preachers behind the Nation's Greatest Electoral Fraud. Chapel Hill: UNC Press Books. ISBN 9781469665573.
- Lowery, Malinda Maynor (2018). The Lumbee Indians: An American Struggle. Chapel Hill: UNC Press Books. ISBN 9781469646381.
