= Hubert Stone =

American law enforcement officer

Sheriff of Robeson County, North Carolina
- In office 1978 – December 5, 1994
- Preceded by: Malcolm McLeod
- Succeeded by: Glenn Maynor

Personal details
- Died: February 11, 2008 Lumberton, North Carolina, United States
- Party: Democratic Party

Walter Hubert Stone (died February 11, 2008) was an American law enforcement officer who served as the Sheriff of Robeson County, North Carolina, from 1978 to December 1994.

Stone was raised in Robeson County, and in 1953 became a municipal police officer. He served as police chief of Fair Bluff from 1954 to 1957, when he was hired as a county sheriff's deputy. He was promoted to the job of detective before being elected Sheriff of Robeson County in 1978. He restructured the organization of the sheriff's department, assigning sergeants and detectives to districts in the county.

During his tenure the county experience a significant level of drug trafficking, and he oversaw the doubling in size of his office's drug enforcement division and worked closely with District Attorney Joe Freeman Britt to prosecute narcotics-related offenses. As a Democrat, he became a leading figure in local politics and was often sought by candidates for his support.

Stone's tenure as sheriff was marred by allegations of corruption, namely accusations that he was involved in the narcotics trade, but he was never charged with any crimes in connection with his shrieval service. His department also oversaw the investigations of the high-profile murders of Lumbee activist Julian Pierce and James R. Jordan Sr., father of basketball player Michael Jordan. Stone decided to retire in 1994 and was succeeded by Glenn Maynor. He attempted to regain the office of sheriff in 1998 but lost to Maynor by a large margin. He died in 2008.

== Early life ==
Walter Hubert Stone was raised in McDonald, North Carolina, United States. His parents were tenant farmers, and he was one of seven children. He was educated in Rowland Public Schools and in 1949 he enlisted in the United States Army. He served until 1953, a total of three years, two months and fifteen days in army, serving with the 82nd Airborne Division in the Korean War.

Stone married Norma McCullers in 1953. They had three children. It was rumoured that he had several Native American mistresses and through them fathered some illegitimate children.

Stone was hired by the Rowland Police Department in 1953. He served as police chief of Fair Bluff from 1954 to 1957, when he was hired as a Robeson County sheriff's deputy by Sheriff Malcolm McLeod to fill a vacancy. He worked for 13 years as a uniformed officer in the sheriff's department before becoming a detective. In March 1973 Stone led a group of sheriff's deputies in dispersing a crowd of Tuscarora demonstrators at the Prospect School rallying in favor of maintaining all-Native American schools. The following year he led a four-month long investigation into drug, alcohol and firearms violations in cooperation with other agencies. This led to the largest crackdown on such violations in county history up to that point, with dozens arrested for alleged offenses.

== Shrieval career ==
=== Election and early tenure ===
Stone ran for the office of Sheriff of Robeson County in 1978 with the support of outgoing sheriff McLeod. He defeated three other candidates in the Democratic primary with 50.4 percent of the vote and faced no opposition in the general election. In his first term he restructured the organization of the sheriff's department, assigning sergeants and detectives to districts in the county. During his tenure the county experienced a significant level of drug trafficking, and Stone attributed its persistence to inadequate law enforcement resources and the county's proximity to a major smuggling corridor. Stone oversaw the doubling in size of his office's drug enforcement division and worked closely with District Attorney Joe Freeman Britt to prosecute narcotics-related offenses. A Democrat, he became a leader in local politics and was often sought by candidates for his support.

=== Corruption allegations ===
Stone's tenure as sheriff was marred by allegations of corruption, but he was never charged with any crimes in connection with his shrieval service. In particular, he was criticized for a perceived closeness to drug dealers, especially when he appeared as a character witness in a 1985 trial for a local man charged with cocaine dealing and wrote a letter asking for the release of another who had purchased large quantities of marijuana from undercover federal agents. A sheriff's deputy arrested by federal investigators for drug dealing in the 1980s testified under oath that one county dealer paid Stone $300 in a protection racket for every one ounce (28 g) of cocaine he sold. Law enforcement officials never took action against Stone based on this claim. Stone rejected the allegations of his involvement in the drug trade, saying in 1994 that, "Accusations have been made against law enforcement ever since I've been here. I've been used to that."

Robeson County had a triracial population of whites, blacks, and Native Americans—including Lumbee and Tuscarora. Stone continued his predecessor's practice of hiring blacks and Native Americans as deputies and initially maintained a large degree of respect among the Native American community. On November 1, 1986, Kevin Stone—a sheriff's deputy and the son of Hubert Stone—shot and killed Jimmy Earl Cummings, an unarmed Lumbee man. The county elections took place three days later, and Hubert Stone was reelected to his office. A jury for a coroner's inquest later ruled that the shooting was "accidental and in self-defense." Robeson County's major newspaper, The Robesonian, accused the sheriff's department of "whitewashing" the incident and said that Stone had erred in promoting his son to the position of head of the department narcotics division when he was young and inexperienced. After the affair Stone struggled to garner electoral support from the Lumbee community. Connee Brayboy, editor of The Carolina Indian Voice, wrote that the sheriff was corrupt and incompetent. The Robesonian printed numerous letters complaining about unfair law enforcement, but withheld publishing others supportive of county officials as they were submitted anonymously. Stone and Britt complained about this discrepancy, but the paper's editor argued that the two must have written or solicited the letters supportive of them, as otherwise they would have likely been unaware of their existence.

On February 1, 1988, two Tuscarora men took hostages in the offices of The Robesonian in Lumberton in an attempt to bring attention to the death of a black man in the Robeson County jail and allegations of corruption in the sheriff's department—namely that sheriff's deputies were involved smuggling cocaine. They surrendered after state authorities agreed to launch an inquiry into the allegations. In the event's aftermath, The Carolina Indian Voice wrote that blacks and Native Americans faced discriminatory treatment from Robeson County law enforcement officers and called for Stone's resignation, accusing him of attempting to "sucker" Lumbees into believing that he was "pro-Indian". The subsequent state investigation found no evidence of malfeasance in the sheriff's department.

=== Murder of Julian Pierce ===
In early 1988 Lumbee attorney and activist Julian Pierce campaigned for a new Superior Court Judgeship in Robeson County. Britt also sought the office. Peirce stated that as judge he would investigate allegations that Stone was engaged in a protection racket with drug dealers. Stone tried to convince Pierce to drop out of the contest. He said in a 1989 interview, "I approached him and asked him not to run for Superior Court Judge, and asked him to run for [a lesser office]. I said, 'Joe Freeman Britt is going to run, and I'd rather not have a fight in an election over it.'" Pierce refused, and over the course of February and March it was alleged that Stone attempted to employ bribery and blackmail against Pierce. Pierce's campaign workers feared for his safety. At a political dinner on March 24, 1988, Stone took Pierce aside to discuss the campaign. According to Stone, "[Pierce] said, 'I know you and Joe [Freeman Britt] are working on me.' And I said, 'I’m not going to hurt you.'" Pierce was found shot dead in his home on the morning of March 26.

Police, including state investigators and Stone, came to Pierce's home to investigate the murder. A crowd of approximately 200 Lumbee gathered at the scene, and he asked for their help in providing information about the killing. He also told a reporter that the killing appeared to be a political assassination. A few days later he announced that investigators had concluded that Pierce was killed by Johnny Goins with the assistance of Sandy Chavis. According to Stone, Goins shot Pierce because Pierce's girlfriend had told Goins to stay away from her daughter whom Goins had previously dated. Goins' blood and fingerprints were found at Pierce's home. Chavis was arrested and charged with murder, while Goins was found dead from an apparently self-inflicted shotgun wound to the head in his father's house. Investigators quickly declared Goins' death a suicide, and Stone said he had probably killed himself to avoid being arrested, re-iterating that Pierce's murder was due to a personal dispute and not political.

Pierce's family and many members of the Lumbee community doubted investigators' conclusions. Pierce's briefcase, which had reportedly contained documents corroborating corruption claims in county government, had gone missing, as had the sheriff's office dispatch tapes from the night of March 25/26. Goins' autopsy mentioned that he had written a confessional suicide note, but law enforcement officials never produced it. A bloody footprint found in Pierce's house did not match Goins or Chavis. As for Goins, the state medical examiner and state investigators disagreed on whether he shot himself through the mouth or the side of the head. No gunshot residue was found on his hands, and the autopsy did not conclude that he had fired the gun himself. A crime scene photo also showed that the shotgun which had killed Goins sitting in his lap with its breech open. When asked about this in 1989, Stone maintained that the shotgun was found with its breech closed. When asked if he thought Goins killed Pierce, Stone refused to comment, citing Chavis' impending trial. In 1990 Chavis' murder trial was canceled after key witnesses for the prosecution refused to testify, and Chavis entered an Alford plea to accessory to murder after the fact. Circumstances surrounding the murder of Pierce remain contested, and members of his family and elected officials have in the years since his death questioned the investigation.

=== Murder of James Jordan ===
In 1990 Stone was challenged in the Democratic primary by Glenn Maynor, a Lumbee. He defeated Maynor in a run-off and defeated Republican James Sanderson in the general election. In late July 1993, James R. Jordan Sr., father of basketball player Michael Jordan, disappeared. On August 3 a body was found with a bullet wound in a swamp in South Carolina by a fisherman, and a few days later his car was discovered in Fayetteville. The body was identified as Jordan's a week later. North Carolina state investigators and the Robeson County Sheriff's Department concluded that Jordan was shot early in the morning on July 23 while trying to sleep at a pull-off aside U.S. Route 74 in Robeson County. Police arrested two young men—Larry Demery and Daniel Green—for the murder, using evidence collected from the car and the automobile phone's records, as well as a video of the two men wearing Jordan's affects, including a National Basketball Association championship ring gifted to him by his son. Stone theorized that the two men had planned to rob Jordan but decided to kill him instead. Some county residents were skeptical of the story; Brayboy said of the place where Jordan was murdered, "They move drugs there all the time. James Jordan was either a part of what goes on in this county or he runned up something in that particular location that he was not to see, and live." Demery and Green were convicted of murder in 1996. In 2015 Green sought a new trial, and in court filings his lawyers accused the North Carolina State Bureau of Investigation of withholding evidence; one of the calls in Jordan's car's phone records was placed to Hubert Larry Deese, a cocaine dealer and Stone's illegitimate son. Deese was also a coworker of Demery at a factory near where Jordan's body was recovered. Green's lawyers suggested that Stone had moved the investigation away from Deese to protect him and avoid a narcotics investigation. Deese denied having any connection with Demery or the murder.

=== Later career and retirement ===
In a 1994 GQ interview Stone was quoted as saying, "Anytime you look down the street and you see a black and an Indian guy, you've got crime. You know you're not supposed to look at things like that, but that's the way it is." He later denied saying this, telling The News & Observer that he never had "any racial thoughts in my mind whatsoever". He decided not to run for reelection in 1994 and reportedly favored detective Lum Edwards to succeed him. Edwards was defeated by Maynor in the Democratic primary and Stone was succeeded by Maynor on December 5. He then applied to become a deputy U.S. Marshal, being nominated by U.S. Representative Charlie Rose for the position of supervisor in the Eastern District of North Carolina. The incumbent U.S. Marshal for the Eastern District thought he would bring a "black cloud" over the office and he was passed over for the appointment. Stone attempted to regain the office of sheriff in 1998 but was defeated by Maynor by a large margin. He nevertheless remained active in local politics after his retirement.

Corruption was later uncovered by a state investigation into the Robeson County Sheriff's Department in the 2000s. The largest police corruption investigation in North Carolina's history, the operation led to 22 officers, including Sheriff Maynor, pleading guilty to a variety of charges. Some of the deputies charged had worked under Stone. He maintained "When I left I don't believe anyone could say they were not real clean, straightforward guys. With no supervision, over time they just changed."

== Later life ==
Stone's first wife died in 1974. He subsequently married Ruth McCormick, but they later divorced. In 1984 he married Eloise Day. Stone died at the age of 78 on February 11, 2008, at Southeastern Hospice House in Lumberton.

== Works cited ==
- Ahearn, Lorraine (2016). Narrative paths of Native American resistance: Tracing agency and commemoration in journalism texts in eastern North Carolina, 1872–1988 (PhD thesis). University of North Carolina at Chapel Hill. OCLC 1105761379.
- Lowery, Malinda Maynor (2018). The Lumbee Indians: An American Struggle. Chapel Hill: UNC Press Books. ISBN 9781469646381.
- Toth, Jennifer (1997). Orphans of the Living: Stories of America's Children in Foster Care (reprint ed.). Simon & Schuster. ISBN 9780684800974.
