= Battle of Hayes Pond =

1958 KKK–Lumbee armed confrontation

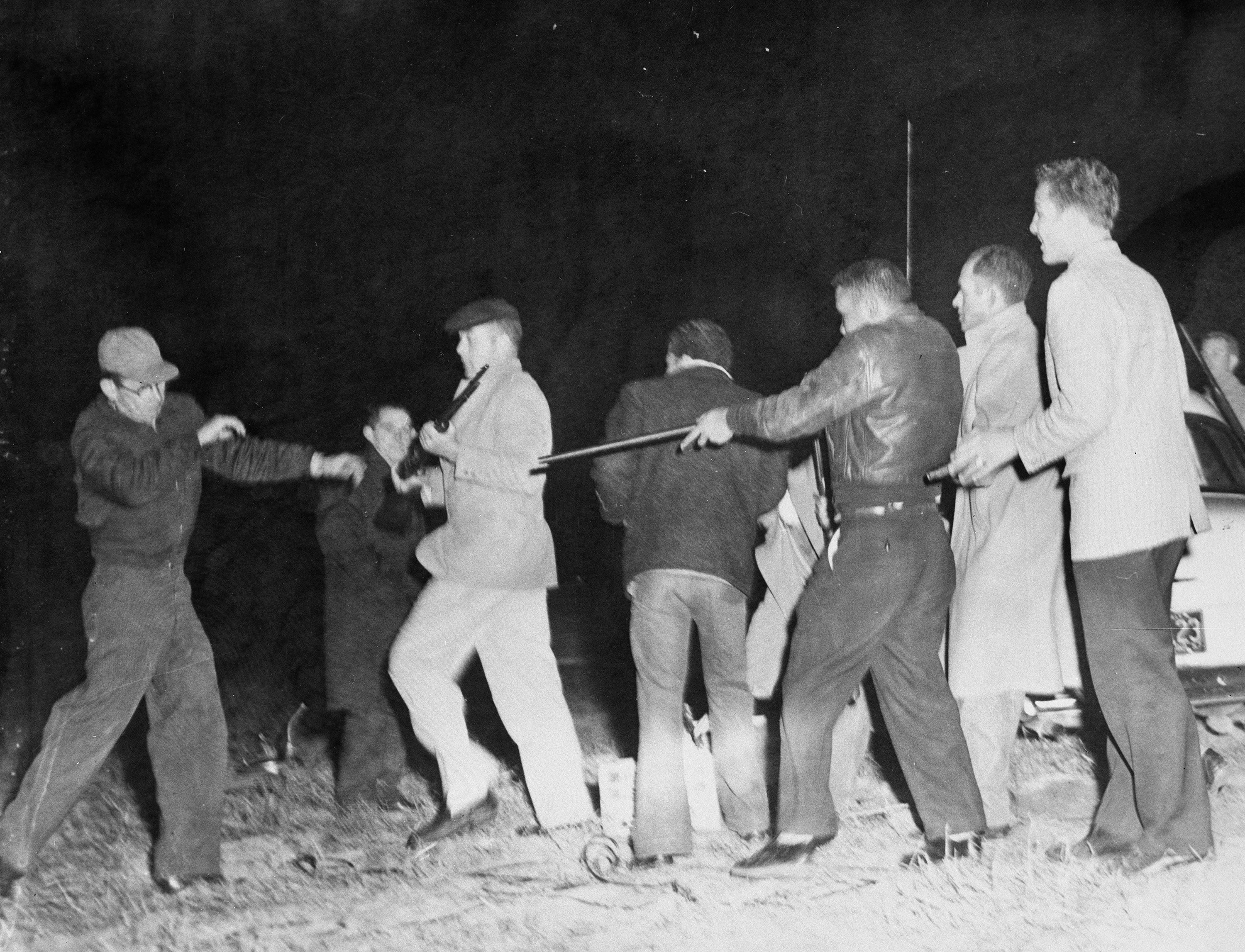
- Lumbee Indians fighting Ku Klux Klansmen during the incident
- Date: January 18, 1958
- Location: Near Maxton, North Carolina, United States; 34°43′10″N 79°21′46″W
- Caused by: Klan cross burnings and racist threats against the Lumbee community
- Result: Klan rally disrupted

Parties
North Carolina Knights	Lumbee civilians	Robeson County Sheriff's Office; North Carolina State Highway Patrol

Lead figures
James W. Cole		Malcolm McLeod; Raymond Williams

Number
~50 Klansmen	300–500 Lumbees	16 sheriff's deputies 12 highway patrolmen

Casualties
- Injuries: 4 Klansmen injured by gunfire; 3 journalists and 1 witness injured
- Arrested: 1 Klansman arrested by police
- Location within North Carolina

The Battle of Hayes Pond, also known as the Battle of Maxton Field or the Maxton Riot, was an armed confrontation between members of a Ku Klux Klan (KKK) organization and Lumbee people at a Klan rally near Maxton, North Carolina, United States, on the night of January 18, 1958. The clash resulted in the disruption of the rally and a significant amount of media coverage praising the Lumbees and condemning the Klansmen.

In 1956, James W. "Catfish" Cole, a KKK member from South Carolina, established the North Carolina Knights, a Klan organization aimed at defending racial segregation. In early 1958, Cole focused his efforts on upholding segregation in Robeson County, North Carolina, which had a triracial population of Native Americans, whites, and blacks. Many of the Native Americans were members of the recently recognized Lumbee Tribe, a group having its origins in other Indigenous peoples but which had grown into a single community around the county. Cole oversaw two cross burnings meant to frighten the Lumbees from racial mixing, and scheduled a Klan rally which he hoped would have a large turnout.

Cole and his Klansmen widely advertised their event, driving throughout the county in a truck outfitted with a loudspeaker to broadcast their plans. The announcements infuriated the Lumbee community and some decided to try to disrupt the meeting. Fearing violence, local law enforcement officials pleaded with Cole to suspend his plans, but he refused. On January 18, 1958, Cole and about 50 Klansmen, most of whom were followers of his from South Carolina, gathered in a leased cornfield near Hayes Pond, a place adjacent to the town of Maxton. Several hundred Lumbees, many armed, arrived and encircled the group and jeered at them. After an altercation in which the single light in the field was destroyed, the Lumbees began firing their weapons and most of the Klansmen fled. Cole hid in a swamp while the Lumbees seized Klan regalia and carried them to Pembroke to celebrate. Police restored order on the field and arrested one Klansman.

Afterwards, Cole and the arrested Klansman were indicted and convicted for inciting a riot. The event was widely covered in the local and national press, which blamed the Klan for the disorder and praised the Lumbees for their actions. Cole never organized another public rally in Robeson County after the incident. In 2011, the Lumbee Tribal Council declared January 18 a "Tribal Day of Historical Recognition".

== Background ==
=== Robeson County and the Lumbee Tribe ===
The Lumbee people in southeastern North Carolina originated from various Native American groups which were greatly affected by conflicts and infectious diseases dating back to the period of European colonization. Those who survived these disruptions grouped together as a homogeneous community. Culturally, this group was not particularly distinct from proximate European Americans; they were mostly agrarian, and shared similar styles of dress, homes, and music. They also spoke English and were mostly Protestants. Their identity was rooted in kinship and shared location. Through intermarriage, they acquired some white and black ancestry. In 1830, the United States government began a policy of Indian removal, forcibly relocating traditional-living, "tribal" Native American populations in the American South further west. Native Americans in Robeson County, North Carolina, owing to their assimilation into Euro-American culture, were not subject to removal. However, from this point on they were increasingly subject to racial discrimination.

In 1835, the Constitution of North Carolina classified the eastern Carolina Native Americans as "free persons of color". Under this system they were denied the right to vote, bear arms, or attend white schools. During the American Civil War, the Confederate States Army conscripted them for labor, though some resisted, leading to the Lowry War. In 1885, following Native Americans' refusal to attend black schools, the state of North Carolina recognized this group as Croatans and established a separate school system for them. This tripartite segregation was unique in the American South, though whites generally regarded both the Native Americans and blacks as "colored". Some other county facilities were separated for "Whites", "Negroes", and "Indians". In 1913, the North Carolina General Assembly reclassified the Indians as Cherokees.

Hundreds of Native Americans from Robeson County fought for the United States during World War II in white units (blacks were segregated into different outfits). Many returned with a willingness to pursue social change. Some of them, especially the war veterans, disliked Robeson County's segregation. Other leaders lobbied for the adoption of a unique name to identify their group. In the early 1950s, some led by minister D. F. Lowry formed an organization, the Lumbee Brotherhood, to unite the community. The chosen name, "Lumbee", was derived from the Lumber River, which ran through Robeson County. Lowry and his supporters argued that this was a suitable label, since the community had its origins in various indigenous groups but all resided near the river. In 1952 the name Lumbee was approved by the Native Americans in a referendum, and the following year the General Assembly formally recognized the label. In 1956, the United States Congress formally extended partial recognition to the Lumbee Tribe, affirming their existence as an indigenous community but disallowing them from use of federal funds and services available to other Native American groups. By 1958 Robeson County had a triracial population consisting of approximately 40,000 whites, 30,000 Native Americans (including Lumbees and Tuscaroras), and 20,000 blacks.

=== Ku Klux Klan activity ===
In 1954, the United States Supreme Court issued its decision in Brown v. Board of Education, ruling that racial segregation in public schools was unconstitutional. The ruling sparked a significant amount of pro-segregation activity among whites in the South, who formed various groups to oppose integration. It also led to a resurgence in Ku Klux Klan (KKK) activity. The Klan was a white supremacist and nativist movement which sought to defend racial segregation. It had different formal organizational incarnations, but all groups generally espoused white supremacy and a commitment to Protestant Christianity. The KKK was historically violent, and by the 1950s Klan violence was looked down upon by North Carolina officials. There had been a Klan presence in Robeson County in the early part of the decade before it was forced out under pressure from District Solicitor Malcolm Buie Seawell and the federal government.

In 1956, James W. "Catfish" Cole, a former member of the U.S. Klans, organized a new Klan chapter called the North Carolina Knights. With Cole leading them as their "Grand Wizard", they held their first rally in the small Robeson County community of Shannon, where Cole defended segregation. He was able to use segregationist rhetoric to grow his following throughout the following year. He also began promoting the Klan in the town of Monroe in Union County, where black civil rights activists were seeking to end segregation in public facilities. In October 1957 Cole's group attacked a National Association for the Advancement of Colored People member's house in the town, but were repelled by gunfire from armed black activists led by Robert F. Williams. In early 1958, Cole refocused his efforts on upholding segregation in Robeson County. He hoped to use this campaign to shore up support for his organization.

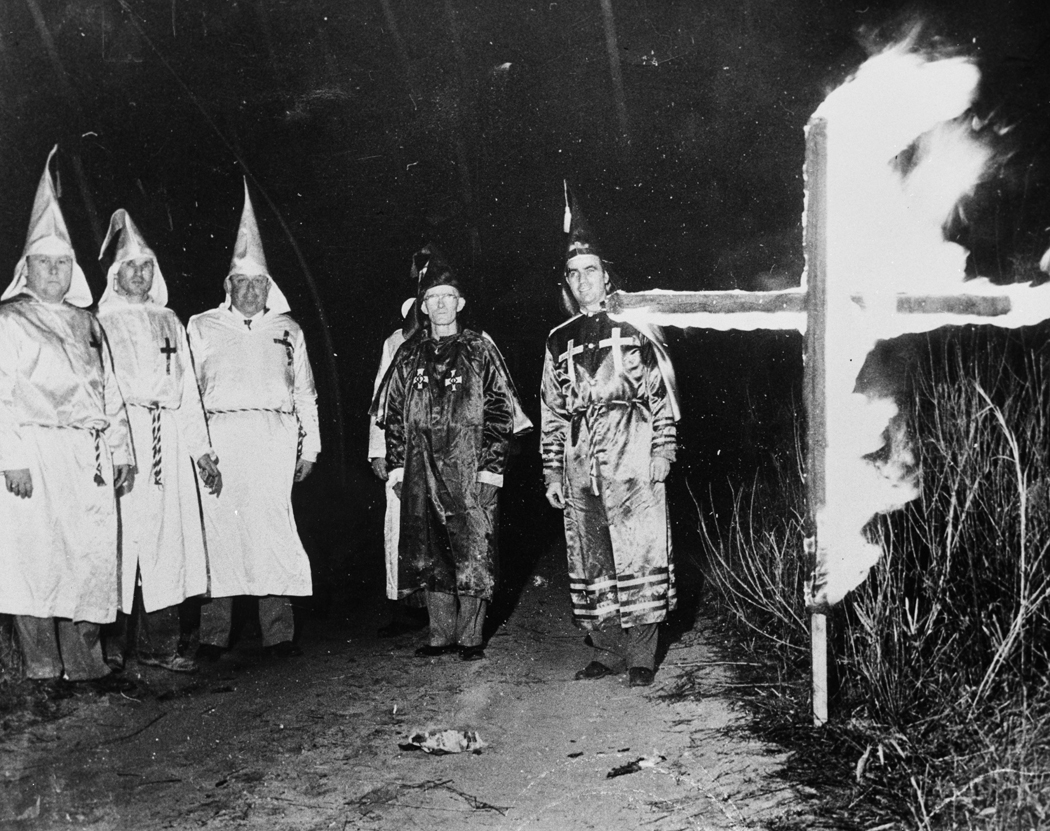
Klansmen in robes with burning cross. This photo was probably taken on January 13, 1958, in either St. Pauls or Lumberton.

On January 13, 1958, Cole and several Klansmen invited local journalist Bruce Roberts to cover their itinerary for the evening in Robeson. In St. Pauls, they burned a cross near the home of a Native American woman who was dating a white man. (Note: According to historian Malinda Maynor Lowery, the cross was burned near the home of a white woman who was dating a Native American man.) They also burned a cross in Lumberton, near the home of an Indian family that had recently moved into a white neighborhood. Cole informed Roberts that he was planning a large Klan rally the following Saturday night somewhere in or near the town of Pembroke, the center of Robeson's Lumbee community, where he would condemn the "mongrelization" of the races.

Roberts reported on the events and the planned rally in the January 14 edition of the Scottish Chief, the newspaper of the small town of Maxton. Nearby publications quickly repeated the story. Cole hoped the rally would attract hundreds or thousands of Klansmen. Rumors circulated that Robeson gun stores were selling large quantities of ammunition on Tuesday, raising fears of a violent confrontation. One Klansman went into the offices of the Scottish Chief and the Lumberton Post to ask them to advertise the rally. They also posted fliers to display their intentions. To further publicize the event, Cole and other Klansmen drove throughout the county in a truck outfitted with a loudspeaker, broadcasting their plans. The loudspeaker announcements infuriated the Lumbee community.

Fearing violence, Robeson County Sheriff Malcolm McLeod went to Cole's home in South Carolina and pleaded with him to suspend the rally, but Cole refused, telling him, "It sounds like you don't know how to handle your people. We're going to come show you." Unable to find someone willing to lease him land in Pembroke, Cole rented a small cornfield from a white farmer who lived near Hayes Pond. Hayes Pond was a former mill pond located along Big Shoe Heel Creek, south of Maxton, approximately 10 miles (16 km) from Pembroke. Maxton Chief of Police Bob Fisher, who was opposed to the Klan's presence, sent letters to state and federal authorities to ask for their assistance, while the town board of commissioners passed a resolution condemning the Klan and denouncing the rally.

At a barbershop in Pembroke, a group of Lumbee men met and suggested confronting the Klansmen in Maxton so that they would not disturb their town. (Note: Unlike Pembroke, Maxton had few Lumbee residents and it was not regarded as an "Indian place".) Other Lumbees discussed the situation in the local Veterans of Foreign Wars Hall. Accounts of how organized the Lumbees were in their response vary. In the 1960s anthropologist Karen Blu interviewed several Lumbee participants, and none mentioned the names of any leaders in this effort. She wrote that "one man" who was cited as a leader by the press was frequently criticized by her respondents for apparently professing that role. According to local activist Willa Robinson, black people who worked in the same businesses with Klansmen and were familiar with the KKK gave the Lumbees intelligence about the meeting. National news organizations such as the Associated Press, United Press International, and the International News Syndicate crafted reports printed in North Carolina and across the country which spoke of potential violence at the rally.

== Confrontation ==
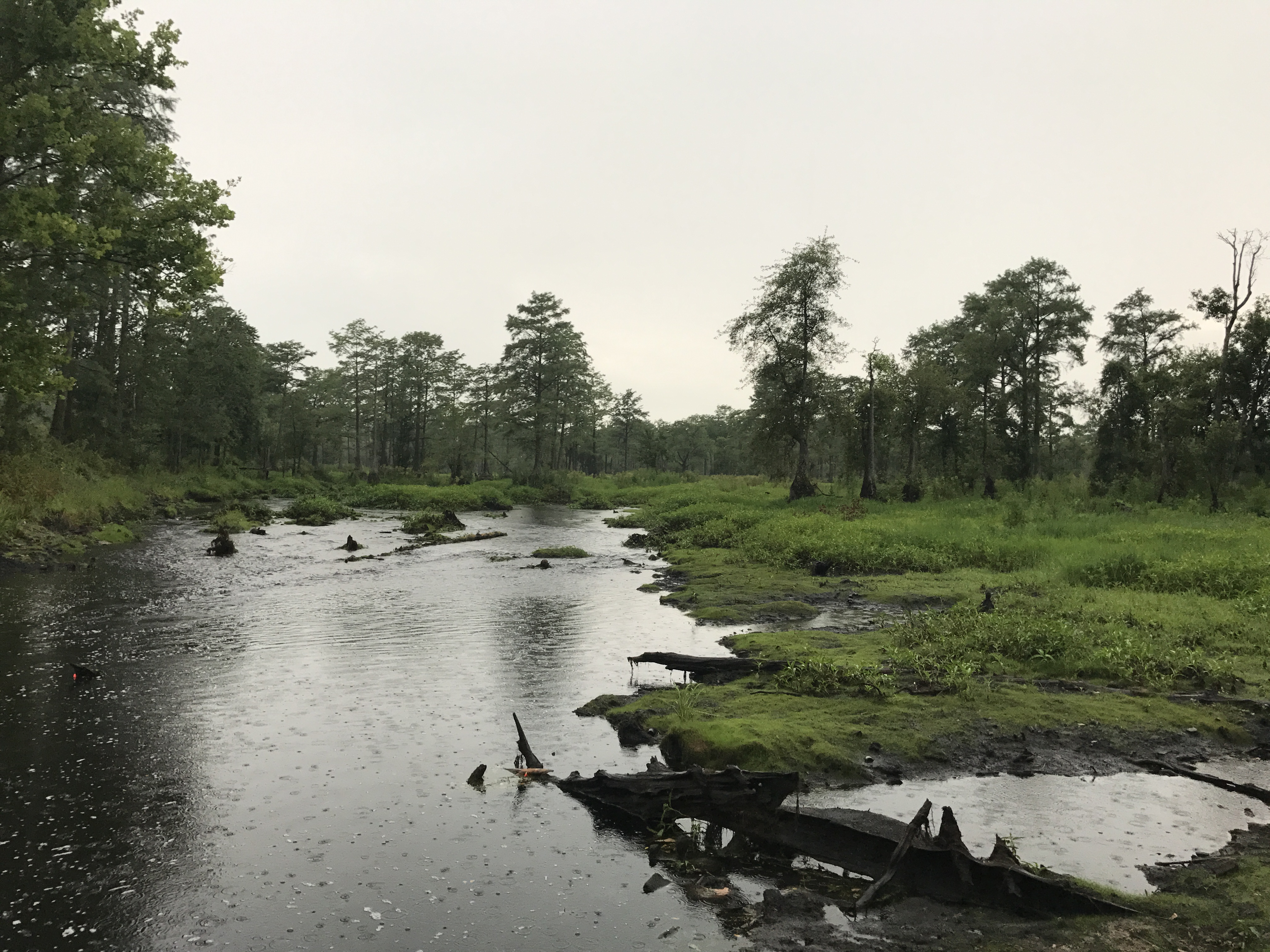
Hayes Pond, the location of the confrontation, in 2019

Cole scheduled the rally to begin at 8:30 p.m. on January 18, telling his followers to expect a crowd of at least 500 supporters. At about 7 p.m. around 10 Klansmen drove up and parked in the middle of the field. They exited their vehicles carrying guns; one was wearing Klan robes. They were confident, and one of them told a reporter from The News and Observer, "You'd better be careful. We'd hate to shoot the wrong man." Numerous local and state newspaper journalists were present, as were photographers and some radio and television broadcast reporters, including personnel from WTSB-Lumberton. The Klansmen set up a light pole and a public address system both wired to a portable generator, a banner emblazoned with the letters "KKK", and a cross which they planned to burn. Sheriff McLeod arrived with 16 deputies to maintain order. He told them that if Lumbees attacked the Klan they should "take [their] time" in breaking up a clash. A further dozen North Carolina State Highway Patrol officers under Captain Raymond Williams, some armed with submachine guns, waited about a mile down the road out of sight, ready to mobilize in case of violence.

Over the course of the next hour, more Klansmen drove into the field to join those already present. Some of them brought their wives and children, though they remained in their cars to keep warm. Most of them were from South Carolina, and few, if any, were from Robeson County. At the same time, cars carrying three to six Lumbees each began parking along the side of the road. They remained in their vehicles to stay warm. By 8 p.m. the Klansmen, numbering about 50, realized they were outnumbered and grew anxious. Cole rehearsed his speech—which condemned racial integration—while the public address system played Christian hymns. At about 8:15 p.m., the Lumbees exited their vehicles and began streaming towards the field. Historian Christopher Oakley estimated that 300–400 Lumbees were present, most of them men. Historian Malinda Maynor Lowery listed the presence of 500 Lumbee men—many of them World War II veterans—and 50 women. Some accounts recall 1,000 Native Americans present. Many of the men were armed with rifles, shotguns, pistols, and knives. As the Lumbees drew closer they began to jeer the Klan, shouting "We want Cole!" and "God damn the KKK!" The Klansmen responded by calling the Lumbees "half-niggers". McLeod pulled Cole aside and said, "Well, you know how it is. I can't control the crowd with the few men I've got. I'm not telling you to not hold a meeting, but you see how it is." According to The News and Observer reporter Charles Craven, Cole told the sheriff, "I want to get my wife and babies out...Somebody's going for them...My little babies."

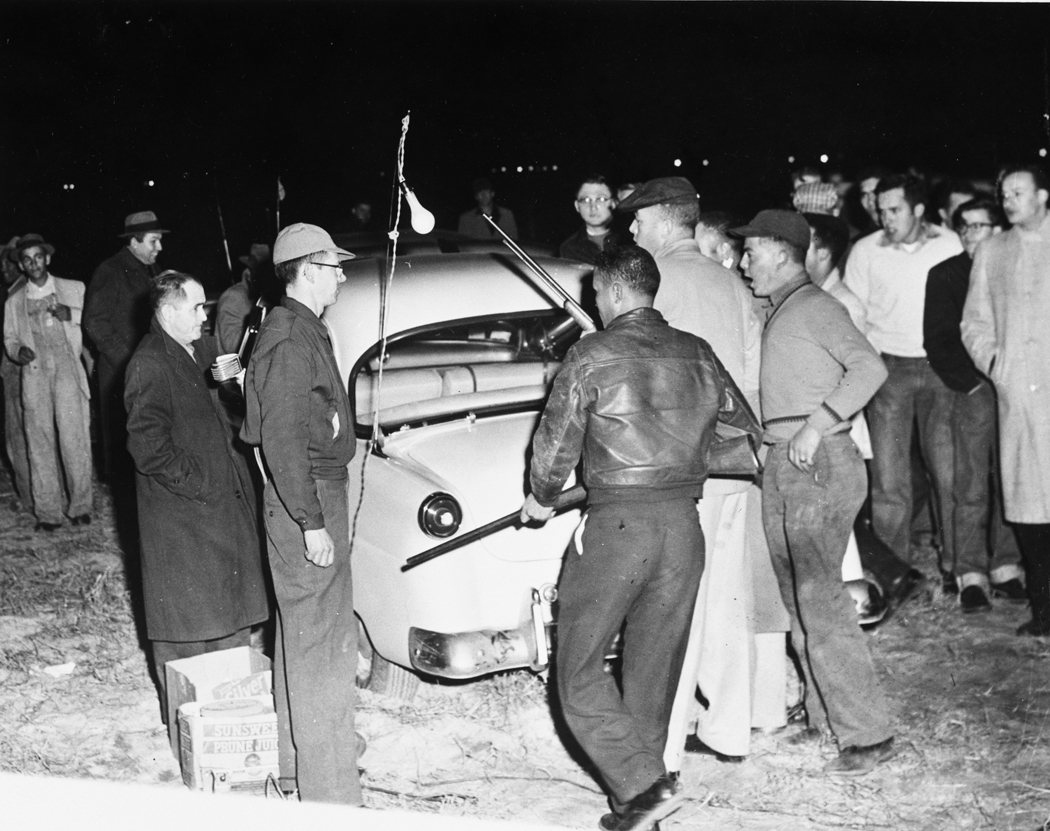
Lumbees confronting Klansmen around the light pole

Cole refused to suspend the meeting, and by 8:25 most of the Klansmen and Lumbee had circled around the light pole. Sources disagree on how the physical confrontation started. According to Oakley, shortly before 8:30 two young Lumbee men ran forward, smashed the light pole, and shut off the public address system. This plunged the field into darkness and led to a momentary silence. According to Sanford Locklear, he and his brother-in-law, Neil Lowry, approached Cole and asked him why he was there. Cole said, "We come to talk to these people," to which Locklear responded, "Well, you're ain't gone [sic] talk to these people tonight." Cole reaffirmed his intention to speak, which Locklear again rejected. Locklear then pushed Cole with his rifle and said, "And don't you move. If you do, well, I'll kill you." Lowry then shot out the light on the pole, and Locklear kicked the public address system. Initial newspaper reports of the affair stated that one Lumbee smashed the light with the butt of his shotgun, and this version corresponded to media photographs. Newsweek was the first publication to report that the light had been shot out.

The Lumbee then began firing their guns—mostly into the air—and shouting. Some fired at the tires of the Klansmen's cars. News photographers then began taking photos of the ensuing commotion. Cole quickly retreated into the nearby swamp, leaving his wife, Carolyn, and his three children behind. According to Oakley, most of the Klansmen did the same, while Lowery wrote that many of them got in their cars and drove away erratically in an attempt to escape, some crashing into ditches. Carolyn got her car stuck in a ditch; Lumbee oral tradition maintains that they had to help her push her car out, while Craven recalled seeing her run away with her three children as several Lumbee men jokingly "pretended" to free her car from the rut.

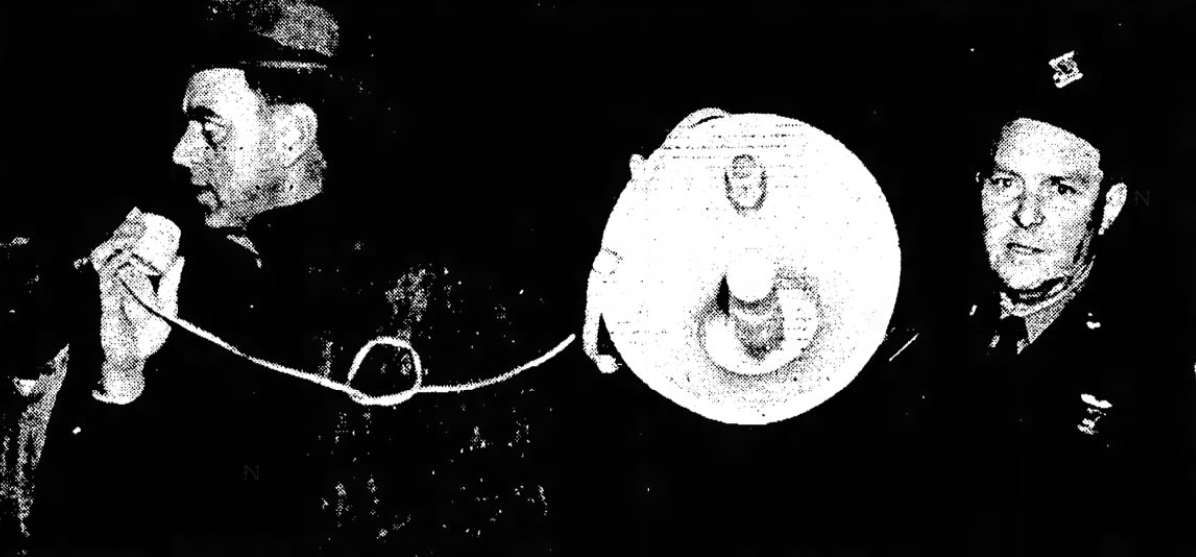
Sheriff Malcolm McLeod (left) and Captain Raymond Williams (right) urging the crowd to disperse

Robeson County sheriff's deputies then fired two tear gas grenades in an attempt to disperse the crowd. Several minutes later Williams led the highway patrol officers onto the field and restored order. McLeod announced over loudspeaker that there was still time to go home and watch Gunsmoke on television. He also found Klansmen hiding in the brush and directed them out of the area. By 9 p.m., the wind had dissipated the tear gas and the crowd had been cleared. The police confiscated two trunkloads of firearms from the Lumbees and Klansmen. James Garland Martin, a Klansman who served as Cole's sergeant-at-arms, was found by deputies lying in a ditch and subsequently arrested for public drunkenness and carrying a concealed weapon. (Note: Martin maintained that he was not drunk and only disorientated due to tear gas.) Cole remained in hiding for two days. Four Klansmen received minor gunshot wounds during the affair. Three reporters were also injured, as was a Lakota U.S. Army soldier who had traveled from Fort Bragg to witness the events.

After the shooting stopped, several Lumbees spoke with the press and posed for photographs. Some took the Klan's public address system and their cross. Simeon Oxendine, a World War II veteran and the son of Pembroke's mayor, and Charlie Warriax, stole the KKK banner. Later that night Lumbees celebrated in Pembroke, driving in a motorcade and marching through the streets before gathering in front of the police station in Pembroke to hang and burn an effigy of Cole. Oxendine and Warriax drove to the city of Charlotte with the KKK banner and entered the offices of The Charlotte Observer shortly after midnight. They gave an interview with the reporter on duty and posed with the banner in the photography studio. One picture from the shoot of Oxendine and Warriax wrapped in the banner was sent to other newspapers over the Associated Press wire and published a week later on a full page spread in Life.

== Aftermath ==
=== Reactions ===
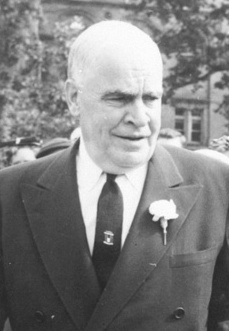
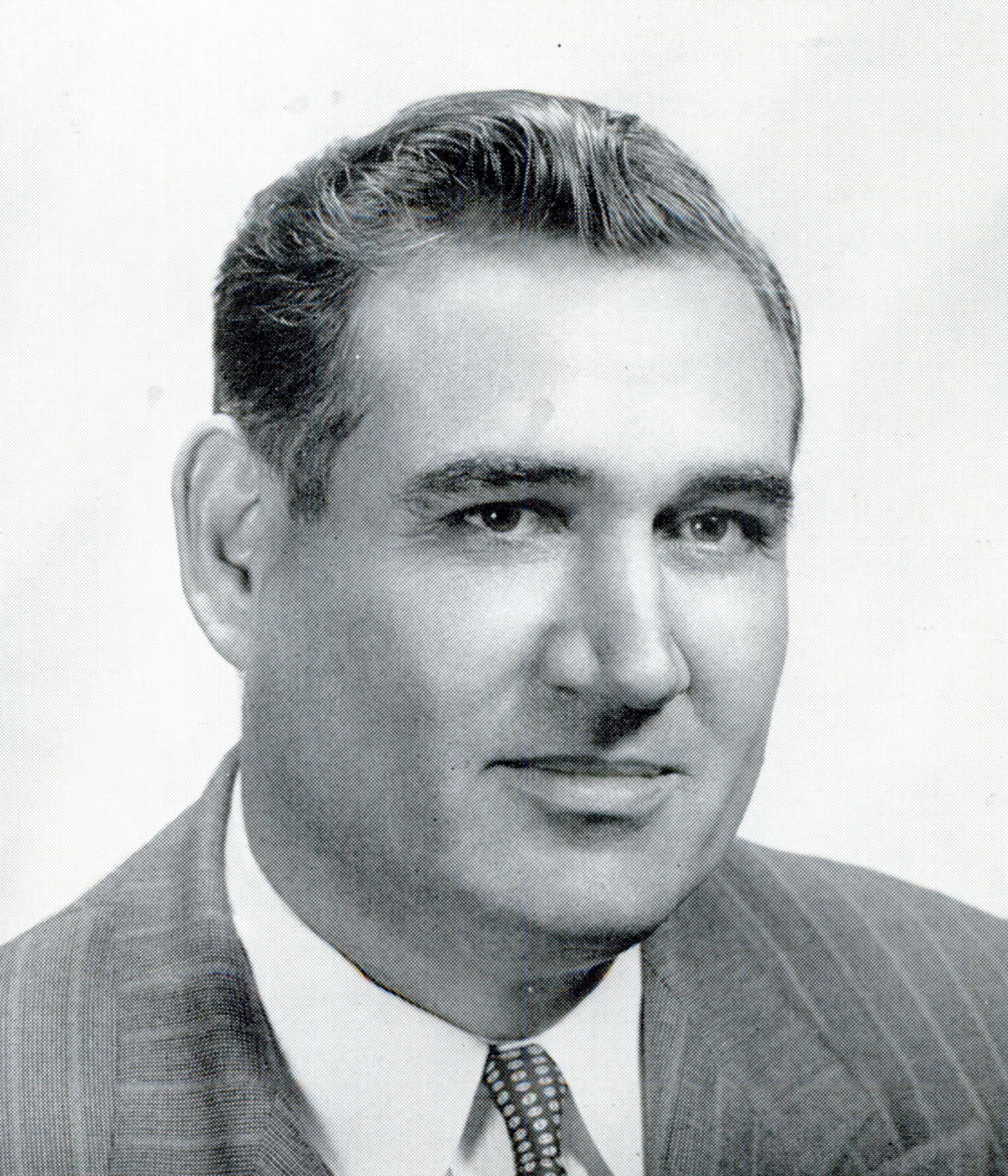
North Carolina Governor Luther H. Hodges (left) condemned the actions of the Ku Klux Klan, and Alabama Governor Jim Folsom (right) issued a statement praising the Lumbees.

The local black community was pleased with the results of the clash, while the white community was relieved. North Carolina Governor Luther H. Hodges responded to the incident by calling Sheriff McLeod and Pembroke Mayor J. C. Oxendine to assure them of his help if the situation required it. He then released a statement to the public, condemning the Ku Klux Klan as a violent group and stating that responsibility for the disorder "rests squarely" on Klan leaders. Other white observers—both locally and nationally—had mixed feelings about responsibility, expressing sympathy for the Lumbees' actions but suggesting that Cole's First Amendment rights may have been violated. Mayor Oxendine received telegrams, letters, and phone calls of approval from Native and non-indigenous Americans from around the United States. Alabama Governor Jim Folsom issued a statement reading, "The white man has mistreated the Indian for 400 years. This is one time I'm glad to see and hope the Indians continue to beat the paleface."

The day after the failed rally, large North Carolinian newspapers such as The News and Observer and The Charlotte Observer ran stories on the clash. Most were favorable to the Lumbees and portrayed the Klansmen as antagonists. Initial reports in state and national newspapers were melodramatic and portrayed the Lumbees using stereotypes associated with Western Plains Indians. The Santa Fe New Mexican misidentified the Lumbees as part of the Eastern Band of Cherokee Indians. The local media in Robeson County did not publish on Sundays, thus it was not until later in the week that the Scottish Chief and The Robesonian released their reporting. Their stories covered the affair and preceding events in detail and avoided the use of caricatures, treating the Lumbees as they did other community residents. On January 23 the Scottish Chief issued an editorial titled "Setting the Record Straight," which criticized the national sensationalism, saying, "all too frequently news mediums are searching for a colorful angle to a story and in doing so stretch or add to the facts."

Local editorials sided with the Lumbees, framing the clash as a conflict between locals and outsiders, though the editorial board of The Robesonian downplayed local discontent with segregation, proclaiming there was "no racial rift" between Native Americans and whites in Robeson County. Editorial pieces from around the United States ridiculed the Klan for their behavior. The Anti-Defamation League reported that the affair "sent a ripple of laughter clear across the country." Reflecting on the national praise for the Lumbees' actions at Hayes Pond in contrast to the muted response to the armed black resistance to the KKK in Monroe in 1957, Robert Williams wrote, "The national press played up the Indian-Klan fight because they didn't consider this a great threat—the Indians are a tiny minority and people could laugh at the incident as a sentimental joke—but no one wanted Negroes to get the impression that this was an accepted way to deal with the Klan."

=== Legal proceedings ===
On January 20, Sheriff McLeod declared that he would seek the arrest of Cole for the disorder. The following day a Robeson County grand jury indicted Cole, Martin, and others unknown to the state for inciting a riot. Cole, who was by then in South Carolina, posted bail, declared his intent to fight extradition back to North Carolina, and said he would host a new rally, saying, "It will be the greatest rally the Klan has had. I expect there will be more than 5,000 Klansmen there and probably more. Klansmen all over the South are pretty upset." This never occurred. Cole was eventually extradited with the permission of the South Carolina governor and held on bond.

On January 23, Martin was tried for the drunkenness and weapons charges before the Recorder's Court in Maxton by Judge Pro Tem Lacy Maynor, the second Native American in Robeson County to ever be elected to a judgeship. Martin denounced the Klan for abandoning him in the field and vowed that he would leave the organization. Maynor thought that the circumstances of the situation were "tragic" and gave Martin a suspended 60-day sentence and a $60 fine. In his sentence the judge told him, "You have helped to bring about nationwide advertisement to a people who do not want that kind of advertisement—who only want to create a community that would be an asset to our nation. If your organization had something worthwhile to offer, we would be happy to have you. But the history of your organization proves that it has nothing to offer".

Cole and Martin both faced the riot charges in the Robeson County Superior Court in Lumberton. Cole argued in his defense that he had legally rented the field, had a right to hold a rally, and that the Lumbees had provoked the situation while McLeod had provided inadequate security. The prosecutors argued that the Klan had aggravated public sentiment by burning crosses in the county and employing inflammatory speech, billed the rally as a public event (thus it was not a private meeting), and that, according to statements made by Martin, had encouraged Klansmen to bring weapons with them. About 350 Lumbees sat in the gallery during the trial. The prosecutor asked the jury, "Gentlemen, you had better stop this. If you don't, there will be more bloodshed." He then pointed to the audience and said, "If you think you can take [any] Kluxer [...] and drive that crowd around, you've got another think a-coming". In March, the jury found Martin and Cole guilty. (Note: Lowery described the jury as "all-white", while Oakley wrote that it was triracial. Craven reported the final jury to be all-white, as two Indians in the jury pool were struck for cause by the judge, while the defense struck two more Indians and one black person.) The judge delivered Cole the most stringent sentence of 18–24 months incarceration, while Martin was given a lesser punishment. Cole appealed his case and was freed on bond pending its reconsideration.

=== Impact on the Ku Klux Klan ===
Cole never organized another public rally in Robeson County after the incident. (Note: According to Lowery, no known Klan rallies have taken place there since. The News & Observer reported that a Klan rally was held in the county in 1984.) In the wake of Cole's and Martin's arrests as well as some disagreements about organization finances, some members of the North Carolina Knights split off and created their own Klan chapters. Cole attempted to rebrand his organization as a militant, "fighting outfit", and used this to recruit new members across the state with some success. Throughout North Carolina, Klan leaders told their members to expect armed resistance to their work and prepare themselves accordingly. In early 1959 Cole was arrested in South Carolina for posing as a private investigator and shortly thereafter lost his appeal in North Carolina for the riot charge and was imprisoned. His incarceration curtailed Klan recruiting and though the North Carolina Knights elected a new grand wizard to replace him, coordinated policing by the State Bureau of Investigation and other agencies—encouraged by Hodges—led to a decline in Klan membership. North Carolina KKK organizations later resurged in the mid-1960s. In 1966, Klansmen declared their intent to hold another rally at the same field near Maxton, provoking the ire of Lumbees. State authorities received reports of Lumbees stockpiling weapons, and a superior court issued an injunction, prohibiting the meeting. Klan challenges to the order were dismissed. North Carolina Knights Grand Dragon Bob Jones told the press, "We want to ally with the Indian and see he gets some civil rights from the government. The Indians have never had an ally and if we're going to give civil rights to the Niggers, we're going to give them to the Indians." Simeon Oxendine was dismissive of these remarks, saying, "I don't think Jones is in a position to give anything to anyone. I think the constitution gives us our rights," and the Native Americans in the county were unreceptive to the invitation.

== Legacy and commemoration ==
Our histories will long record
That perilous advance,
When many a Klansman left the field
With buckshot in his pants.

— Excerpt from Malvina Reynolds' 1958 song on the event, "The Battle of Maxton Field".

The clash has been generally remembered under two monikers: the "Battle of Hayes Pond" or the "Battle of Maxton Field". The media dubbed it the "Maxton Riot". The incident brought national attention to the Lumbee people, with Lumbee historian Adolph Dial later saying, "Until the Klan thing, people didn't even know there were Lumbees." In the aftermath of the battle, most Lumbees recalled it as a purely local affair and an action of self-defense for their community from hostile outsiders; they did not see it as a symbolic protest, an attempt to gain national attention, or as a component of the larger American civil rights movement. Local whites also tended to view the Klan rally as the work of outsiders from South Carolina. In 1958, California-based folk singer Malvina Reynolds wrote a song about the incident, entitled, "The Battle of Maxton Field", which satirized the Klan, and was later covered by folk musician Pete Seeger to commercial success.

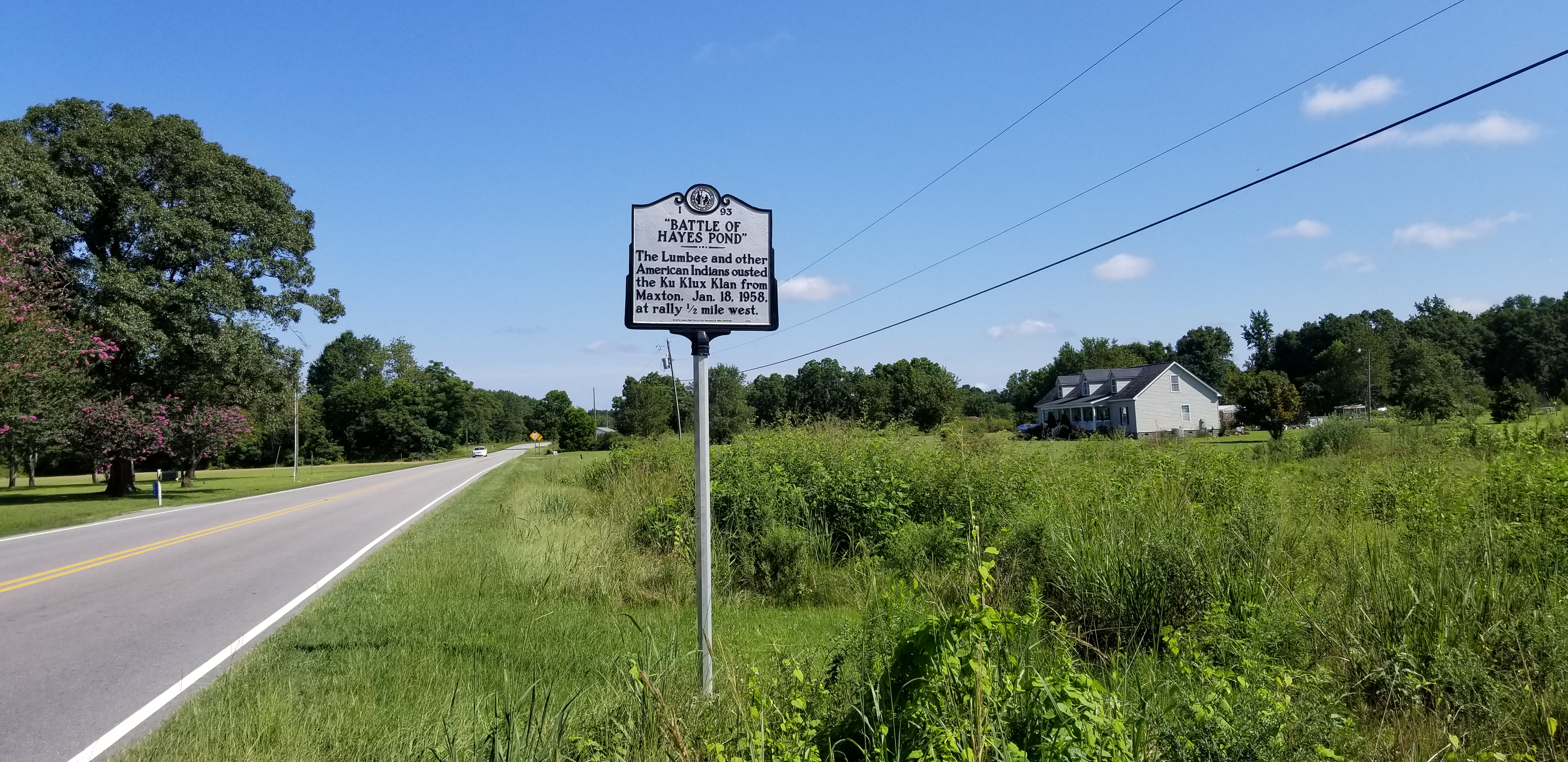
Battle of Hayes Pond highway marker

Since 1958, several Lumbee authors have written accounts of the battle, and the Lumbee Tribe included a recounting in its 1987 petition for full federal recognition to the Bureau of Indian Affairs. In the 2020s, Lumbee author Kaden Thompson published a historical fiction novel centering around the clash. Newspapers in North Carolina have periodically cited the clash in their discussions of the Klan and white supremacy. In 2003 the Lumbee Tribe presented 100 "Lumbee Warriors"—persons verified to have been involved in the Hayes Pond battle—with a medal of honor. In 2011 the Lumbee Tribal Council passed an ordinance declaring January 18 a "Tribal Day of Historical Recognition". On June 26, 2018, North Carolina erected a highway historical marker at the convergence of NC Highway 130 and Maxton Pond Road near Maxton to commemorate the event.

In October 2021, politician Charles Graham, a Lumbee from Robeson County, released a video advertisement for his 2022 campaign in North Carolina's 9th congressional district which recounted the battle. The video went viral on the internet, garnering over 4 million views within 24 hours, and 8 million within three days on the social media platforms Twitter, Facebook and TikTok, becoming the most viewed congressional advertisement ever. Graham said he used the event in his campaign to showcase "history where people of all walks of life came together to stand against absolute evil."

== Works cited ==
- Ahearn, Lorraine (2016). Narrative Paths of Native American Resistance: Tracing Agency and Commemoration in Journalism Texts in Eastern North Carolina, 1872–1988 (PhD thesis). University of North Carolina at Chapel Hill. OCLC 1105761379. ProQuest 1805650883.
- Batchelor, John E. (2015). Race and Education in North Carolina: From Segregation to Desegregation. Baton Rouge: Louisiana University Press. ISBN 978-0-8071-6137-1.
- Blu, Karen I. (2001). The Lumbee Problem: The Making of an American Indian People (reprint ed.). Lincoln: University of Nebraska Press. ISBN 978-0-8032-6197-6.
- Chalmers, David Mark (2005). Backfire: How the Ku Klux Klan Helped the Civil Rights Movement (reprint ed.). Rowman & Littlefield. ISBN 978-0-7425-2311-1.
- Cunningham, David (2013). Klansville, U.S.A: The Rise and Fall of the Civil Rights-era Ku Klux Klan (illustrated, reprint ed.). Oxford University Press USA. ISBN 978-0-19-975202-7.
- Dial, Adolph L.; Eliades, David K. (1996). The Only Land I Know: A History of the Lumbee Indians (1st Syracuse University Press ed.). Syracuse: Syracuse University Press. ISBN 978-0-8156-0360-3.
- Lowery, Malinda Maynor (2018). The Lumbee Indians: An American Struggle. Chapel Hill: UNC Press Books. ISBN 978-1-4696-4638-1.
- Lowery, Malinda Maynor (2010). Lumbee Indians in the Jim Crow South: Race, Identity, and the Making of a Nation. Chapel Hill: University of North Carolina Press. ISBN 978-0-8078-3368-1.
- Oakley, Christopher Arris (2008). "'When Carolina Indians Went on the Warpath': The Media, the Klan, and the Lumbees of North Carolina" (PDF). Southern Cultures. 14 (4): 55–84. doi:10.1353/scu.0.0022. ISSN 1068-8218. S2CID 143772906.
- Waters, T. L., ed. (1977), US-74 Construction from Laurinburg Bypass to US-74 and SR-1362 Intersection, Scotland/Robeson Counties: Environmental Impact Statement, Raleigh: North Carolina Department of Transportation
- Williams, Walter L., ed. (2009). Southeastern Indians Since the Removal Era. Athens: University of Georgia Press. ISBN 978-0-8203-3203-1.
