= Glenn Maynor =

American law enforcement officer

Sheriff of Robeson County, North Carolina
- In office December 5, 1994 – December 30, 2004
- Preceded by: Hubert Stone
- Succeeded by: Kenneth Sealey

Personal details
- Born: 1946 (age 79–80) Lumberton, North Carolina, United States
- Party: Democratic Party

Glenn Allen Maynor (born 1946) is an American retired law enforcement officer and politician who served as Sheriff of Robeson County, North Carolina from 1994 until 2004.

== Early life ==
Glenn Maynor was born in 1946 in Lumberton, North Carolina, United States. He is a Lumbee Native American. He attended Magnolia High School and played on the school's basketball team, later attending Fayetteville Technical Community College and the University of North Carolina at Pembroke. He married Lois Jacobs and had four sons and a daughter with her.

== Career ==
Maynor worked for the Lumberton Police Department for about four years, first as a dispatcher and then as the department's first Native American patrol officer. He then worked as the executive director of the Lumberton Housing Authority from 1976 to 1994. He served on the Lumberton City Council from 1975 to 1994, and served as the first Native American mayor pro tempore of the city in 1981.

During his long tenure as Sheriff of Robeson County, Hubert Stone provoked the ire of the Lumbee community. Maynor challenged him in the Democratic primary in 1990, declaring his intention to improve relations between the sheriff's office and the community. Stone defeated him in a run-off and retained the office. Stone decided not to run for reelection in 1994 and reportedly favored detective Lum Edwards to succeed him. Edwards was defeated by Maynor in the Democratic primary on 31 May, receiving the overwhelming support of the Native American community and splitting the black vote, but garnering little support from white voters. He subsequently won the November general election, securing most of the support of the Native American and black electorate to defeat Republican James Sanderson. He was sworn in as sheriff on December 5, 1994, in a large ceremony in front of the Robeson County Courthouse in Lumberton. He became the first non-white person to hold the office. In his inaugural address he pledged to cooperate with other law enforcement agencies in combatting crime in the county. Responding to his status as the first Lumbee sheriff, he said, "I want to be remembered in history as the sheriff that united this county racially and brought it together." Speaking on concerns of corruption, he said, "If I think or hear of any evidence that [deputies are] taking any kind of bribe, I'll fire them."

In June 1996 North Carolina Governor Jim Hunt appointed Maynor to a 21-person commission on racial and religious violence. Stone attempted to regain the office of sheriff in 1998, challenging Maynor in the May 5 Democratic primary. Maynor defeated the challenge by a large margin and faced no opposition in the general election. During the campaign he pledged to re-open the investigation into the 1988 murder of Lumbee activist Julian Pierce, but he never did so. Maynor was re-elected to a third term in 2002, securing over 60% of the vote against three challengers. Maynor resigned on December 30, 2004, citing "health reasons" centering around a heart condition. He was succeeded by Kenneth Sealey.

== Criminal conviction ==
Corruption allegations against members of the Robeson County Sheriff's Office were common by the time Maynor became sheriff. In 2002 Robeson County District Attorney Johnson Britt requested that the North Carolina State Bureau of Investigation (SBI) open an inquiry into the sheriff's department after being told by an informant that two deputies had been involved in a home invasion. The SBI then commenced Operation Tarnished Badge, which became the largest investigation of police corruption in state history. The operation discovered that sheriff's deputies were involved in stealing money and drugs from narcotics dealers and reselling the latter. Maynor was aware of some of the criminal activity of his deputies.

A total of 22 law enforcement officers were implicated in the investigation, including Maynor; he was accused of lying to a federal grand jury about his knowledge of deputies selling counterfeit satellite television cards and additionally charged with using on-duty deputies to do his yardwork and work at a campaign fundraiser. He pleaded guilty to perjury and misuse of federal funds in June 2008. The judge rejected the negotiated sentence of a plea deal and sentenced him to six years in prison, surpassing the recommended sentence of the United States Attorney. He was also ordered to pay $17,550 in restitution to the federal government for the misused funds. Responding to the scale of corruption within the sheriff's department during his tenure, Maynor said he had "dropped the ball" and that the problems arose from his lack of oversight, as he was attending to family health matters at the time. Following an appeal, his sentence was later reduced to two years in prison. Maynor was incarcerated at Fort Dix on August 27 in New Jersey. On March 23, 2010, he was released early to spend the last two months of his sentence under house arrest. Following his release he did part-time work for Hunt and Brooks Attorney at Law and became a member of the board of directors of a non-profit.

== Works cited ==
- Lowery, Malinda Maynor (2018). The Lumbee Indians: An American Struggle. Chapel Hill: UNC Press Books. ISBN 9781469646381.
- Mitchell, Memory F., ed. (2000). Addresses and Public Papers of James Baxter Hunt, Jr. Governor of North Carolina. Vol. 3. Raleigh: Division of Archives and History, North Carolina Department of Cultural Resources. ISBN 9780865262898.
