= Malcolm McLeod =

American sheriff (1914–1987)

Sheriff of Robeson County, North Carolina
- In office December 4, 1950 – 1978
- Preceded by: Willis Britt
- Succeeded by: Hubert Stone

Personal details
- Born: May 29, 1914 Lumberton, North Carolina, U.S.
- Died: June 3, 1987 (aged 73) Lumberton, North Carolina, U.S.
- Party: Democratic Party

Malcolm Gray McLeod (May 29, 1914 – June 3, 1987) was an American law enforcement officer who served as the Sheriff of Robeson County, North Carolina from 1950 to 1978. Born in Lumberton, he worked as a service station operator and a grocery salesman before deciding to run for the office of sheriff in 1950, pledging to modernize the office and crack down on bootlegging. He won, and in his early tenure worked closely with District Solicitor Malcolm Buie Seawell to destroy thousands of illicit alcohol distilleries and oversee hundreds of arrests for bootlegging. In 1958 he maintained order during a civil disturbance at the Battle of Hayes Pond. Over the course of his tenure the size of the sheriff's department expanded and he hired several black and Native American deputies. In 1971 McLeod established a drugs division in the department to combat the narcotics trade. At the time of his retirement in 1978 he was the longest-serving sheriff in Robeson County's history.

== Early life ==
Malcolm McLeod was born on May 29, 1914 in Lumberton, North Carolina, United States to Alphus McLeod, the Chief of Police of Lumberton, and Alice McLeod. He was educated at Lumberton High School and thereafter attended Wake Forest College, where he played football. After a year he transferred to Mars Hill College, but dropped out due to the Great Depression. He married Mary Lois Allen and had two children with her. He worked as a service station operator until he became a salesman for M. H. McLean Wholesale Grocery, holding that job for 10 years.

== Shrieval career ==
=== 1950 election ===
On March 1, 1950, McLeod declared his candidacy for the office of Sheriff of Robeson County, North Carolina, running against the incumbent sheriff, Willis Britt, and former sheriff Clyde Wade. His campaign slogan was "Big Man—Big Job" and he ran on a platform of modernization, promising to equip the sheriff's department with radios, improve record keeping, and institute 24-hour operations. When his opponents made similar promises, McLeod, in an attempt to distinguish himself, declared that he would crack down on bootlegging. Robeson was a dry county, and bootleggers historically had connections with local law enforcement, financing their political activities in exchange for tolerance of their operations. McLeod won the November election, and in response several sheriff's deputies resigned from office. A few days before he was due to assume the office, Britt dismissed all of the remaining deputies, leaving the office without any personnel. He was sworn in on December 4, 1950, and reinstated the deputies removed by Britt. Two weeks later he moved the sheriff's office into the larger space of the former offices of the register of deeds.

=== Crackdowns on bootlegging ===
McLeod had no law enforcement experience or legal expertise when he assumed office as sheriff. Thus, early in his career, he frequently sought the guidance of 9th Solicitorial District Solicitor Malcolm Buie Seawell in his attempts to combat bootlegging. After about a month into his tenure he shut down over 70 illicit alcohol distilleries. During his first four years in office the sheriff's department arrested 521 men for crimes related to illegal alcohol production. In the first six years of his tenure the sheriff's office seized 4,379 illicit stills. The crackdowns declined as demand for moonshine diminished due to better job opportunities in the county, the proliferation of legal alcohol, and the growth of the drug trade. By the time he left office in 1978, McLeod reported that his department "won't tear up 10 stills a year".

=== Battle of Hayes Pond ===
Robeson County had a triracial population of whites, blacks, and Native Americans—including Lumbee and Tuscarora. In the late 1950s the white supremacist Ku Klux Klan organization grew in strength in North Carolina. In January 1958 Klan leader James W. "Catfish" Cole began organizing activity in Robeson County meant to intimidate the local Lumbee population. Cole announced his intention to host a Klan rally near Pembroke, the center of the Lumbee community, to denounce the "mongrelization" of the races. He ended up leasing a field at Hayes Pond near Maxton for the gathering. In the lead up to the rally, media reports raised the possibility of violence between the Klansmen and the Lumbee, who were growing increasingly agitated by the Klan's activities. McLeod drove to Cole's home in South Carolina and pleaded with him to cancel the rally. Cole went ahead with the event on January 18.

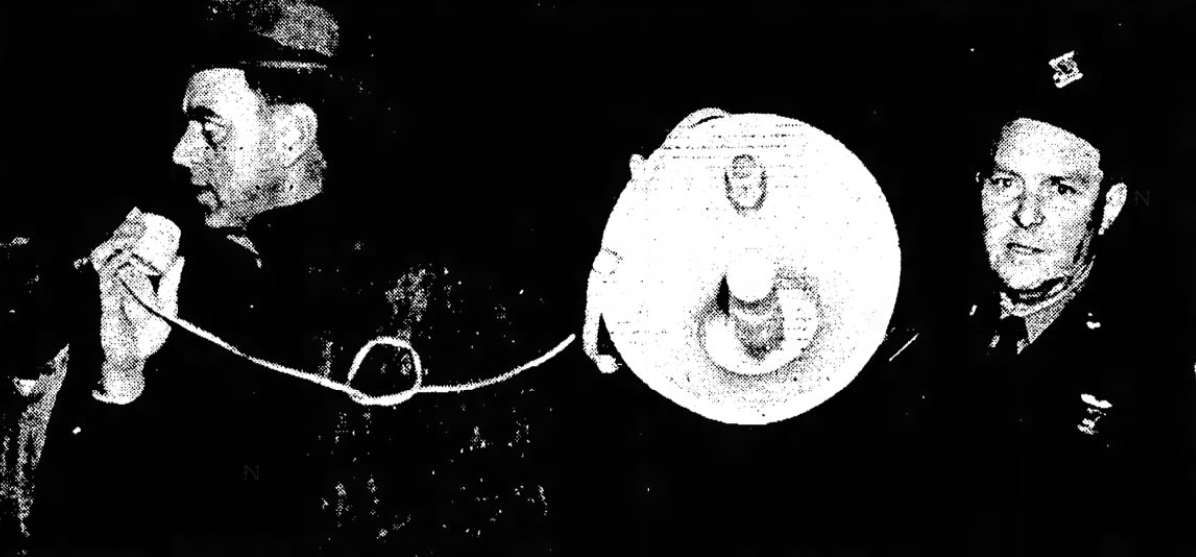
Sheriff McLeod (left) and a highway patrol captain urging the crowd at the Battle of Hayes Pond to disperse

As the Klansmen began setting up their rally at Hayes Pond that evening, members of the Lumbee community began congregating on the nearby road. McLeod and some of his deputies came to the rally to maintain order, while officers of the North Carolina Highway Patrol waited further up the road to assist in the event violence broke out. At about 8:15 PM, the few hundred Lumbee exited their cars and surrounded Cole and his approximately 50 Klansmen and began shouting insults at them. McLeod pulled Cole aside and said, "Well, you know how it is. I can't control the crowd with the few men I've got. I'm not telling you to not hold a meeting, but you see how it is." Cole refused to suspend the rally, and over the next few minutes the situation grew tenser as Klansmen and Lumbee brandished firearms at one another. Shortly before 8:30 PM, two Lumbee smashed the Klansmens' light, plunging the field into darkness. After a momentary silence, the Lumbees began firing their guns into the air, and the Klansmen broke and fled into the surrounding wilderness. McLeod's deputies fired two tear gas grenades, and within a few minutes the highway patrol officers arrived to assist them. By 9:00 PM McLeod and the state police officers had restored order. He arrested one Klansmen, James Martin, for public drunkenness and carrying a concealed weapon.

Governor Luther H. Hodges denounced the Klan and called McLeod to promise him support if needed. On January 20 McLeod declared that he would seek the arrest of Cole for the disorder. The following day a Robeson County grand jury indicted Cole, Martin, and others unknown to the state for inciting a riot. In his trial, Cole blamed the Lumbees for starting the fighting and accused McLeod of not providing the rally enough protection. He was later convicted and sentenced to 18 to 20 months in prison. McLeod preferred to avoid discussing the events at Hayes Pond later in his life, saying "I think it was bad for the people of Robeson County and I just don't want the county to get hurt anymore."

=== Other activities ===
In September 1953 Flora MacLeod of MacLeod visited the United States and toured St. Pauls, North Carolina. McLeod met her and declared her an honorary deputy sheriff in recognition of her position within the Clan MacLeod. The following year Britt challenged McLeod for his office but lost. In 1958 he received training from the FBI National Academy. During his tenure the sheriff's department expanded its force from a size of 13 deputies to 46. He also integrated the department, hiring its first black and Native American deputies.

In 1956 McLeod served as president of the North Carolina Sheriffs' Association. He served as president of the National Sheriffs' Association from 1964 to 1965 and for a time was its treasurer.

=== Later career ===
In 1971 McLeod established a drugs division in the sheriff's department to combat the narcotics trade. That year the North Carolina General Assembly created the Training and Standards Council to set employment standards for law enforcement officers. McLeod was made head of the council. In 1974 he took courses in police administration and arson at the Institute of Government at the University of North Carolina at Chapel Hill.

In 1974 McLeod faced his first serious electoral challenge when O. Tom Blanks ran against him in the shrieval contest. In the primary election McLeod won 8,870 votes, while Blanks won 7,809 votes. Blanks called for a run-off election in which he was defeated. He was declared Master Detective's "National Police Officer of the Month" in January 1976. McLeod retired in 1978 and was succeeded as sheriff by Hubert Stone, explaining, "After 26 years it just got old for me. I lost my enthusiasm." At the time of his retirement he was the longest-serving sheriff in Robeson County's history.

== Later life ==
McLeod suffered a heart attack and died on June 3, 1987. In 1988 he was posthumously inducted into the Institute of Government's Law Officers Hall of Fame.

== Works cited ==
- Batchelor, John E. (2015). Race and Education in North Carolina: From Segregation to Desegregation. Louisiana University Press. ISBN 9780807161371.
- Brammer, Dana Beard; Hurley, James E. (1968). A Study of the Office of Sheriff in the United States, Southern Region: 1967. Bureau of Governmental Research, University of Mississippi.
- Lowery, Malinda Maynor (2018). The Lumbee Indians: An American Struggle. Chapel Hill: UNC Press Books. ISBN 9781469646381.
- North Carolina Sheriffs' Association Directory (PDF) (2019–2020 ed.), Raleigh: North Carolina Sheriffs' Association, 2019
- Oakley, Christopher Arris (2008). ""When Carolina Indians Went on the Warpath": The Media, the Klan, and the Lumbees of North Carolina". Southern Cultures. 14 (4): 55–84. ISSN 1068-8218.
- Tyner, K. Blake (2014). Lumberton. Arcadia Publishing. ISBN 9781467120258.
