= Wakulla, North Carolina =

- CDP
- Location within the state of North Carolina
- Coordinates: 34°47′49″N 79°15′21″W
- Country: United States
- State: North Carolina
- County: Robeson

Area
  - Total: 0.86 sq mi (2.23 km^{2})
  - Land: 0.86 sq mi (2.23 km^{2})
  - Water: 0 sq mi (0.00 km^{2})
- Elevation: 207 ft (63 m)

Population (2020)
  - Total: 112
  - Density: 130.2/sq mi (50.27/km^{2})
- Time zone: UTC-5 (Eastern (EST))
  - Summer (DST): UTC-4 (EDT)
- FIPS code: 37-53950
- GNIS feature ID: 2584334

Wakulla is a census-designated place (CDP) in Robeson County, North Carolina, United States. As of the 2020 census, Wakulla had a population of 112.

== History ==
Wakulla was settled in 1860 and named by Colonel Peter P. Smith reportedly using a local indigenous name meaning "clear water" in reference to nearby springs.

== Geography ==
According to the United States Census Bureau, the CDP has a total area of 0.86 square miles (2.2 km^{2}), all land.

The Wakulla community is generally considered to be located between the roads of Rev. Bill and Doc Henderson, and to extend to Mt. Zion and Beaver Dam Roads, with its center being at Oxendine Elementary School and Cherokee Chapel Holiness Methodist Church.

== Demographics ==
Historical population
Census	Pop.	Note	%±
2020	112		—
U.S. Decennial Census

As of the census of 2010, there were 150 people living in the CDP. The population density was 177.18 people per square mile. The racial makeup of the CDP was:

- 86.67% Native American
- 12.38% White
- 3.81% Hispanic or Latino of any race
- 0.95% African American
- 0.00% Pacific Islander
- 0.00% other races
- 0.00% of two or more races

== Oxendine family ==
Luther and Susan L. Oxendine were the first Native American family to own land in Wakulla. They donated this land, partially to help establish Oxendine Elementary School and Cherokee Chapel Holiness Methodist Church.

== Oxendine School ==
The school was built on land donated by the Oxendines in 1910. It burned down twice and was rebuilt twice. The school is still standing and functions to this day.

== Cherokee Chapel Holiness Methodist Church ==
The church started as a brush arbor in 1914 and was built on land donated by Luther and Susan L. Oxendine in 1915. It was originally called Wakulla Mission. It celebrated its 100-year anniversary in 2014, making it one of the oldest Native American-founded churches in existence. Cherokee Chapel Holiness Methodist Church is a part of the Lumber River Conference of the Holiness Methodist Church, sometimes referred to as "Lumbee" River Holiness Methodist Church Conference, the oldest and to date the only Native American-founded church conference.

== Notable people ==
- William S. McArthur (1951-) - astronaut
- Julian Pierce (1946-1988) - Lumbee politician and slain civil rights leader
