= James R. Jordan Sr. =

Father of Michael Jordan (1936–1993)

- Born: James Raymond Jordan; July 31, 1936; Wallace, North Carolina, U.S.
- Died: July 23, 1993 (aged 56); Lumberton, North Carolina, U.S.
- Cause of death: Gunshot wound
- Resting place: Rockfish African Methodist Episcopal Church Cemetery
- Other name: Ray Jordan
- Education: Charity High School
- Known for: Father of Michael Jordan
- Spouse: Deloris Peoples (m. 1956)
- Children: 5, including Michael
- Relatives: Jeffrey Jordan (grandson); Marcus Jordan (grandson)

James Raymond Jordan Sr. (July 31, 1936 – July 23, 1993) was a mechanic and the father of former basketball player and businessman Michael Jordan.

== Life ==
Jordan was born on July 31, 1936, in Wallace, North Carolina. While attending Charity High School, he met Deloris Peoples (born September 1941). The two began dating and remained together for the next three years. Upon graduation, Jordan joined the United States Air Force and was stationed in San Antonio, Texas. In 1958, he transferred to a base in Virginia and married Peoples shortly thereafter. Their first child, James Ronald "Ronnie" Jr., was born the following year. Jordan left the Air Force and got a job at a textile mill in Wallace. The Jordans had two more children while in Wallace, Deloris and Larry. The Jordans brought up their children in the Methodist faith.

In 1963, the Jordan family moved to Brooklyn so that Jordan could receive mechanic's training on the G.I. Bill. He studied airplane hydraulics, while Peoples found work at a bank. While living in Brooklyn, the Jordans had another child, son Michael. As crime began to increase in Brooklyn in the 1960s, the Jordans moved back to North Carolina to raise their children in a safer environment. Upon completing his 18 months' training, Jordan and his family moved to Wilmington, North Carolina. It was there that the couple's fifth child, Roslyn, was born.

A lifelong basketball fan, Jordan played a large role in inspiring his son Michael to become an athlete and traveled the United States to follow his son's career, first at the University of North Carolina and then with the Chicago Bulls.

Nonetheless, Jordan was also a very big baseball fan, having gone semi-pro himself. In his autobiography and in interviews throughout his career, son Michael recounted that it was his father's vision that he become a baseball star. Baseball was, in fact, the first sport Jordan had taught him to play. Michael recounted that this was a major factor in his decision to try baseball after his first retirement from the NBA.

In her memoir In My Family's Shadow, Jordan's daughter Deloris accused him of sexually abusing her between the ages of 8 and 16.

Ben Affleck and Matt Damon produced a film called Air about Nike's signing of Michael Jordan and ultimately the Air Jordan brand. Julius Tennon plays James Jordan in the film.

== Murder ==
On July 23, 1993, while returning home after a day of playing golf, Jordan stopped to rest during his drive in southeastern North Carolina. He parked his red Lexus SC400 in the parking lot of a Quality Inn near the intersection of U.S. 74 and Interstate 95, south of Lumberton. Some accounts have stated that the vehicle may have later been moved from the roadside into the parking lot.

According to testimony later given by Larry Martin Demery, he and Daniel Andre Green noticed Jordan's vehicle, which had recently been purchased for him by his son, Michael Jordan. The vehicle bore the North Carolina license plate "UNC0023". Prosecutors said that Green shot Jordan while he slept in the car before the pair stole the vehicle. Jordan's body was discovered on August 10, 1993, in a swamp near McColl, South Carolina. Due to advanced decomposition, he was not identified until August 13 through dental records supplied by the family dentist.

Before identification was completed, the body had been cremated by the coroner because of limited storage space. Jordan's jaw and hands were preserved for identification purposes before later being cremated and returned to the family with the remaining ashes.

Jordan's ashes were placed in an urn inside a casket and buried at Rockfish African Methodist Episcopal Church in Teachey, North Carolina, on August 15, 1993.

Green and Demery also stole several items from the vehicle, including two NBA championship rings gifted to Jordan by his son. Investigators later traced several calls made from Jordan's mobile phone, leading to the arrests of Green and Demery.

Following his arrest, Demery stated that the pair had intended only to rob and restrain Jordan, and alleged that Green unexpectedly shot him. Green did not testify during the trial. Both men were convicted of murder and robbery and sentenced to life imprisonment. Green's defense attorney, Woodberry Bowen, argued that Demery had an incentive to falsely identify Green as the shooter. Prosecutor Johnson Britt countered that Demery's testimony also implicated himself more directly in the crime.

In 2010, the case became one of nearly 200 reviewed by the North Carolina State Bureau of Investigation after it was discovered that laboratory technicians had mishandled or omitted evidence in multiple cases. The Jordan case was later removed from the review list.

On July 23, 2018, Chris Mumma, executive director of the North Carolina Center on Actual Innocence, stated that evidence indicated Green may not have committed the murder. Green maintained that Demery had only asked him to help dispose of the body.

On August 3, 2018, Superior Court Judge Winston Gilchrist considered several motions related to the case and scheduled a hearing for December. During a December 5 hearing, Mumma requested expanded access to evidence that she argued could support a new trial. On March 6, 2019, Gilchrist declined to grant Green a new hearing, and Mumma said the decision would be appealed.

In October 2024, Gregory Weeks, the judge who presided over the original murder trial, petitioned North Carolina's parole commission to release Green. Weeks stated that analyses by a forensic blood expert that might have affected the outcome of the trial had not been disclosed to the defense. Green also sought perjury charges against Demery and Demery's attorney.

In August 2020, Demery was approved for parole by the North Carolina Post-Release Supervision and Parole Commission, with a scheduled release date in August 2023. The release date was later postponed to August 2024. In December 2021, the commission terminated Demery's scheduled parole release following another review, and set his next parole review hearing for December 2023. Demery's parole hearing was cancelled, and state records do not show a subsequent public reinstatement of his parole.
