= Christopher Oakley (historian) =

American historian

Christopher Arris Oakley is an American historian who specializes in North Carolina Indians.

Oakley earned his B.A. from the University of North Carolina and his Ph.D. from the University of Tennessee. From 2003 to 2005 he was a visiting professor of history at High Point University. In 2005 he joined the history department at East Carolina University.

== Works ==
His first book, Keeping the Circle: American Indian Identity in Eastern North Carolina 1885–2004, was published in 2005 by University of Nebraska Press. He is also the author of numerous journal articles, including The Legend of Henry Berry Lowry: Strike at the Wind and the Lumbee Indians of Robeson County which was published by Mississippi Quarterly in 2007, When Carolina Indians Went on the Warpath: The Media, The Klan, and the Lumbee Indians of North Carolina in Southern Cultures in 2008, and "The Native South in the Post World War II Era," in The Native South, also in 2008. In 2009 his "The Center of the World: The Principle People and the Great Smoky Mountains” appeared in Jessica Christie's Landscapes of Origin in the Americas published by the University of Alabama Press. In 2010 he became a co-author of Native Carolinians: The Indians of North Carolina which was published by the North Carolina Department of Cultural Resources.
