= James W. "Catfish" Cole =

American Ku Klux Klan leader (1924–1967)

James William "Catfish" Cole (June 14, 1924 – July 27, 1967) was an American soldier and evangelist who was leader of the Ku Klux Klan of North Carolina and South Carolina, serving as a Grand Dragon.

== Rise to infamy ==
Cole attended Grainger High School in Kinston, North Carolina, and served in the military during World War II. For a time, he drove a taxicab in Kinston and it was around this time that he acquired the nickname "Catfish". In 1953 he and his wife, Carolyn, began Southern Bible College in Marion, South Carolina. Cole was ordained into the ministry by the Wayside Baptist Church in Summerfield, North Carolina in 1958. While in Marion, he toured North Carolina and South Carolina as a tent evangelist and broadcast a Sunday morning radio program, "The Free Will Hour". During this period he became an active member of the Knights of the Ku Klux Klan, eventually becoming Grand Dragon in both North Carolina and South Carolina. Cole's rallies drew as many as 15,000. Cole incited violence against blacks, and after his rallies Klan motorcades often drove through black neighborhoods in order to terrorize the inhabitants (accompanied by the police, who maintained that they accompanied the Klan to keep order).

== Conflict with the Black Armed Guard ==
Albert E. Perry, a black doctor in Monroe, North Carolina, was presumed to be financing the local chapter of the NAACP, and consequently he received numerous death threats from the Klan. In 1957, Robert F. Williams, president of the local chapter of the NAACP, was granted a charter from the National Rifle Association to form a local affiliate, which Williams dubbed the "Black Armed Guard". The group was composed mostly of World War II veterans and quickly began organizing for self-defense, guarding Perry's house in shifts. Not making a mention of their race, the group sent a letter to the National Rifle Association of America asking for a charter, stating that they were a group of veterans who wanted to continue training in case they be called on to serve once again. The charter was granted.

Their preparations paid off on October 5, 1957, when Cole held a rally near Monroe. After the rally, a Klan motorcade headed to Perry's house, accompanied by shouting and the firing of weapons at houses along the way. When they reached Perry's house, the defenders returned fire from their fortified positions, and the Klan turned and ran. The city government in Monroe banned Klan motorcades the next day (though they went on to target Williams and his organization). After this unexpected resistance in Monroe, Cole directed his attention to the Lumbee in Robeson County.

== Battle of Hayes Pond ==
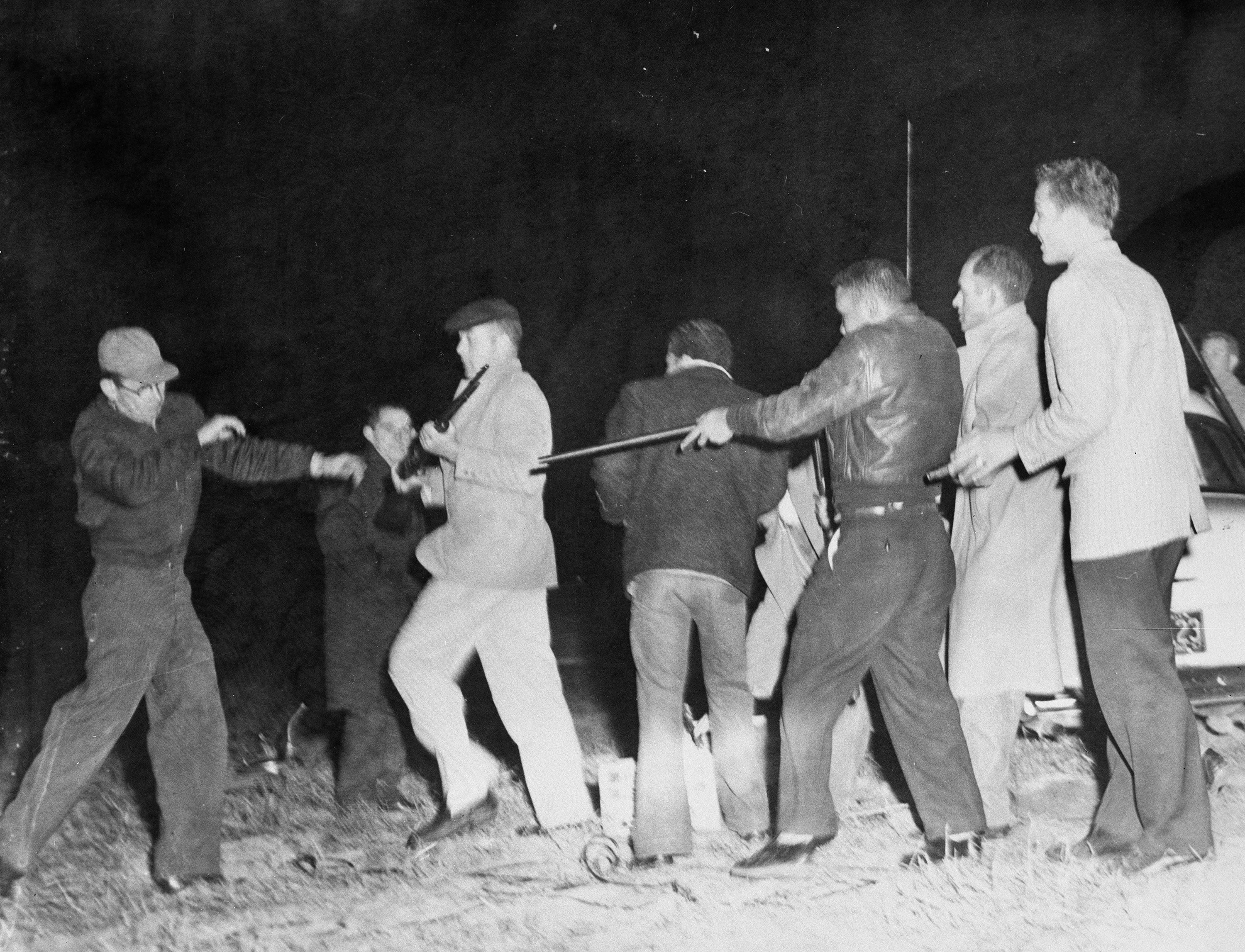
Lumbee Indians fighting Ku Klux Klansmen during the Battle of Hayes Pond

Cole is best known for his harassment of the Lumbee Natives of Robeson County, North Carolina and received brief national attention in 1958 for his role in the Battle of Hayes Pond when armed Lumbees attacked a Klan rally and routed the Klansmen. Cole considered the Lumbee to be a "mongrel" race, and in 1957 began a campaign of harassment against them, announcing "There's about 30,000 half-breeds in Robeson County and we are going to have a cross burning and scare them up." Cole gave several speeches inciting whites against the Lumbee and staged a cross burning in St. Pauls, North Carolina at the home of a Lumbee woman he claimed was having an affair with a white man.

In the midst of Cole's campaign of terror against the Lumbee, Cole was warned by local law enforcement officials that his public speeches and demonstrations would provoke a reaction from the Lumbee. Undeterred, he called a Klan rally to be held on January 18, 1958, near the small town of Maxton where Cole predicted 5,000 Klansmen would remind the Lumbee of "their place". Realizing that the Lumbee would use this rally to muster together their own show of force, only 50 Klan members arrived to attend the rally. Cole and his fellow Klansmen were attacked by a heavily armed force of over 500 Lumbees. The battle turned to a rout as Cole and the Klansmen fled into the nearby swamps.

== Aftermath ==
Whereas Cole's defeat in Monroe was met with indifference by the press, the Klan's failed confrontation with the Lumbees was highly publicized and led to Cole's arrest and conviction. Cole served a prison sentence (1959–1960) for inciting the riot after which he moved to Portsmouth, Virginia. There, Cole briefly worked illegally as an unlicensed private detective before returning to Kinston, North Carolina, in 1962, to operate a print shop. Cole began the Helping Hands C.B. Club in Greensboro and was also involved in the Committee for Better Government, a political action group with Ku Klux Klan overtones. In 1966, Cole attempted a takeover of the Klan organization. The move failed and Cole was banished. He later attempted to intimidate a black preacher with a cross-burning rally, but was arrested.

== Death ==
He died on July 27, 1967, from injuries sustained in a car accident.
