= The Robesonian =

Newspaper published in North Carolina, USA

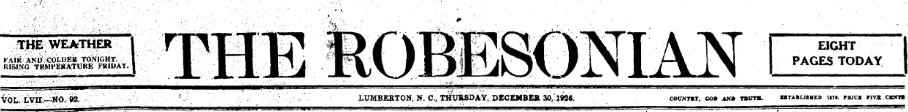
- The Robesonian nameplate c. 1926
- Type: Daily newspaper
- Owner: Champion Media
- Founder: W.S. McDiamid
- Publisher: Denise Ward
- Editor: David Kennard
- Founded: 1870
- Headquarters: 2175 N. Roberts Ave., Lumberton, North Carolina, US
- Circulation: 60,000
- ISSN: 2474-2236
- OCLC number: 10467669
- Website: robesonian.com

The Robesonian is a newspaper published in Lumberton, North Carolina, Tuesday through Friday afternoon and Saturday and Sunday morning.

The Robesonian traces its heritage back to 1870, when it was established by W.S. McDiamid, a Baptist preacher. The Robesonian was previously owned by Heartland Publications. In 2012 Versa Capital Management merged Heartland Publications, Ohio Community Media, the former Freedom papers it had acquired, and Impressions Media into a new company, Civitas Media. Civitas Media sold its properties in the Carolinas to Champion Media in 2017.

== Notable events ==
The newspaper attracted national attention when on February 1, 1988, when two Native Americans entered the newspaper's offices armed and took 20 hostages. The stand-off lasted ten hours; Timothy Jacobs and Eddie Hatcher hoped to attract attention to the plight of American Indians, and later, after their arrest, had a local civil rights attorney deliver a letter to Mikhail Gorbachev in anticipation of a summit between Ronald Reagan and Gorbachev.

The newspaper attracted more attention in August, 2018, when it stopped providing its 8-page Sunday color comics section. An editorial on July 28, 2018 entitled "Trump’s newsprint tariffs force not-so-funny decision" blame the cost of newsprint from Canada, a target "in Trump's Tariff Wars."

The Robesonian is a member of the North Carolina Press Association.

== See also ==
- List of newspapers in North Carolina
