= Julian Pierce =

American lawyer

Julian Thomas Pierce
- Born: January 2, 1946; Hoke County, North Carolina, U.S.
- Died: March 25/26, 1988 (aged 42); Wakulla, North Carolina, U.S.
- Education: Pembroke State College (B.S.); North Carolina Central University (J.D.); Georgetown University (Master of Laws)
- Occupations: chemist, attorney

Julian Thomas Pierce (January 2, 1946 – March 25/26, 1988) was an American lawyer and Lumbee activist. Born in Hoke County, North Carolina, he became the first person in his family to go to college and worked for several years as a chemist at shipyards in Virginia before obtaining his Juris Doctor degree. Following two years of work for the U.S. Securities and Exchange Commission, he moved to Robeson County, North Carolina to direct a legal aid organization and in that capacity co-authored a petition to the federal government asking for the extension of federal recognition to the Lumbee tribe. In 1988 he resigned from his job to pursue a candidacy for a new Superior Court judgeship. Running against the local district attorney and over the objections of the county sheriff, he was found murdered in his home several weeks before the primary election. While his murder was officially determined to be the result of an interpersonal dispute, the circumstances of his death remain unclear, with his friends and family having advanced suspicions that he was assassinated for political reasons.

== Early life ==
Julian Pierce was born in Hoke County, North Carolina, on January 2, 1946, to John S. Pierce and Mary J. Pierce. The Pierces were Lumbee Indian tenant farmers who had moved to the Hoke Indian community of Hawkeye from Chesterfield County, South Carolina. Julian was one of 13 children. He attended Antioch Elementary School and then Hawkeye Elementary and High School, from which he graduated in 1962 at the age of 16. He then attended Pembroke State College in Pembroke, North Carolina, graduating with a Bachelor of Science degree in Chemistry in 1966. He was the first person in his family to obtain a college degree. He married and had three children, but eventually separated from his wife.

== Career ==
=== Early activities ===
After graduating from Pembroke State College, Pierce became a chemist for the Newport News Shipbuilding and Dry Dock Company in Newport News, Virginia. There he worked on chemical instruments, quality control testing, and decontaminating nuclear reactors. In 1969, he became a chemist in the U.S. Navy Shipyard in Norfolk, Virginia, where he performed similar work. In 1973, Pierce moved back to North Carolina and enrolled at the North Carolina Central University School of Law. After graduating from law school in 1976, he became an attorney for the U.S. Securities and Exchange Commission's office of general counsel in Washington, D.C. In that capacity, he mostly compiled briefs on the commission's behalf, though he also occasionally represented it in court. While working there, Pierce attended Georgetown School of Law to earn his Master of Laws in Taxation.

=== Legal defense and Lumbee recognition ===
In 1978, Pierce moved to Robeson County to become the first director of Lumbee River Legal Services, a new legal aid organization headquartered in Pembroke and designed to serve the poor in Robeson and four surrounding counties. He worked in that capacity for ten years. In 1981, he served as counsel for residents suing the Lumberton City School Board, arguing that the system's annexations of mostly-white jurisdictions in the county in the 1960s violated the Voting Rights Act of 1965. The United States District Court for the Eastern District of North Carolina ultimately ruled that the city board had to seek clearance of its action from the U.S. Department of Justice.

Pierce also heavily studied laws concerning federal recognition of Native American tribes. The Lumbee were the largest group of resident Native Americans in the United States east of the Mississippi River. While they had been recognized by North Carolina's state government as tribal community since the 1880s, they never achieved complete federal recognition. In 1987 Pierce and three others co-authored a petition on behalf of Lumbee River Legal Services and the Lumbee Regional Development Association to request that the United States Department of the Interior grant federal recognition of the Lumbee people as a tribe. The petition was denied due to language in the Lumbee Act of 1956. The petitioners then proposed a recognition bill for Congress to adopt, but it failed due to opposition from the Department of the Interior and from other recognized tribes.

=== Judicial candidacy ===
In 1987, the North Carolina General Assembly created nine new Superior Court judgeships, including one covering Robeson County with the goal of allowing minority candidates better odds of winning judicial office. Joe Freeman Britt, the county's white district attorney, declared himself a candidate for the office in the 1988 Democratic primary. Britt was known for pushing for death sentences in criminal trials. No Republicans entered the contest. Pierce announced in January 1988 that he would run against Britt in the primary, making him the first person to ever challenge the district attorney in an electoral contest. He resigned from his position at Lumber River Legal Services and organized a campaign, pledging to be a "hard but fair judge". He also indicated that he would investigate allegations that Sheriff Hubert Stone was engaged in a protection racket with drug dealers and that Britt had engaged in prosecutorial abuses. Stone tried to convince Pierce to drop out of the contest. He said in a 1989 interview, "I approached him and asked him not to run for Superior Court Judge, and asked him to run for [a lesser office]. I said, 'Joe Freeman Britt is going to run, and I'd rather not have a fight in an election over it.'" Pierce refused, and over the course of February and March, it was alleged that Stone attempted to employ bribery and blackmail against Pierce.

Pierce's campaign workers feared for his safety. At a political dinner on March 24, 1988, Stone took Pierce aside to discuss the campaign. According to Stone, "[Pierce] said, 'I know you and Joe [Freeman Britt] are working on me.' And I said, 'I'm not going to hurt you.'" Pierce was reportedly angered by the encounter and stated that from then on he would focus on mobilizing black and Indian voters. The following day, a campaign worker told him that sheriff's deputies were spying on him and his campaign manager urged him to retain a bodyguard. Pierce declined to do so, explaining, "If it happens then it happens—they can kill me but they can't eat me."

== Murder ==
On the morning of March 26, 1988, just a few weeks before the election, Pierce's body was found in his home in Wakulla by his cousins with shotgun wounds to his head, chest, and stomach. Police, including state investigators and Stone, came to Pierce's home to investigate the murder. There were no signs of forced entry or theft. A crowd of approximately 200 Lumbee gathered at the scene and Stone asked for their help in providing information about the killing. He also told a reporter that the killing appeared to be a political assassination. A few days later, he announced that investigators had concluded that Pierce was killed by Johnny Goins with the assistance of Sandy Chavis. According to Stone, Goins shot Pierce because Pierce's girlfriend had told Goins to stay away from her daughter whom Goins had previously dated. Goins' blood and fingerprints were found at Pierce's home. Chavis was arrested and charged with murder, while Goins was found dead from an apparently self-inflicted shotgun wound to the head in his father's house. Investigators quickly declared Goins' death a suicide, and Stone said he had probably killed himself to avoid being arrested, re-iterating that Pierce's murder was due to a personal dispute and not political.

Pierce's family and many members of the Lumbee community doubted the investigators' conclusions. Pierce's briefcase, which had reportedly contained documents corroborating corruption claims in county government, had gone missing, as had the sheriff's office dispatch tapes from the night of March 25/26. Goins' autopsy mentioned that he had written a confessional suicide note, but law enforcement officials never produced it. A bloody footprint found in Pierce's house did not match Goins or Chavis. As for Goins, the state medical examiner and state investigators disagreed on whether he shot himself through the mouth or the side of the head. No gunshot residue was found on his hands and the autopsy did not conclude that he had fired the gun himself. A crime scene photo also showed that the shotgun used to shoot Goins was laying in his lap with its breech open. When asked about this in 1989, Stone maintained that the shotgun was found with its breech closed. When asked if he thought Goins killed Pierce, Stone refused to comment, citing Chavis' impending trial. In 1990 Chavis' murder trial was canceled after key witnesses for the prosecution refused to testify, and Chavis entered an Alford plea to accessory to murder after the fact. Circumstances surrounding the murder of Pierce remain contested, and members of his family and elected officials have in the years since his death questioned the investigation.

== Legacy ==
Pierce was buried in Hoke County near his parents' graves. A funeral for him was held at Pembroke State University and attended by 1,700 people, including the governor, the chief justice of the North Carolina State Supreme Court, and several other state officials. In the aftermath of the murder, a local civil rights march in Lumberton scheduled for April 4 to commemorate the assassination of Martin Luther King Jr. was reoriented around honoring Pierce. Speakers at the event encouraged attendees to vote for Pierce in the judgeship election despite his death. Britt was automatically declared the winner of the primary election. However, some reporters and campaign workers counted the votes and determined that Pierce actually won the vote posthumously, 10,787 to 8,231. To bring more racial balance to the court system, the General Assembly created another judgeship in the county and the governor appointed Lumbee attorney Dexter Brooks, a friend of Pierce, to the post.

Lumbee River Legal Services posthumously dedicated its law library room to Pierce and commissioned a portrait of him to be hung there. A scholarship for law students at North Carolina Central University was established in Pierce's honor in 2003. That year the National Legal Aid & Defender Association created the Pierce-Hickerson Award in honor of Pierce and Robert Hickerson to be given to lawyers who perform excellent legal work on behalf of Native Americans. In June 2015, the North Carolina House of Representatives passed a unanimous resolution in commemoration of Pierce.

== Works cited ==
- Blu, Karen I. (2001). The Lumbee Problem: The Making of an American Indian People (reprint ed.). Lincoln: University of Nebraska Press. ISBN 978-0-8032-6197-6.
- Lowery, Malinda Maynor (2018). The Lumbee Indians: An American Struggle. Chapel Hill: UNC Press Books. ISBN 9781469646381.
