= Joe Freeman Britt =

American lawyer

District Attorney of Robeson County, North Carolina
- In office 1974 – December 6, 1988

Personal details
- Born: Joe Freeman Britt; July 23, 1935 Lumberton, North Carolina, U.S.
- Died: April 6, 2016 (aged 80) Lumberton, North Carolina, U.S.
- Party: Democrat

Joe Freeman Britt (July 23, 1935 – April 6, 2016) was an American attorney and judge who developed a national reputation as a tough prosecutor, and for successfully pursuing a large number of death penalty convictions. He was also well known by the judicial system for accusations of misconduct, including Brady violations, i.e. hiding or failing to disclose potentially exculpatory evidence from the defence, in approximately one third of his cases.

Described as "towering" (he stood 6'6") and with a flamboyant courtroom presence, the Guinness Book of World Records lists Britt as the "deadliest prosecutor in America", with 47 death row convictions to his name as of 1988.

== Early life ==
Joe Freeman Britt was born on July 22, 1935 in Lumberton, North Carolina. His father was a lawyer. He earned a bachelor's degree in English from Wake Forest College, a master's degree in economics at the University of Tennessee, and a law degree from Stetson University in 1962. In 1968 he married Marylyn Linkhaw, the daughter of a successful farmer.

== Career ==
=== District attorney ===
In 1974 Britt was appointed district attorney for Robeson and Scotland counties by Governor James Holshouser to fill a vacancy created by the death of his predecessor, John Regan. He shortly thereafter won election to the office. During the previous 27 years, no one in the two counties had been sentenced to death. After just one year on the job, Britt had won more death-row convictions than any other prosecutor in the country. Numerous accusations and instances of judicial misconduct were later levied against Britt. In 1978 The Guinness Book of Records dubbed Britt the world's "deadliest prosecutor" for obtaining 23 death sentences in court in 28 months.

Britt left the attorney's office on December 6, 1988. Over the course of his tenure, he secured 38 death sentences.

==== Wrongful convictions of Leon Brown and Henry Lee McCollum ====
Among the cases he prosecuted were those of Leon Brown and Henry Lee McCollum, illiterate African American teenagers with very low IQs; the younger boy was only 15 years old. They were convicted in North Carolina of the 1983 rape and murder of 11-year-old Sabrina Buie. Their convictions rested heavily on confessions coerced from and scripted for them over five hours of intense questioning by detectives, in the absence of attorneys. They soon recanted them.

Police failed to turn over to the brothers' defense and denied the existence of retained physical exculpatory evidence for 30 years. The convictions were overturned after DNA evidence implicated then-convicted sex offender Roscoe Artis, who was found guilty of a similar murder he perpetrated in the same neighborhood less than a month after the Buie killing. Both brothers were originally sentenced to death but were released after 30 years in prison. Even in the light of the scientific evidence, Britt refused to acknowledge the men's innocence.

Britt's multiple oversights in the case raised the question of whether he was negligent in his prosecutions of Brown and McCollum, or even whether he intentionally overlooked evidence that could have exonerated them (especially since Britt had requested that a fingerprint comparison test between Artis and prints found at the crime scene be cancelled after the trial had concluded). A September 2014 story by The Charlotte Observer revealed that Britt's enthusiastic prosecution of Brown and McCollum overlooked glaring evidence that implicated Artis. First, Britt himself had convicted Artis for a similar crime just one month before McCollum and Brown went to trial. Second, Artis lived next to the field where Buie's body was found. Third, Artis also faced a warrant for the 1980 rape and murder of a woman in Gastonia, North Carolina.

In 2015, with the two convicts released by the court due to the DNA analysis, Britt still opposed a pardon and compensation for wrongful imprisonment of the two. Governor Pat McCrory had also not acted on the pardon and compensation six months after the release.

On June 4, 2015, nine months after their release, McCrory issued a formal pardon to Brown and McCollum. McCrory said "it's the right thing to do". The brothers were therefore able to seek compensation for false imprisonment.

In 2021, the brothers were awarded $62 million in compensatory damages (one million for each year served incarcerated), as well as $13 million in punitive damages.

=== Judicial election and opponent's murder ===
In 1987, the North Carolina General Assembly created nine new Superior Court judgeships, including one covering Robeson County, with the goal of allowing minority candidates better odds of winning judicial office. Britt was the first to announce his candidacy in the Democratic primary, declaring himself as a candidate in the 16-B Judicial District on January 4, 1988. Seeing an opportunity to be the first Native American superior court judge in North Carolina, Lumbee attorney Julian Pierce resigned from his position as director of Lumbee River Legal Services and entered the race as Britt's opponent.

On March 26, 1988, just a few weeks before the election, Pierce's body was found in his home with shotgun wounds to his head, chest, and stomach. Though local law enforcement claimed they had located the murderer, who committed suicide prior to an arrest or trial taking place, the reasons for the murder continue to be debated.

In the aftermath, Britt was automatically declared the winner of the primary election. However, some reporters and campaign workers counted the votes and determined that Pierce actually won the vote posthumously, 10,787 to 8,231. He faced no general election opposition from Republicans.

== Later life ==
Britt died on April 6, 2016, in Lumberton at the age of 80.

== Works cited ==
- Ahearn, Lorraine (2016). Narrative paths of Native American resistance: Tracing agency and commemoration in journalism texts in eastern North Carolina, 1872–1988 (PhD thesis). University of North Carolina at Chapel Hill. OCLC 1105761379.
