= North Carolina State Bureau of Investigation =

US state-level law enforcement agency

Agency overview
- Formed: 1937; 89 years ago
- Jurisdiction: North Carolina
- Headquarters: Raleigh, North Carolina
- Employees: 574
- Agency executives: Roger "Chip" Hawley, Director; Michael Culbertson, Deputy Director; Steven Holmes, Assistant Director; Kevin Tabron, Assistant Director; Kelly Page, Assistant Director; Kellie Hodges, Assistant Director; Ernest Darroch, Assistant Director; Eric Frey, Assistant Director
- Website: ncsbi.gov

The North Carolina State Bureau of Investigation (SBI) is the lead state-level law enforcement agency in North Carolina.

== Background ==
The SBI provides investigative assistance to local law enforcement agencies when requested by police, sheriffs, district attorneys, or judges. The agency has original jurisdiction in areas such as drug and arson investigations, election law violations, weapons of mass destruction, gambling, alcohol violations, child sexual abuse in daycare centers, computer crimes against children, crimes involving state property, and overseeing boxing regulations. SBI and Alcohol Law Enforcement agents conduct investigations to suppress organized crime and vice activities.

The SBI responds to illegal drug laboratories such as meth labs. The Diversion and Environmental Crime Unit investigates the diversion of prescription drugs by licensed healthcare professionals and the theft of medication from hospitals, pharmacies and medical facilities. This unit also investigates violations of state and federal environmental laws such as the Clean Water Act and the Clean Air Act. The SBI helps sponsor Operation Medicine Drop.

The SBI's Computer Crimes Unit helps solve sophisticated crimes involving digital evidence, particularly crimes involving child sex exploitation. The unit receives several thousand tips each year from the National Center for Missing and Exploited Children. The SBI is the lead agency in the N.C. Internet Crimes Against Children Task Force which includes 160 law enforcement agencies from across the state.

The Financial Crime Investigations Unit conducts investigations involving complex crimes such as embezzlement, false pretense and corporate malfeasance, elder financial abuse and other related crimes. The unit is heavily involved in political corruption investigations when a financial motive is involved. The Financial Crimes Unit also helps locate possible financial motives for homicide and arson investigations.

The Fire and Arson Investigation Unit works with local, state and federal investigators to determine the origin and cause of a fire. The SBI has original jurisdiction in fire and arson cases.

The SBI's Tactical Services Unit responds to hostage situations, barricaded suspects, high risk search warrants and arrests, explosive devices and high-level security events. The SBI Bomb Squad routinely responds to improvised explosive devices (IEDs), weapons of mass destruction (WMDs), suspicious packages, explosive disposals, booby traps, as well as other high hazard incidents. A part of Tactical Services, the Criminal Apprehension Program locates hard-to-find fugitives, homicide and drug trafficking suspects and missing or endangered persons at the request of local, state and federal law enforcement agencies. Tactical Services also has a Crisis Negotiation Team to peacefully resolve situations such as barricaded subjects or hostage takers. The Special Response Team responds to hostage rescues, barricaded felons, dignitary protection, meth labs and high risk arrests. Technical Services provides expertise in audio, video and other surveillance to law enforcement agencies in criminal investigations.

The SBI's Professional Standards Division conducts the most sensitive investigations involving public corruption and government misconduct. This division also oversees investigations into potential fraud cases regarding the Social Security Administration's disability programs, fraud committed by Medicaid health care providers and the physical abuse of patients in the Medicaid-funded facilities.

The North Carolina State Bureau of Investigation maintains the North Carolina Sex Offender Registry.

The Crime Reporting Unit is responsible for the collection of data from law enforcement agencies across North Carolina.

In 2018, the SBI received its seventh re-accreditation from the Commission on Accreditation for Law Enforcement Agencies.

== History ==
=== Early ===
In 1925 the North Carolina General Assembly created the State Bureau of Identification. At the time it was attached to the newly formed Department of Correction. The deputy warden H. H. Honeycutt was designated as the director of the new Bureau. A fingerprint laboratory, along with the office space for the Bureau, was located on prison ground. The funding for the bureau would come from appropriations made to the prison system. The bureau's main responsibility was to keep track of police and criminal records within the state and to receive and send information to other states. The bureau also conducted studies on the records they received.

The General Assembly 1937 passed legislation that established the State Bureau of Identification and Investigation (SBII) which was directly overseen by the governor. To finance the bureau, every criminal case finally disposed of in the courts had a $1 additional cost assessed and paid to the State Treasurer of North Carolina. One-half of this amount was to be allotted to the bureau. In 1942 SBI Director Fred C. Handy wrote this the following in The News & Observer about the early months for the agency.

One year after the passage of the act, on March 15, 1938, the governor Clyde R. Hoey appointed a director with authority to proceed with the creation and operation of the bureau... On July 1, 1938, the first special agent was appointed, and during the same month a firearms identification and questioned document expert entered the services of the bureau. On Aug. 15, 1938, the first fingerprint expert was employed. Necessary scientific equipment for the bureau was secured during the following months and made ready for service to the enforcement agencies of the state...

Two years later in 1939 the legislature authorized the North Carolina Department of Justice, transferring the (SBII) responsibilities, materials, and funds into the department. In the following decades, the General Assembly passed and enacted several laws giving new roles to the Bureau, which included authorizing private detectives within the state, and investigating arson and damage to, theft of, or misuse of state-owned property.

In 1940, the SBI purchased its first polygraph (lie detector machine). Two agents were in charge of firearms, documents, polygraph and identification.

In 1969, the Police Information Network was created as a central computerized network of criminal justice information.

=== Since 1970 ===
On November 3, 1970, the people of North Carolina voted on seven proposed amendments to the North Carolina Constitution. Six were approved, including one that required the legislature to reduce the number of administrative departments within the state government, which totaled more than 300 at the time.

The legislature established the North Carolina Department of Justice, placing it under direction of the state's Attorney General. The states Crime lab and the SBI were also placed under the control of the Attorney General. During the following years, the state attorney general gave more responsibility to the SBI. The State Bureau now performs background checks of nominees needing confirmation for appointment by the General Assembly. They take charge in cases regarding the investigation of suspected child abuse.

In 2006, the N.C. Information Sharing and Analysis Center, ISAAC, opened in Raleigh.

In 2014 the governor signed a budget bill by the legislature that also removed SBI from the Department of Justice, under the State Attorney General, and transferred it to the Department of Public Safety. Operationally SBI is now headed by an appointee of the governor who is confirmed to an eight-year term by the legislature. B.W. Collier was the first director, and Bob Schurmeier became the second director in July 2016.

=== Move to Department of Public Safety (2014) ===
In August 2014, the North Carolina legislature removed the SBI from the Department of Justice, and Governor Pat McCrory signed the 2014-15 budget bill. That bill, moved the SBI to the North Carolina Department of Public Safety for administrative purposes (i.e. human resources, payroll, etc.), and the State Crime Lab remained under the Department of Justice. For operational and investigative purposes, the SBI serves as an independent agency that reports directly to the governor. Under that 2014 legislation, the director of the SBI is appointed by the governor to an eight-year term, subject to legislative confirmation.

B.W. Collier was the first director under this new law, and Bob Schurmeier became the second director in July 2016.

In August 2014, State Attorney General Cooper was the likely Democratic nominee for the upcoming gubernatorial race. Some commentators suggested that the Republican action to move the SBI was politically motivated. Neither Governor McCrory nor Attorney General Cooper referred to this publicly.

Cooper said that this action could reduce the SBI's independence in cases where it had to investigate the executive branch, other state departments, and members of the General Assembly. "When a U.S. Attorney or a prosecutor calls on the SBI, they want them to be an independent agency that can help find the truth," Cooper said while talking to the Charlotte Observer in March 2014. Under Cooper, SBI agents helped make a criminal case against former Democratic Gov. Mike Easley and against aides of Gov. Bev Perdue, also a former Democratic governor of North Carolina. According to Cooper, when the legislature and Gov. McCrory moved the agency, the SBI was conducting investigations that related to legislators and the Department of Public Safety.

Gov. McCrory said that the State Bureau of Investigation should be completely nonpartisan. He suggested that no elected politician should directly oversee the department; rather it should be headed by a director, to be appointed to an eight-year term by the governor, in an effort to buffer the office from changes in administrations. "Wherever you put the SBI, there could be potential conflicts of interest, I think the goal is to keep the politics out of all investigating and as mayor and a governor we have done that," the governor said in an interview with the Charlotte Observer in March 2014.

B.W. Collier II was the first SBI director appointed and confirmed under the 2014 law. The second director, a former deputy chief of investigations for the Charlotte-Mecklenburg Police Department, Bob Schurmeier, was appointed and took office in 2016.

In December of 2023, under the direction of the North Carolina General Assembly the SBI left the Department of Public Safety and became an independent cabinet level agency.

== Activities ==
The SBI assists local law enforcement with criminal investigations. They work closely with local police, sheriffs, and district attorneys, as well as federal investigators and federal prosecutors.

The SBI has statewide jurisdiction and assists in criminal cases at the request of the local department (municipal police department or sheriff's office), district attorney, or judges, usually for serious cases such as homicide, robbery, and property crimes. The local department maintains original jurisdiction over these cases. The SBI has original jurisdiction in cases involving drug investigations, lynching, arson investigations, election law violations, child sexual abuse in day care centers, theft and misuse of state property, and computer crime investigations that involve crimes against children. The SBI is also charged with investigating organized crime and vice activities.

== Organization and districts ==
SBI headquarters is located in Wake County. The bureau has several divisions:

- Field Operations Division: Conducts most of the SBI's criminal investigations. More than 200 field agents and clerical personnel are employees in the Field Operations Division. Eastern District includes specialized investigators working in the Diversion and Environmental Crime Unit, Computer Crimes and financial crimes. Western District includes specialized investigators working clandestine lab cases, the Tactical Services Unit, the Air Wing, and arson, polygraph, and crime scene search.
- Professional Standards Division: Conducts sensitive investigations involving public corruption and government misconduct, investigations for the North Carolina Judicial Standards Commission, and cases involving theft and misuse of state property, Medicaid fraud and SBI internal affairs activities. It also oversees the agency's accreditation process.
- Support Services Division: Oversees recruitment and training of SBI agents and analysts and conducts work on budget, purchasing and physical security.
- Human Resources

The eight districts within the Field Operations Division are:

- Capital District is based in Raleigh and serves Chatham, Durham, Franklin, Granville, Harnett, Johnston, Orange, Person, Warren, Vance, and Wake counties.
- Coastal District is based in Jacksonville and serves Brunswick, Carteret, Columbus, Craven, Duplin, Jones, New Hanover, Onslow, Pamlico, and Pender counties.
- Northeastern District is based in Greenville and serves Beaufort, Bertie, Camden, Chowan, Currituck, Dare, Edgecombe, Gates, Greene, Halifax, Hertford, Hyde, Lenoir, Martin, Nash, Northampton, Pasquotank, Perquimans, Pitt, Tyrrell, Wayne, Wilson, and Washington counties.
- Northern Piedmont District is based in Greensboro and serves Alamance, Caswell, Davidson, Forsyth, Guilford, Montgomery, Randolph, Rockingham, and Stokes counties.
- Northwestern District is based in Hickory and serves Alexander, Alleghany, Ashe, Avery, Burke, Caldwell, Catawba, Davie, Iredell, Surry, Watauga, Wilkes, and Yadkin counties.
- Southeastern District is based in Fayetteville and serves Bladen, Cumberland, Hoke, Lee, Moore, Richmond, Robeson, Sampson, and Scotland counties.
- Southern Piedmont District is based in Harrisburg and serves Anson, Cabarrus, Cleveland, Gaston, Lincoln, Mecklenburg, Rowan, Stanly, and Union counties.
- Western District is based in Asheville and serves Buncombe, Cherokee, Clay, Graham, Haywood, Henderson, Jackson, Macon, Madison, McDowell, Mitchell, Polk, Rutherford, Swain, Transylvania, and Yancey counties.

== Line of duty deaths ==
As of 2025 1 SBI agent has been killed in the line of duty.
