= North Carolina Highway 710 =

State highway in Robeson County, North Carolina, US

North Carolina Highway 710

Route information
- Maintained by NCDOT
- Length: 20.4 mi (32.8 km)
- Existed: 1935–present

Major junctions
- West end: NC 211 in Red Springs
- US 74 Alt. near Pembroke; I-74 / US 74 near Pembroke
- East end: US 501 / NC 130 near Rowland

Location
- Country: United States
- State: North Carolina
- Counties: Robeson

Highway system
- North Carolina Highway System; Interstate; US; State; Scenic
← NC 705	→ NC 711

North Carolina Highway 710 (NC 710) is a primary state highway in the U.S. state of North Carolina. It connects the town of Pembroke to Interstate 74 (I-74) and U.S. Route 74 (US 74) and the nearby towns of Red Springs and Rowland.

== Route description ==
NC 710 is a predominantly two-lane rural highway in the southern section of the state. Though it traverses geographically north-south, it is signed east-west, with its western and eastern points also geographically incorrect. NC 710 begins at its signed western terminus in a concurrency with NC 72 in downtown Red Springs, at the intersection of Main and Fourth Streets. Heading south, it splits from NC 72, which continues on to Lumberton. NC 710 skirts the western edge of Pembroke, connecting with NC 711, which goes through the town and UNC Pembroke. Crossing the Lumber River, it connects with US 74 Alternate, which was the former main highway in the area. One and a half miles (2.4 km) further south is I-74/US 74, where travelers can continue towards Rockingham or Wilmington. Continuing south for eight miles (13 km), NC 710 ends at its signed eastern terminus at US 501/NC 130, northwest of Rowland.

== History ==
NC 710 was established in 1935 as a new primary routing from NC 211 in Red Springs, to US 501/NC 130 northwest of Rowland. It has changed little since inception.

== Junction list ==
The entire route is in Robeson County.

Location	mi	km	Destinations	Notes
Red Springs	0.0	0.0	NC 211 (Main Street / Fourth Street) / NC 72 ends – Lumberton, Raeford	West end of NC 72 overlap
	1.8	2.9	NC 72 east – Lumberton	East end of NC 72 overlap
Pembroke	9.7	15.6	NC 711 south – Pembroke	To UNC Pembroke; northern terminus of NC 711
	10.8	17.4	US 74 Alt. – Maxton, Lumberton	
	12.3	19.8	I-74 / US 74 – Rockingham, Wilmington	Exit 200 (I-74)
	20.4	32.8	US 501 / NC 130 – Rowland, Laurinburg	
1.000 mi = 1.609 km; 1.000 km = 0.621 mi: Concurrency terminus
