= Robeson County, North Carolina =

County in North Carolina, United States

- County
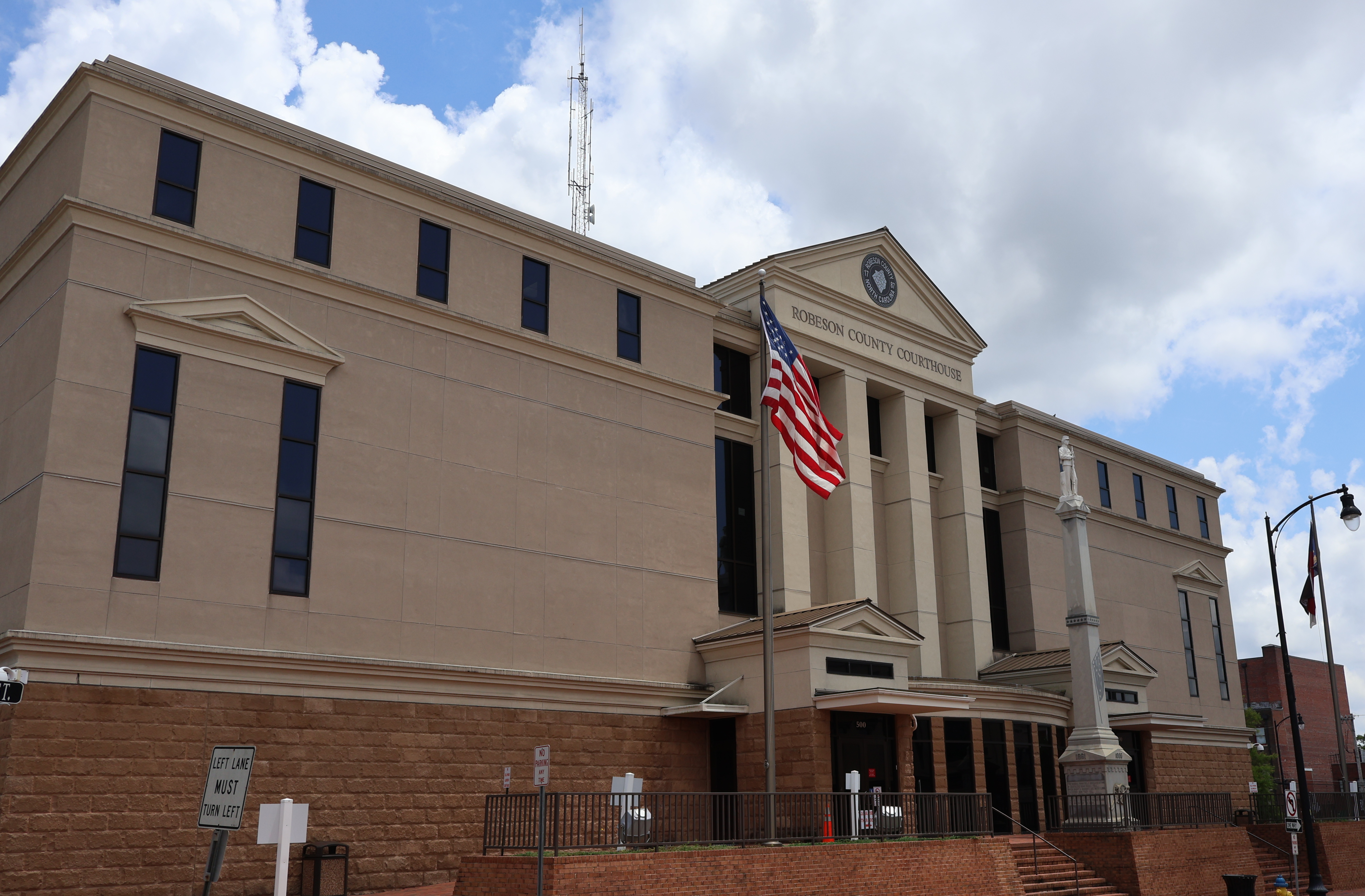
- Robeson County Courthouse and Confederate Monument in Lumberton

- Flag Seal

- Location within the U.S. state of North Carolina
- Coordinates: 34.64°N 79.10°W
- Country: United States
- State: North Carolina
- Founded: 1787
- Named for: Thomas Robeson
- Seat: Lumberton
- Largest community: Lumberton

Area
  - Total: 949.26 sq mi (2,458.6 km^{2})
  - Land: 947.30 sq mi (2,453.5 km^{2})
  - Water: 1.96 sq mi (5.1 km^{2}) 0.21%

Population (2020)
  - Total: 116,530
  - Estimate (2025): 119,941 ▲
  - Density: 123.01/sq mi (47.495/km^{2})
- Time zone: UTC−5 (Eastern)
  - Summer (DST): UTC−4 (EDT)
- Congressional districts: 7th, 8th
- Website: www.robesoncountync.gov

Robeson County (/ˈrɒbɪsən/ ROB-ih-sun) is a county in the southern part of the U.S. state of North Carolina and is its largest county by land area. Its county seat and largest community is Lumberton. The county was formed in 1787 from part of Bladen County and named in honor of Thomas Robeson, a colonel who had led Patriot forces in the area during the Revolutionary War. As of the 2020 census, the county's population was 116,530. It is a majority-minority county; its residents are approximately 38 percent Native American, 22 percent white, 22 percent black, and 10 percent Hispanic. It is included in the Fayetteville-Lumberton-Pinehurst, NC Combined Statistical Area. The federally-recognized Lumbee Tribe of North Carolina is headquartered in Pembroke.

The area eventually comprising Robeson was initially inhabited by Native Americans, though little is known about them. A Native community eventually coalesced around the swamps near Lumber River, which bisects the area. In the mid-18th century, Scottish, English, French, and free black settlers occupied the county. The population remained sparse for decades due to the lack of suitable land for farming, and timber and naval stores formed a crucial part of the early economy. The proliferation of the cotton gin and rising demand for cotton led Robeson County to become one of the state's major cotton-producing counties throughout the 1800s. The Lowry War was fought between a group of mostly-Native American outlaws and local authorities during the latter stages of the American Civil War and through the Reconstruction era. After Reconstruction ended, a unique system of tripartite racial segregation was instituted in the county to separate whites, blacks, and Native Americans.

In the early 20th century, Robeson developed significant tobacco and textile industries while many of its swamp lands were drained and roads were paved. From the 1950s to the 1970s, the county experienced tensions over racial desegregation. During the same period, local agriculture mechanized, and the manufacturing industry grew. The new sector was unable to provide stable enough employment to locals, and by the 1980s, Robeson was heavily afflicted by cocaine trafficking. The narcotics trade fueled violence, social unrest, political tensions, and police corruption and caused the county's statewide reputation to suffer. The county's economy was further damaged by significant declines in the tobacco and textile industries in the 1990s and early 2000s, which have now been supplanted by the supply of fossil fuels, poultry farming, biogas and bio-mass facilities, and logging. Robeson continues to rank low on several statewide socioeconomic indicators.

== History ==
=== Early history and colonial era ===
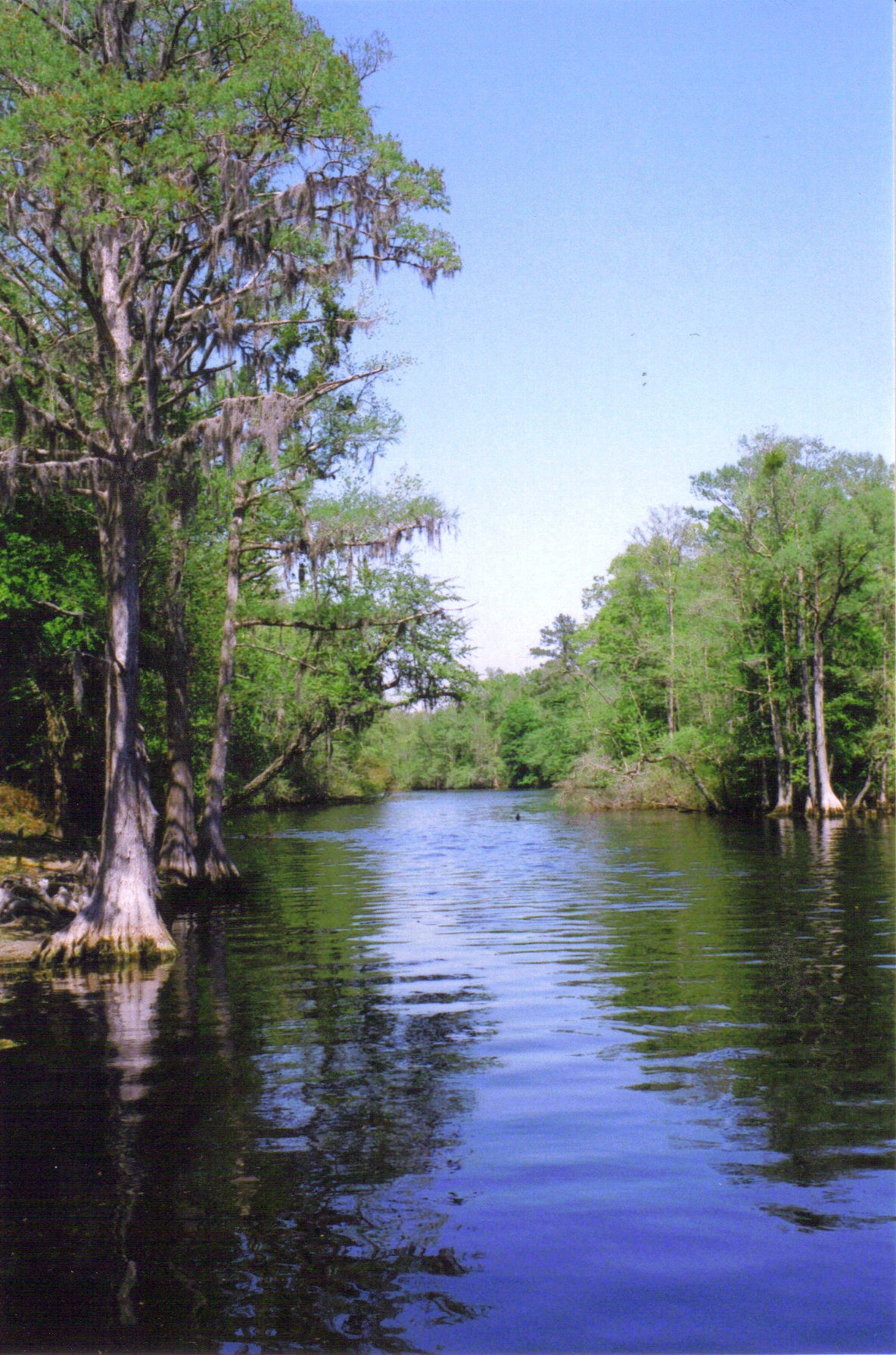
The Lumber River as seen from the boat launch at Princess Ann near Orrum.

Indigenous people have lived in the region as early as 20,000 BC, though little is known about those who lived there in the pre-colonial and early colonial eras. Archeological excavations in the area eventually encompassing Robeson County have uncovered glass beads—often used by Native Americans in trade, pottery, and clay pipes. Archeologist Stanley Knick concluded that the land had been inhabited continuously from 12,000 BC in the early Paleo-Indian period through the Archaic and Woodland periods and up to the present. The earliest written mention of Native Americans in the area is a 1725 map compiled by John Herbert, which identified tribes near Drowning Creek—later known as the Lumber River.

The Native American/American Indian-descent people (Note: There are various theories on the origins of this group. The descendants of this community have historically described themselves as "Indian" and been labeled as such in historical documents. However, younger generations in the 21st century often identify themselves as "Native American".) in the Lumber River valley eventually coalesced into a series of farming communities collectively dubbed "Scuffletown" by whites but known by inhabitants as "the Settlement". The date of Scuffletown's formation is unknown as was its actual location. Some scholars believe it was in the vicinity of the later town of Pembroke while others place it at Moss Neck. Historians Adolph Dial and David K. Eliades believed it was a mobile community. Others still believe the name applied broadly to any concentration of Indians in the area. Mary C. Noment, who wrote "The Lowry History," asserted that Robeson County had the largest free Black settlement in North Carolina, believing they were descended from runaway slaves, who were "free negros or mulattos", with one reporter referring to it as "The Mulatto Capital".

Culturally, the Scuffletonians were similar to other Europeans in their dress and style of homes. They were Protestant Christians and spoke English, though they spoke an "older form", which set them apart from later settlers. Not viewed as Native Americans by the state of North Carolina until the 1880s, these people were generally dubbed "mulattos" by locals and in federal documents throughout the mid-1800s to distinguish them from blacks. Genealogical and historical analysis shows many of their ancestors were free Black people in Virginia. The original Scuffletonians were joined by some whites and blacks in the mid-1700s, including some escaping enslavement. (Note: The true extent to which these people are actually of Native descent is sometimes disputed by some white and black Robesonians and some other indigenous groups, who assert that this community is really of mixed African and European ancestry.) The earliest written record of white settlement dates from 1747 land deed applications. Migrants from free black communities to the north were also settling in the county in the mid-1700s.

The area eventually comprising Robeson County was not heavily settled by whites until about ten years before the American Revolution, when Highland Scots moved into the area. They formed a separate community from the Scuffletonians. The immigrants encompassed a range of class distinctions, from literate and aristocratic English-speaking families to poorer Scottish Gaelic-speakers, many of whom were indentured servants. The latter were called "Buckskins" due to their reputation for wearing pants made of deer leather. Gaelic remained spoken in the area as late as the 1860s. English and a few French settlers moved into the eastern portion of the eventual county.

Despite the increase in settlement, population levels in the Lumber River valley remained low for many years, as swamps and thick vegetation divided arable land and made transportation difficult. The production of timber and naval stores formed a key part of the area's early economy, with logs being floated down the river for sale in Georgetown, South Carolina, in the late 1700s. During the American Revolutionary War, control over the Lumber River valley was heavily contested by British Loyalists and Patriots. Tensions raised by the war caused some whites to migrate out of the area, moving as far away as Canada.

=== Creation ===
Robeson County was created by the North Carolina General Assembly in 1787 out of a western section of Bladen County. It was named for Thomas Robeson, a colonel who had led Patriot forces in the area during the Revolutionary War. (Note: Some historians wrote that the county was named for Robeson, an influential political figure, in an attempt to get his support for its creation. He died in 1785 before the county was created.) General John Willis, owner of the Red Banks plantation, lobbied to have the county's new seat of government located on his land. The site, to be known as Lumberton, was chosen due to its central location in the county, proximity to a reliable ford of the Lumber River, and as it was where several roads intersected. The first county courthouse was a wooden residence sold by Willis, which was moved into place after the land was cleared.

Lumberton served as county residents' primary area of commerce for much of the area's early history, as transportation links with major regional cities elsewhere were tenuous. The 1790 United States census recorded 5,356 county residents, of whom five percent were free blacks. The county's first U.S. Post Office was established there by 1796. That year settlers moved up the Lumber River and established Robeson's second white community, Princess Anne. Much of the county's geography was not officially understood by surveyors until the early 1800s. The county's boundaries were modified and remarked several times between 1788 and 1832.

=== Antebellum ===
Initially, wheat, corn, rice, sugar cane, and potatoes were popular crops among Robesonian farmers. The proliferation of the cotton gin and rising demand for cotton led it to be rapidly adopted, and Robeson County became one of the state's major cotton-producing counties throughout much of the 1800s. Wealthy white planters held the best land in the county, and often outcompeted smallholding Indian and white farmers due to the aid of enslaved labor, creating stark class divisions. Cotton demand facilitated the growth of slavery and the expansion of plantations. By 1850, the county had a population of 7,290 whites, 4,365 enslaved people, and 1,171 free persons of color.

In 1835 a new Constitution of North Carolina was ratified, which restricted the ability of "free persons of color" and "free persons of mixed blood" to vote and bear arms. While having previously enjoyed the same political rights as white people, Native Americans were disenfranchised by the new constitution. White farmers in Robeson County also sought ways to obtain Native Americans' land or labor. According to Indian oral tradition, the "tied mule" incidents were emblematic of this. In these scenarios, a farmer would tie his mule to an Indian's land and release some of his cattle there before bringing local authorities to the scene to accuse the Indian landowner of theft. Doubtful of a fair trial in the courts, an Indian would settle with the farmer by offering him a portion of land or free labor. By the 1860s, many Indians were landless. The legal discrimination and exploitative practices heightened racial tensions in the area.

In 1848, a new county courthouse was constructed to replace the original building. Lumberton was formally incorporated four years later. In 1860, the Wilmington, Charlotte and Rutherford Railroad was laid through the county as its first railway. By April 1861, the line reached the town of Shoe Heel—later known as Maxton. The introduction of the railroad facilitated the creation of new towns in the county.

=== Civil War ===
North Carolina seceded from the United States in 1861 and joined the Confederate States of America to fight in the American Civil War. Many Indians and Buckskin whites were unenthusiastic about the war; most local supporters of the Confederate cause were wealthy or well-educated. Some Indian men enlisted in the Confederate States Army, though it is unknown whether they were accepted as recognized Indians or passed as white. Major white enslavers were exempted from service, as were those wealthy enough to pay for surrogates to serve in their place.

In 1863, Confederate authorities began conscripting the Indians and other free persons of color for labor along the coast, especially at Fort Fisher. The Indians were usually tasked to either construct batteries or grind salt. Most found the work dangerous and monotonous, and the conditions at the labor camps were poor. Many consequently fled into the swamps of Robeson County to avoid conscription. Though some Indians still sought to serve in the army during this time, by late 1863, most had concluded that the Confederacy was an oppressive regime. This change in attitudes was brought on by their contact with Union prisoner-of-war escapees from the Florence Stockade, 60 miles (97 km) away in South Carolina. Indians became increasingly willing to help the Union soldiers escape and avoid recapture.

As time progressed, some of the swamp deserters—including Indians, blacks, and Union soldiers—formed bands to raid and steal from area farms, though this was mostly out of a desire to survive and had little to do with challenging the Confederacy. The Indians' aid to the Union escapees and their attempts to dodge labor conscription drew the attention of the Confederate Home Guard, a paramilitary force tasked with maintaining law and order in the South during the war. In early March 1865, Union troops led by General William Tecumseh Sherman entered North Carolina. The Union escapees left to join them, and the bands became predominantly Indian. Union forces entered Lumberton on March 9, burning two bridges and a depot. They also foraged off the locals' goods, seizing draft animals, cattle, and crops. The bulk of Confederate forces surrendered at Appomattox, Virginia shortly thereafter. On May 15, enslaved people in Robeson were declared emancipated.

=== Reconstruction and Lowry War ===
In 1864, during the latter stages of the Civil War, Confederate postmaster James P. Barnes accused some sons of Allen Lowry, a prominent Indian farmer, of stealing two of his hogs and butchering them to feed Union escapees. He ordered the Lowry family to stay off his land under threat of being shot. In December, Barnes was ambushed and shot as he made his way to work. Shortly before he succumbed to his wounds, he accused William and Henry Berry Lowry, two sons of Allen, of committing the attack. The following January, Confederate Home Guard officer James Brantly Harris was ambushed and shot following his involvement in the deaths of three Lowrys. Fearing Harris' death would lead to retaliation from the Home Guard, local Indians began preparing for violence. Short on food and weapons, they started stealing from white-owned farms and plantations. Supplies intended for the guard were stolen from the courthouse in Lumberton.

White citizens were infuriated by the decline in law and order, and the Home Guard suspected that the Lowry family was primarily responsible. On March 3, 1865, a Home Guard detachment arrested Allen Lowry and several others. Following an impromptu tribunal, the guardsmen executed Allen and his son William for allegedly possessing stolen goods. The Home Guard was briefly disrupted by the incursion of Sherman's troops several days later but resumed investigating the Lowry family thereafter. These events initiated the Lowry War, a conflict which dominated Robeson County throughout the Reconstruction period.

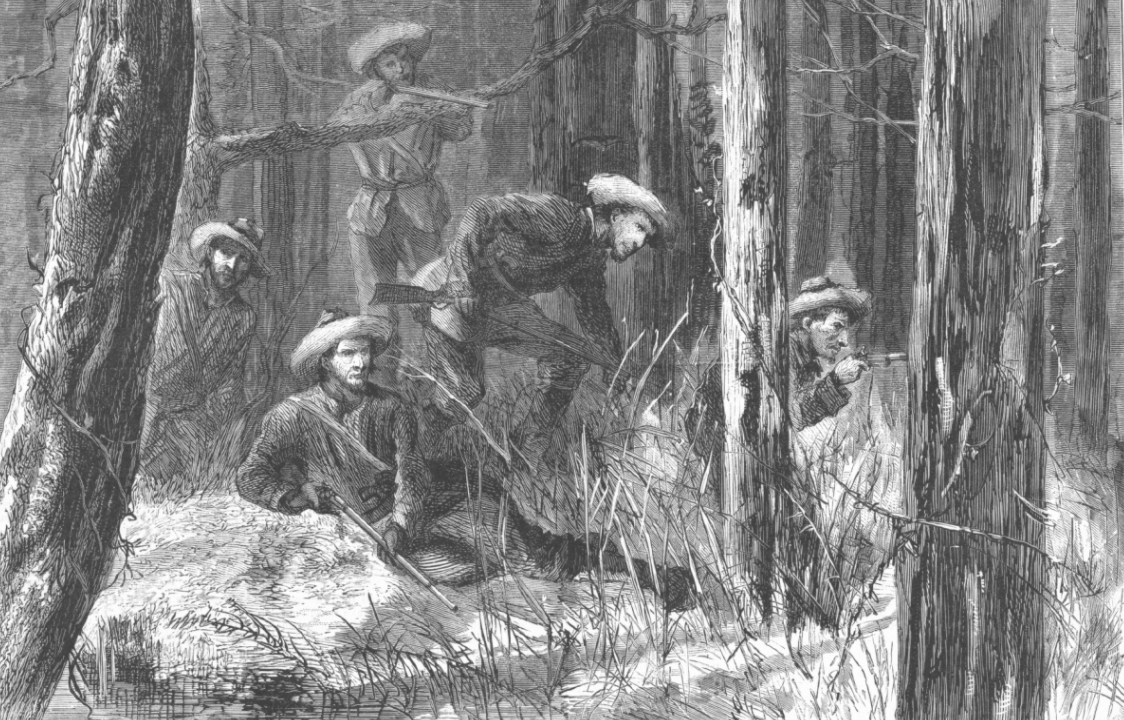
Artist's depiction of the Lowry Gang in a swamp from Harper's Weekly, 1872

The situation in Robeson County briefly calmed with the Union victory, as locals focused on rebuilding their livelihoods. The region suffered an economic downturn brought on by an agricultural depression and the destruction of the turpentine industry by Union troops. Some white Robesonians moved down the Lumber River into South Carolina in search of new farmland, while others moved west. Many black freedmen turned to tenant farming. Local government in Robeson mostly continued as it had during the war, with rich white men of prominence dominating public offices, especially the justices of the peace who constituted the county court. The Home Guard was formally dissolved but was replaced by a similar institution, the Police Guard.

In December, the Police Guard arrested Henry Berry Lowry at his wedding and held him on charges of murdering Barnes. He shortly thereafter escaped custody and avoided the authorities by hiding in swamps with a group of associates, which became known as the Lowry Gang. Although a somewhat fluid band at times numbering 20–30 men, the gang usually operated with six to eight men. The principle members were primarily relatives of Lowry, though the gang also included two blacks and a poor white. They usually stayed in improvised shelters in Back Swamp, a ten-mile-long stretch of sparsely-traveled land near Allen Lowry's homestead. Throughout 1866 and 1867, the gang conducted raids "in retaliation" for previous wrongs inflicted upon them, but no people were killed.

Following the passage of federal Reconstruction Acts in 1867 and the ratification of a new state constitution in North Carolina in 1868, nonwhites in Robeson, both black freedmen and Indians, were re-enfranchised. The Republican Party won a majority of the vote in elections in Robeson, displacing Conservative planter families who had dominated county affairs. The party relied on the electoral support of black freedmen, Indians, and poor Buckskin whites. Republican officials were reluctant to take any action concerning the lawlessness in Robeson since prosecuting former Home Guardsmen for their extrajudicial killings would harm their law and order campaign, while targeting the Lowry Gang would split their local base of support. Despite this, the new Republican Governor of North Carolina, William Woods Holden issued a declaration of outlawry against Lowry and some of his associates, dividing the local Republican Party and threatening their hold on county politics.

In an attempt to broker a solution, local Republicans convinced Lowry to surrender himself to be tried in the postwar court system, but he shortly thereafter escaped. The Lowry Gang then killed Reuben King, the former sheriff of the county, during a robbery in January 1869, ending all attempts by Reconstruction authorities to negotiate a settlement. The gang continued its raids. As a result, federal troops were dispatched to assist the local authorities. In February 1872, the Lowry Gang committed their largest heist, stealing two safes from downtown Lumberton. Shortly thereafter, Henry Berry Lowry disappeared. Over the next two years, bounty hunters tracked down the remaining gang members, and the war ended when the last active one was killed in February 1874.

=== End of Reconstruction and establishment of racial segregation ===
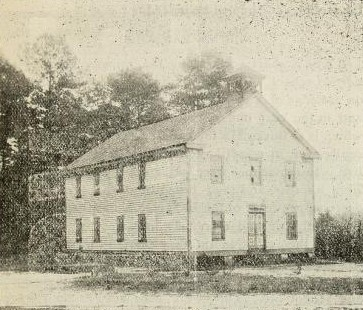
The first Croatan Normal School building in Pates

Dissatisfied with the 1868 Reconstruction constitution, Conservatives/Democrats (Note: The state Conservative Party officially changed its name in 1874 to align itself with the national Democratic Party.) pushed for a convention to be held in 1875 to revise the document. Elections to determine the delegates to attend were held in August. Early returns indicated that a Republican-majority convention was likely, and the final results from Robeson County were, depending on the outcome, likely to provide either party with their majority. The Democratic state chair telegrammed the local Democrat-dominated elections board, writing, "As you love the state, hold Robeson." The board then voted to certify the elections without counting results from four Republican-majority precincts, giving the county's two Democratic delegate candidates a slim margin of victory. With their narrow majority at the convention, the Democrats reversed many of the reforms instituted in the 1868 constitution, making it harder for Republicans and blacks to hold office.

With Reconstruction thus ended, Democrats reasserted their dominance over politics in the South, but Republicans remained competitive in North Carolina, and the Indian population in Robeson continued to support them. Though Republicans still made up the majority of registered voters in Robeson, disagreements caused by the Lowry War prevented them from solidifying local control. The Indians also resisted being treated the same as blacks under the new socio-political hierarchy, who were relegated to a subordinate position. Hamilton McMillan, a Robesonian member of the North Carolina House of Representatives and a Democrat, sought to switch the Indians' allegiance to solidify his party's control over the state. He convinced the General Assembly to formally recognize the Indians as "Croatoans"—arguing that they descended from English settlers of the Lost Colony who mixed with Croatan Indians.

In 1887, McMillan convinced the legislature to appropriate money to establish a Croatan Normal School to train teachers who could staff new Indian schools. As a result, most Robeson Indians began to vote for Democrats, and their voting rights were preserved when blacks were disenfranchised by constitutional amendment in 1900. This distinction birthed a system of tripartite segregation which was unique in the American South. However, whites generally regarded both the Indians and blacks as "colored". Indians and blacks nevertheless maintained separate identities. Some other county facilities were separated for "Whites", "Negroes", and "Indians", including the courthouse in Lumberton. Under this racial hierarchy, whites constituted the dominant racial caste, and blacks were socially subordinated, while the Indians formed a middle caste and, though retaining more privileges than blacks, were still subject to discrimination.

The county's second rail line was established in 1884 by the Cape Fear and Yadkin Valley Railway, connecting Lumber Bridge, Red Springs, and Maxton. In 1892, the Wilmington and Weldon Railroad built a north–south line through the county, intersecting with the Wilmington, Charlotte and Rutherford Railroad at the site of Campbell's Mill. A train station was subsequently built, and a strong trading community was established. It was incorporated in 1895 as the town of Pembroke, and in 1909, the Croatan Normal School was moved there from its original location in Pates. Pembroke became a center for Indian commercial activity. Due to the Indians' predominance in the community, the town lacked strict adherence to many Jim Crow norms common in the rest of the county and the wider South in the early-to-mid 20th century. St. Pauls and Red Springs developed as white-majority towns hostile to nonwhites, while the towns of Fairmont and Rowland retained significant black labor forces. In 1913 the General Assembly reclassified the Indians as Cherokees.

=== Economic development and Great Depression ===
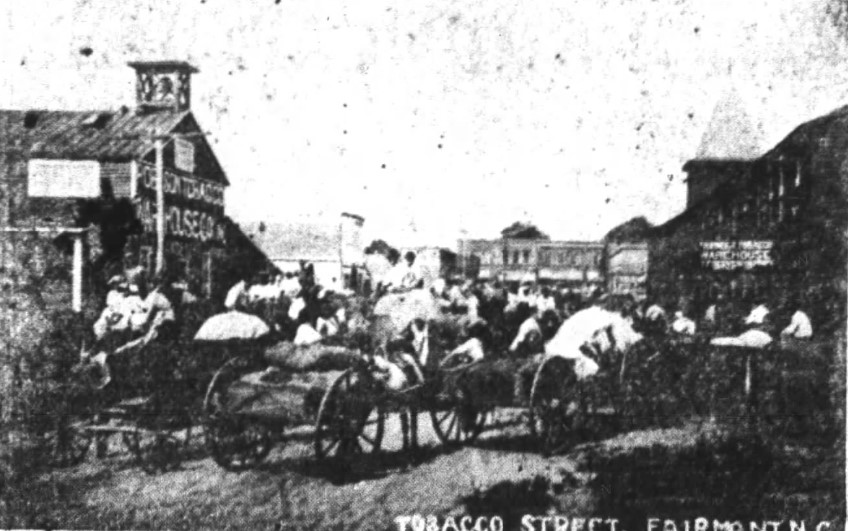
Farmers taking tobacco to market in Fairmont in the early 1900s

Following the stagnation of cotton prices in the 1890s, farmers in Robeson County began rapidly adopting tobacco as a regular crop. Many tobacco warehouses were built, and the town of Fairmont became the county's primary market town for the crop. Significant tobacco markets were also established in Rowland and Lumberton. The county's first cotton mill opened in 1897, and St. Pauls subsequently developed as the county's primary textile center. In the early 1900s, farmers organized a trade association and convinced the county government to appoint a local commissioner for agriculture.

In 1909, Robeson County's third courthouse was constructed. Two years later a portion of the county was split off and combined with a section of Cumberland County to form Hoke County. Bouts of typhoid, hookworm, smallpox, and a high infant mortality rate led Robeson's government to organize the first county-level public health department in the United States in 1912. Following the passage of a state drainage law in 1909, many swamps in the county were drained to increase usable farmland, improve transportation, and reduce malaria cases. Work on the drainage of the nearly 22,000-acre Back Swamp was completed in 1918. Most major roads in the county were paved with state support between the 1920s and 1947. In 1929, Robeson became the first county in the United States to appoint a county manager.

Like the rest of the country, local agriculture suffered throughout the 1920s following World War I due to decreased demand and limited crop market opportunities. The Great Depression led to a severe decline in tobacco prices. Area farmers responded by increasing their output, but the expanded agricultural supply only lowered crop prices. Robesonians dubbed the time period the "Hoover Days". In response to the downturn, in 1936, the federal government created Pembroke Farms, a resettlement community for struggling Indian farmers. In 1938, the government offered loans for the establishment of a second project, the Red Banks Mutual Association. The association served as a cooperative with multiple Indian households farming common land from which profits would be attained and then divided among the members. Neither project proved successful, and by the 1940s, both faced neglect from the government, though the mutual association persisted into the 1960s before it finally collapsed.

=== Civil rights and desegregation ===
Hundreds of Indians from Robeson County fought for the United States during World War II in white units (blacks were segregated into different outfits). Many returned with a willingness to pursue social change. Some of them, especially the war veterans, disliked Robeson County's segregation. In 1945, a group of Indians petitioned the governor to support the restoration of an elected municipal government in Pembroke, which had been swapped for an appointive system in 1917 at the behest of the community's white minority. In 1947, the town returned to an elected government, and Pembroke chose its first Indian mayor. Other Indian leaders lobbied to adopt a unique name to identify their group.

In 1952, the name Lumbee, inspired by the Lumbee/Lumber River, was approved by the Indians in a referendum, and the following year, the General Assembly formally recognized the label. In 1956, the United States Congress formally extended partial recognition to the Lumbee Tribe, affirming their existence as an Indigenous community but disallowing them from the use of federal funds and services available to other Native American groups. Other Indians rejected the Lumbee designation and identified themselves as Tuscarora—stressing a connection to the Tuscarora people who had populated North Carolina in the 1700s—intending to secure a better chance at full federal recognition.

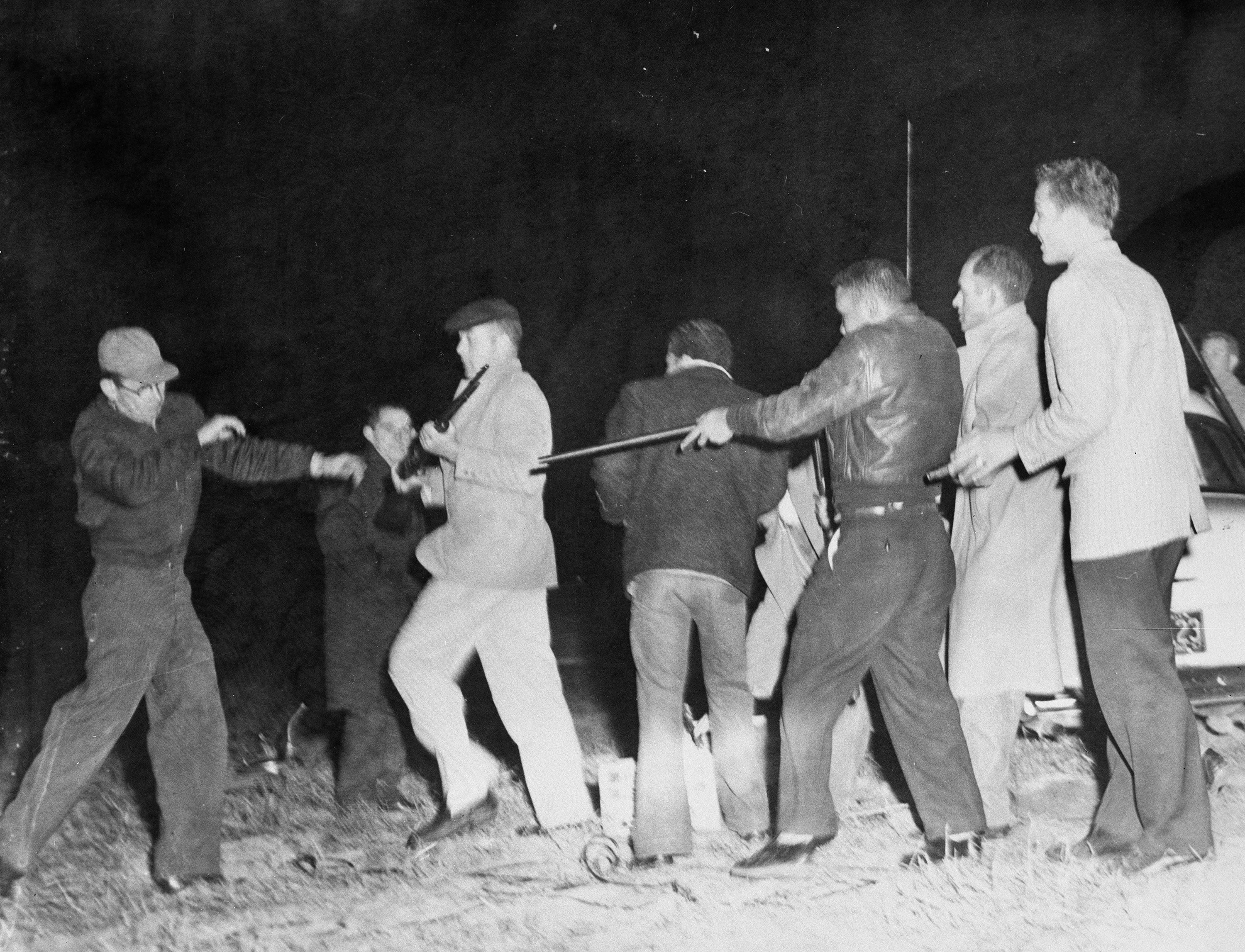
Lumbee Indians fighting Ku Klux Klansmen during the Battle of Hayes Pond, 1958

In 1954, the United States Supreme Court issued its decision in Brown v. Board of Education, ruling that racial segregation in public schools was unconstitutional. The ruling sparked a significant amount of pro-segregation activity among whites in the South, including a resurgence in white supremacist Ku Klux Klan (KKK) activity. Klan activity and violence increased in Robeson in the early 1950s before being suppressed under pressure from the district solicitor and the federal government.

In early 1958, Klan leader James W. "Catfish" Cole of South Carolina attempted to revive the Klan in Robeson County. His group burned crosses in St. Pauls and Lumberton to intimidate the Lumbee community before advertising a rally to be held at Hayes Pond, near Maxton. The rally was held on the evening of January 18, attended by about 50 Klansmen—most not from the county, and joined by several hundred armed Lumbees. The Lumbees opened fire, inflicting minor injuries and causing the Klansmen to disperse. The event, dubbed by the press as the "Battle of Hayes Pond", garnered national media attention and led Klan activity against the Lumbees to cease.

Pembroke State College, formerly the Croatan Normal School, was racially integrated in the 1950s and 1960s. After 1965, the rate of black and Native American voter registration substantially increased. By 1968, black and Native voters outnumbered whites. In 1970, the federal government ordered the county school board to integrate its institutions. The board responded by dissolving special Native American districts and consolidating Native students with black and white schools. This did not affect most white students in the county, who were largely served by independent municipal school districts. Feeling a loss of control over their traditional schools, many Lumbees and Tuscaroras protested integration and resisted the assignment of black staff and white and black students to their institutions.

In early 1973, dozens of buildings in the county, most of them owned by whites, were set ablaze. In March, Old Main, a historic building on Pembroke State's campus, which had symbolic importance to the Native American community, was burned. In 1974, a federal court ruled that the "double voting" system used by the county school board, whereby both county residents and municipal residents could vote for board members—despite the latter not being served by the county school system, was unconstitutional. Following a bitter 1986 referendum which received national attention, the municipal systems were merged with the county system in 1988.

Pembroke State College was elevated to university in 1971 and was grouped under the University of North Carolina System the following year. In 1974 the county courthouse was demolished. It was replaced with a new structure in 1976.

=== Drug trafficking and economic stagnation ===
Robeson County became one of the top moonshine-producing counties in North Carolina in the 20th century. The prevalence of poverty enticed many Robesonians to sell moonshine to supplement their incomes, and the large number of isolated swamps and woods offered many places where stills could be concealed. Many Lumbees and Tuscaroras produced moonshine into the 1970s. The trade of marijuana eventually supplanted moonshine before being overtaken by cocaine trafficking in the 1980s, which was enabled by the county's midway location between Miami and New York City along Interstate 95. The drug trade was fueled by worsening economic prospects in the region which began with the 1970s energy crisis and increased living costs.

By the mid-1980s, local agriculture was in decline. Reliance upon mechanized agriculture and the consolidation of smallholding farms into larger corporate operations led to the loss of work for many farmers and their laborers. Newer manufacturing jobs did not provide residents sufficient employment and stability to make up for the shift. Over a quarter of county residents lived below the poverty threshold, over half of adults over the age of 25 lacked a high school diploma, and the local unemployment rate was higher than the state average.

Native Americans and blacks suffered disproportionately from the lack of prosperity, and many Native Americans partook in the drug trade. Narcotics-related activities led to murders and stoked social unrest, political tensions, and police corruption. Robeson's homicide rate grew to four times worse than the national average and the county had the highest numbers of drug-related arrests in the state in 1985 and 1986. In February 1988, two Tuscaroras held the staff of the county newspaper, The Robesonian, hostage to protest local corruption. In March, Lumbee judicial candidate Julian Pierce was murdered under disputed circumstances, and the father of basketball player Michael Jordan was murdered in Robeson in 1993. The county's reputation among North Carolinians suffered due to these events. Political action motivated by discontent led to an increasing number of blacks and Native Americans to run for office. In 2002, the North Carolina State Bureau of Investigation opened an inquiry into corruption allegations in the Robeson County Sheriff's Office. Their subsequent Operation Tarnished Badge became the largest police corruption investigation in state history and led to 22 officers, including the sheriff, being convicted for various crimes.

=== Deindustrialization and hurricanes ===
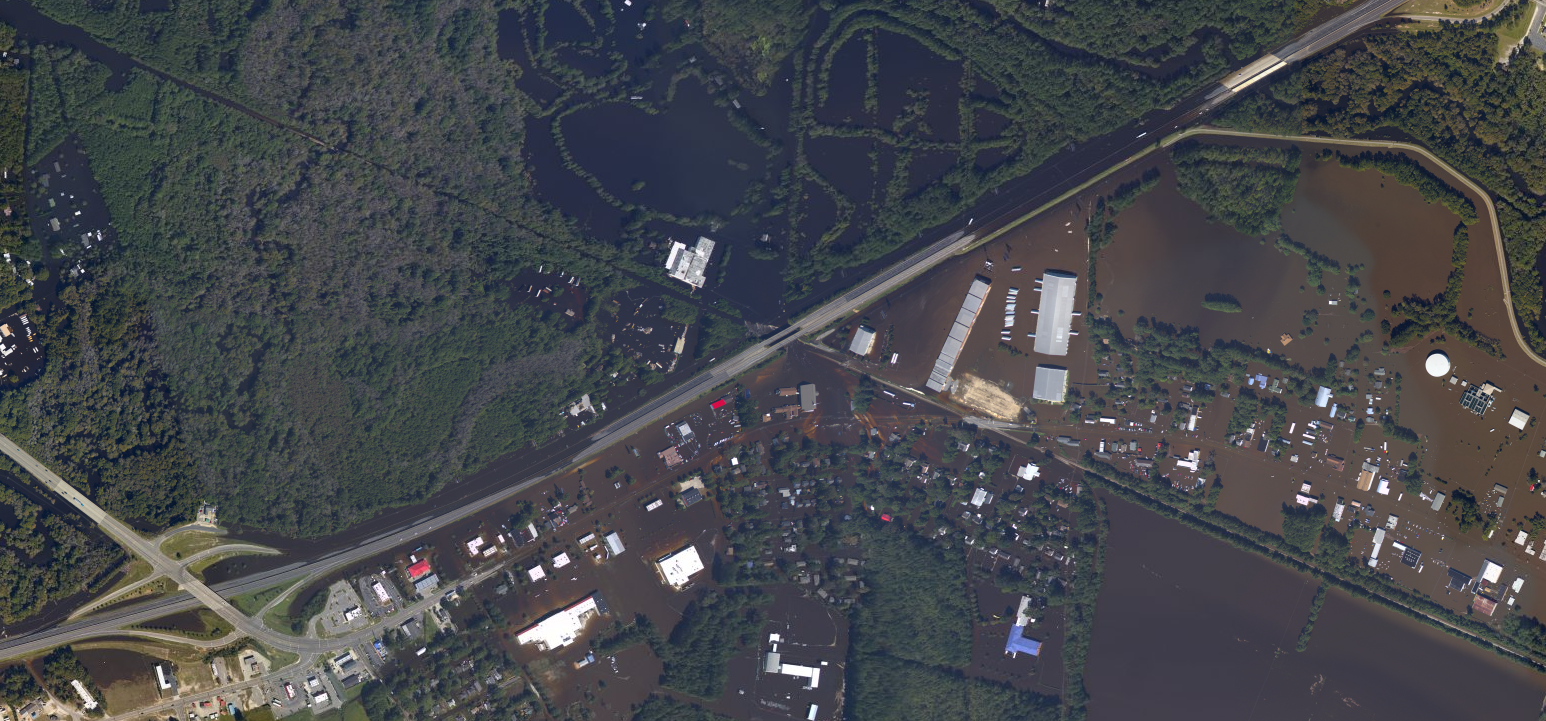
Flooding in Lumberton from Hurricane Matthew, 2016

Following the passage of the North American Free Trade Agreement in 1992, Robeson County lost thousands of manufacturing jobs, followed shortly by a knock-on loss of employment in other sectors. Deindustrialization coupled with the decline in the tobacco industry prompted by the Fair and Equitable Tobacco Reform Act of 2004 caused deep economic and social damage, with increasing underemployment, rising poverty, growing welfare dependency, and an increase in certain types of crimes. Economic development thereafter increasingly focused on the supply of fossil fuels, poultry farming, biogas and biomass facilities, and logging. The Latino population also increased as Mexican immigrants—many of them undocumented—supplanted black agricultural workers.

In 2016, the county was impacted by Hurricane Matthew, leading to record flooding in Lumberton. In 2018, the county was struck by Hurricane Florence, which broke the record. The storms heavily damaged thousands of residences throughout the county, and entire streets in south and west Lumberton were left abandoned. The destruction of significant affordable housing accelerated a population decline in the county, which had begun in 2013. Falling student enrollments in the county school system and declining state education subsidies led the county school board to close nine schools in 2019. During the 2020 presidential election, President Donald Trump held a rally in Robeson County, marking the first time a sitting president had ever held a formal appearance there.

== Geography and physical features ==
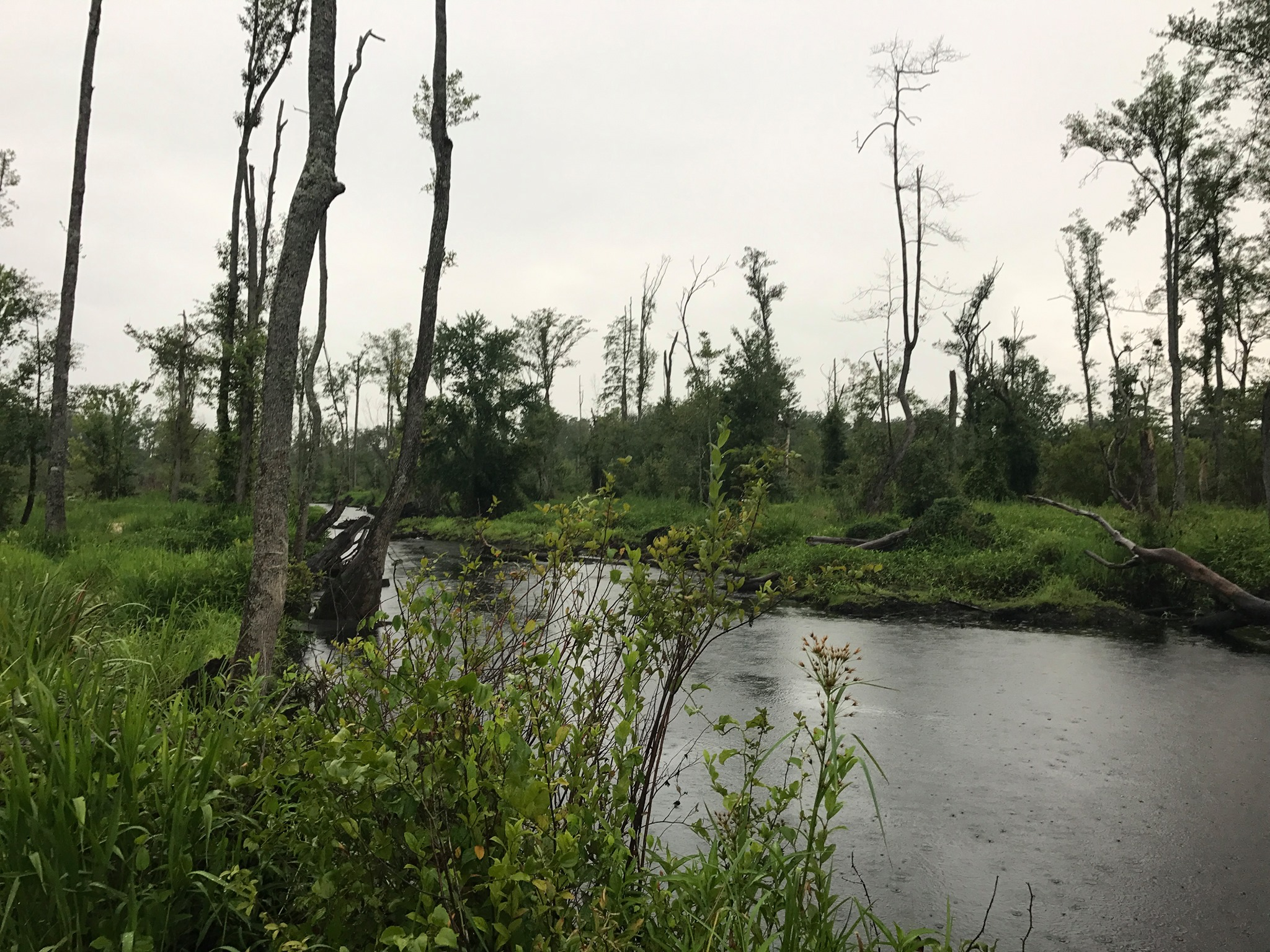
Shoe Heel Creek, south of Maxton

According to the U.S. Census Bureau, the county has a total area of 949.26 square miles (2,458.6 km^{2}), of which 947.30 square miles (2,453.5 km^{2}) is land and 1.96 square miles (5.1 km^{2}) (0.21%) is water. It is the largest county in North Carolina by area. Owing to its large size, the county was historically sometimes referred to informally as the "State of Robeson". It is bordered by the North Carolina counties of Bladen, Columbus, Cumberland, Hoke, and Scotland, and the South Carolina counties of Dillon, Horry, and Marlboro.

Robeson is located in the state's Coastal Plain region and is one of the state's ten counties within the Sandhills region, characterized by sandy and fertile soil. It hosts 11 major soil types, mostly sandy loams. It has a temperate climate and rarely experiences snowfall. The county hosts many pocosins, bald cypress forests, Carolina bays, creeks (including Shoe Heel and Big Shoe Heel), and 50 swamps. The swamps feed into the Lumber River, which flows eastward from the northwest corner of the county to the southeast corner. Portions of the Lumber River State Park are located in Robeson, as is the entirety of the Warwick Mill Bay State Natural Area. The two state game lands in the county are Bullard and Branch Hunting Preserve and Robeson Game Land.

Most of Robeson County lies within the Lumber River basin. The river and its banks support many flora and fauna. Resident mammals include deer, raccoons, muskrats, beavers, minks, and otters. The river also supports wild turkeys and several varieties of ducks. Local fish include catfish, robin, perch, pike, bluegill bream, jack, largemouth bass, smallmouth bass, black crappie, and redbreast sunfish. Reptilian life includes copperhead snakes and some water snakes including cottonmouths. Robeson County is also one of the westernmost regular habitats in the state for American alligators. Plant life supported by the river includes bald cypress, gum, poplar, loblolly-bay, and juniper trees. Ferns, Virginia creeper, Spanish moss, pitcher plants, and Venus flytraps also reside along the river and its tributaries.

== Demographics ==
A map of census tracts in Robeson county by racial plurality, per the 2020 U.S. census Legend: | Native American 30–40% 40–50% 50–60% 60–70% 70–80% 80–90% Black or African American 30–40% 40–50% 50–60% 70–80% | Non-Hispanic White 20–30% 30–40% 40–50% 50–60% Hispanic or Latino 30–40% |

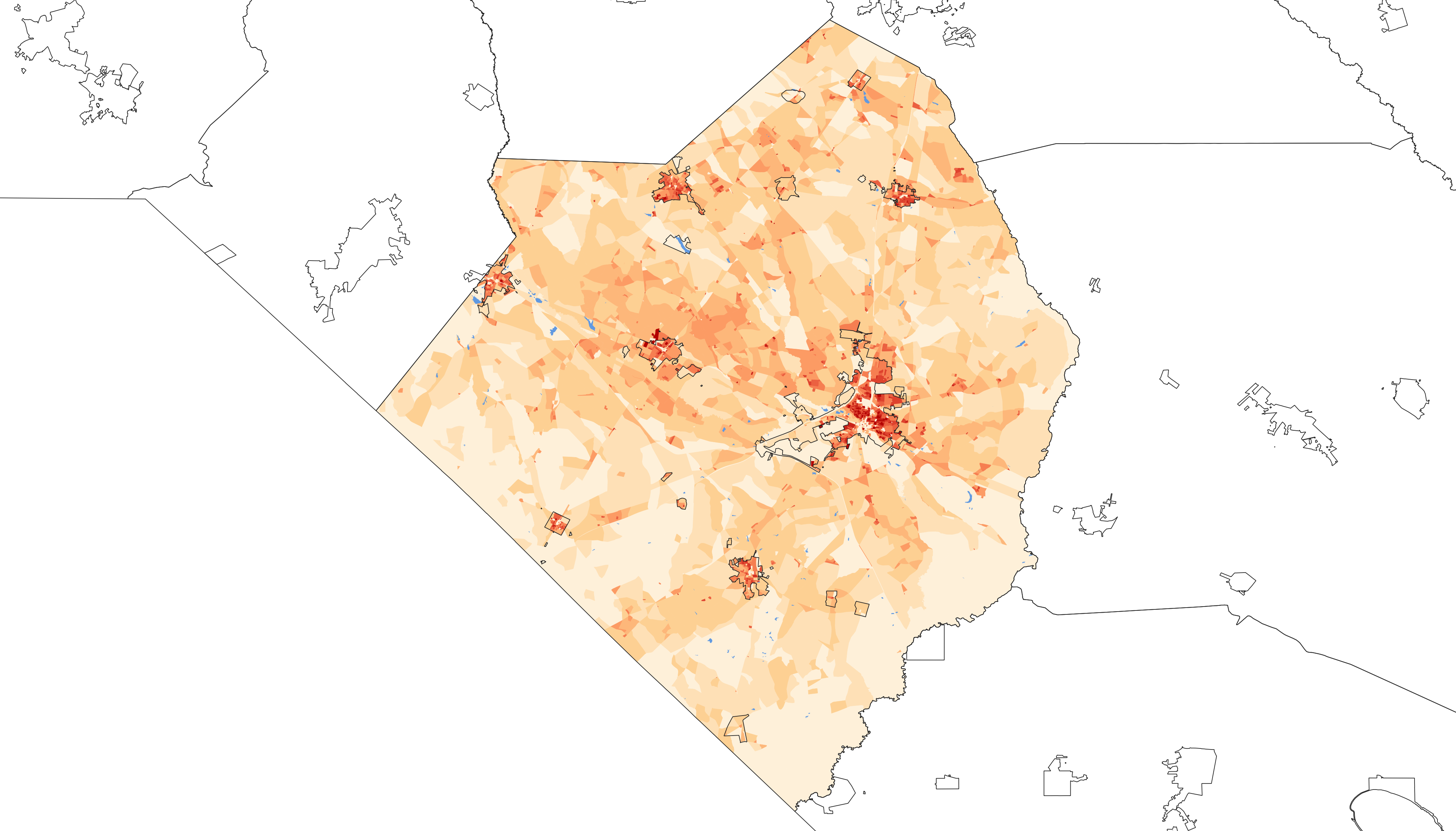
2020 population density of Robeson County NC by census block

=== Racial and ethnic composition ===
Robeson County, North Carolina – Racial and ethnic composition Note: the US Census treats Hispanic/Latino as an ethnic category. This table excludes Latinos from the racial categories and assigns them to a separate category. Hispanics/Latinos may be of any race.
Race / Ethnicity (NH = Non-Hispanic)	2020	2010	2000	1990	1980
White alone (NH)	25% (29,159)	27% (36,160)	30.8% (37,999)	36% (37,850)	39.3% (39,946)
Black alone (NH)	22.5% (26,218)	24.1% (32,347)	25% (30,827)	24.8% (26,125)	24.9% (25,283)
American Indian alone (NH)	37.4% (43,536)	37.9% (50,866)	37.7% (46,459)	38.3% (40,235)	34.4% (34,973)
Asian alone (NH)	0.8% (897)	0.7% (971)	0.3% (385)	0.2% (231)	0.1% (97)
Pacific Islander alone (NH)	0.1% (63)	0% (60)	0% (47)		
Other race alone (NH)	0.4% (411)	0.1% (133)	0.2% (201)	0% (34)	0.1% (140)
Multiracial (NH)	3.9% (4,489)	2% (2,699)	1.2% (1,427)	—	—
Hispanic/Latino (any race)	10.1% (11,757)	8.1% (10,932)	4.9% (5,994)	0.7% (704)	1.2% (1,171)

=== 2020 census ===
As of the 2020 census, the county had a population of 116,530, a median age of 38.1 years, 24.1% of residents under the age of 18, and 16.4% of residents 65 years of age or older. For every 100 females there were 92.5 males, and for every 100 females age 18 and over there were 89.3 males age 18 and over. About 51 percent of county residents were women. Lumberton was the most populous community, with 19,025 residents. 24.0% of residents lived in urban areas, while 76.0% lived in rural areas.

There were 43,402 households in the county, of which 33.5% had children under the age of 18 living in them. Of all households, 38.3% were married-couple households, 19.7% were households with a male householder and no spouse or partner present, and 35.6% were households with a female householder and no spouse or partner present. About 27.7% of all households were made up of individuals and 12.1% had someone living alone who was 65 years of age or older. There were 48,426 housing units, of which 10.4% were vacant. Among occupied housing units, 66.6% were owner-occupied and 33.4% were renter-occupied. The homeowner vacancy rate was 1.1% and the rental vacancy rate was 6.8%.

Racially, there were 30,041 White residents (25.8%), 26,424 Black or African American residents (22.7%), 44,871 American Indian and Alaska Native residents (38.5%), 908 Asian residents (0.8%), 79 Native Hawaiian or Pacific Islander residents (0.1%), 8,192 residents of some other race (7.0%), and 6,015 residents of two or more races (5.2%). Of the total among the races, 11,757 people identified as Hispanic or Latino, representing 10.1% of the population. It is a majority-minority county and proportionately has the largest Native American population of any North Carolina county and the smallest white population.

The most reported detailed ancestries in 2020 were Lumbee Tribe of North Carolina (28.5%), African American (14.7%), English (7.3%), Mexican (6.9%), Irish (2.9%), and German (1.6%).

Robeson County is included in the Fayetteville-Lumberton-Pinehurst, NC Combined Statistical Area.

=== Demographic change ===
Historical population

Historical population
Census	Pop.	Note	%±
1790	5,343		—
1800	6,839		28.0%
1810	7,528		10.1%
1820	8,204		9.0%
1830	9,433		15.0%
1840	10,370		9.9%
1850	12,826		23.7%
1860	15,489		20.8%
1870	16,262		5.0%
1880	23,880		46.8%
1890	31,483		31.8%
1900	40,371		28.2%
1910	51,945		28.7%
1920	54,674		5.3%
1930	66,512		21.7%
1940	76,860		15.6%
1950	87,769		14.2%
1960	89,102		1.5%
1970	84,842		−4.8%
1980	101,610		19.8%
1990	105,179		3.5%
2000	123,339		17.3%
2010	134,168		8.8%
2020	116,530		−13.1%
2025 (est.)	119,941	▲	2.9%
U.S. Decennial Census; 1790–1960 1900–1990; 1990–2000 2010 2020

Robeson County had a loss of 17,638 people between 2010 and 2020, a decline of 13.1 percent, and the largest numerical decline among North Carolina's counties. Between the 2010 and 2020 censuses, the white demographic experienced the largest decrease in size, while Hispanics and people who identify as two or more races experienced the most significant increases. The proportion of county residents under the age of 18 dropped by 22 percent. The North Carolina Rural Center reported a 0.91 percent increase in the county's population between 2020 and 2023.

== Law and government ==
=== Government ===
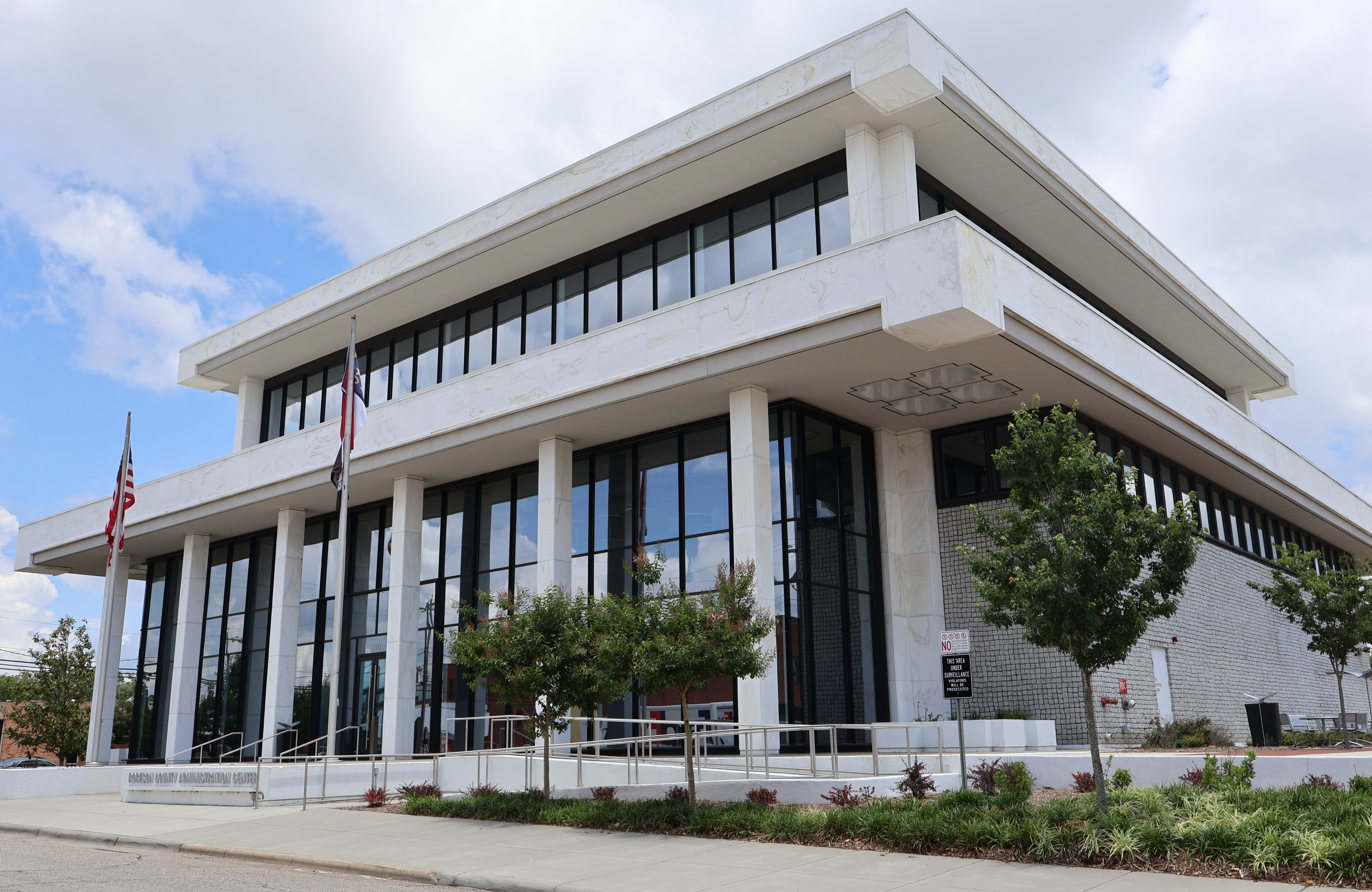
Robeson County Administration Center in Lumberton

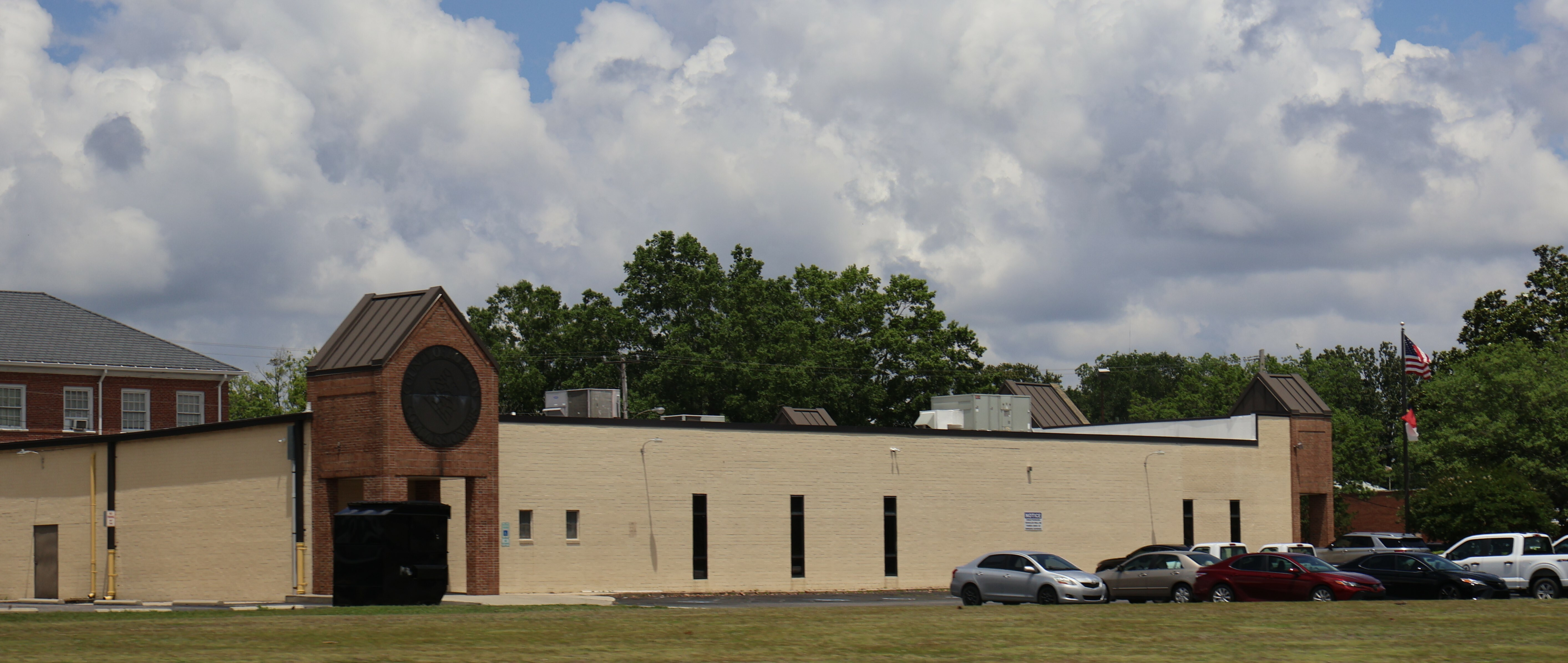
Robeson County Commissioners Building in Lumberton

Robeson County is run by a commission–manager government. The county commission comprises eight members elected from single-member districts in four-year staggered terms. Presided over by a chair elected by the commissioners from among their members for one year, the commission has legislative and policy-making authority over county government. The commissioners appoint a county manager with executive authority over county administration and implement the commission's decisions. The manager appoints directors of county government departments. The county government supplies emergency services, social services, public health services, recreation, and economic development in its jurisdiction. It also maintains a water system and landfill. A local property tax funds the county government. Several county departments are headquartered in the Robeson County Administration Center in Lumberton.

Robeson County is a member of the Lumber River Council of Governments, a regional planning board representing five counties. The county also has a Soil and Water Conservation District led by an elected supervisor. Robeson County is located in North Carolina's 7th congressional district, the North Carolina Senate's 24th district, and the North Carolina House of Representatives' 46th and 47th district. Robeson is one of the four counties within the jurisdiction of the Lumbee Tribe of North Carolina. Tribal members within the county elect some members of the tribal council. Its headquarters is in Pembroke.

=== Incumbent county officials ===
Office	Name	Party
Commissioner, District 1	Wixie Stephens	Republican
Commissioner, District 2	Pauline Campbell	Democrat
Commissioner, District 3	John Cummings	Republican
Commissioner, District 4	Faline Locklear Dial	Republican
Commissioner, District 5	Judy Sampson	Democrat
Commissioner, District 6	David Edge	Republican
Commissioner, District 7	Tom Taylor	Republican
Commissioner, District 8	Lance Herndon	Republican

Office	Name	Party
Sheriff	Burnis Wilkins	Democrat
Register of Deeds	Vicki Locklear	Democrat
Clerk of Superior Court	Shelena Smith	Democrat
District Attorney	Matt Scott	Democrat

=== Law enforcement and judicial system ===
Robeson County lies within the bounds of North Carolina's 20th Prosecutorial District, the 16B Superior Court District, and the 16B District Court District. County residents elect a county sheriff, clerk of Superior Court, and district attorney. Judicial officials work out of the Robeson County Courthouse in Lumberton. Law enforcement is provided across the county by the sheriff's office, while the University of North Carolina at Pembroke and the towns of Lumberton, St. Pauls, Maxton, Red Springs, Rowland, Pembroke, and Fairmont retain police departments. According to an October 2021 report issued by the State Bureau of Investigation, in 2020 Robeson experienced the highest violent crime rate of the state's counties at 1,190 incidents per 100,000 people, and the third-worst overall crime rate.

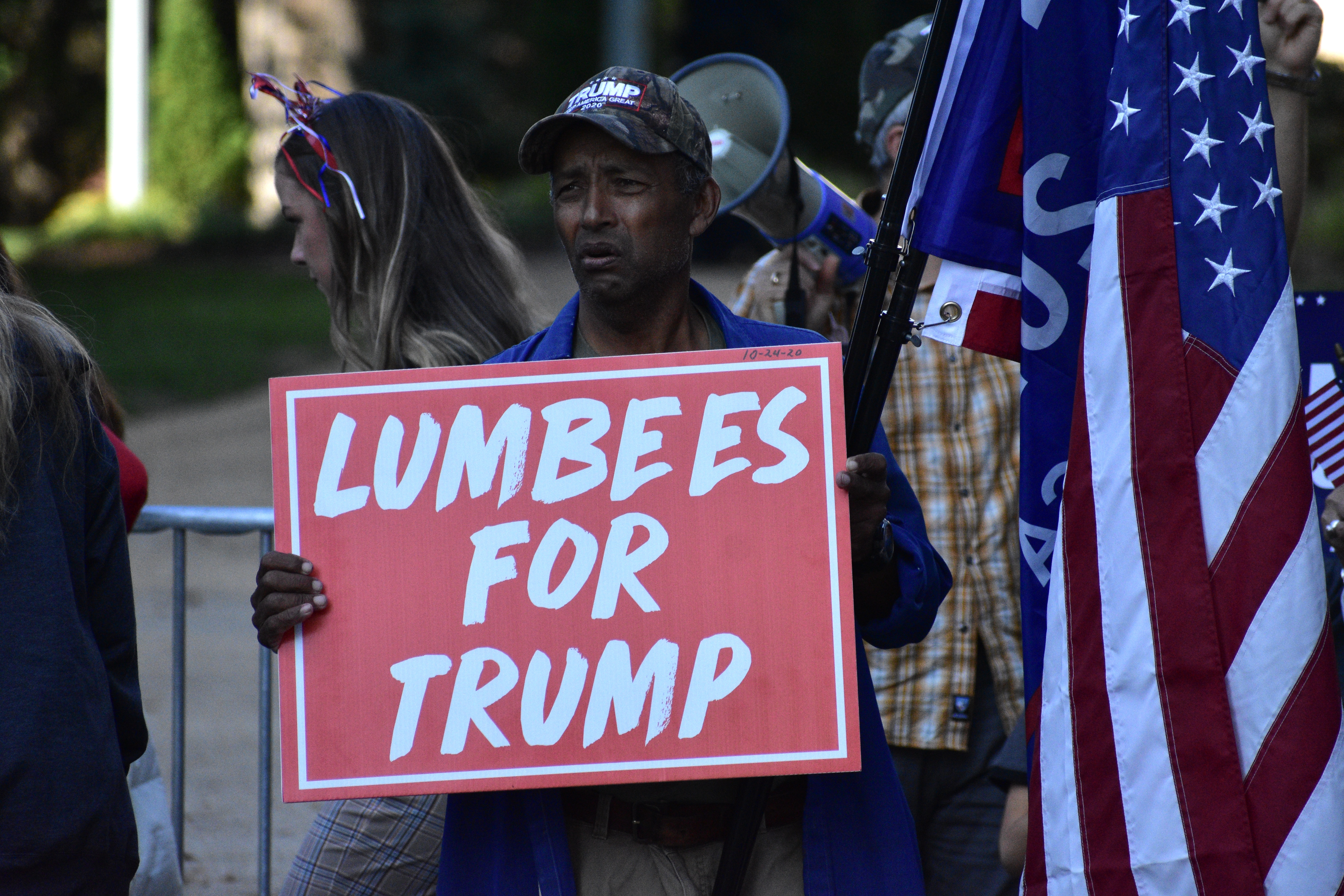
Republican presidential candidate Donald Trump won Robeson County in 2016, 2020, and 2024 with the support of many Lumbees.

=== Politics ===
Historical presidential election returns

United States presidential election results for Robeson County, North Carolina
Year	Republican		Democratic		Third party(ies)	
Year	No.	%	No.	%	No.	%
1880	1,960	46.72%	2,235	53.28%	0	0.00%
1884	2,278	47.65%	2,503	52.35%	0	0.00%
1888	1,970	40.29%	2,879	58.88%	41	0.84%
1892	1,117	26.15%	2,312	54.13%	842	19.71%
1896	2,429	41.25%	3,457	58.70%	3	0.05%
1900	1,144	25.86%	3,280	74.14%	0	0.00%
1904	982	30.10%	2,274	69.71%	6	0.18%
1908	1,300	32.52%	2,698	67.48%	0	0.00%
1912	154	4.38%	2,706	76.88%	660	18.75%
1916	1,453	33.43%	2,894	66.57%	0	0.00%
1920	2,220	26.42%	6,183	73.58%	0	0.00%
1924	314	7.15%	4,064	92.53%	14	0.32%
1928	2,767	36.91%	4,730	63.09%	0	0.00%
1932	783	9.01%	7,860	90.48%	44	0.51%
1936	732	6.65%	10,280	93.35%	0	0.00%
1940	931	9.14%	9,251	90.86%	0	0.00%
1944	1,118	13.32%	7,278	86.68%	0	0.00%
1948	1,036	11.34%	7,056	77.26%	1,041	11.40%
1952	4,127	30.71%	9,311	69.29%	0	0.00%
1956	2,785	20.94%	10,516	79.06%	0	0.00%
1960	3,580	23.55%	11,623	76.45%	0	0.00%
1964	3,591	20.65%	13,796	79.35%	0	0.00%
1968	4,526	23.55%	8,248	42.92%	6,441	33.52%
1972	11,362	59.99%	7,391	39.02%	188	0.99%
1976	4,907	19.09%	20,695	80.53%	97	0.38%
1980	6,982	27.89%	17,618	70.39%	430	1.72%
1984	12,947	45.76%	15,257	53.93%	87	0.31%
1988	9,908	36.70%	16,988	62.92%	104	0.39%
1992	7,777	25.52%	19,378	63.59%	3,319	10.89%
1996	8,146	29.44%	17,361	62.74%	2,164	7.82%
2000	11,721	39.40%	17,834	59.95%	192	0.65%
2004	15,909	46.97%	17,868	52.75%	94	0.28%
2008	17,433	42.69%	23,058	56.47%	343	0.84%
2012	17,510	40.77%	24,988	58.18%	448	1.04%
2016	20,762	50.82%	19,016	46.54%	1,080	2.64%
2020	27,806	58.93%	19,020	40.31%	362	0.77%
2024	29,647	63.39%	16,728	35.77%	395	0.84%

Politically, Robeson County has historically been dominated by the Democratic Party. A majority of Robesonians voted for Republican presidential candidate Richard Nixon in 1972, but then voted for Democratic presidential candidates in the next nine elections. The local Republican Party grew in the early 21st century, fueled by prevailing religious conservatism in the county and discontent with the loss of manufacturing jobs. Many of the Democrats who remained with their party were conservative.

Democrats continued to win state and local races by large margins in the 2000s but their margins of victory in presidential and congressional races decreased. In 2016 and 2020, county voters favored Republican Donald Trump, who won over majorities of white and Lumbee voters by championing socially conservative issues, criticizing free trade agreements, and declaring his support for full federal recognition of the Lumbee Tribe. The area also began increasingly voting for Republican state and local candidates, with Robesonians in 2016 electing their first Republican state senator since Reconstruction. In 2020, Republicans won most races in the county.

As of April 2022, Robeson hosts about 70,400 registered voters, comprising about 36,500 registered Democrats, 12,300 registered Republicans and 21,300 unaffiliated. Trump won the county again in 2024, this time with an even harder swing. Indeed, Robeson County shifted further to the Republican presidential candidate in 2024 than any North Carolina county, and Trump's 63 percent of the vote was higher than any Republican has ever gotten in Robeson County, with the swing happening in both cities and rural majority Native-American precincts. The North Carolina Board of Elections now reports that Robeson is the second most Republican county in the entire state. Robeson has historically had the lowest turnout in the state, and 2024 was the fourth consecutive time this had happened. In 2025, three out of the six county commissioners switched to the Republican Party, giving it a majority for the first time in county history, and marking the first time the county has been fully controlled and represented at all levels by Republicans.

== Economy ==
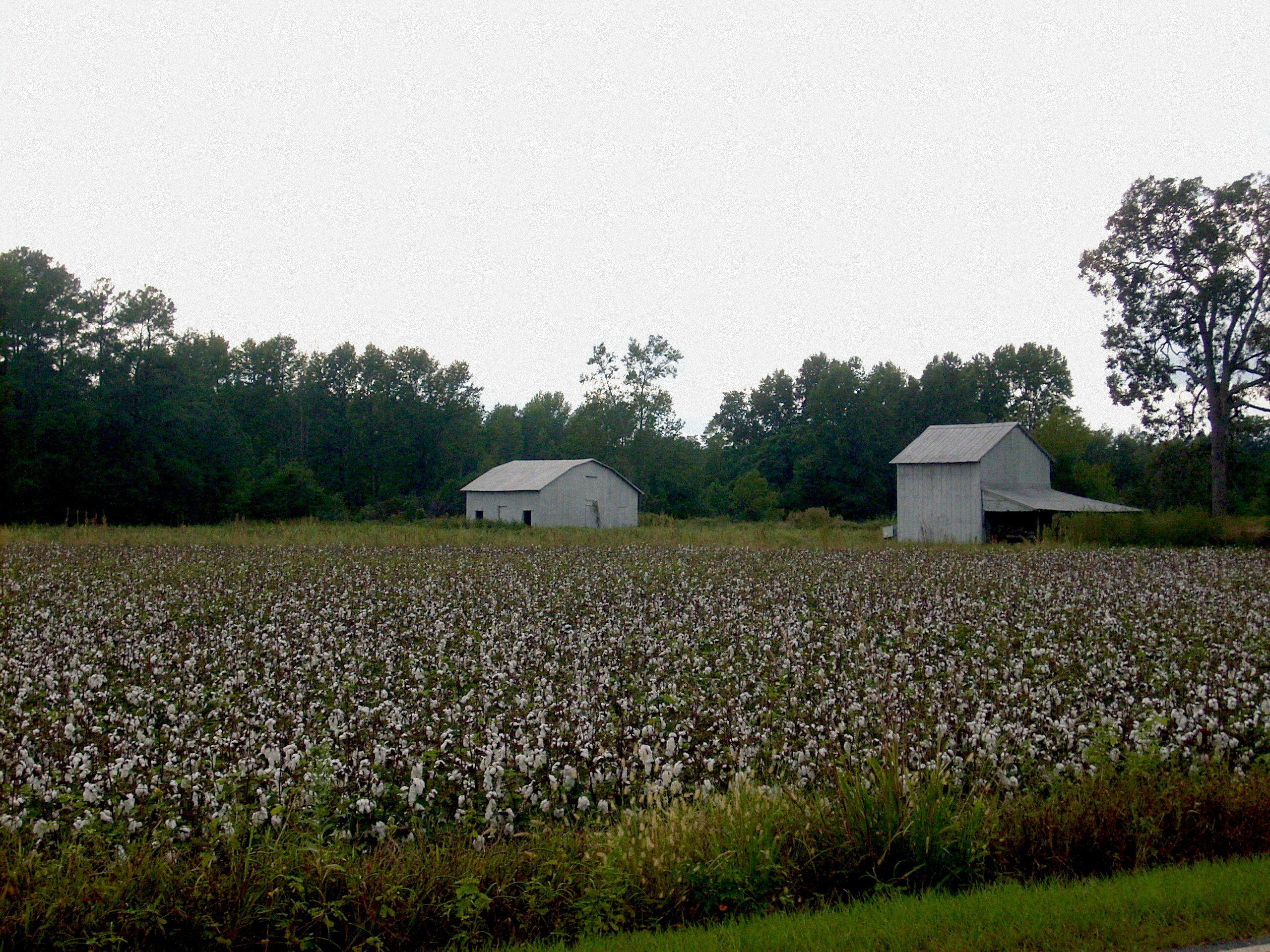
A cotton field near Rex

Robeson County largely relied on the textile and tobacco industries throughout the 20th century. Agriculture predominated in employment in 1960, and the county earned the second-highest agriculture-related revenue among all Southern counties, though its per-capita income remained low. By 1970, agriculture had been overtaken by manufacturing, and the completion of Interstate 95 within several years accelerated industrialization. By 1990, fewer than 2,300 Robesonians worked in agriculture, and manufacturing accounted for a third of the county's employment.

The tobacco and manufacturing sectors rapidly declined in the 1990s and 2000s, with manufacturing especially adversely impacted by several national free trade agreements. The Robeson County Office of Economic Development determined that the implementation of the North American Free Trade Agreement led to the closure of 32 manufacturing facilities and the loss of over 6,000 jobs between 1995 and 2005. From 1997 to 2007, the county lost 22,860 acres in farmland.

Tobacco is still grown in the county, as are corn, soybeans, sorghum, peanuts, and cotton. Some local landowners raise pine trees and sell them as timber. Poultry farming has rapidly increased since the 1990s, making the county the state's fifth-largest poultry producer in 2023. In recent years commercial activity has grown along the Interstate 95 corridor. Chicken processing, pork processing, and the pellet fuel industry have supplanted much of the former textile industry. The significant presence of such high-pollution industries in the county has led some residents to describe the area as a sacrifice zone.

Health care/social assistance, manufacturing, retail, education, and accommodation/food service are the largest-employing sectors in Robeson County. In 2023, the median household income was $42,180, the lowest in the state. In 2023, 28 percent of local residents were impoverished, making Robeson one of the poorest counties in the state. In its 2026 county economic tier ratings, the North Carolina Department of Commerce classified Robeson as the seventh-most economically distressed county in the state.

== Transportation ==
Interactive map of Robeson County

Robeson County is served by Interstate 95, which travels north–south through the county; and Interstate 74 (incomplete), which travels east–west. The two routes intersect to the southwest of Lumberton. It is also served by U.S. Route 74 (Alt.) (Bus.), US 301, US 501, and North Carolina Highways 20, 41, 71, 72, 83, 130 (Bus.), 211, 295 (to become I-295), 710, 711, and 904. County government supports a public transport bus service, the South East Area Transit System.

Airplane facilities are provided by the Lumberton Municipal Airport in Lumberton. The Laurinburg–Maxton Airport, situated in Scotland County near the border with Robeson, serves both the Scotland city of Laurinburg and the Robeson town of Maxton. Railroads in Robeson County are operated by CSX Transportation. The longest straight stretch of railroad track in the United States, spanning 78.86 miles, passes through Robeson.

== Education ==
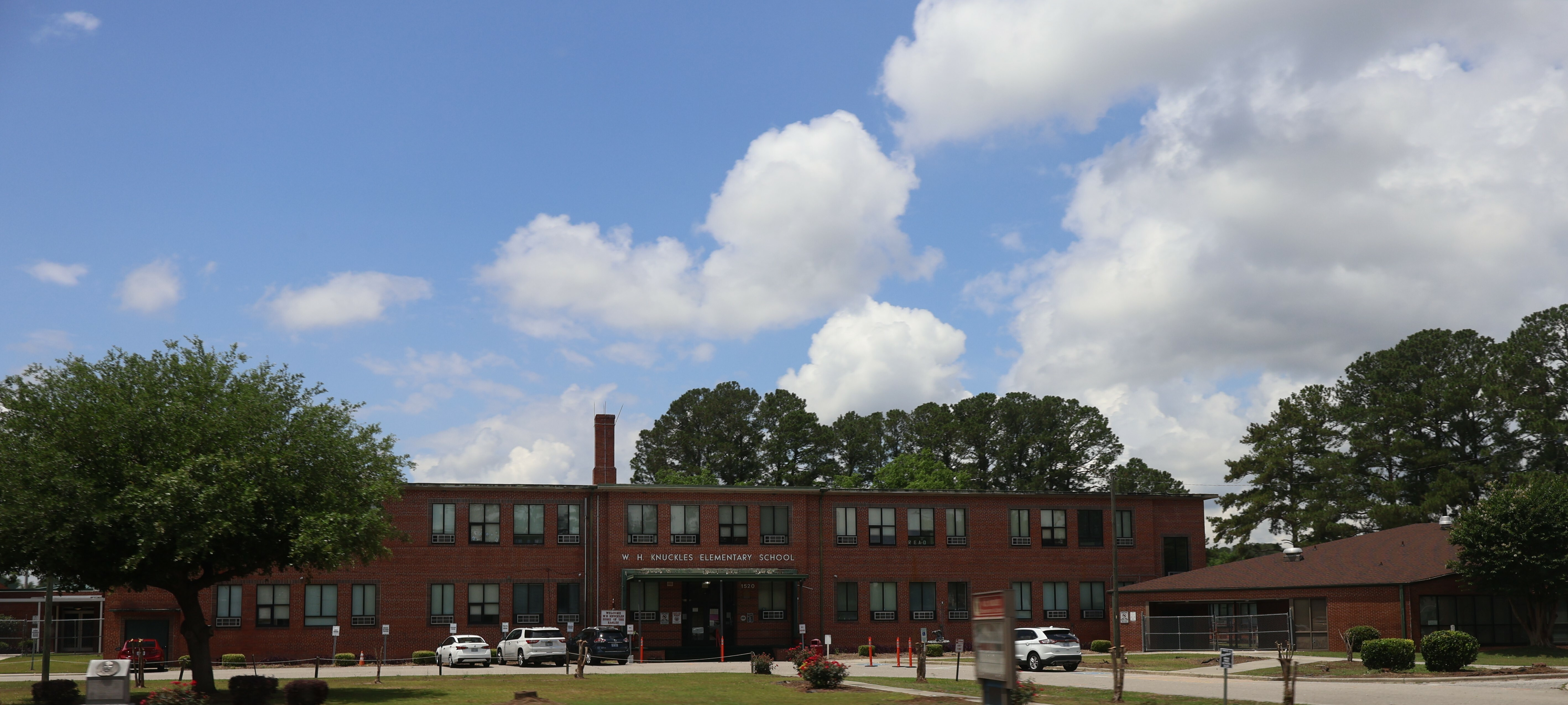
W.H. Knuckles Elementary School in Lumberton

Robeson County has a nonpartisan elected board of education, with district-based as well as at-large seats. The Public Schools of Robeson County (PSRC) operates public schools, with its jurisdiction being the entire county. As of 2022, the system operates 36 schools and serves about 23,000 students. The state classifies the PSRC as a low-performing district. The county hosts two post-secondary institutions: the University of North Carolina at Pembroke and Robeson Community College. Additionally, the PSRC supports the Robeson Planetarium. The county government runs seven libraries. A county history museum is located in Lumberton. According to the 2022 American Community Survey, an estimated 16.4 percent of county residents have attained a bachelor's degree or higher level of education.

== Healthcare ==
Robeson County is served by a single hospital, UNC Health Southeastern, based in Lumberton. The Robeson Health Care Corporation also provides medical care to residents through various clinics. According to the 2022 County Health Rankings produced by the University of Wisconsin Population Health Institute, Robeson County had the worst health outcomes of all of North Carolina's counties. Per the ranking, 32 percent of adults say they are in poor or fair health, the average life expectancy is 72 years—six years lower than the state average, and 19 percent of people under the age of 65 lack health insurance. The county has been heavily impacted by the opioid epidemic, and in 2021 suffered from the highest fatal opioid overdose rate among North Carolina's counties.

== Culture ==
Robeson is pronounced by local residents as "RAH-bih-sun" or "ROB-uh-son". Outsiders sometimes pronounce it as "ROW-bih-sun". In line with the predominantly tri-ethnic nature of the county, whites, blacks, and Native Americans generally operate as three different sociocultural entities. Members of each group generally express dialectal differences in their speech.

The collard sandwich—consisting of fried cornbread, collard greens, and fatback—is a popular dish among the Lumbee people in the county. Numerous small communities in the county are culturally insular owing to their lack of contact with people from outside the county. Most towns host their own annual festivals. The Lumbee Homecoming, a festival for Lumbee tribal members, is held annually in late June and early July and often brings thousands of Lumbees as well as tourists to the county.

Fishing and hunting have long been popular activities in the county, both as means of acquiring food and as sports. The Carolina boat—a style of skiff of marine plywood construction—originated in the county. Many in the county are religious, and religion is a key part of local public life. Several area buildings and sites have been listed on the National Register of Historic Places.

== Communities ==
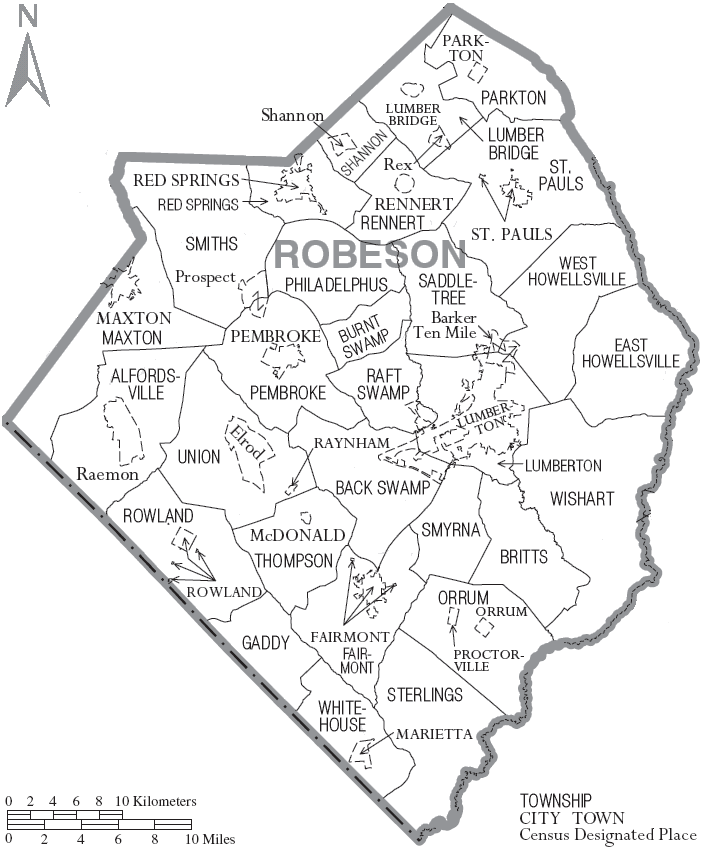
Map of Robeson County with municipal and township labels

=== City ===
- Lumberton (county seat and largest community)

=== Towns ===
- Fairmont
- Lumber Bridge
- Marietta
- Maxton (also in Scotland County)
- McDonald
- Orrum
- Parkton
- Pembroke
- Proctorville
- Raynham
- Red Springs
- Rennert
- Rowland
- St. Pauls

=== Townships ===
Robeson County townships include:

- Alfordsville
- Back Swamp
- Barnesville
- Britts
- Burnt Swamp
- East Howellsville
- Gaddy
- Parkton
- Philadelphus
- Raft Swamp
- Red Springs
- Rennert
- Saddletree
- Shannon
- Smiths
- Smyrna
- Sterlings
- Thompson
- Tolarsville
- Union
- West Howellsville
- Whitehouse
- Wishart

=== Census-designated places ===
- Barker Ten Mile
- Elrod
- Prospect
- Raemon
- Rex
- Shannon
- Wakulla

=== Unincorporated communities ===
- Barnesville
- Howellsville
- Five Forks
- Red Banks
- Moss Neck
- Pates

== See also ==
- List of counties in North Carolina

== Works cited ==
- Bhadury, Joyendu; Burkey, Mark L.; Troy, Samuel P. (2015). "Chapter 3: Location Modeling for Strategic Parks". Applications of Location Analysis. Springer. pp. 55–83. ISBN 9783319202822.
- Blu, Karen I. (2001). The Lumbee Problem: The Making of an American Indian People (reprint ed.). Lincoln: University of Nebraska Press. ISBN 978-0-8032-6197-6.
- Bradley, Mark L. (2009). Bluecoats and Tar Heels: Soldiers and Civilians in Reconstruction North Carolina. Lexington: The University of Kentucky Press. ISBN 978-0-8131-2507-7.
- Chalmers, David Mark (2005). Backfire: How the Ku Klux Klan Helped the Civil Rights Movement (reprint ed.). Rowman & Littlefield. ISBN 978-0-7425-2311-1.
- Corbitt, David Leroy (2000). The formation of the North Carolina counties, 1663-1943 (reprint ed.). Raleigh: North Carolina Division of Archives and History. OCLC 46398241.
- Cunningham, David (2013). Klansville, U.S.A: The Rise and Fall of the Civil Rights-era Ku Klux Klan (illustrated, reprint ed.). Oxford University Press USA. ISBN 978-0-19-975202-7.
- Dial, Adolph L.; Eliades, David K. (1996). The Only Land I Know: A History of the Lumbee Indians (1st Syracuse University Press ed.). Syracuse: Syracuse University Press. ISBN 978-0-8156-0360-3.
- Emanuel, Ryan E. (January 2019). "Water in the Lumbee World: A River and Its People in a Time of Change". Environmental History. 24 (1): 25–51. doi:10.1093/envhis/emy129. ISSN 1930-8892.
- Evans, William McKee (1971). To Die Game: The Story of the Lowry Band, Indian Guerillas of Reconstruction. Baton Rouge: Louisiana State University Press. ISBN 9780807108161.
- Faircloth, Zachary (2022). "In a Shallow Boat". Southern Cultures. 28 (3): 95–109. doi:10.1353/scu.2022.0029. S2CID 254221480.
- Haladay, Jane; Hicks, Scott, eds. (2017). Narratives of Educating for Sustainability in Unsustainable Environments. East Lansing: Michigan State University Press. ISBN 9781611862645.
- Jenne, Kurt (1998). "A Profile of County Manager Government in North Carolina". Popular Government. Vol. 64, no. 1. Institute of Government, University of North Carolina. pp. 13–20.
- Land potential study, Robeson County, North Carolina. Lumberton: N.C. Department of Conservation and Development, Division of Community Planning. 1969. OCLC 1047424681.
- Lowery, Malinda Maynor (2010). Lumbee Indians in the Jim Crow South: Race, Identity, and the Making of a Nation. Chapel Hill: University of North Carolina Press. ISBN 978-0-8078-3368-1.
- Lowery, Malinda Maynor (2016). "Chapter 9: Finding Wisdom in Places: Lumbee Family History". Indigenous Diasporas and Dislocations (reprint ed.). New York: Routledge. ISBN 9780754639060.
- Lowery, Malinda Maynor (2018). The Lumbee Indians: An American Struggle. Chapel Hill: UNC Press Books. ISBN 9781469646381.
- Magdol, Edward (1973). "Against the Gentry: An Inquiry into a Southern Lower-Class Community and Culture, 1865-1870". Journal of Social History. 6 (3): 259–283. doi:10.1353/jsh/6.3.259. JSTOR 3786541.
- Marson, Stephen M.; Legerton, Mac (2021). "Disaster diaspora and the consequences of economic displacement and climate disruption, including Hurricanes Matthew (October 8, 2016) and Florence (September 14, 2018) in Robeson County, North Carolina". Natural Hazards. 107 (3): 2247–2262. Bibcode:2021NatHa.107.2247M. doi:10.1007/s11069-021-04529-8. S2CID 231671525.
- Maxwell, William (2017). "The Back Swamp drainage project, Robeson County, North Carolina: Biopolitical intervention in the lives of Indian farmers". Water History. 9 (1): 9–28. Bibcode:2017WatHi...9....9M. doi:10.1007/s12685-016-0176-8. S2CID 164943329.
- Montgomery, Michael; Mishoe, Margaret (1999). ""He Bes Took up with a Yankee Girl and Moved up There to New York": The Verb Bes in the Carolinas and Its History". American Speech. 74 (3): 240–275. ISSN 1527-2133.
- Paschal, Richard A. (2021). Jim Crow in North Carolina : The Legislative Program from 1865 to 1920. Durham: Carolina Academic Press. ISBN 9781531017712.
- Pierce, Daniel S. (2019). Tar Heel Lightnin': How Secret Stills and Fast Cars Made North Carolina the Moonshine Capital of the World. Chapel Hill: The University of North Carolina Press. ISBN 9781469653563.
- Powell, William S. (1976). The North Carolina Gazetteer: A Dictionary of Tar Heel Places. Chapel Hill: The University of North Carolina Press. ISBN 9780807812471.
- Oakley, Christopher Arris (2008). "'When Carolina Indians Went on the Warpath': The Media, the Klan, and the Lumbees of North Carolina" (PDF). Southern Cultures. 14 (4): 55–84. doi:10.1353/scu.0.0022. ISSN 1068-8218. S2CID 143772906.
- Quinterno, John (February 2006). "Eastern North Carolina at Work: What are the region's economic engines?" (PDF). N.C. Insight. N.C. Center for Public Policy Research. pp. 2–37.
- Rains, Curtis (October 2010), Robeson County Working Lands Protection Plan (PDF), North Carolina Department of Environmental Quality
- Robeson County, North Carolina Annual Comprehensive Financial Report For the Fiscal Year Ended June 30, 2021 (PDF), Lumberton: Finance Department of Robeson County, 2021
- Sharpe, Bill (November 1952). "Robust Robeson". The State. Vol. 20, no. 26. pp. 3–5, 33–34.
- Sider, Gerald M. (2003). Living Indian Histories: Lumbee and Tuscarora People in North Carolina (revised ed.). Chapel Hill: UNC Press Books. ISBN 9780807855065.
- Sider, Gerald M. (2015). Race Becomes Tomorrow: North Carolina and the Shadow of Civil Rights. Duke University Press. ISBN 978-0-8223-7504-3.
- Tyner, K. Blake (2014). Lumberton. Arcadia Publishing. ISBN 9781467120258.
- Tyner, K. Blake (2003). Robeson County. Arcadia Publishing. ISBN 9780738515236.
- Tyner, K. Blake (2005). Robeson County in Vintage Postcards. Arcadia Publishing. ISBN 9780738541624.
- Wolfram, Walt; Reaser, Jeffrey (2014). Talkin' Tar Heel : How Our Voices Tell the Story of North Carolina. Chapel Hill: The University of North Carolina Press. ISBN 978-1-4696-1437-3.
