= North Carolina Highway 711 =

State highway in Robeson County, North Carolina, US

North Carolina Highway 711

Route information
- Maintained by NCDOT
- Length: 11.7 mi (18.8 km)
- Existed: 1952–present

Major junctions
- South end: I-95 / US 301 / NC 72 in Lumberton
- North end: NC 710 in Pembroke

Location
- Country: United States
- State: North Carolina
- Counties: Robeson

Highway system
- North Carolina Highway System; Interstate; US; State; Scenic
← NC 710	→ NC 731

North Carolina Highway 711 (NC 711) is a primary state highway in the U.S. state of North Carolina. It connects the town of Pembroke with Interstate 95 (I-95) and U.S. Route 301 (US 301) in Lumberton. The highway travels in an east-to-west orientation but is signed as a north-south highway (with its easternmost point in Lumberton as its southern terminus), entirely in Robeson County.

== Route description ==
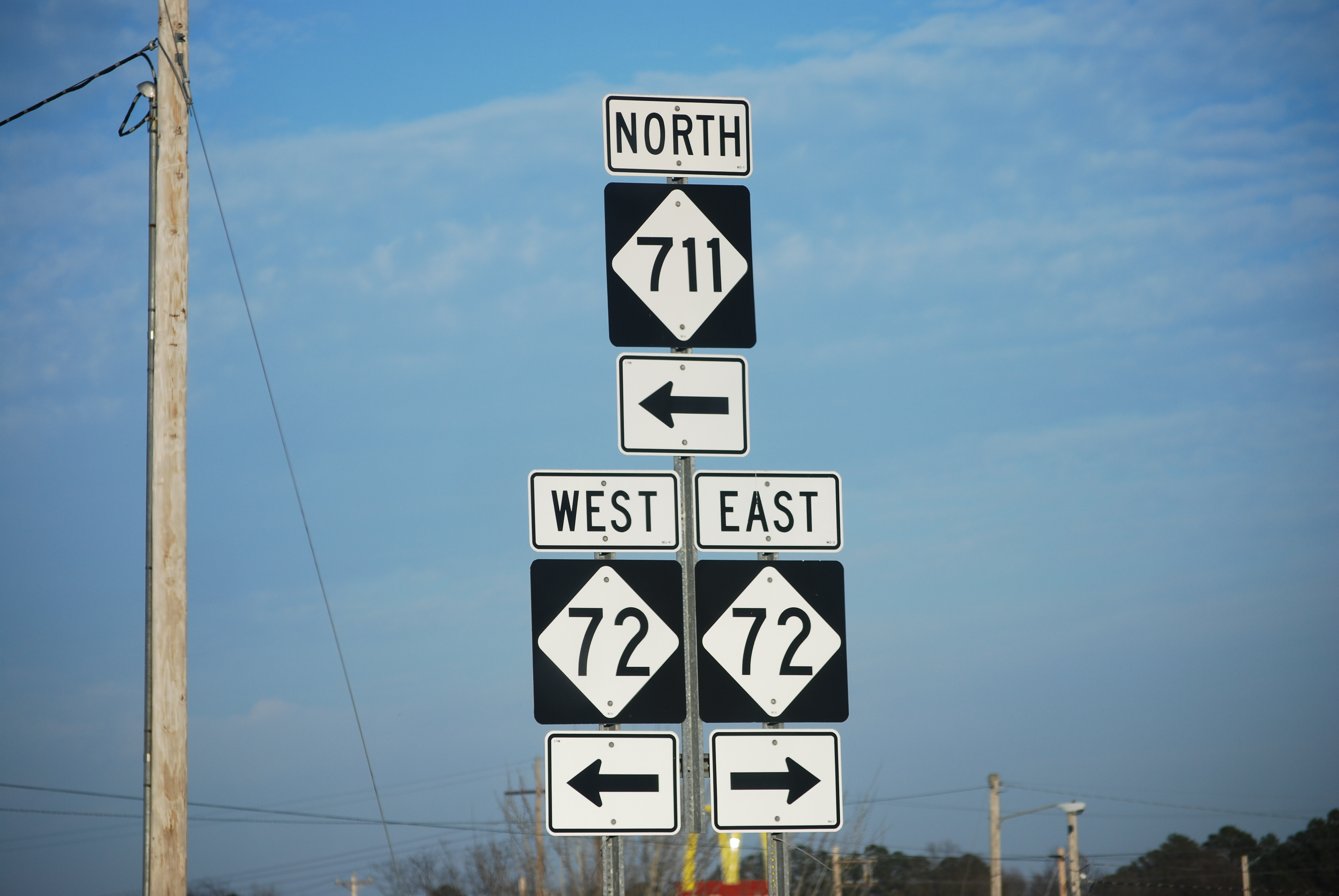
Directional signage at the end of the I-95/US 301 exit ramp

NC 711 is a predominantly two-lane highway that travels from I-95/US 301 in Lumberton to NC 710 in Pembroke. South of the I-95 interchange, the road continues to the east towards downtown Lumberton as NC 72. NC 711 and NC 72 share a concurrency for 1/2 mile (0.80 km) north of the interchange. Two key features of the route is its crossing of the Lumber River near its southern terminus and its pass-by of University of North Carolina at Pembroke in downtown Pembroke.

== History ==
NC 711 was established in 1951 or 1952 as a reestablishment of a primary highway between Lumberton and Pembroke. The route previously existed as US 74, but was downgraded to a secondary road when it was rerouted south onto new bypass south of the Lumber River in 1949. The original routing was from NC 72 to NC 710. Between 1963-1968, NC 711 was extended south, overlapping NC 72 to its current southern terminus with I-95/US 301.

== Junction list ==
The entire route is in Robeson County.

Location	mi	km	Destinations	Notes
Lumberton	0.0	0.0	I-95 / US 301 / NC 72 east (Caton Road) – Rowland, Laurinburg, Fayetteville	East end of NC 72 overlap; exit 17 (I-95)
Lumberton	0.5	0.80	NC 72 east (Caton Road) – Red Springs	West end of NC 72 overlap
Pembroke	11.7	18.8	NC 710 – Rowland, Red Springs	
1.000 mi = 1.609 km; 1.000 km = 0.621 mi: Concurrency terminus
