= North Carolina Highway 72 =

State highway in Robeson County, North Carolina, US

North Carolina Highway 72

Route information
- Maintained by NCDOT
- Length: 32.9 mi (52.9 km)
- Existed: 1934–present

Major junctions
- West end: NC 211 in Red Springs
- I-95 / US 301 / NC 711 in Lumberton
- East end: US 74 near Boardman

Location
- Country: United States
- State: North Carolina
- Counties: Robeson

Highway system
- North Carolina Highway System; Interstate; US; State; Scenic
← NC 71	→ I-73

North Carolina Highway 72 (NC 72) is a primary state highway in the U.S. state of North Carolina that serves the communities of Red Springs and Lumberton. The east;west-signed highway physically runs more north and south through Robeson County.it got extended to Holden Beach, NC in 2025, having a concurrency with US 74/North Carolina Highway 130, and North Carolina Highway 211. Signed as a North;South Highway in Columbus and Brunswick Counties

== Route description ==
The western terminus of NC 72 and NC 710 is in Red Springs at the NC 211 intersection. From there, the two highways travel on a concurrency south (signed east) for 1.8 miles (2.9 km) and split, with NC 72 heading towards Lumberton. Inside the city limits of Lumberton, NC 711 joins NC 72 for a concurrency for about one-half mile (0.80 km). The highway has an interchange with I-95 and US 301 at which point NC 711 ends. Inside Lumberton, it has a concurrency with NC 41. The final leg of the route sees it intersect with NC 211 (also where the NC 41 concurrency ends) then heads south (signed east) to its terminal junction with US 74 (Future I-74) near Orrum and Boardman.

== History ==
NC 72 was created in 1934 running from Red Springs to US 74 near Lumberton. In 1949, NC 72 was extended to US 301, replacing part of an old alignment of US 74. In 1983, NC 72 was extended along Fifth Street through Lumberton, then south on Roberts Avenue/Wilmington Highway to its current eastern terminus with US 74.

== Major intersections ==
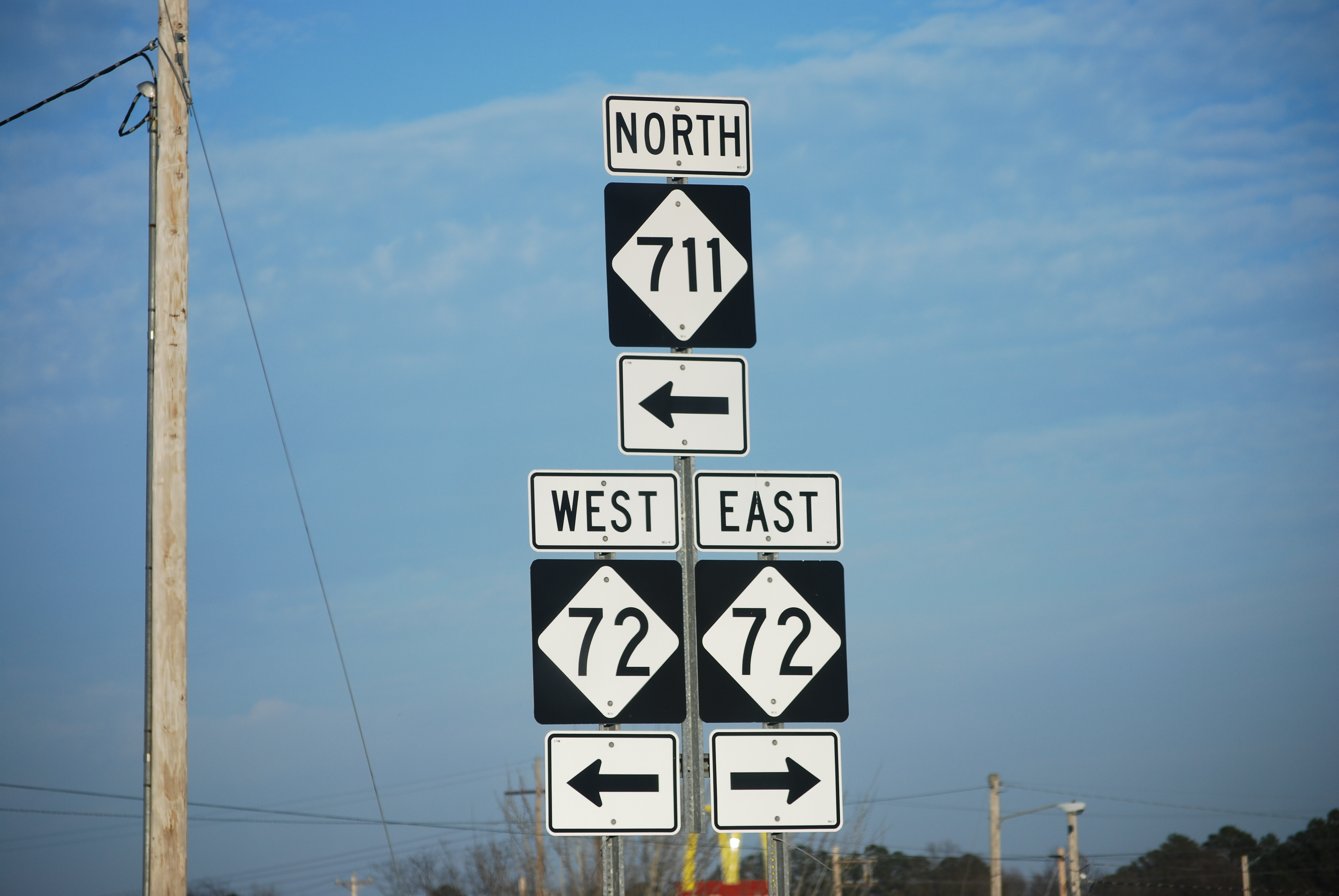
Directional signage at the end of the I-95/US 301 exit ramp

The entire route is in Robeson County.

Location	mi	km	Destinations	Notes
Red Springs	0.0	0.0	NC 211 (4th Avenue / Main Street) / NC 710 begins	West end of NC 710 overlap
	1.8	2.9	NC 710 east – Rowland	East end of NC 710 overlap
Lumberton	16.2	26.1	NC 711 north (Country Club Road) – Pembroke	West end of NC 711 overlap
Lumberton	16.6– 16.8	26.7– 27.0	I-95 / US 301 / NC 711 ends – Rowland, Laurinburg, Fayetteville	East end of NC 711 overlap; exit 17 (I-95)
Lumberton	19.0	30.6	NC 41 south (Martin Luther King Jr. Drive) – Fairmont	West end of NC 41 overlap
Lumberton	21.1	34.0	NC 41 north / NC 211 (East 5th Street / North Roberts Avenue) to I-95 – Red Springs, Bladenboro	East end of NC 41 overlap
	33.0	53.1	US 74 – Laurinburg, Whiteville	Future I-74
1.000 mi = 1.609 km; 1.000 km = 0.621 mi: Concurrency terminus
