= Mill Prong =

Historic house in North Carolina, United States

- U.S. National Register of Historic Places
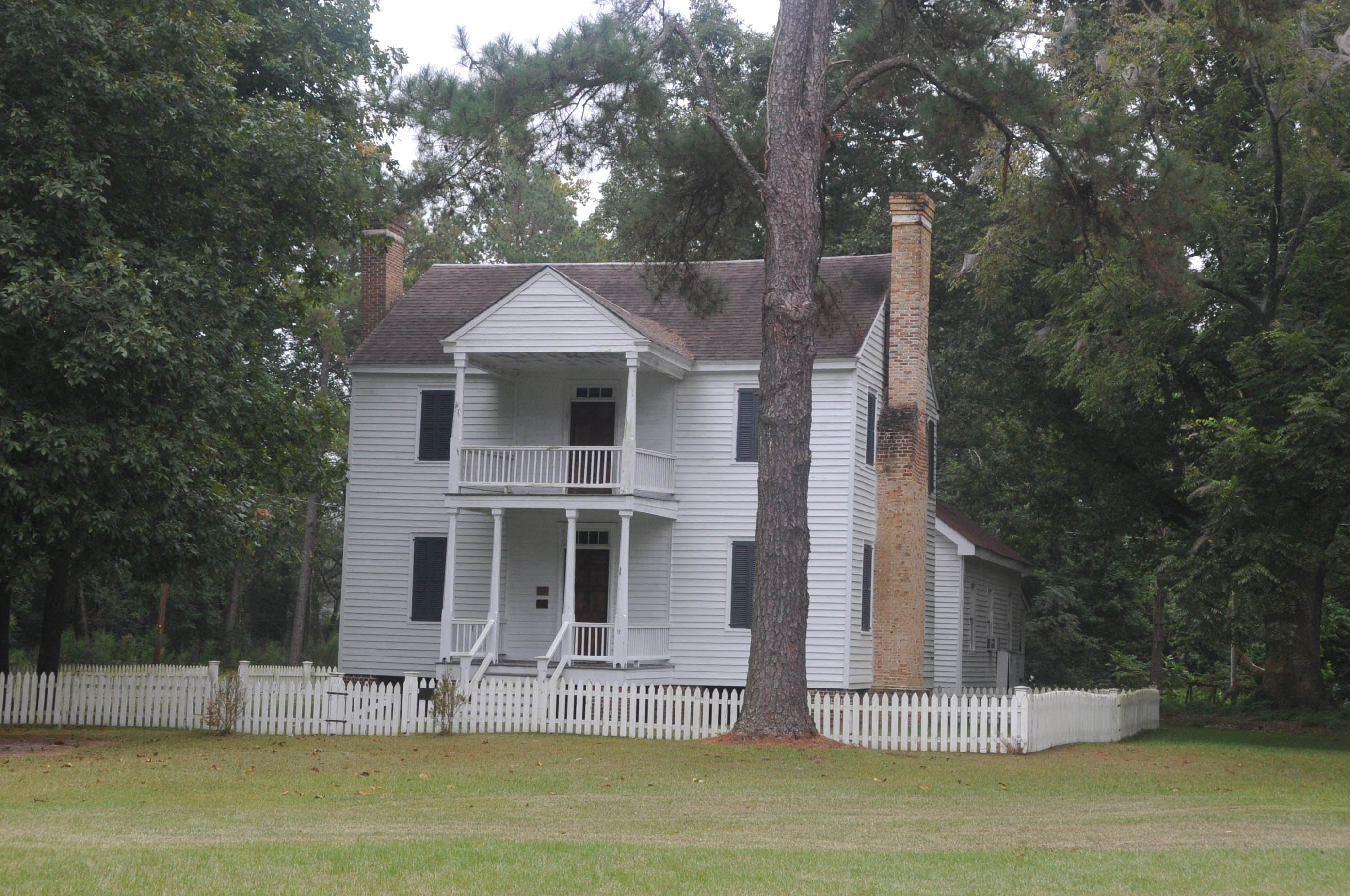
- Mill Prong, March 2007

- Location within North Carolina Location within the United States
- Nearest city: Red Springs, North Carolina
- Coordinates: 34°54′20″N 79°17′17″W
- Area: 118 acres (48 ha)
- Built: 1795
- Architectural style: Federal
- NRHP reference No.: 79001724
- Added to NRHP: December 13, 1979

Mill Prong House is a historic plantation house located near Red Springs, Hoke County, North Carolina. It was built in 1795 by Scottish immigrant John Gilchrist. The name for the house was derived from a stream, the tributary of Raft Swamp.

== Transfer of ownership and modifications ==
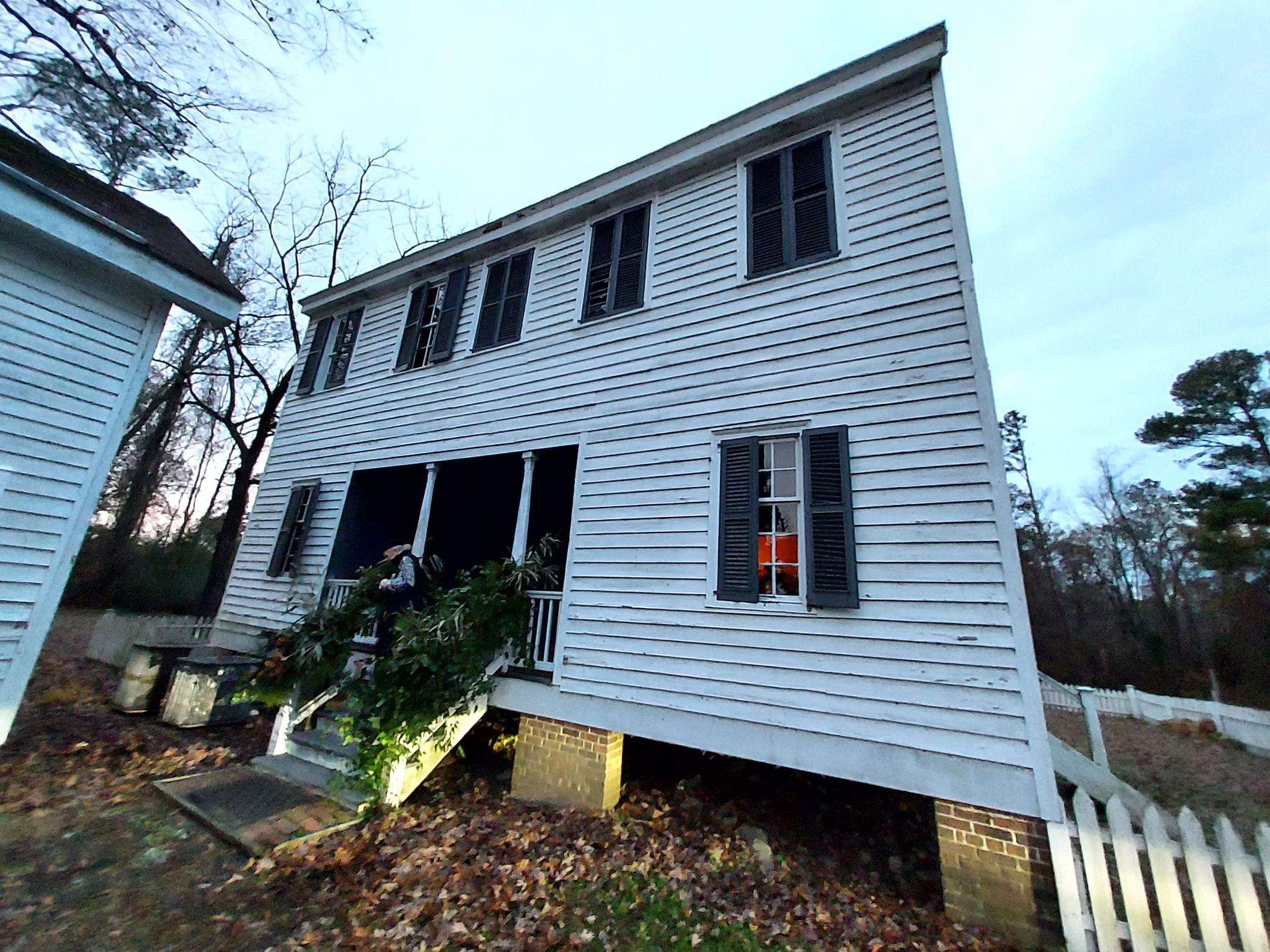
Rear addition on Mill prong house

The home was sold to Archibald McEachern, a fellow Scottish American, in 1834 and was expanded on the back side. The main section is a two-story, three-bay, Federal frame dwelling. It is sheathed in weatherboard and has a gable roof. It features a center bay, two-tier front porch. It was enlarged in the 1830s and in the fourth quarter of the 19th century. Also on the property is the contributing McEachern family cemetery.

Funds from the sell of the house helped establish Floral College, which later became Flora MacDonald College.

== Historic recognition and museum status ==
It was listed on the National Register of Historic Places in 1979. The home now operates as a private museum supported by a non-profit preservation group with monthly open houses.

== In popular culture ==
Rhiannon Giddens, a native of Greensboro, recorded her album What Did the Blackbird Say to the Crow (2025), at Mill Prong. Her former bandmate Justin Robinson, is also featured on the album.
