= Robeson Planetarium and Science Center =

Planetarium in North Carolina, US

- Shown within North Carolina
- Established: January 1969
- Location: Lumberton, North Carolina
- Coordinates: 34.627444°N 79.059334°W
- Type: Planetarium
- Director: Kenneth Brandt

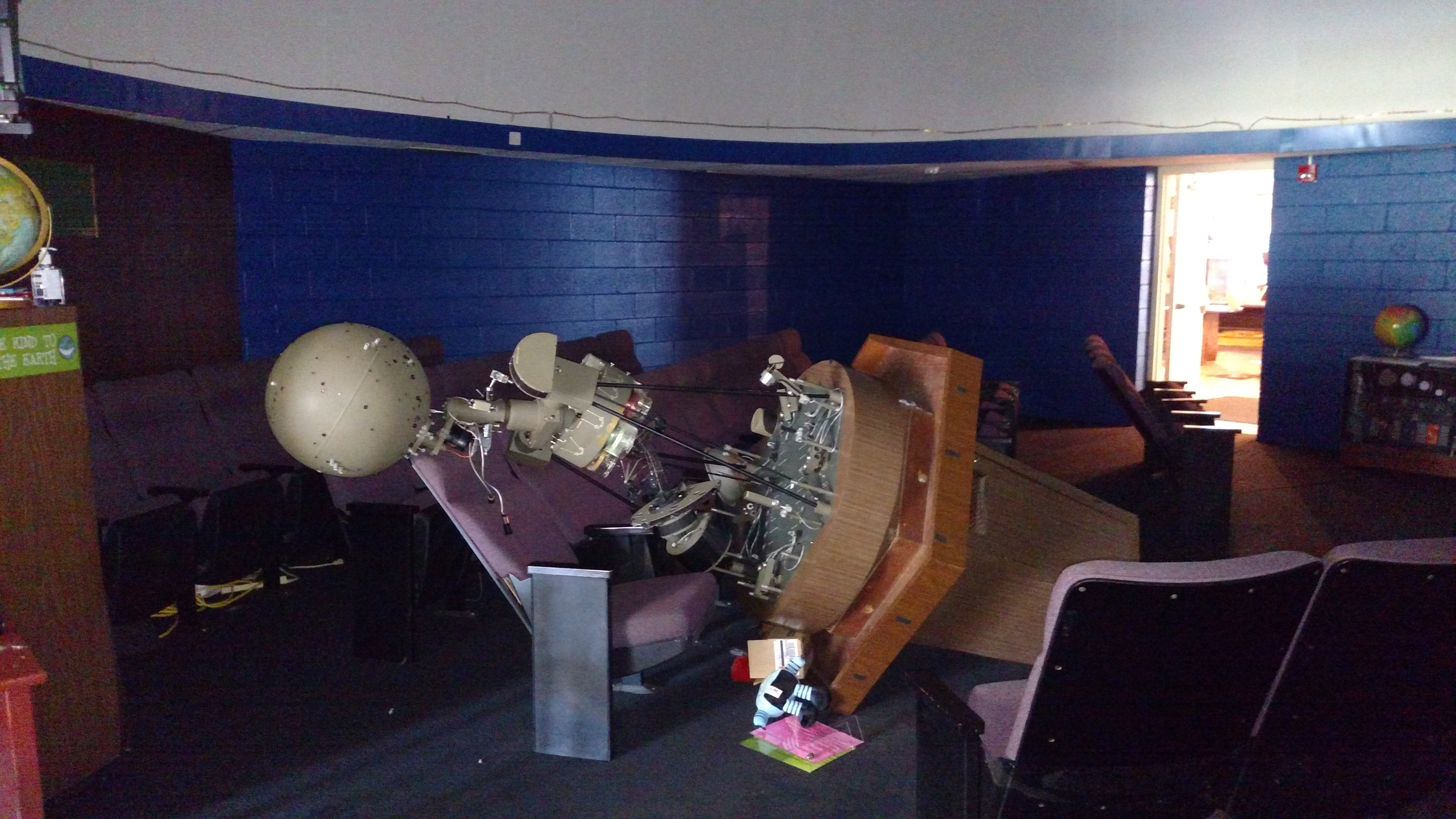
Spitz A3P projector down

The Robeson Planetarium and Science Center is located in Lumberton, North Carolina. It is operated by the Public Schools of Robeson County for instruction in astronomy, geology, physics and other science topics. It is a member of the NASA Museum Alliance, International Planetarium Society, SouthEastern Planetarium Association, and Carolina Association of Planetarium Educators.

The facility has been closed since the building housing the planetarium was destroyed in 2016 by Hurricane Matthew and further damaged by Hurricane Florence in 2018. The county plans to rebuild but lacks funding and has been operating in the schools and at public events using portable equipment since
