= Red Springs, North Carolina =

Red Springs
- Town
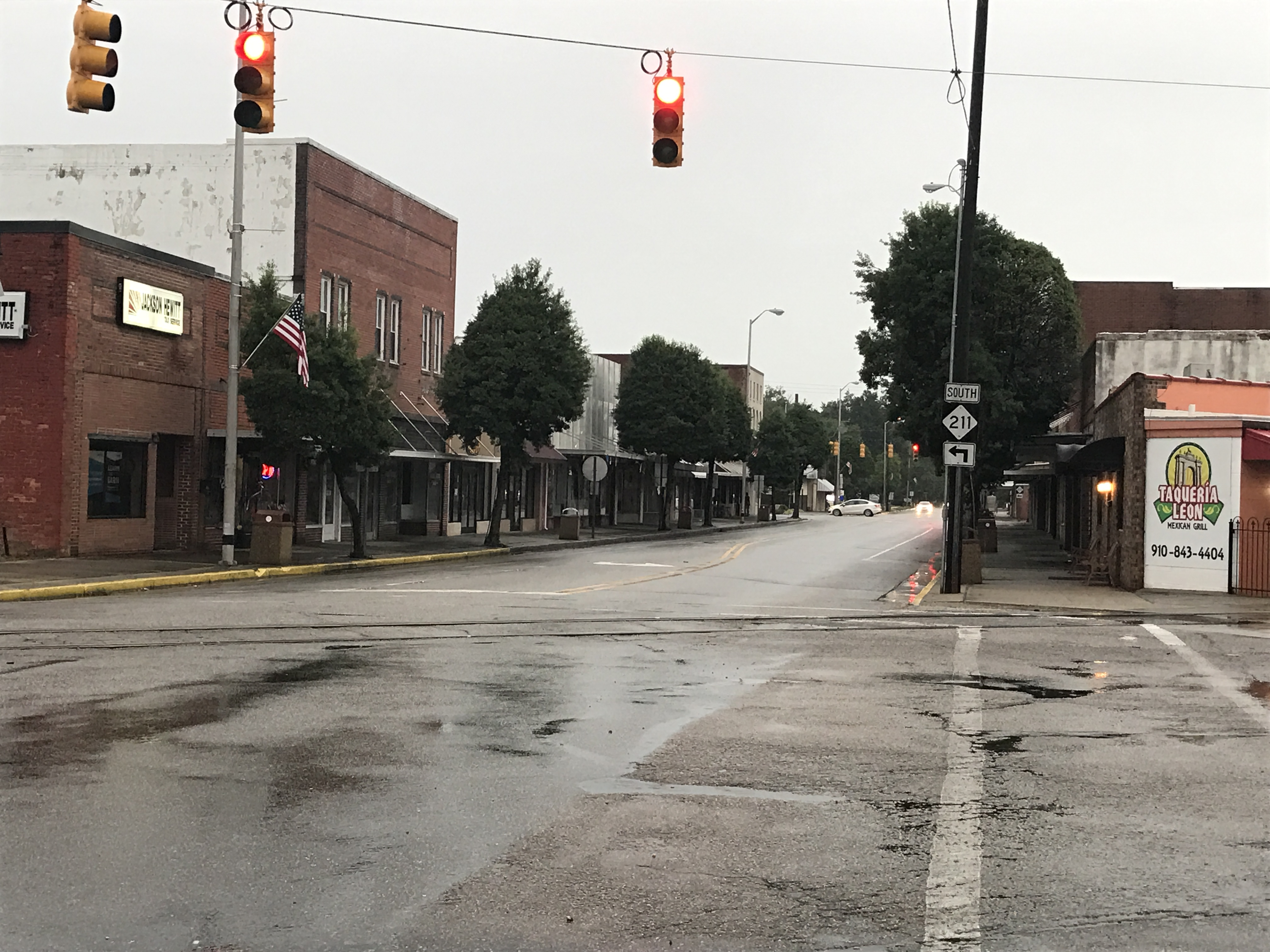
- Main Street

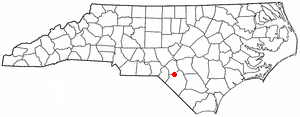
- Location within the state of North Carolina
- Coordinates: 34°48′17″N 79°10′56″W
- Country: United States
- State: North Carolina
- Counties: Robeson

Government
  - Mayor: Ed Henderson

Area
  - Total: 3.67 sq mi (9.50 km^{2})
  - Land: 3.50 sq mi (9.07 km^{2})
  - Water: 0.17 sq mi (0.44 km^{2})
- Elevation: 200 ft (61 m)

Population (2020)
  - Total: 3,087
  - Density: 882/sq mi (340.5/km^{2})
- Time zone: UTC-5 (Eastern (EST))
  - Summer (DST): UTC-4 (EDT)
- ZIP code: 28377
- Area codes: 910, 472
- FIPS code: 37-55660
- GNIS feature ID: 2407187
- Website: www.redsprings.org

Red Springs is a town in Robeson County in the U.S. state of North Carolina. The population was 3,087 at the 2020 census.

== Geography ==
Red Springs is located in northern Robeson County. North Carolina Highways 211 and 71 are the main roads through the town, joining to form North Main Street. NC-211 leads north 12 miles (19 km) to Raeford and southeast 18 miles (29 km) to Lumberton, while NC-71 leads northeast 8 miles (13 km) to Lumber Bridge and southwest 12 miles (19 km) to Maxton. North Carolina Highway 72 leaves Red Springs on South Main Street, leading south via Philadelphus 19 miles (31 km) to Lumberton.

According to the United States Census Bureau, the town of Red Springs has a total area of 3.7 square miles (9.5 km^{2}), of which 3.5 square miles (9.1 km^{2}) are land and 0.2 square miles (0.4 km^{2}), or 4.61%, are water bodies.

== History ==
One of the first settlers in this community was "Sailor Hector" McNeill. It is not known exactly how he got his nickname, but he is found using it in the Bladen County tax lists of 1771. (Red Springs is in Robeson County which was formed from Bladen County in 1787.) "Sailor Hector" McNeill's home was at the top of the hill on the edge of the McNeill cemetery in town, and he and his wife Mary are buried there in unmarked graves. In 1775, McNeill secured a royal land grant from King George III for the area encompassing the eventual town. The 1795 Mill Prong house was built nearby in Hoke County and uses a Red Springs address.

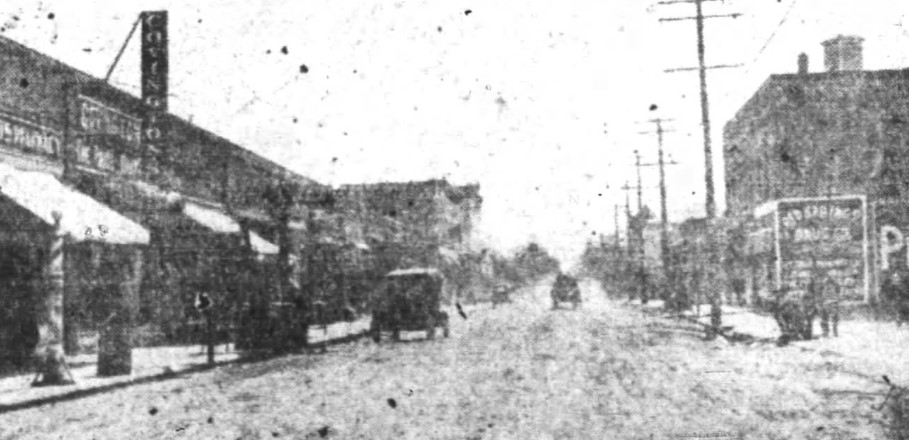
Red Springs, 1915

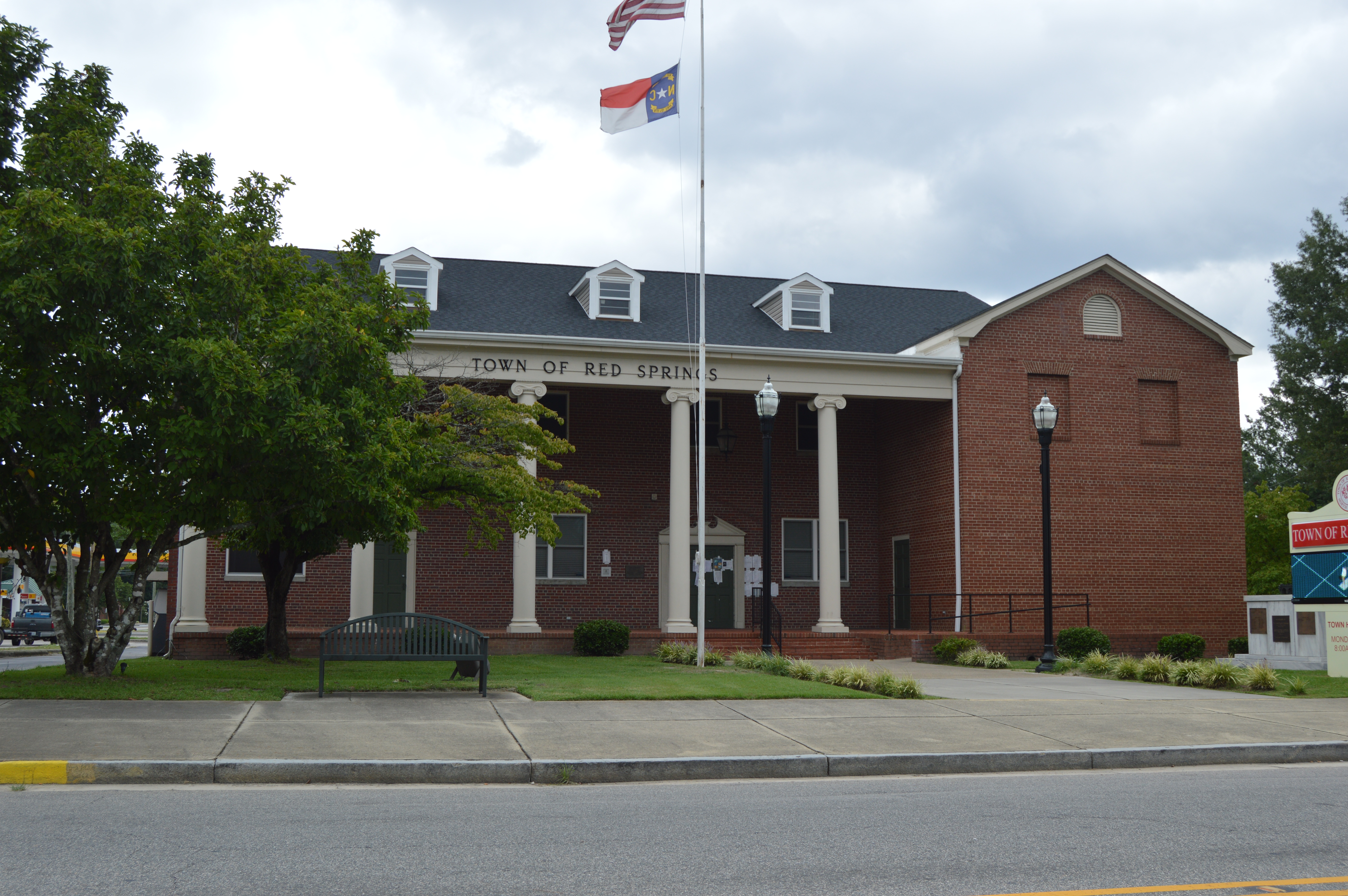
Red Springs town hall

In the mid-1800s the community served as a summer resort, with visitors attracted to its mineral springs. By around 1852, Malcolm McNiell, Hector's grandson, had established a hotel to serve vacationers. It remained in operation until another hotel was built by S. R. Townsend in 1891. A line of the Cape Fear and Yadkin Valley Railway was laid through the community in June 1884, and at about that time a post office was opened under the name Dora. The following year the name of the post office was changed to Red Springs in homage to the rusty color of the spring water. In 1887 the community was incorporated at the impetus of legislator Hamilton McMillan, a resident of the town. The following year the Scottish Chief newspaper was founded. It published there for several years before being moved to Maxton. On February 17, 1906, a large section of the downtown was destroyed by fire.

Between 1896 and 1915, Red Springs had a military school for boys as well as the Southern Conservatory of Music for girls from all over the country. The military school is long gone, but in time the conservatory became Flora McDonald College, known today as Flora McDonald Academy, a private day school. In the 1840s, Floral College for young women was established a few miles south of town by a local lawyer, John Gilchrist Jr. of Mill Prong House. The school operated until the Civil War, reopened afterward, but closed its doors around 1870.

From 1947 to 1950, Red Springs fielded a professional minor league baseball team, the Red Springs Red Robins, that was a farm team of the Philadelphia Athletics. The team won the Tobacco State League championship in 1948. In 1949, led by pitcher Bill Harrington, who would go on to pitch for the big league parent club, the Red Robins won a second title. The 1950 team was led by player/manager Ducky Detweiler, who had played for the Boston Braves.

Professional baseball returned to Red Springs in 1969 when Red Springs Twins played, as the Minnesota Twins organization moved its Class A franchise from Wilson, N.C. During the year the club drew more than 40,000 fans and were managed by Tom Umphlett, a former major leaguer and North Carolina native. Six future major Leaguers were on the Red Springs roster. The team lasted only one season and were featured in Sports Illustrated magazine.

== Demographics ==
Historical population
Census	Pop.	Note	%±
1900	858		—
1910	1,089		26.9%
1920	1,018		−6.5%
1930	1,300		27.7%
1940	1,559		19.9%
1950	2,245		44.0%
1960	2,767		23.3%
1970	3,383		22.3%
1980	3,607		6.6%
1990	3,799		5.3%
2000	3,493		−8.1%
2010	3,428		−1.9%
2020	3,087		−9.9%
U.S. Decennial Census

=== 2020 census ===
As of the 2020 census, Red Springs had a population of 3,087. The median age was 41.7 years. 24.5% of residents were under the age of 18 and 21.9% were 65 years of age or older. For every 100 females, there were 83.4 males, and for every 100 females age 18 and over, there were 78.6 males age 18 and over.

0.0% of residents lived in urban areas, while 100.0% lived in rural areas.

There were 1,309 households in Red Springs, including 777 family households. Of these households, 28.7% had children under the age of 18 living in them. 28.0% were married-couple households, 21.4% were households with a male householder and no spouse or partner present, and 45.4% were households with a female householder and no spouse or partner present. 40.1% of all households were made up of individuals, and 21.0% had someone living alone who was 65 years of age or older.

There were 1,520 housing units, of which 13.9% were vacant. The homeowner vacancy rate was 3.3% and the rental vacancy rate was 5.6%.

Racial composition as of the 2020 census
Race	Number	Percent
White	817	26.5%
Black or African American	1,330	43.1%
American Indian and Alaska Native	476	15.4%
Asian	9	0.3%
Native Hawaiian and Other Pacific Islander	1	0.0%
Some other race	280	9.1%
Two or more races	174	5.6%
Hispanic or Latino (of any race)	382	12.4%

=== 2000 census ===
As of the census of 2000, there were 3,493 people, 1,320 households, and 893 families residing in the town. The population density was 1,233.0 inhabitants per square mile (476.1/km^{2}). There were 1,458 housing units at an average density of 514.7 units per square mile (198.7 units/km^{2}). The racial makeup of the town was 38.19% White, 49.16% African American, 8.65% Native American, 0.34% Asian, 0.14% Pacific Islander, 2.32% from other races, and 1.20% from two or more races. Hispanic or Latino of any race were 3.66% of the population.

There were 1,320 households, out of which 28.0% had children under the age of 18 living with them, 38.5% were married couples living together, 23.6% had a female householder with no husband present, and 32.3% were non-families. 28.7% of all households were made up of individuals, and 15.2% had someone living alone who was 65 years of age or older. The average household size was 2.56 and the average family size was 3.10.

In the town, the population was spread out, with 26.0% under the age of 18, 9.0% from 18 to 24, 23.8% from 25 to 44, 22.8% from 45 to 64, and 18.3% who were 65 years of age or older. The median age was 38 years. For every 100 females, there were 82.1 males. For every 100 females age 18 and over, there were 81.8 males.

The median income for a household in the town was $24,194, and the median income for a family was $34,760. Males had a median income of $25,655 versus $18,974 for females. The per capita income for the town was $15,347. About 26.0% of families and 30.4% of the population were below the poverty line, including 50.6% of those under age 18 and 14.7% of those age 65 or over.

== Works cited ==
- Lawrence, Robert C. (1939). The State of Robeson. Lumberton. OCLC 3570522.
- Tyner, K. Blake (2005). Robeson County in Vintage Postcards. Arcadia Publishing. ISBN 9780738541624.
