= Henry Ward Oxendine =

American lawyer and politician (1940–2020)

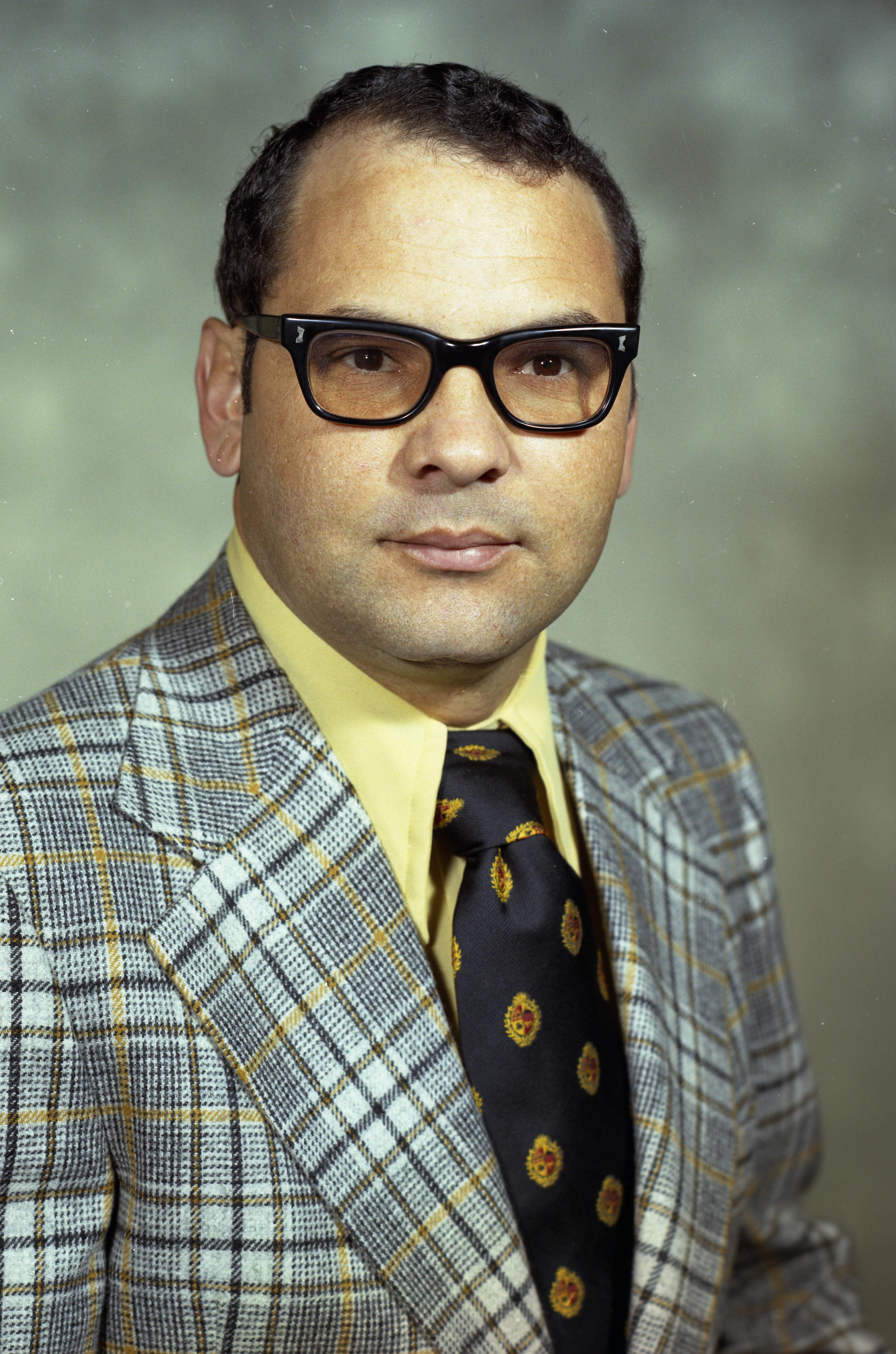

Member of the North Carolina House of Representatives from the 21st District
- In office March 19, 1973 – November 1976
- Preceded by: Frank S. White
- Succeeded by: Horace Locklear

Personal details
- Born: September 4, 1940 Robeson County, North Carolina, United States
- Died: November 19, 2020 (aged 80)
- Party: Democratic Party
- Spouse: Sandra Ransom

Henry Ward Oxendine (September 4, 1940 – November 19, 2020) was an American lawyer and politician who served as a member of the North Carolina House of Representatives for the 21st District from 1973 to 1976. A member of the Lumbee tribe, he was the first Native American to serve in the North Carolina General Assembly.

== Early life ==
Henry Ward Oxendine was born on September 4, 1940, in Robeson County, North Carolina, United States, to Lockey Oxendine and Nancy Locklear Oxendine. He was a member of the Lumbee tribe. He was raised on a farm in the Union Chapel community in Robeson County. He attended Pembroke High School and served in the United States Air Force thereafter. Disappointed by his military life, he enrolled in Pembroke State University, and graduated in 1964 with a Bachelor of Science in social studies. He married Sandra Ransom on August 20, 1965, and had two sons with her. He worked as a school teacher for six years before deciding to study law. Frustrated by the lack of success of Native American candidates for public office in the 1960s, he figured that law school would give him credentials that would assist in a political career. He also concluded that a legal career would give him "more independence" than a teaching career.

== Career ==
In 1973, a member of the North Carolina House of Representatives for the 21st District, Frank S. White, died. On March 15, the district Democratic Party executive committee nominated Oxendine to fill the vacancy. He was subsequently appointed to the office by the Governor of North Carolina and sworn in to his seat on March 19, 1973 by North Carolina Secretary of State Thad Eure in a short ceremony before the legislature began its evening session. He thus became the first Native American to serve in the North Carolina General Assembly. In his first press conference, Oxendine stated, "I hope my appointment will restore some confidence and trust in the democratic system which Indians have lost through years of frustration and disappointment. I hope to help bring about respect and understanding between the races." The Carolina Indian Voice lamented his appointment, suggesting that he was "a fine, sincere man, but he is not necessarily the choice of the people".

By the time Oxendine took his seat, most of the major bills in the legislature's 1973 session had already been proposed. He voted for increased public education appropriations and the creation of a law which mandated the revocation of a driver's license if a motorist refused to take a breathalyzer test. He voted against the holding of a referendum on legalizing liquor-by-the-drink sales, saying that it would risk increased consumption of alcohol and make roadways unsafe. Oxendine was enrolled at North Carolina Central University School of Law at the time of his appointment to the legislature. However, he made an arrangement with the dean whereby he could take his courses when the General Assembly was not in session. He graduated in 1973 with a Juris Doctor. In June 1974, he opened a law practice in Pembroke.

Oxendine was reelected to his seat and placed on the Insurance, Education, Higher Education, Corrections, Base Budget, Human Resources, and Judiciary committees. During the 1975 session, he mostly refrained from proposing new bills and instead cosigned legislation introduced by other representatives, which he supported. He cosigned several measures the Commission on Sentencing Criminal Punishment and Rehabilitation recommended to the legislature aimed at prison reform. He also sponsored a successful bill which allowed a person found guilty of writing a bad check to pay fines and restitution without a court trial. In March 1976, Oxendine announced his intention not to seek reelection to the House but instead to campaign for a judgeship in the 16th Judicial District, though he remained committed to serving the rest of his legislative term through November. He lost the August primary election for the judgeship and was succeeded in the legislature by Horace Locklear.

In March 1977, Governor Jim Hunt appointed Oxendine to represent the 6th Highway Division on the North Carolina Secondary Roads Council. Hunt appointed him to the newly created North Carolina Board of Paroles in July. He was sworn in on July 18. In 2008, he became a judge on the Supreme Court of the Lumbee Tribe.

== Later life ==
Oxendine died on November 19, 2020.

== Works cited ==
- Cheney, John L. Jr., ed. (1975). North Carolina Manual. Raleigh: North Carolina Secretary of State. OCLC 436873840.
- Sider, Gerald M. (2003). Living Indian Histories: Lumbee and Tuscarora People in North Carolina (revised ed.). Chapel Hill: UNC Press Books. ISBN 9780807855065.
