= List of Pi Kappa Alpha chapters =

Pi Kappa Alpha is a North American collegiate social fraternity founded at the University of Virginia in 1868. In the following list of chapters, active chapters are indicated in bold and inactive chapters and institutions are in italics. Pi Kappa Alpha calls its colonies provisional chapters.

Chapter	Charter date and range	Institution	Location	Status	Ref.
Alpha	March 1, 1868 – 1879; 1891 – April 15, 2024	University of Virginia	Charlottesville, Virginia	Inactive	
Beta	March 1, 1869 – 1870; 1894–2012	Davidson College	Davidson, North Carolina	Inactive	
**Gamma**	February 27, 1871 – 1881; 1894–1895; 1897–2019; 2026	College of William & Mary	Williamsburg, Virginia	Active	(Note: Re-established in 1895 by absorbing Psi Theta Psi, established in 1894. It was re-established as a provisional chapter (colony) in November 2024.)
Delta	June 6, 1871 – 1873; 1905–1969	Birmingham–Southern College	Birmingham, Alabama	Inactive	
**Epsilon**	November 11, 1873 – 1880; 1971–1993; 2000	Virginia Tech	Blacksburg, Virginia	Active	(Note: After going dormant, the chapter was re-established in 1971 by absorbing C.O.T. (local), established in 1913.)
**Zeta**	March 23, 1874 – 1875; 1886–1897; 1892–2012; 2018	University of Tennessee	Knoxville, Tennessee	Active	
Eta	January 14, 1879 – 1881; 1903–2009	Tulane University	New Orleans, Louisiana	Inactive	
Theta	October 21, 1878 – April 15, 2024	Rhodes College	Memphis, Tennessee	Provisional	
**Iota**	November 14, 1885 – 2012; 2015	Hampden–Sydney College	Hampden Sydney, Virginia	Active	
**Kappa**	May 1, 1888 – 1888; 1900	Transylvania University	Lexington, Kentucky	Active	
Lambda	January 24, 1889 – 1890	The Citadel	Charleston, South Carolina	Inactive	
**Mu**	December 9, 1890 – 1908; 1921	Presbyterian College	Clinton, South Carolina	Active	(Note: Chapter reformed in 1921 by absorbing O.B.U.M. (local), established in 1920.)
**Nu**	February 23, 1891 – 1906; 1951	Wofford College	Spartanburg, South Carolina	Active	(Note: Chapter was reestablished in 1951 by Beta Nu, established 1951.)
**Xi**	October 22, 1891 – 1897; 1928–1972; 1975–2002; 2007	University of South Carolina	Columbia, South Carolina	Active	(Note: The chapter reformed in 1928 by absorbing Alpha Kappa Pi (local), established in 1927.)
**Omicron**	October 23, 1891 – 1896; 1901–2006; April 19, 2024	University of Richmond	Richmond, Virginia	Active	
**Pi**	February 4, 1892 – 1898; 1901	Washington and Lee University	Lexington, Virginia	Active	
Rho	May 12, 1892 – 1908	Cumberland University	Lebanon, Tennessee	Inactive	
**Sigma**	September 23, 1893 – 1895; 1897–1906; 1921–2010; 2016	Vanderbilt University	Nashville, Tennessee	Active	
**Tau**	February 11, 1895 – 1897; 1899	University of North Carolina at Chapel Hill	Chapel Hill, North Carolina	Active	
**Upsilon**	April 5, 1895	Auburn University	Auburn, Alabama	Active	
**Phi**	October 15, 1896 – 1909; 2021	Roanoke College	Salem, Virginia	Active	(Note: Reformed in 2001 by absorbing I.B.R.C. (local), established in 2000.)
Chi	May 6, 1898 – 1910	Sewanee: The University of the South	Sewanee, Tennessee	Inactive	
**Psi**	March 1, 1900 – 1933; 1998–2018; April 6, 2024	University of North Georgia	Dahlonega, Georgia	Active	
**Omega**	June 5, 1901 – 2014; 2018	University of Kentucky	Lexington, Kentucky	Active	
**Alpha Alpha**	November 26, 1901 – 1971; 1973	Duke University	Durham, North Carolina	Active	
Alpha Beta	March 8, 1902 – 1905; 1947–1951	Centenary College	Shreveport, Louisiana	Inactive	(Note: Chapter reformed in 1947 from Nu Kappa, established in 1947.)
**Alpha Gamma**	December 11, 1903	Louisiana State University	Baton Rouge, Louisiana	Active	
**Alpha Delta**	February 20, 1904	Georgia Tech	Atlanta, Georgia	Active	
**Alpha Epsilon**	October 31, 1904 – 2013; 2019–2020; March 28, 2025	North Carolina State University	Raleigh, North Carolina	Active	
**Alpha Zeta**	November 2, 1904 – 1993; 2000	University of Arkansas	Fayetteville, Arkansas	Active	(Note: Chapter formed from Alpha Phi, established in 1903.)
**Alpha Eta**	November 17, 1904 – 2000; 2001	University of Florida	Gainesville, Florida	Active	
**Alpha Theta**	December 6, 1904 – 1909; 1925–1998; 2003–2018; April 28, 2023	West Virginia University	Morgantown, West Virginia	Active	(Note: Chapter reformed in 1925 from Phi Alpha Pi (local), established in 1923.)
**Alpha Iota**	March 23, 1905 – 2000; 2004	Millsaps College	Jackson, Mississippi	Active	(Note: Chapter formed from 1903 Sphinx Club (local), established in 1903.)
**Alpha Kappa**	November 28, 1905	Missouri University of Science and Technology	Rolla, Missouri	Active	
**Alpha Lambda**	April 19, 1906 – 1921; 1926	Georgetown College	Georgetown, Kentucky	Active	(Note: Chapter formed from Beta Theta Phi, established in 1904. After dormancy, it reformed in 1926 from the Scarab (local), established in 1922.)
**Alpha Mu**	January 25, 1908 – 1915; 1930	University of Georgia	Athens, Georgia	Active	(Note: Chapter reformed in 1930 from Tau Kappa (local), established in 1924.)
Alpha Nu	December 15, 1904 – 2023	University of Missouri	Columbia, Missouri	Inactive	
**Alpha Xi**	May 17, 1910	University of Cincinnati	Cincinnati, Ohio	Active	(Note: Chapter formed from Epsilon Gamma Chi (local), established in 1909.)
**Alpha Omicron**	November 15, 1910 – 1933; 1948	Southwestern University	Georgetown, Texas	Active	(Note: Chapter reformed in 1948 from Pi Chi (local), established in 1947.)
Alpha Pi	March 10, 1911 – 1996	Samford University	Homewood, Alabama	Inactive	(Note: Chapter formed from Sigma Omicron.)
**Alpha Rho**	March 29, 1912 – 1969; 1971–2021	Ohio State University	Columbus, Ohio	Provisional	(Note: Chapter formed from 1908 Delta Kappa, established in 1908. After going dormant, the chapter was re-established as a colony in 2025.)
**Alpha Sigma**	April 1, 1912 – 19xx ?; 1980	University of California, Berkeley	Berkeley, California	Active	(Note: Chapter formed from 1906 Calimidico (local), established in 1906.)
**Alpha Tau**	March 20, 1912	University of Utah	Salt Lake City, Utah	Active	(Note: Chapter formed from Xi Kappa Phi (local), established in 1911.)
Alpha Upsilon	April 12, 1912 – 1933; 1999–2018	New York University	New York City, New York	Inactive	(Note: Chapter formed from Beta Rho (local), established in 1909.)
**Alpha Phi**	February 17, 1913 – 1994; 2000–2018; 2023	Iowa State University	Ames, Iowa	Active	(Note: Chapter formed from 1907 Gamma Theta (local), established in 1907.)
**Alpha Chi**	March 15, 1913 – 2018; 2026	Syracuse University	Syracuse, New York	Active	(Note: Chapter formed from Zeta Rho (local), established in 1904. After going dormant, it reformed as a provisional chapter (colony) in November 2024.)
Alpha Psi	April 17, 1913 – 1960; 1995–2020	Rutgers University–New Brunswick	New Brunswick, New Jersey	Inactive	(Note: Chapter formed from Gamma Sigma (local), established in 1904.)
**Alpha Omega**	June 9, 1913	Kansas State University	Manhattan, Kansas	Active	(Note: Chapter formed by absorbing Phi Gamma Theta (local), established in 1911.)
Beta Alpha	October 11, 1913 – 2022	Pennsylvania State University	University Park, Pennsylvania	Active	(Note: Chapter formed by absorbing Beta Alpha Sigma (local), established in 1912. Later, it absorbed Chi Upsilon Mu.)
**Beta Beta**	May 12, 1914 – 1970; 1981	University of Washington	Seattle, Washington	Active	(Note: Chapter formed from Theta Sigma, established in 1909.)
**Beta Gamma**	June 6, 1914 – 2010; 2016–2019; 2023	University of Kansas	Lawrence, Kansas	Active	(Note: 1909 Chapter formed from Sigma Delta Phi, established in 1909.)
**Beta Delta**	May 22, 1915	University of New Mexico	Albuquerque, New Mexico	Active	(Note: Chapter formed from Alpha Alpha Alpha (local), established in 1903.)
Beta Epsilon	December 17, 1915 – 1960	Western Reserve University	Hudson, Ohio	Inactive	(Note: Chapter formed from Pi Kappa Phi (local, not the national of the same name), established in 1912.)
Beta Zeta	April 11, 1916 – 2018	Southern Methodist University	Dallas, Texas	Inactive	
**Beta Eta**	March 24, 1917	University of Illinois Urbana-Champaign	Champaign, Illinois	Active	(Note: Chapter formed from Phi Alpha Delta (local), established in 1916.)
**Beta Theta**	March 26, 1917 – 2010; 2014	Cornell University	Ithaca, New York	Active	(Note: 1911 Chapter formed from Alpha Theta, 1911.)
Beta Iota	February 17, 1917 – 1932; 1947–1964	Beloit College	Beloit, Wisconsin	Inactive	(Note: Chapter formed from Dew Drop Inn (local), established in 1902.)
**Beta Kappa**	June 19, 1920 – 2006; 2011–2018	Emory University	Atlanta, Georgia	Provisional	(Note: 1919 Chapter formed from Beta Kappa Club, established in 1919. After going dormant, it reformed as a colony in 2023.)
Beta Lambda	December 6, 1919 – 1962	Washington University in St. Louis	St. Louis County, Missouri	Inactive	(Note: Chapter formed from Chi Alpha Pi, established in 1917.)
**Beta Mu**	March 1, 1920	University of Texas at Austin	Austin, Texas	Active	(Note: Chapter formed from Pi K A Club (local), established in 1919.)
**Beta Nu**	May 12, 1920 – 1936; 1947–2000; 2009–2012; 2017	Oregon State University	Corvallis, Oregon	Active	(Note: Chapter formed from Kappa Phi Delta (local), established in 1919.)
**Beta Xi**	May 14, 1920 – 1960; 1980–1994; 2005	University of Wisconsin–Madison	Madison, Wisconsin	Active	(Note: Chapter formed from Delta Phi Epsilon, established in 1916.)
**Beta Omicron**	September 24, 1920 – 2014; 2019	University of Oklahoma	Norman, Oklahoma	Active	(Note: Chapter formed from Pi Kappa Omicron (local), established in 1920.)
Beta Pi	November 30, 1920 – 1992; 1997–2025	University of Pennsylvania	Philadelphia, Pennsylvania	Inactive	(Note: Chapter formed from Alpha Phi Delta (local), established in 1916.)
Beta Rho	December 20, 1920 – 1933	Colorado College	Colorado Springs, Colorado	Inactive	(Note: Chapter formed from Epsilon Sigma Alpha, established in 1917.)
**Beta Sigma**	December 5, 1921	Carnegie Mellon University	Pittsburgh, Pennsylvania	Active	(Note: Chapter formed from Zeta Delta (local), established in 1920)
**Beta Tau**	February 7, 1922 – 1933; 1968–1975; 1993	University of Michigan	Ann Arbor, Michigan	Active	(Note: Chapter formed from Phylon House (local), established in 1915.)
**Beta Upsilon**	February 20, 1922 – 1970; 1988–2014; 2018	University of Colorado Boulder	Boulder, Colorado	Active	(Note: Chapter formed from Omega Psi (local), established in 1917.)
**Beta Phi**	April 12, 1922	Purdue University	West Lafayette, Indiana	Active	(Note: Chapter formed from Emanon (local), established by 1904.)
**Beta Chi**	May 15, 1922 – 1936; May 17, 1986 – 2000; November 8, 2009	University of Minnesota	Minneapolis, Minnesota	Active	(Note: Chapter formed from Alpha Chi Alpha (local), established in 1921.)
Beta Psi	December 1, 1923 – 1941	Mercer University	Macon, Georgia	Inactive	(Note: Chapter formed from Alpha Nu, established in 1922.)
Beta Omega	March 1, 1924 – 1930	Lombard College	Galesburg, Illinois	Inactive	(Note: Chapter formed from Tau Delta Theta, established in 1921. It went dormant in 1930 when Lombard College closed because of the Great Depression.)
**Gamma Alpha**	March 27, 1924	University of Alabama	Tuscaloosa, Alabama	Active	(Note: Chapter formed from Kappa Pi, established in 1922.)
**Gamma Beta**	April 12, 1924 – 1941; 1967–1978; 1999	University of Nebraska–Lincoln	Lincoln, Nebraska	Active	(Note: Chapter formed from Bushnell (local), established in 1910.)
Gamma Gamma	November 16, 1924 – 1972	University of Denver	Denver, Colorado	Inactive	(Note: Chapter formed from Alpha Pi Nu, established in 1913.)
Gamma Delta	December 1, 1925 – 2004; 2009–2021	University of Arizona	Tucson, Arizona	Inactive	(Note: Chapter formed from Pi Alpha Epsilon.)
**Gamma Epsilon**	June 11, 1925	Utah State University	Logan, Utah	Active	(Note: Chapter formed from Pi Zeta Pi (local), established in 1905.)
Gamma Zeta	March 12, 1926 – 1983	Wittenberg University	Springfield, Ohio	Inactive	(Note: Chapter formed from Pi Alpha Epsilon, established in 1922.)
**Gamma Eta**	June 26, 1926 – 1972; 1993	University of Southern California	Los Angeles, California	Active	(Note: Chapter formed from Delta Mu Phi, established in 1922 (local).)
**Gamma Theta**	May 27, 1927	Mississippi State University	Starkville, Mississippi	Active	(Note: Chapter formed from Phi Alpha Alpha, established in 1924.)
Gamma Iota	May 27, 1927–2021	University of Mississippi	Oxford, Mississippi	Inactive	
**Gamma Kappa**	October 12, 1928	Montana State University	Bozeman, Montana	Active	(Note: Chapter formed from Lambda Phi (local), established in 1924.)
Gamma Lambda	October 26, 1929 – 2001; 2010–2018	Lehigh University	Bethlehem, Pennsylvania	Inactive	(Note: Chapter formed from Zeta Chi, established in 1924. The university banned the chapter from campus in 2018 for serving alcohol to minors during an on-campus event and refusing to stop serving the alcohol when told to do so by school officials)
**Gamma Mu**	December 7, 1929 – 1992; 1994–2018; 2023	University of New Hampshire	Durham, New Hampshire	Active	(Note: Chapter formed from Gamma Gamma Gamma (local), established in 1921. It withdrew and became Gamma Gamma Gamma (local) in 1991 and rejoined the fraternity in 1995. After going dormant, it reformed as a colony in Fall of 2021. This chapter chartered in April 2023.)
Gamma Nu	October 26, 1929 – 2004; 2014–2022	University of Iowa	Iowa City, Iowa	Inactive	(Note: Chapter formed from Phi Kappa Rho, established in 1923.)
**Gamma Xi**	December 19, 1929	Washington State University	Pullman, Washington	Active	(Note: Chapter formed from Phi Epsilon (local), established in 1922.)
**Gamma Omicron**	May 16, 1930 – 1974; 1987–2012; 2019	Ohio University	Athens, Ohio	Active	(Note: Chapter formed from Tau Sigma Delta, established in 1922.)
**Gamma Pi**	February 11, 1931 – 1972; 1977–1986; 1994–2012; 2018	University of Oregon	Eugene, Oregon	Active	(Note: Chapter formed from Alpha Beta Chi (local), established in 1922.)
Gamma Rho	February 6, 1932 – 2001; 2003–2022	Northwestern University	Evanston, Illinois	Inactive	(Note: Chapter formed from Phi Nu Beta, established in 1922.)
**Gamma Sigma**	March 3, 1934 – 1974; 19xx ?	University of Pittsburgh	Pittsburgh, Pennsylvania	Active	(Note: Chapter formed from Omega Delta, established in 1924.)
**Gamma Tau**	May 11, 1935	Rensselaer Polytechnic Institute	Troy, New York	Active	(Note: Chapter formed from Beta Psi, established in 1928.)
**Gamma Upsilon**	June 6, 1936	University of Tulsa	Tulsa, Oklahoma	Active	(Note: Chapter formed from Phi Delta, established in 1914.)
**Gamma Phi**	April 17, 1939	Wake Forest University	Winston-Salem, North Carolina	Active	(Note: Chapter formed from Alpha Phi Omega, established in 1920.)
**Gamma Chi**	June 1, 1939	Oklahoma State University–Stillwater	Stillwater, Oklahoma	Active	(Note: Chapter formed from Alpha Kappa Psi, established in 1920.)
**Gamma Psi**	May 4, 1940	Louisiana Tech University	Ruston, Louisiana	Active	(Note: Chapter formed from Sigma Alpha Delta, established in 1937.)
**Gamma Omega**	May 18, 1940 – 2014; 2019	University of Miami	Coral Gables, Florida	Active	(Note: Chapter formed from Phi Alpha, established in 1926.)
Delta Alpha	February 22, 1941 – 1966; 1990–1998; 2004–2020	George Washington University	Washington, D.C.	Inactive	(Note: Chapter formed from Tau Sigma Rho, established in 1938.)
Delta Beta	June 21, 1942 – 1980; 19xx ?–1996; 2005–2021	Bowling Green State University	Bowling Green, Ohio	Inactive	(Note: Chapter formed from the Commoners Club (local), established in 1925.)
**Delta Gamma**	February 15, 1947	Miami University	Oxford, Ohio	Active	
Delta Delta	May 10, 1947 – 1984; 1989–2002; 2011–2021	Florida Southern College	Lakeland, Florida	Inactive	(Note: Chapter formed from Chi Rho, established in 1937.)
**Delta Epsilon**	June 7, 1947 – 1990; 1998	University of Tennessee at Chattanooga	Chattanooga, Tennessee	Active	(Note: Chapter formed from Alpha Lambda Tau, established in 1921.)
Delta Zeta	December 7, 1947 – 2006; 2012–2018	University of Memphis	Memphis, Tennessee	Inactive	(Note: Chapter formed from Phi Lambda Delta, established in 1927.)
**Delta Eta**	March 13, 1948 – 1972; 1975–1998; 2002–2005; 2020	University of Delaware	Newark, Delaware	Active	(Note: Chapter formed from Delta Eta, established in 1947.)
**Delta Theta**	March 13, 1948	Arkansas State University	Jonesboro, Arkansas	Active	(Note: Chapter formed from Kappa Sigma Nu, established in 1935.)
Delta Iota	June 5, 1948 – 2019	Marshall University	Huntington, West Virginia	Inactive	(Note: Chapter formed from Phi Kappa Nu, established in 1927.)
Delta Kappa	November 27, 1948 – 1972; 1974–1987; 2014–2024	San Diego State University	San Diego, California	Inactive	(Note: Chapter formed from Delta Pi Beta, established in 1928.)
**Delta Lambda**	March 5, 1949 – 1988; 2001	Florida State University	Tallahassee, Florida	Active	(Note: Chapter formed from Pi Kappa, established in 1947.)
**Delta Mu**	December 10, 1949 – 2014; 2019	University of Southern Mississippi	Hattiesburg, Mississippi	Active	
**Delta Nu**	February 4, 1950	Wayne State University	Detroit, Michigan	Active	(Note: Chapter formed from Delta Nu, established in 1947.)
**Delta Xi**	February 11, 1950 – 1954; 1965–2001; 2007	Indiana University Bloomington	Bloomington, Indiana	Active	(Note: Chapter formed from Pi Kappa, established in 1948.)
Delta Omicron	February 25, 1950 – 1974; 1975–2016	Drake University	Des Moines, Iowa	Inactive	(Note: Chapter formed from Delta Xi, established in 1949.)
Delta Pi	March 4, 1950 – 1973; 2002–2019	San Jose State University	San Jose, California	Inactive	(Note: Chapter formed from Sigma Gamma Omega, established in 1928.)
**Delta Rho**	March 12, 1950	Linfield University	McMinnville, Oregon	Active	(Note: Chapter formed from Iota Omega Mu, established in 1922.)
**Delta Sigma**	May 6, 1950	Bradley University	Peoria, Illinois	Active	(Note: Chapter formed from Sigma Beta, established in 1948.)
**Delta Tau**	March 31, 1951 – 2008; 2014	Arizona State University	Tempe, Arizona	Active	
**Delta Upsilon**	March 31, 1951 – 1990; 2010	Stetson University	DeLand, Florida	Active	(Note: Chapter formed from Pi Alpha, established in 1949.)
Delta Phi	April 28, 1951 – 1964	Colorado School of Mines	Golden, Colorado	Inactive	(Note: Chapter formed from Pi Kappa, established in 1950.)
**Delta Chi**	February 23, 1952	University of Nebraska Omaha	Omaha, Nebraska	Active	(Note: Chapter formed from Theta Delta Phi, established 1916.)
Delta Psi	June 8, 1952 – 1993; 1998–2012; 2017–October 2021	University of Maryland, College Park	College Park, Maryland	Inactive	(Note: Chapter formed from Alpha Alpha, established in 1949. The university suspended the chapter in 2021 following allegations of sexual assault.)
Delta Omega	February 7, 1953 - November 2025	High Point University	High Point, North Carolina	Inactive	(Note: Chapter formed from Delta Beta Alpha, established in 1947.)
**Epsilon Alpha**	May 2, 1953 – 1974; 1976	Trinity College	Hartford, Connecticut	Active	(Note: Chapter formed from Tau Alpha, established in 1949.)
**Epsilon Beta**	May 9, 1953 – 1998; 2017	Valparaiso University	Valparaiso, Indiana	Active	(Note: Chapter formed from Kappa Delta Pi (local), established in 1919.)
**Epsilon Gamma**	May 16, 1953 – 2008; 2012	Texas Tech University	Lubbock, Texas	Active	(Note: Chapter formed from Las Comrades (local), established in 1929.)
**Epsilon Delta**	March 12, 1955 – 1993; 2008	University of North Texas	Denton, Texas	Active	(Note: Chapter formed from Pi Phi Pi, established 1929.)
**Epsilon Epsilon**	April 30, 1955 – 1996; 2002	University of Toledo	Toledo, Ohio	Active	(Note: Chapter formed from Phi Kappa Chi, established in 1915.)
**Epsilon Zeta**	May 14, 1955 – 2018	East Tennessee State University	Johnson City, Tennessee	Provisional	(Note: Chapter formed from Sigma Phi Alpha, established in 1950. After going dormant, it reformed as a colony in 2023.)
Epsilon Eta	February 4, 1956 – 2018	University of Houston	Houston, Texas	Inactive	(Note: Chapter formed from Sigma Alpha Chi, established in 1945.)
Epsilon Theta	November 10, 1956 – 1974; 1983–2016	Colorado State University	Fort Collins, Colorado	Inactive	
**Epsilon Iota**	May 3, 1958	Southeast Missouri State University	Cape Girardeau, Missouri	Active	(Note: Chapter formed from the Mark Twain Society (local), established in 1931.)
**Epsilon Kappa**	May 10, 1958	Lamar University	Beaumont, Texas	Active	(Note: Chapter formed from Sigma Phi Gamma, established in 1956.)
**Epsilon Lambda**	May 17, 1958	Murray State University	Murray, Kentucky	Active	(Note: Chapter formed from Tau Sigma Tau, established in 1950.)
Epsilon Mu	May 17, 1958 – 1974; 1986–2000; 2003–2019	East Carolina University	Greenville, North Carolina	Active	(Note: Chapter formed from Phi Kappa Alpha, established in 1956.)
**Epsilon Nu**	February 25, 1960	Georgia State University	Atlanta, Georgia	Active	(Note: Chapter formed from Pi Alpha (local), established in 1956.)
Epsilon Xi	May 21, 1960–1998	Case Western Reserve University	Cleveland, Ohio	Inactive	(Note: Chapter formed from Pi Kappa Epsilon, established in 1958)
**Epsilon Omicron**	December 17, 1960 – 2010; 2015	Stephen F. Austin State University	Nacogdoches, Texas	Active	(Note: Chapter formed from Lambda Gamma, established in 1948.)
**Epsilon Pi**	February 4, 1961 – 1992; 2009	Sam Houston State University	Huntsville, Texas	Active	(Note: Chapter formed from Chi Gamma Iota, established in 1959.)
Epsilon Rho	May 20, 1961 – 1970	Idaho State University	Pocatello, Idaho	Inactive	
**Epsilon Sigma**	December 9, 1961	University of Tennessee at Martin	Martin, Tennessee	Active	(Note: Chapter formed from Pi Kappa, established in 1960.)
Epsilon Tau	November 17, 1962 – 1990	Eastern New Mexico University	Portales, New Mexico	Inactive	(Note: Chapter formed from Tau Kappa Tau, established in 1939.)
**Epsilon Upsilon**	December 1, 1962	Gannon University	Erie, Pennsylvania	Active	(Note: Chapter formed from Alpha Kappa Pi, established in 1960.)
**Epsilon Phi**	February 23, 1963	University of Central Arkansas	Conway, Arkansas	Active	(Note: Chapter formed from Chi Nu (local), established in 1923.)
**Epsilon Chi**	April 6, 1963	Pittsburg State University	Pittsburg, Kansas	Active	(Note: Chapter formed from Delta Chi Omicron, established in 1961.)
**Epsilon Psi**	April 27, 1963 – 1996; 2014	Western Michigan University	Kalamazoo, Michigan	Active	(Note: Chapter formed from Pi Kappa Lambda, established in 1961.)
**Epsilon Omega**	October 25, 1963	East Central University	Ada, Oklahoma	Active	(Note: Chapter formed from Tau Sigma Tau, established in 1961.)
**Zeta Alpha**	November 10, 1963	Kettering University	Flint, Michigan	Active	(Note: Chapter formed from Phi Kappa Epsilon, established in 1928.)
**Zeta Beta**	December 15, 1963	Delta State University	Cleveland, Mississippi	Active	(Note: Chapter formed from Kappa Tau Delta, established in 1960.)
Zeta Gamma	April 12, 1964 – 2022	Eastern Illinois University	Charleston, Illinois	Inactive	(Note: Chapter formed from Kappa Sigma Kappa, established in 1947.)
Zeta Delta	May 3, 1964 – 1973	Parsons College	Fairfield, Iowa	Inactive	(Note: Chapter formed from Pi Kappa Lambda, established in 1963. It went inactive when Parsons College closed in 1973.)
**Zeta Epsilon**	February 6, 1965	Western Kentucky University	Bowling Green, Kentucky	Active	(Note: Chapter formed from Lambda Sigma Epsilon.)
Zeta Zeta	March 13, 1965 – 1990	Southwestern Oklahoma State University	Weatherford, Oklahoma	Inactive	(Note: Chapter formed from Beta Tau Beta, established in 1946.)
Zeta Eta	May 15, 1965 – 2021	University of Arkansas at Little Rock	Little Rock, Arkansas	Inactive	
**Zeta Theta**	December 5, 1965 – 2004; 2010–2018; November 2023	Texas State University	San Marcos, Texas	Active	(Note: Chapter formed from Pi Sigma Chi, established in 1904.)
**Zeta Iota**	February 13, 1966 – 1986; 1995	Old Dominion University	Norfolk, Virginia	Active	(Note: Chapter formed from Delta Omega Phi, established in 1937.)
**Zeta Kappa**	April 24, 1966	Ferris State University	Big Rapids, Michigan	Active	(Note: Chapter formed from Sigma Alpha Delta, established in 1921.)
**Zeta Lambda**	May 8, 1966 – 1978; 2014	Adrian College	Adrian, Michigan	Active	(Note: Chapter formed from Psi Sigma Rho (local), established in 1963.)
**Zeta Mu**	May 14, 1966 – 2008; 2013	University of Idaho	Moscow, Idaho	Active	
Zeta Nu	November 18, 1966 – 1978	Eastern Washington University	Cheney, Washington	Inactive	(Note: Chapter formed from Kappa Chi Lambda, established in 1963.)
**Zeta Xi**	February 12, 1967 – 2015; 2021	Western Carolina University	Cullowhee, North Carolina	Active	(Note: Chapter formed from Sigma Phi Kappa, established in 1965.)
**Zeta Omicron**	May 21, 1967 – 2015; May 6, 2023	California State University, Northridge	Los Angeles, California	Active	
**Zeta Pi**	March 1, 1968	University of South Florida	Tampa, Florida	Active	(Note: Chapter formed from Delta Tau, established in 1966.)
**Zeta Rho**	March 1, 1968	University of North Dakota	Grand Forks, North Dakota	Active	
**Zeta Sigma**	March 1, 1968	Florida Institute of Technology	Melbourne, Florida	Active	(Note: Chapter formed from Alpha Kappa Pi, established in 1965.)
**Zeta Tau**	February 9, 1969 – 2012; 2018	Eastern Kentucky University	Richmond, Kentucky	Active	(Note: Chapter formed from Alpha Kappa Pi, established in 1967.)
Zeta Upsilon	February 15, 1969 – 1986	Concord University	Athens, West Virginia	Inactive	(Note: Chapter formed by absorbing Phi Delta Pi, established in 1922.)
Zeta Phi	May 4, 1969 – 2020	University of Missouri–St. Louis	St. Louis, Missouri	Inactive	(Note: Chapter formed from Delta Xi Kappa, established in 1967.)
**Zeta Chi**	May 11, 1969 – 2004; 2012	Missouri State University	Springfield, Missouri	Active	
Zeta Psi	May 10, 1969 – 1987	Nicholls State University	Thibodaux, Louisiana	Inactive	(Note: Chapter formed from Samurai (local).)
Zeta Omega	May 11, 1969 – 1990; 2007–2022	University of Louisiana at Lafayette	Lafayette, Louisiana	Inactive	
**Eta Alpha**	February 1, 1970 – 2004; 2007–2016; 2020	Clemson University	Clemson, South Carolina	Active	(Note: Chapter formed from Sigma Alpha Zeta, established in 1959.)
Eta Beta	February 15, 1970 – 2000	Seton Hall University	South Orange, New Jersey	Inactive	
Eta Gamma	March 1, 1970 – 1972	University of Windsor	Windsor, Ontario, Canada	Inactive	
Eta Delta	May 24, 1970 – 1982	Massachusetts Institute of Technology	Cambridge, Massachusetts	Inactive	
**Eta Epsilon**	February 19, 1971	Angelo State University	San Angelo, Texas	Active	(Note: Chapter formed from Phi Sigma, established in 1967.)
Eta Zeta	March 30, 1971 – 2012	Middle Tennessee State University	Murfreesboro, Tennessee	Inactive	(Note: Chapter formed from Sigma Pi Alpha (local), established in 1969.)
Eta Eta	March 28, 1971 – 1986; 2001–2020	Morehead State University	Morehead, Kentucky	Inactive	(Note: Chapter formed from Gamma Theta Lambda (local), established in 1962.)
Eta Theta	April 18, 1971 – 2008	Weber State University	Ogden, Utah	Inactive	(Note: Chapter formed from Alpha Rho Omega, established in 1940.)
Eta Iota	May 2, 1971 – 1976	Woodbury University	Burbank, California	Inactive	(Note: Chapter formed from Gamma Sigma Pi.)
**Eta Kappa**	May 8, 1971 – 1975; 1977	University of South Alabama	Mobile, Alabama	Active	(Note: Chapter formed from Delta Kappa Pi, established in the 1960s.)
Eta Lambda	May 8, 1971 – 1974	Robert Morris University	Moon Township, Pennsylvania	Inactive	(Note: Chapter formed from Sigma Delta Phi, established in 1961.)
Eta Mu	May 15, 1971 – 1982; 2007–2021	Georgia Southern University–Armstrong Campus	Savannah, Georgia	Inactive	(Note: Chapter formed from Sigma Kappa Chi, established in 1935.)
Eta Nu	May 23, 1971 – 2014	Northern Illinois University	DeKalb, Illinois	Inactive	(Note: Chapter formed from Delta Tau Omega, established in 1968.)
Eta Xi	February 5, 1972 – 1986	University of Alabama at Birmingham	Birmingham, Alabama	Inactive	(Note: Chapter formed from Alpha Kappa Pi, established in 1970.)
**Eta Omicron**	March 18, 1972	University of Louisiana at Monroe	Monroe, Louisiana	Active	(Note: Chapter formed from Alpha Kappa Pi (local), established in 1970.)
**Eta Pi**	March 25, 1972 – 1982; 2012	University of West Florida	Pensacola, Florida	Active	(Note: Chapter formed from Omega Kappa Alpha.)
**Eta Rho**	March 15, 1972	Northern Kentucky University	Highland Heights, Kentucky	Active	(Note: Chapter formed from Alpha Kappa Tau.)
**Eta Sigma**	May 6, 1972 – 1996; 2001	University of West Georgia	Carrollton, Georgia	Active	(Note: Chapter formed from the Cavaliers (local), established in 1968. After going dormant, it reformed from the Cavaliers (local), established in 1995.)
**Eta Tau**	May 6, 1972 – 2010; 2015	Austin Peay State University	Clarksville, Tennessee	Active	(Note: Chapter formed from Phi Delta, established in 1970.)
**Eta Upsilon**	January 26, 1973 – 2000; 2006	University of Texas at Arlington	Arlington, Texas	Active	(Note: Chapter formed from Alpha Kappa Pi, established in 1971.)
**Eta Phi**	February 24, 1973 – 2006; 2026	University of Central Florida	Orlando, Florida	Active	(Note: Chapter formed from Alpha Kappa Pi, established in 1917.)
Eta Chi	February 24, 1973 – 1978	Valencia College	Orlando, Florida	Inactive	(Note: Chapter formed from Phi Chi Omicron.)
Eta Psi	December 8, 1973 – 1982	Texas Wesleyan University	Fort Worth, Texas	Inactive	(Note: Chapter formed from Illotus Drodecim (local), established in 1943.)
Eta Omega	February 9, 1974 – 1986; 2010–2014	University of North Carolina at Pembroke	Pembroke, North Carolina	Inactive	(Note: Chapter formed from Lambda Phi Epsilon (local), established in 1968.)
**Theta Alpha**	March 30, 1974	University of North Alabama	Florence, Alabama	Active	
Theta Beta	April 7, 1974 – 2012	University of Montevallo	Montevallo, Alabama	Inactive	(Note: Chapter formed from Pi Alpha Meisters (local), established in 1959.)
**Theta Gamma**	April 27, 1974	Georgia College & State University	Milledgeville, Georgia	Active	(Note: Chapter formed from Phi Sigma Delta, established in 1972.)
**Theta Delta**	May 19, 1974 – 2004; 2022	Francis Marion University	Florence, South Carolina	Active	(Note: Chapter formed from the Squires (local), established in 1971.·)
**Theta Epsilon**	March 8, 1975	Northeastern State University	Tahlequah, Oklahoma	Active	
Theta Zeta	October 11, 1975 – 2022	University of Northern Iowa	Cedar Falls, Iowa	Inactive	
Theta Eta	February 14, 1976 – 1996	Loyola Marymount University	Los Angeles, California	Inactive	
**Theta Theta**	April 24, 1976 – 2000; 2011	Texas A&M University	College Station, Texas	Active	
Theta Iota	April 25, 1976 – 1986	Tyler Junior College	Tyler, Texas	Inactive	(Note: Chapter formed from Sigma Delta Nu, established in 1968.)
**Theta Kappa**	April 9, 1977	Indiana University Southeast	New Albany, Indiana	Active	
Theta Lambda	April 16, 1977 – 2012; 2017–2019	Creighton University	Omaha, Nebraska	Inactive	
**Theta Mu**	April 16, 1977 – 2012; 2008–2018	University of Massachusetts Amherst	Amherst, Massachusetts	Active	(Note: After going dormant, the chapter reformed as a colony in 2024.)
Theta Nu	April 30, 1977 – 2010	Baylor University	Waco, Texas	Inactive	(Note: Chapter formed from Alpha Kappa Pi, established in 1976.)
**Theta Xi**	March 25, 1978	East Texas A&M University	Commerce, Texas	Active	(Note: Texas A&M University at Commerce changed its name to East Texas A&M University on 7 November 2024.)
**Theta Omicron**	March 3, 1979	Indiana State University	Terre Haute, Indiana	Active	
**Theta Pi**	March 24, 1979	University of Alabama in Huntsville	Huntsville, Alabama	Active	
**Theta Rho**	March 29, 1980 – 2010; 2019	Northern Arizona University	Flagstaff, Arizona	Active	
Theta Sigma	April 5, 1980 – May 2, 2023	Winthrop University	Rock Hill, South Carolina	Inactive	
Theta Tau	April 25, 1981 – 2022	California State University, Sacramento	Sacramento, California	Inactive	
**Theta Upsilon**	May 16, 1981	Tennessee Tech	Cookeville, Tennessee	Active	(Note: Chapter formed from Iota Tau Epsilon, established in 1979.)
Theta Phi	April 24, 1982 – 2000	Wichita State University	Wichita, Kansas	Inactive	
Theta Chi	January 28, 1984 – 2000	Villanova University	Villanova, Pennsylvania	Provisional	(Note: Chapter formed from Delta Pi Epsilon, established in 1908.)
**Theta Psi**	March 14, 1985	Chapman University	Orange, California	Active	(Note: Chapter formed from Pi Kappa, established in 1983.)
**Theta Omega**	May 3, 1985 – June 30, 2024	University of California, Davis	Davis, California	Inactive	
**Iota Alpha**	April 24, 1986 – 2014; 2016	University of Wyoming	Laramie, Wyoming	Active	
**Iota Beta**	December 6, 1986	California State University, Fresno	Fresno, California	Active	
**Iota Gamma**	May 10, 1987	University of Nebraska at Kearney	Kearney, Nebraska	Active	
**Iota Delta**	January 30, 1988	Rose–Hulman Institute of Technology	Terre Haute, Indiana	Active	
Iota Epsilon	March 18, 1988 – 1996; 2009–2025	California State University, Long Beach	Long Beach, California	Inactive	
Iota Zeta	April 16, 1988 – 2004	Randolph–Macon College	Ashland, Virginia	Inactive	
Iota Eta	November 12, 1988 – 2004	University of Nevada, Reno	Reno, Nevada	Inactive	
Iota Theta	April 7, 1989 – 2018	California Polytechnic State University, San Luis Obispo	San Luis Obispo, California	Provisional	
**Iota Iota**	May 12, 1989	Michigan State University	East Lansing, Michigan	Active	
Iota Kappa	September 23, 1989 – 2010	University of California, Santa Barbara	Santa Barbara, California	Inactive	
Iota Lambda	January 26, 1990 – 2019	Columbia University	New York City, New York	Inactive	
Iota Mu	April 14, 1990 – April 20, 2004	Southern Illinois University Carbondale	Carbondale, Illinois	Inactive	(Note: The university permanently suspended the chapter for violations related to the drowning of a freshman.)
**Iota Nu**	April 28, 1990 – 2008	Saint Louis University	St. Louis, Missouri	Provisional	
**Iota Xi**	August 10, 1990 – 2006; 2021	University of Chicago	Chicago, Illinois	Active	
**Iota Omicron**	April 13, 1991	Santa Clara University	Santa Clara, California	Active	
**Iota Pi**	May 24, 1991 – 2016	University of California, Los Angeles	Los Angeles, California	Provisional	
Iota Rho	September 21, 1992 – 2012	Saint Joseph's University	Philadelphia, Pennsylvania	Inactive	
**Iota Sigma**	March 22, 1992	James Madison University	Harrisonburg, Virginia	Active	
Iota Tau	April 10, 1993 – 2016	Johns Hopkins University	Baltimore, Maryland	Inactive	
Iota Upsilon	June 26, 1993–	Georgia Southern University	Statesboro, Georgia	Active	
Iota Phi	December 11, 1993 – 2000	University of Montana	Missoula, Montana	Inactive	
Iota Chi	February 5, 1994 – 2016	University of Connecticut	Storrs, Connecticut	Inactive	
**Iota Psi**	April 2, 1994	Appalachian State University	Boone, North Carolina	Active	
**Iota Omega**	April 9, 1994	University of Western Ontario	London, Ontario, Canada	Active	
**Kappa Alpha**	April 23, 1994 – 2016	Illinois State University	Normal, Illinois	Provisional	(Note: Reestablished as a provisional chapter (colony) in November 2023.)
Kappa Beta	May 15, 1994 – 2010	Princeton University	Princeton, New Jersey	Inactive	
**Kappa Gamma**	May 21, 1994 – 2014; April 21, 2024	Florida International University	Miami, Florida	Active	
**Kappa Delta**	June 25, 1994	Northeastern University	Boston, Massachusetts	Active	
**Kappa Epsilon**	December 17, 1994	Rockhurst University	Kansas City, Missouri	Active	(Note: Chapter formed from Lambda Sigma Chi (local), established in 1992.)
**Kappa Zeta**	January 21, 1995	University of Louisville	Louisville, Kentucky	Active	
**Kappa Eta**	March 25, 1995	New Mexico State University	Las Cruces, New Mexico	Active	
**Kappa Theta**	September 30, 1995	George Mason University	Fairfax, Virginia	Active	
**Kappa Iota**	October 13, 1995 – 2000; 2009	University of Rhode Island	Kingston, Rhode Island	Active	
**Kappa Kappa**	February 24, 1996 – 2014; 2025	University of North Carolina at Charlotte	Charlotte, North Carolina	Active	
Kappa Lambda	March 16, 1996 – 2016	Western Illinois University	Macomb, Illinois	Inactive	
**Kappa Mu**	March 23, 1996	Wilfrid Laurier University and University of Waterloo	Waterloo, Ontario, Canada	Active	
**Kappa Nu**	April 13, 1996	University of the Pacific	Stockton, California	Active	
Kappa Xi	November 16, 1996 – 2004	University at Albany, SUNY	Albany, New York	Inactive	
**Kappa Omicron**	January 18, 1997	University of Nevada, Las Vegas	Paradise, Nevada	Active	
**Kappa Pi**	March 15, 1997	University of South Dakota	Vermillion, South Dakota	Active	
Kappa Rho	April 19, 1997 – 2006; 2016 – 2018	Coastal Carolina University	Conway, South Carolina	Inactive	
Kappa Sigma	April 26, 1997 – 2020	Slippery Rock University	Slippery Rock, Pennsylvania	Inactive	
Kappa Tau	May 3, 1997 – 2016	University of Maine	Orono, Maine	Inactive	
**Kappa Upsilon**	October 18, 1997	American University	Washington, D.C.	Active	
**Kappa Phi**	November 1, 1997	University of California, San Diego	San Diego, California	Active	
Kappa Chi	September 19, 1998 – 2004	Plymouth State University	Plymouth, New Hampshire	Inactive	
**Kappa Psi**	October 3, 1998 – 2012; 2019	California State Polytechnic University, Pomona	Pomona, California	Active	
**Kappa Omega**	December 12, 1998 – 2018; February 12, 2024	University of Wisconsin–Whitewater	Whitewater, Wisconsin	Active	
Lambda Alpha	January 22, 2000 – 2016	University of California, Riverside	Riverside, California	Inactive	
**Lambda Beta**	February 19, 2000 – 2014; 2020	Florida Atlantic University	Boca Raton, Florida	Active	
**Lambda Gamma**	April 29, 2000	Montclair State University	Montclair, New Jersey	Active	
**Lambda Delta**	April 1, 2000	University of Vermont	Burlington, Vermont	Active	
**Lambda Epsilon**	November 11, 2001	University of Alberta	Edmonton, Alberta, Canada	Active	
Lambda Zeta	November 10, 2001 – March 2024	Drexel University	Philadelphia, Pennsylvania	Inactive	
**Lambda Eta**	November 17, 2001	William Woods University	Fulton, Missouri	Active	
Lambda Theta	December 1, 2001 – 2019	University of Dayton	Dayton, Ohio	Inactive	
**Lambda Iota**	April 13, 2002	University of Central Oklahoma	Edmond, Oklahoma	Active	
**Lambda Kappa**	April 3, 2004	College of Charleston	Charleston, South Carolina	Active	
**Lambda Lambda**	April 17, 2004	University of California, Irvine	Irvine, California	Active	
**Lambda Mu**	April 23, 2005	Embry–Riddle Aeronautical University, Daytona Beach	Daytona Beach, Florida	Active	
**Lambda Nu**	April 8, 2006	Boston University	Boston, Massachusetts	Active	
**Lambda Xi**	April 22, 2006	Florida Gulf Coast University	Fort Myers, Florida	Active	
Lambda Omicron	October 14, 2006 – 2012	Rogers State University	Claremore, Oklahoma	Inactive	
**Lambda Pi**	October 27, 2007	Hofstra University	Nassau County, New York	Active	
**Lambda Rho**	April 4, 2009	University of North Carolina at Greensboro	Greensboro, North Carolina	Active	
Lambda Sigma	December 5, 2009 – 2016	Trinity University	San Antonio, Texas	Inactive	
Lambda Tau	January 30, 2010 – 2014	DePaul University	Chicago, Illinois	Inactive	
**Lambda Upsilon**	February 27, 2010	McNeese State University	Lake Charles, Louisiana	Active	
**Lambda Phi**	April 17, 2010	University of North Carolina Wilmington	Wilmington, North Carolina	Active	
Lambda Chi	April 17, 2010 – 2025	Virginia Commonwealth University	Richmond, Virginia	Inactive	
Lambda Psi	October 30, 2010 – 2022	California State University, Chico	Chico, California	Inactive	
**Lambda Omega**	April 16, 2011	Towson University	Towson, Maryland	Active	
Mu Alpha	May 21, 2011 – June 6, 2023	Rowan University	Glassboro, New Jersey	Inactive	
Mu Beta	March 24, 2012 – 2018	Kennesaw State University	Cobb County, Georgia	Inactive	
**Mu Gamma**	March 16, 2013	Binghamton University	Binghamton, New York	Active	
**Mu Delta**	March 6, 2013	McMaster University	Hamilton, Ontario, Canada	Active	
Mu Epsilon	May 11, 2013 – 2022	California State University, Fullerton	Fullerton, California	Inactive	
Mu Zeta	July 20, 2013 – 2018	Ramapo College	Mahwah, New Jersey	Inactive	
**Mu Eta**	November 16, 2013	Methodist University	Fayetteville, North Carolina	Active	
**Mu Theta**	November 23, 2013	Kent State University	Kent, Ohio	Active	
Mu Iota	May 31, 2014 – 2019	Columbus State University	Columbus, Georgia	Inactive	
**Mu Kappa**	October 25, 2014	Northwestern State University	Natchitoches, Louisiana	Active	
**Mu Lambda**	November 22, 2014	West Chester University	West Chester, Pennsylvania	Active	
**Mu Mu**	April 11, 2015	Jacksonville University	Jacksonville, Florida	Active	
Mu Nu	June 27, 2015 – 2022	Southeastern Louisiana University	Hammond, Louisiana	Inactive	
Mu Xi	September 26, 2016 – 2020	Bridgewater State University	Bridgewater, Massachusetts	Inactive	
**Mu Omicron**	August 20, 2016	South Dakota State University	Brookings, South Dakota	Active	
Mu Pi	October 15, 2016 – 2021	United States Military Academy	West Point, New York	Inactive	
**Mu Rho**	April 30, 2017	Christopher Newport University	Newport News, Virginia	Active	
**Mu Sigma**	October 14, 2017	Arkansas Tech University	Russellville, Arkansas	Active	
**Mu Tau**	April 28, 2018	University of Northern Colorado	Greeley, Colorado	Active	
**Mu Upsilon**	October 31, 2020	Jacksonville State University	Jacksonville, Alabama	Active	
**Mu Phi**	April 17, 2021	Northwest Missouri State University	Maryville, Missouri	Active	
**Mu Chi**	May 8, 2021	California State University, San Bernardino	San Bernardino, California	Active	
**Mu Psi**	October 23, 2021	Boise State University	Boise, Idaho	Active	
**Mu Omega**	April 5, 2025	Pepperdine University	Malibu, California	Active	(Note: Colony formed in 2023.)
**Nu Alpha**		University of North Florida	Jacksonville, Florida	Active	(Note: Colony formed in 2022.)
		North Dakota State University	Fargo, North Dakota	Provisional	(Note: Colony formed in 2024.)
		Ball State University	Muncie, Indiana	Provisional	
