= Horace Locklear =

American politician (1942–2024)

- Locklear c. 1977

Member of the North Carolina House of Representatives from the 21st District
- In office 1977–1982
- Preceded by: Henry Ward Oxendine

Personal details
- Born: November 27, 1942 Lumberton, North Carolina, U.S.
- Died: May 5, 2024 (aged 81) Brunswick County, North Carolina
- Party: Democratic
- Spouse: Barbara Brayboy

Horace Locklear (November 27, 1942 – May 5, 2024) was an American politician and attorney who served in the North Carolina House of Representatives from 1977 until 1983. A member of the Lumbee tribe, he was the first Native American to practice law in North Carolina.

== Early life ==
Horace Locklear was born on November 27, 1942, to Riley and Margaret Locklear in Lumberton, North Carolina, United States. He was a member of the Lumbee tribe. He attended Piney Grove Elementary School and Magnolia High School. After graduating from the latter, he attended Pembroke State College, graduating in 1964. He then attended North Carolina Central University, graduating in 1972 with a Juris Doctor degree.

== Career ==
In 1964 Locklear worked as a job developer for the North Carolina Fund's Manpower Program in Statesville. In 1968 he cofounded the Lumbee Regional Development Association.

On August 28, 1972, Locklear was admitted into the North Carolina State Bar, becoming the first Native American to do so. He opened a law practice in Lumberton in an office across the street from the Robeson County Courthouse. That year he was also appointed to serve as North Carolina's delegate at the 25th annual Governor's Interstate Indian Council in Bismarck, North Dakota. In 1974 he served as the county manager of Nick Galifianakis' U.S. Senate campaign. In 1976 he ran as member of the Democratic Party unopposed for a seat in the North Carolina House of Representatives. He was elected and took office the following year, representing the 21st District, which included portions of Robeson, Hoke, and Scotland counties. In 1979 Locklear gave a speech before the House in favor of designating the eastern box turtle the state reptile of North Carolina, noting its historical importance to indigenous communities. He left office in 1982.

In 1988 Locklear briefly served as a defense attorney for Eddie Hatcher, a man charged with taking hostages at the offices of The Robesonian in February. Hatcher dismissed him before his trial began. In November Locklear was charged in the Robeson County Court with attempted obstruction of justice, obtaining property under false pretenses, and attempted obtaining property under false pretenses. The prosecutor alleged that Locklear had met with a convicted drug trafficker and acquired money from him while asserting that he had close connections with a judge and could convince the judge to lighten his sentence. No charges were brought against the drug trafficker, and Locklear's attorneys accused the prosecutor of engaging in selective prosecution. He eventually reached a plea bargain with the prosecutor, pleading guilty to two charges of obstruction of justice and in turn receiving a suspended sentence of three years and being compelled to perform community service. He was subsequently disbarred by the North Carolina State Bar for unethical conduct.

== Personal life and death ==
On May 11, 1963, Locklear married Barbara Brayboy. He had three children with her.

Locklear died at Lower Cape Fear LifeCare in Brunswick County, on May 5, 2024, at the age of 81.

== Works cited ==
- Brayboy, Connee (1999). Pembroke in the Twentieth Century. Arcadia Publishing. ISBN 9780738590370.
- Cheney, John L. Jr., ed. (1977). North Carolina Manual. Raleigh: North Carolina Secretary of State. OCLC 1245537.
