= Lumbee Regional Development Association =

Nonprofit corporation

The Lumbee Regional Development Association (LRDA) is a nonprofit corporation, chartered by the State of North Carolina in 1968, organized to analyze and develop solutions for the health, educational, economic, and general welfare problems of rural and urban Indians in and around Robeson County. Its effective domain includes, but is not limited to, the Counties of Robeson, Hoke, Scotland, and Bladen, i.e., North Carolina's Planning Region N. Federally funded programs are currently administered by the Lumbee citizens of these neighboring counties, from the LRDA offices in Pembroke, North Carolina. LRDA currently serves over 20,600 people each year. In July 2009, it had 62 full-time employees.

== History ==
The Lumbee Tribe is a state-recognized tribe located in Robeson County and adjoining counties. Since 1956, the Lumbee Tribe has sought out federal recognition through the Lumbee Act. Twelve years later, Lumbee individuals created an organization that would help the Lumbee people in many ways. In the winter of 1967–68, Bruce Jones (Lumbee), Horace Locklear (Lumbee), Rod Locklear (Lumbee), and Gerald Sider worked extensively to establish an Indian poverty program agency, known as the Regional Development Association (RDA). It would help primarily Indians, but African Americans as well. At first, RDA was a shell organization: a charter, a board of directors and little else. In 1970, the organization began to expand inside the channels of the Lumbee people's hopes and claims. The Lumbees saw the need to expand the association that would benefit the tribe socially, culturally, economically, and politically. As it developed, it quickly transformed into Lumbee Regional Development Association (LRDA), with an all-Indian board of directors and a specific Lumbee focus. The Lumbee Regional Development Association (LRDA) is a nonprofit corporation, chartered by the State of North Carolina, organized to analyze and develop solutions for the health, educational, economic, and general welfare problems of rural and urban Indians in and around Robeson. The effective domain of the LRDA includes, but is not limited to, the Counties of Robeson, Hoke, Scotland, and Bladen, i.e., North Carolina's Planning Region N. Federally funded programs are currently administered by the Lumbee citizens of these neighboring counties from the LRDA offices in Pembroke, N.C. Since its establishment, LRDA has founded and supported many projects that are either targeted around Robeson and adjoining counties or specifically, the Indians of Robeson County. Projects include the Head Start Program, Thrifty Food Co-ops, Talent Research Project, Lumbee Homecoming, the funding of the renovation of Old Main at Pembroke State University and Strike at the Wind.

== Great Seal ==
LRDA's seal, known as the Great Seal, exemplifies the courage and tenacity of the Lumbee people.

The current logo features the end of a canoe with the words "no boundaries" located under it. The LRDA uses this image to illustrate its purpose: just as the canoe continues to flow down a river, the LRDA will continue to uphold its mission. This logo is symbolic to the organization, because it displays the message that LRDA will continue to help others in both the present and the future of these designated communities.

== Funding ==
The LRDA was a small struggling organization from 1968 to 1971. In 1971, the LRDA received a grant from the federal government to implement an economic development planning project in Robeson County. LRDA received money from the Office of Economic Opportunity (OEO) and, increasingly, from the Department of Health, Education and Welfare (HEW) and the Department of Labor; surprisingly, most of the money that LRDA received came through Indian "set-aside" budgets. The agency subsequently applied for and received funds to implement programs for community services, educational services, economic development and employment and training services. Currently, LRDA receives federal, state, and private funds for an operating budget of about $3 million. In 2011, it was reported that LRDA had a source revenue of about $3.6 million. This budget included federal grants (Head Start Program and Department of Labor), state grants, service frees, and miscellaneous income from other organizations. The agency has never been charged with abuse or misapplication of funds.

== Projects ==
The majority of the programs of LRDA are intended to improve the education of Indian people. The LRDA also operates community service programs that serve people of all races equally.

The LRDA operates six projects that are mandated by federal laws to serve only Indians. The Jobs Training Partnership Act (JTPA) project provides jobs training for economically disadvantaged Indian people. The Administration for Native Americans project provides support for economic development ventures in Indian communities, support for research efforts to document the history and genealogy of Indians, and support for the administration of LRDA. The Community Services Block Grant project provides social services outreach to needy families, support for senior citizens activities, and assistance with home energy needs and family crises.

Three educational programs of LRDA provide special services to Indian people. The Lumbee Indian Education project provides educational services to children in the local communities. The Lumbee Indian Education project is funded through the Indian Education Act of 1972, with a budget of $196,000 for Fiscal Year 1977–78. The Indian Education Act is to provide better educational opportunities for Indian students through three components: early childhood education, community services, and Native American resource library. The Lumbee Adult Education project provides services to help out-of-school adults obtain a high school education. The Lumbee Adult Education project will provide individual and small group reading instructions, motivational counseling, and supportive services to 75 participants in three communities: New Point, Rex Rennert, and Shoeheel. The Lumbee River Native American Center for the Arts provided special instruction in the performing arts to Indian students in high school.

While the LRDA has established many programs centering on the Lumbee community, they have funded projects that affect the community and all races at large within Robeson County. Projects have included: the Head Start Program, Thrifty Food Co-ops, Talent Research Project, Lumbee Homecoming, the funding of the Old Main at Pembroke State University and Strike at the Wind.

LRDA proposed a plan to create a project that would target a Head Start Program. The purpose of the plan was to ensure and provide enrollment of eligible applicants, regardless of race, sex, creed, color, national origin and/or disability. The plan seeks out children from the most disadvantaged home taking into account the demographic makeup and targeted areas the program will serve. The first LRDA Head Start center established was the Rennert Center, followed by Green Grove, and later Allenton. The Head Start Centers operate Monday-Friday, 8:00 a.m until 2:00 p.m.

The LRDA Head Start Policy Council goals, in accordance with HHS/ACYE regulations, are: initiate suggestions and ideas for program improvements, organize activities, administer Parent Activity Fund, mobilize community resources, communicate with parents, approve Head Start goals, approve locations of the centers, developing a plan for recruitment, approve policies, approve services, address complaints, advise regarding standards for space, approve personnel policies, approve/hire staff, approve funding, approve major changes to budget, approve information required for the pre-view, and conduct self-evaluation of the Head Start Program.

The Lumbee Talent Search project is funded by the U.S. Office of Education. It seeks to counsel economical or culturally deprived rural students in grades 9, 10, 11, and 12 on postsecondary educational opportunities available to them. It assists students in enrolling in institutions of higher education or training and obtaining financial aid to further their education and provide students the resource information and materials relating to higher educational opportunities. Lastly, it provides motivational counseling and guidance for potential high school dropouts and students who have dropped out to educate them on the importance of high schools diplomas and college degrees.

LRDA is a co-sponsor for Lumbee Homecoming. According to a recent program for the event, Lumbee Homecoming serves to "capture the glory, faith, skills, and talents of many Lumbees into one space and time." Lumbee Homecoming is the ultimate vision of the Lumbee experience expressed in pageantry, parade, contests, games, and a firework celebration in the first week of July.

Strike at the Wind, a Robeson County musical outdoor drama ran from the 1970s until 2007. The drama tells the story of the Lowrie War, which is one of the most important events in North Carolina history. It opens in 1865, at the end of the Civil War. In the play, Henry Berry Lowrie, a 17-year-old Lumbee Indian boy, is confronted with the unjustified murder of his father and brother at the hands of the Confederate Home Guard.
