= Pates, North Carolina =

Populated place in North Carolina, U.S.

Coordinates: 34°41′24″N 79°12′54″W

Pates is a community in Robeson County, North Carolina, United States.

== History ==
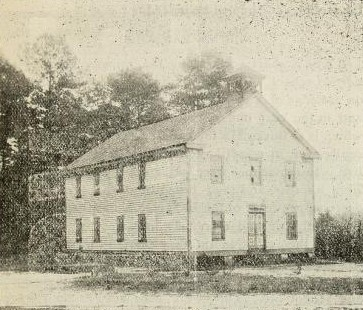
Croatan Normal School in Pates, c. 1909

Pates is located in western Robeson County. According to historian William McKee Evans, it was preceded by a village known as Eureka. The community of Pates was established around 1880 by Russell W. Livermore, who settled on the land of a dead friend. It was named for a railway worker, Ed Pates. The community was incorporated in 1883, though in time its municipal government became inactive. By 1884 the town hosted a railway station and approximately 100 inhabitants. In 1887 the Croatan Normal School was founded, and its first buildings were established in Pates. The institution later moved to Pembroke.
