= Ruth Revels =

American indigenous rights activist

- Born: Annie Ruth Locklear; 1936; Pembroke, North Carolina
- Died: March 14, 2016 (aged 79–80)
- Occupation: Teacher

Ruth Revels (1936 - March 14, 2016) was an American activist and educator who became the founder and executive director of the Guilford Native American Association (GNAA). Revels graduated with an English degree in 1958 from Pembroke State College. She fought to protect and honor the university's heritage. Ruth Revels died on March 14, 2016.

== Early life ==
Ruth Revels grew up in Robeson County, NC in the 1940s and was from the Lumbee tribe. She experienced a unique three-way segregation between white Americans, African Americans, and Indian Americans. Revels grew up in a hardworking household on the outskirts of Pembroke. Her family was a farm family and neither of her parents (Willard Brantley Locklear and Pearlie Mae)had graduated from high school. She married Lonnie Revels, who along with Revels is credited with running Ku Klux Klan members out of Roberson county in 1958.

== Education ==
Revels attended Pembroke State College, now University of North Carolina at Pembroke, where she graduated with an English degree in 1958. During her time there, she won the title of ‘Miss Pembroke State’ in 1956.

== Activism ==
After graduation Revels taught at Ragsdale High in Jamestown for 14 years, leaving the classroom in 1977. She helped create and run the Guilford Native American Association (GNAA), with the goal to empower and educate the Native American community. Through GNAA Revels spoke out against the use of American Indians as high school mascots in the early 2000s. Revels served as a member of North Carolina Commissions of Indian Affairs beginning in 2003. In 2013 the Commissions appointed her chair woman, a position Revels held until her death in 2016.
