= Sally McRorie =

American psychologist and painter

- Spouse: Jerry Lee Hagaman (m. 1978; div. 1992)

Academic background
- Education: BA, art education and painting, 1976, University of North Carolina at Pembroke; MA, Art Education and Printmaking, 1979, East Tennessee State University; PhD, Art Education, 1985, University of Kansas
- Thesis: Responses of preschool teachers to the products of preschool children's art and play activities (1985)

Academic work
- Institutions: Florida State University; Florida Institute for Art Education; Purdue University

Sally Elaine McRorie is an American psychologist and painter. She is the provost and executive vice president for academic affairs at Florida State University and president of the National Association of Schools of Art and Design.

== Early life and education ==
McRorie was raised in North Carolina and spent her summers on the beaches of Emerald Isle, North Carolina. She attended JH Rose High School where she received a Gold Key as a top-rated artist at the Sholastic Art Awards. Upon graduating from high school, she enrolled at the University of North Carolina at Pembroke and graduated in 1976. Following her undergraduate degree, McRorie spent one year teaching elementary school before being accepted into East Tennessee State University's Art Master's degree program. McRorie completed her education upon earning her PhD at the University of Kansas in 1985.

== Career ==
Upon graduating from the University of Kansas, McRorie found work as an art educator at Purdue University's Department of Creative Arts. In 1988, after two years at the institution, she was the recipient of two honors from the Art Education Association of Indiana: Indiana Higher Education Art Educator of the Year and Indiana Art Educator of the Year. As an assistant professor in the department, McRorie received the Mary J. Rouse Award from the National Art Education Association as "a young art educator who has demonstrated excellence in teaching, scholarship and leadership."

McRorie eventually left Purdue in 1994 to become the Co-director of Florida Institute for Art Education and Chair and Professor of Art Education at Florida State University (FSU). While serving as chairwoman of Florida State University's art education department, she was promoted to dean of FSU's School of Visual Arts and Dance in 2002. In this role, she oversaw the establishment of the College of Visual Arts, Theatre and Dance, with the inclusion of the School of Theatre and the John and Mable Ringling Museum of Art. From 2004 until 2012, McRorie was appointed Dean of the College of Fine Arts where she oversaw the college's 100 faculty member and 250 staff. In her final year as Dean, she was named vice president for Faculty Development and Advancement by Florida State University Provost and Executive Vice President for Academic Affairs Garnett S. Stokes. As vice president, McRorie was expected to oversee faculty development activities, the promotion and tenure process, and all curricular matters in consultation with the Faculty Senate.

Following the departure of Eric J. Barron, McRorie was named interim provost through the conclusion of the presidential search process. She was eventually selected as the university's provost and executive vice president for academic affairs following a national search. During the COVID-19 pandemic, McRorie was selected to leadership positions of two academic boards: president of the National Association of Schools of Art and Design and as chair of the Faculty Advisory Board for the University Press of Florida.

== Personal life ==
McRorie married Jerry Lee Hagaman in 1978 and the two divorced in 1992.
