= Old Main (University of North Carolina at Pembroke) =

Historic university building in North Carolina, US

- Old Main, UNC Pembroke
- U.S. National Register of Historic Places
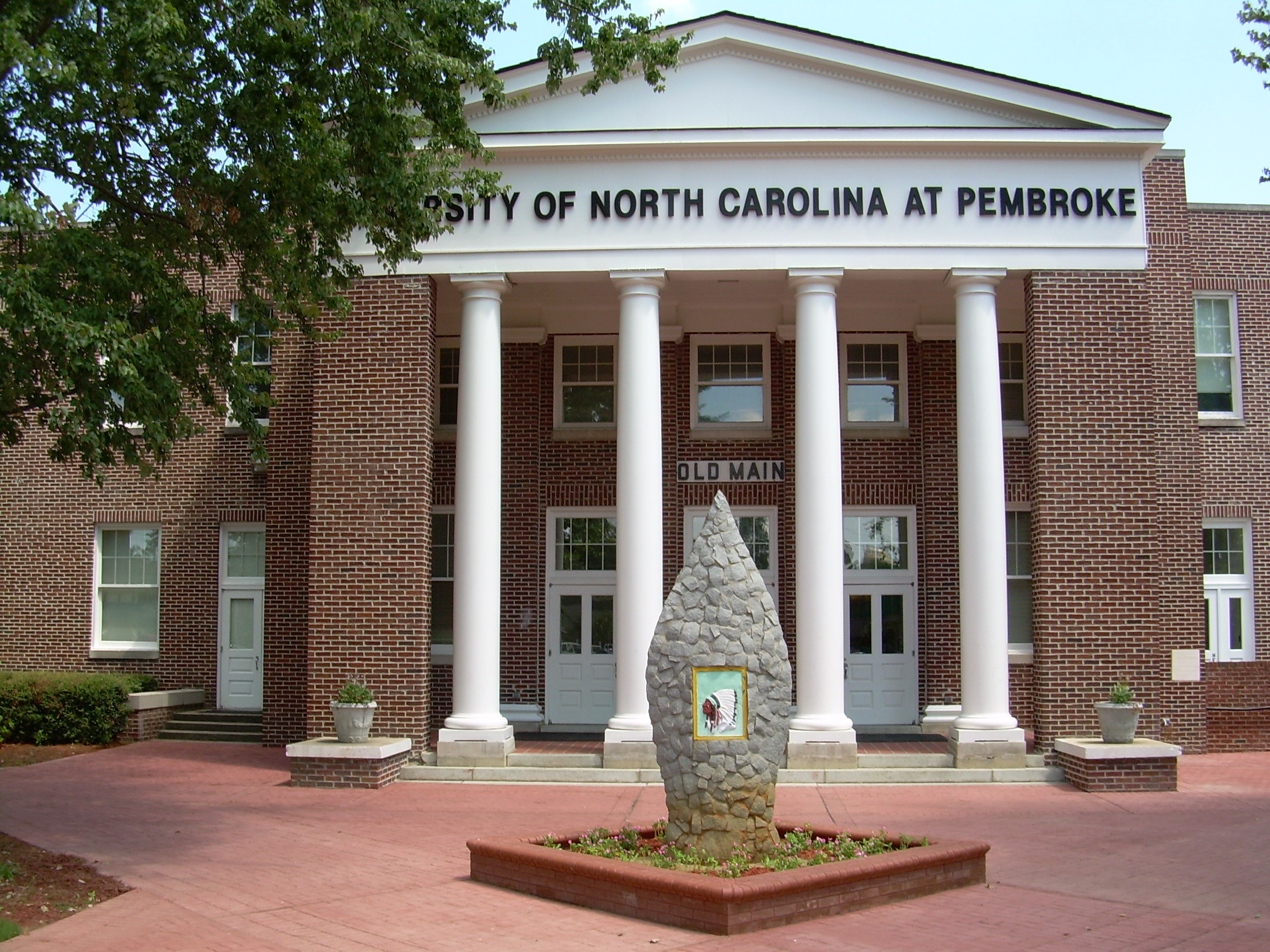
- Old Main in 2007

- Location within North Carolina Location within the United States
- Location: W of jct. of NC 711 and SR 1340, Pembroke, North Carolina
- Coordinates: 34°41′6″N 79°12′7″W
- Area: 5 acres (2.0 ha)
- Built: 1923
- NRHP reference No.: 76001335
- Added to NRHP: May 13, 1976

The Old Main is a historic building on the campus of the University of North Carolina at Pembroke in Pembroke, North Carolina. Completed in 1923, it was the first brick building on the university's campus, then known as the Cherokee Indian Normal School of Robeson County. The building originally hosted classrooms, auditorium space, and administrative offices. After administrative officials moved to a new building in 1949, the structure acquired the "Old Main" name. Since it was used for other community events, it gained additional importance to the primarily Native American student body at the school. Old Main was slated for destruction in 1972, but this decision was overturned after protests by community members. A fire, likely the result of arson, gutted the building in 1973. It was listed on the National Register of Historic Places in 1976 and fully restored and reopened in 1979. It presently hosts several university departments and student media outlets.

== History ==
=== Construction ===
In 1921 the North Carolina General Assembly appropriated $75,000 for the construction of a new building on the campus of the Croatan Indian Normal School of Robeson County, North Carolina, which had existed since 1887. It was completed in 1923, being the first campus building of brick construction. The building hosted twelve classrooms, an auditorium that could seat several hundred people, two offices, four toilets, and a picture booth. It was used over subsequent decades for school events as well as private functions including musical performances and funerals of community leaders. School administrative officials worked there until 1949, when they moved to the newly-constructed Sampson Hall. Clifton Oxendine, a professor, stated he coined the term "Old Main" after the move, in homage to a building with the same name at his alma mater, McKendree College. Newspapers began referring to the building as "Old Main" around 1952. The school itself, founded to train Native American teachers in Robeson County, many of them Lumbees, underwent several name changes in the following years: Pembroke State College for Indians in 1941, Pembroke State College in 1949, and Pembroke State University in 1971. The school was grouped under the University of North Carolina system in July 1972.

=== Save Old Main Committee and burning ===
By the 1970s, Old Main was the oldest standing structure on the university campus, and had become dilapidated, suffering from a leaking roof and a termite infestation. College officials believed that renovating it would cost $500,000. In 1972, with the support of college chancellor English Jones, the board of trustees voted to demolish the building. In its place, the school was to build a new auditorium at the cost of $1.6 million. Some Lumbees, including various alumni, supported the decision, believing the building was no longer of use. Others felt the building represented Lumbee heritage and social progress, and formed the Save Old Main Committee, led by Janie Maynor Locklear, a staffer at the Lumbee Regional Development Association. A petition was circulated to preserve the structure and gained 7,000 signatures. Jones said he feared that saving the building would prevent the construction of the new auditorium. In June, Republican gubernatorial candidate James Holshouser visited Pembroke and offered his support to the renovation of the original building. The following month, the board of trustees announced that they would build the new auditorium elsewhere.

Beginning in February 1973, 40 barns and abandoned homes were burned in Robeson County, most of them owned by white people. At 5:40 AM on March 18, 1973, a security guard reported a fire at Old Main. The local fire department responded and suppressed the blaze. The Robeson County Sheriff's Department investigated the building and observed that a latch had been forced off of a rear door and fires had been set in at least seven places. The Pembroke fire chief also reported that the floors had been coated with oil. Later in the morning, the fire rekindled. The fire department returned and attempted to quench the blaze, but by mid-afternoon the entire building had been gutted. That evening, Governor Holshouser arrived on the Pembroke campus. Standing with Locklear in front of the smoldering ruins, he addressed an indigenous crowd, offering a $5,000 reward for whoever could identify the arsonist responsible for the fire. Approximately 150 members of the Tuscarora movement guarded the ruins, while that night Native Americans harassed white motorists driving near the building and torched a commercial building in town. The Old Main arsonist was never identified.

=== Restoration ===
Four months after the fire, Holshouser appointed the Old Main Commission, which secured funds to restore the ruins. In 1976, Old Main was listed on the National Register of Historic Places. It fully reopened in 1979. The building currently hosts the Museum of the Southeast American Indian; the university's departments of American Indian Studies and Mass Communication; Southeast American Indian Studies; the Curt and Catherine Locklear American Indian Heritage Center; the television station WNCP-TV; and the student newspaper, The Pine Needle.

== Works cited ==
- Dial, Adolph L.; Eliades, David K. (1996). The Only Land I Know: A History of the Lumbee Indians (1st Syracuse University Press ed.). Syracuse: Syracuse University Press. ISBN 9780815603603.
- Lowery, Malinda Maynor (2018). The Lumbee Indians: An American Struggle. Chapel Hill: UNC Press Books. ISBN 978-1-4696-4638-1.
- Sider, Gerald M. (2003). Living Indian Histories: Lumbee and Tuscarora People in North Carolina (revised ed.). Chapel Hill: UNC Press Books. ISBN 9780807855065.
