= Former Pembroke High School =

Historic school building in North Carolina, United States

- U.S. National Register of Historic Places
- Location within North Carolina Location within the United States
- Location: E of the jct. of Hwy. 711 and NC 1561, Pembroke, North Carolina
- Coordinates: 34°41′10″N 79°12′16″W
- Area: less than one acre
- Built: 1939
- Architect: WPA
- NRHP reference No.: 95001071
- Added to NRHP: September 1, 1995

The former Pembroke High School, also known as the Indian Education Resource Center, is a historic high school building located at Pembroke, Robeson County, North Carolina. It was designed and built by the Public Works Administration in 1939. It is a one-story brick building consisting of a central entrance pavilion and auditorium, with flanking classroom wings. The building was renovated in late 1992. The building originally housed a high school for Native American students of the Lumbee tribe.

It was added to the National Register of Historic Places in 1995.
