= University of North Carolina at Pembroke =

Public university in Pembroke, North Carolina, US

Coordinates: 34.68760°N 79.20200°W

University of North Carolina Pembroke
- Former names: Croatan Normal School (1887–1911); Indian Normal School of Robeson County (1911–1913); Cherokee Indian Normal School of Robeson County (1913–1941); Pembroke State College for Indians (1941–1949); Pembroke State College (1949–1969); Pembroke State University (1969–1996)
- Type: Public university
- Established: March 7, 1887; 139 years ago
- Parent institution: University of North Carolina
- Accreditation: SACS
- Endowment: $39.5 million (2025)
- Chancellor: Robin Gary Cummings
- Faculty: 425+
- Students: 7,667
- Undergraduates: 5,644
- Postgraduates: 2,023
- Location: Pembroke, North Carolina, United States
- Campus: 281 acres (1.1 km^{2}); Distant town
- Newspaper: The Pine Needle
- Colors: Black and gold
- Nickname: Braves
- Sporting affiliations: NCAA Division II – Carolinas; MEC
- Mascot: BraveHawk the Red-Tailed Hawk
- Website: www.uncp.edu

The University of North Carolina Pembroke (UNC Pembroke or UNCP) is a public university in Pembroke, North Carolina, United States. UNCP is a public university offering undergraduate, graduate and doctoral degrees and is a constituent institution of the University of North Carolina system. Its history is intertwined with that of the Lumbee nation.

The university's athletics teams, the Braves, compete in NCAA Division II athletics as members of Conference Carolinas.

== History ==
The educational institution that developed into UNC Pembroke originates in the circumstances of the post-Civil War South. This school was a part of the effort of the Lumbee Nation in North Carolina to preserve their unique identity. Access and authority over their educational system were essential to retaining Lumbee culture, instilling a sense of pride, and improving the group's economic and social conditions.

"Croatan Normal School" was created by the General Assembly on March 7, 1887, in response to a local petition sponsored by North Carolina Representative Hamilton McMillan of Robeson County. This event occurred in the context of competition for support between the Democratic and Republican parties in North Carolina. Hamilton MacMillan's support for the school was connected to his interest and research on Native American history and culture. The school's initial name, Croatan Normal School, was selected following the debatable view that this tribe included descendants of the Outer Banks Lost Colony of Sir Walter Raleigh.

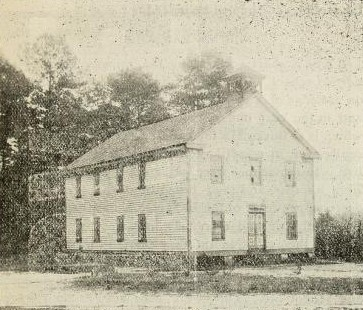
Croatan Normal School in Pates c. 1909

The normal school opened in the spring of 1888 with one teacher and 15 students to train American Indian public school teachers. Initially, enrollment was limited to the American Indians of Robeson County. In this period, school enrollment was often quite limited among the general population. Funding by the state was patchy at best, and there was a high level of illiteracy. Forming a centralized training school for teachers was thought to be the best method of addressing this problem in the given circumstances.

In 1909, the school moved to its present location, about a mile east of the original site. The name was changed in 1911 to the "Indian Normal School of Robeson County", and again in 1913 to the "Cherokee Indian Normal School of Robeson County", tracking the legislature's designation for the Indians of the county, who at one time claimed Cherokee descent. In 1926, the school became a two-year post-secondary normal school; until then, it had provided only primary and secondary instruction.

In 1939, it became a four-year institution; in 1941, it was renamed "Pembroke State College for Indians". The following year, the school began to offer bachelor's degrees in disciplines other than teaching. In 1945, the college was opened to members of all federally recognized tribes. A change of name to "Pembroke State College" in 1949 presaged the admission of white students, which was approved in 1953 for up to forty percent of total enrollment. The Brown v. Board of Education ruling the following year by the United States Supreme Court ended race restrictions at the college. Between 1939 and 1953, Pembroke State was the only state-supported four-year college for Native Americans in the United States.

In 1969, the college became "Pembroke State University", a regional university incorporated into the University of North Carolina system in 1972. The first master's degree program was implemented in 1978. On July 1, 1996, Pembroke State University became "The University of North Carolina at Pembroke".

== Campus ==
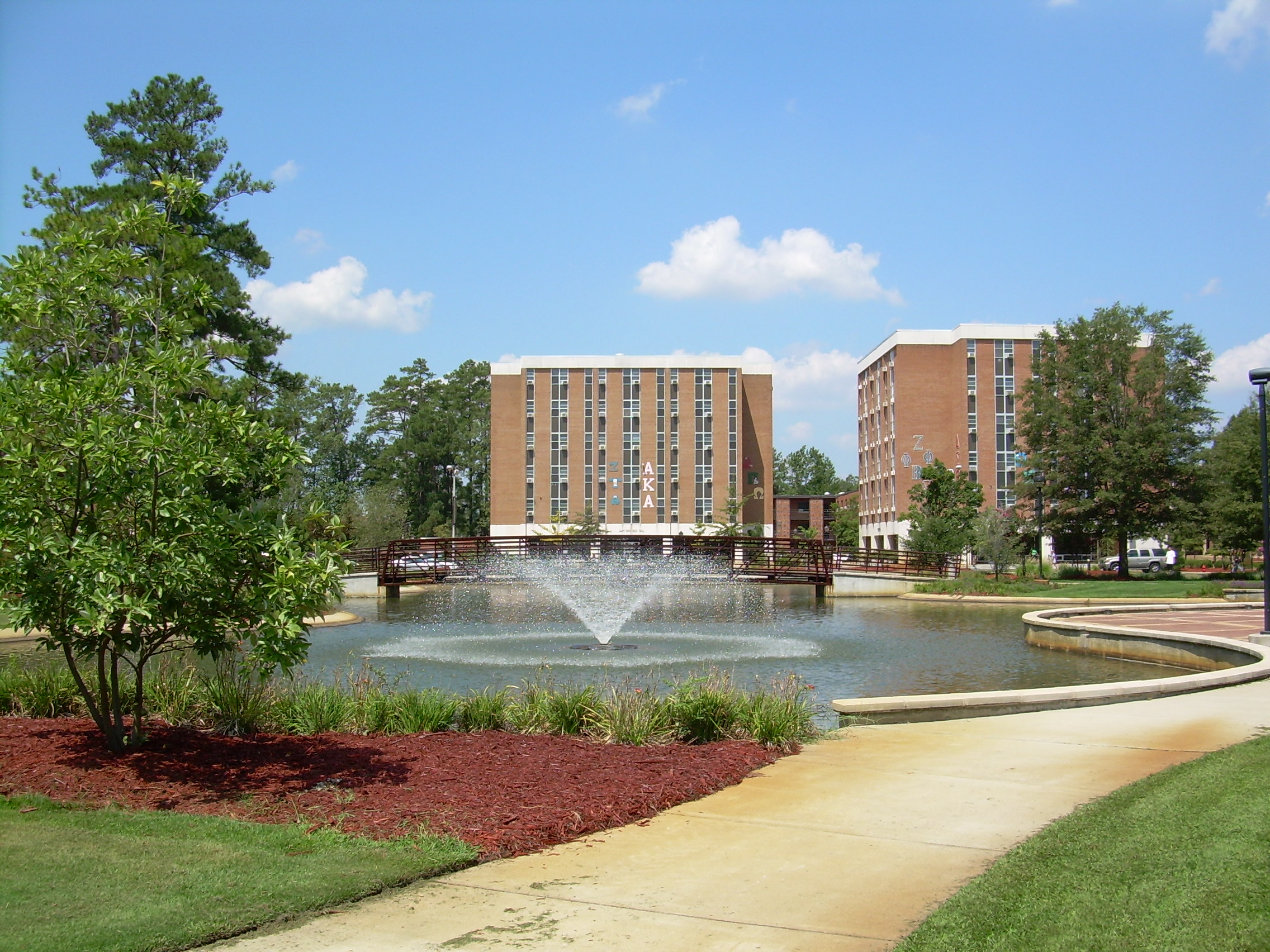
The water feature at UNCP. Belk Hall and North Hall are in the background

The university's campus is located just north of Pembroke, directly behind N.C. Highway 711. Interstate 74 runs minutes from campus, as is Interstate 95. The center of campus is considered to be the Chavis Student Center (often referred to as the University Center, or the UC). Students can bowl, play pool and related games as well as socialize in the lounge. The dining hall and a fast-food outlet are located in the UC.

The Chavis Center lawn is where students play amateur sports, read on benches, or use the area for free speech. The eastern side of campus includes the Livermore Library, Oxendine Science Building, Old Main, and Wellons Hall, among other buildings. The campus on the west side has the Oxendine Administrative Building, The College of Education, and the residence hall communities such as Oak Hall, Pine Hall, North, and Belk. Lumbee Hall, James A. Thomas Hall, the Dial Humanities building, the Sampson building, the Auxiliary building, the Jones Athletic Center, and the Givens Performing Arts Center make up most of the north end of campus.

The campus is home to Givens Performing Arts Center, a regional center for culture, arts, and entertainment. GPAC hosts numerous Broadway shows, orchestras, shows geared towards children, and also hosts the "Distinguished Speaker Series," iwhich has brought in notable people such as Cory Booker, Bill Nye, Jodi Sweetin, Patch Adams, Gabby Douglas and Hill Harper, among many others.

=== The Museum of the Southeast American Indian ===
Located in Old Main at the UNC Pembroke campus is the Museum of the Southeast American Indian. Indigenous artifacts are permanently displayed, and Southeast American Indian Native cultures are honored through arts, traditions and storytelling programs and events.

== Organization ==
UNC Pembroke is one of 17 constituent institutions of the University of North Carolina System. The system is governed by the UNC Board of Governors, whose members are elected by the North Carolina General Assembly. The president of the UNC System is Peter Hans.

The Board of Trustees of UNC Pembroke has 13 members including the student body president, members elected by the UNC System Board of Governors, and appointments made by the governor. The current chancellor of UNC Pembroke is Robin Gary Cummings, who has held the position since 2015.

=== Leaders ===
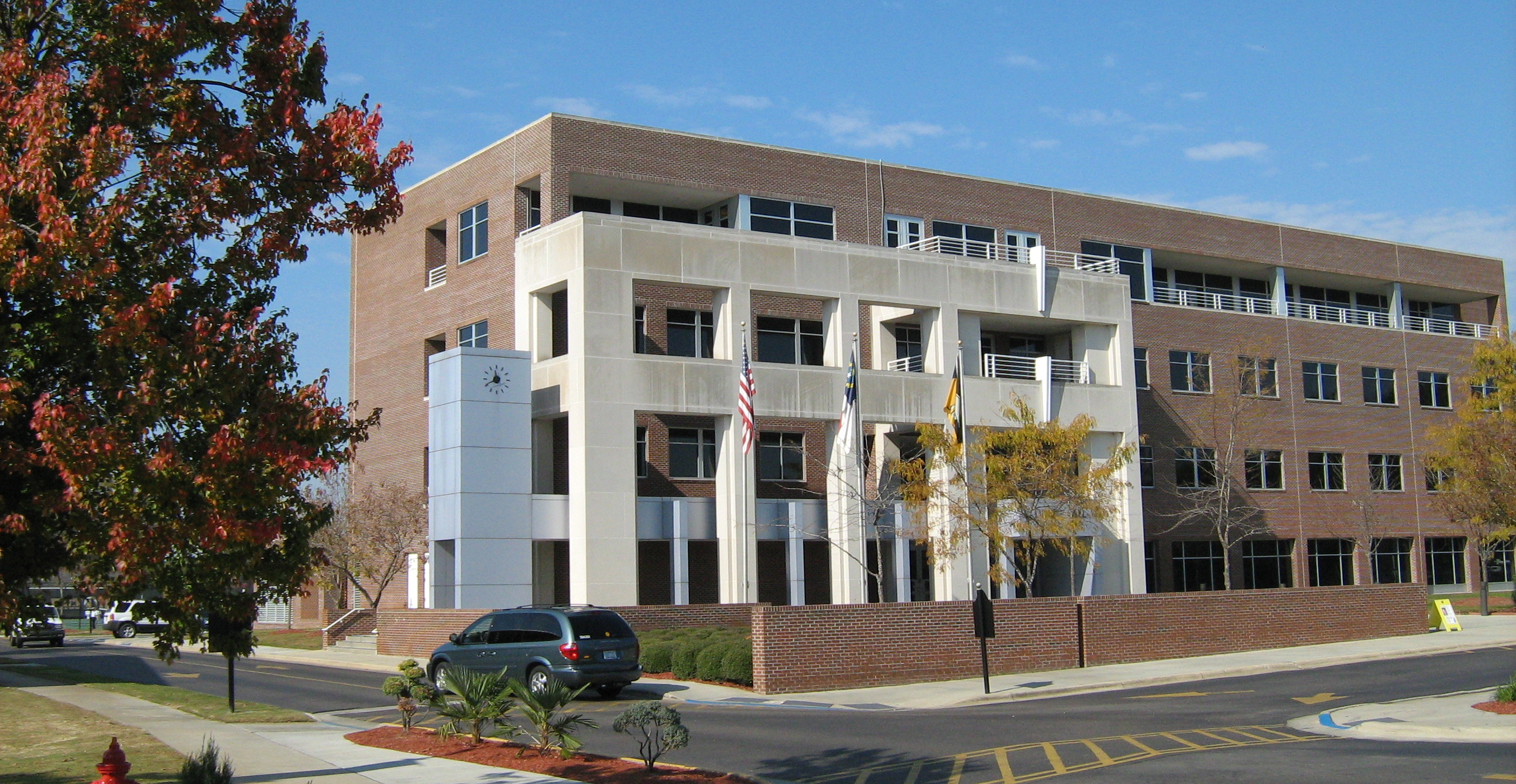
Lumbee Hall, the main administration building

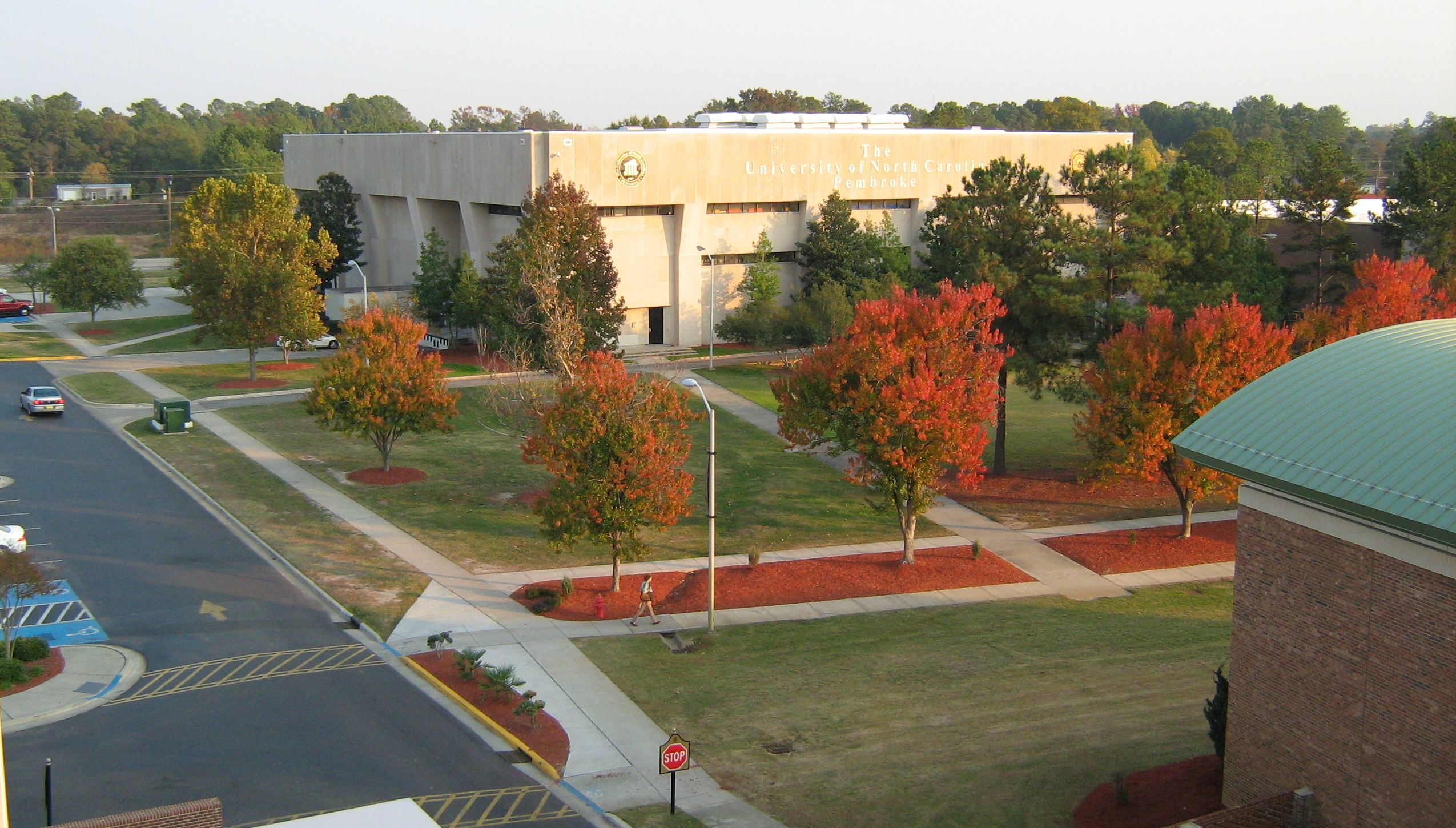
Givens Performing Arts Center

The title of Principal or Superintendent was used for the institution's leader prior to 1940. After 1940, when UNC Pembroke became a collegiate-level institution, the title of "president" was used. Upon becoming a member of the University of North Carolina system, the title was changed to "chancellor".

Presidents

- O. H. Browne (1940–1942)
- Ralph D. Wellons (1942–1956)
- Walter J. Gale (1956–1962)
- English E. Jones (1962–1972)

Chancellors

- English E. Jones (1972–1979)
- Paul R. Givens (1979–1989)
- Joseph B. Oxendine (1989–1999)
- Allen C. Meadors (1999–2009)
- Charles R. Jenkins (2009–2010)
- Kyle R. Carter (2010–2015)
- Robin Gary Cummings (2015–present)

== Academics ==
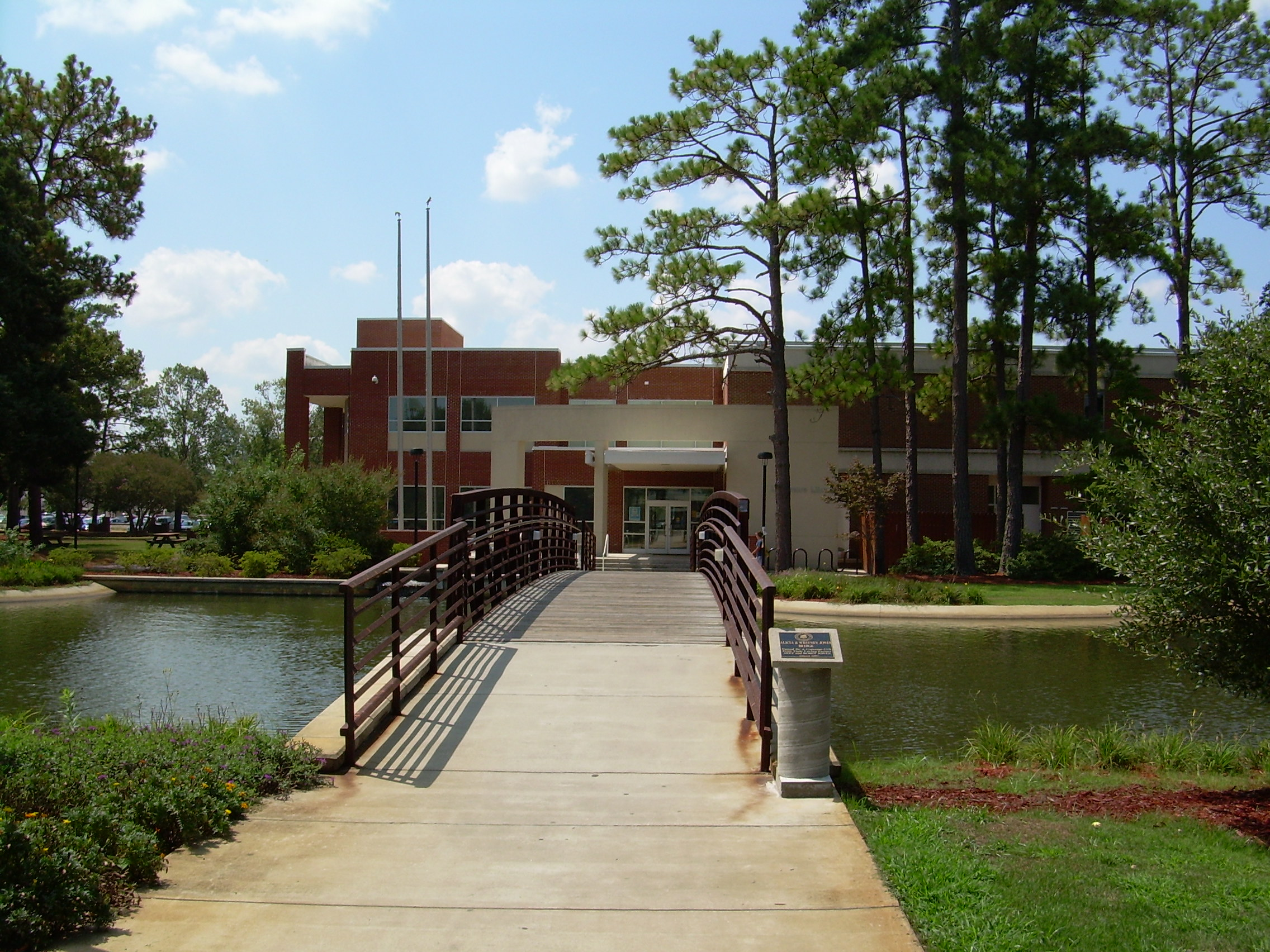
The Alicia and Whitney Jones bridge leading to the Mary Livermore Library

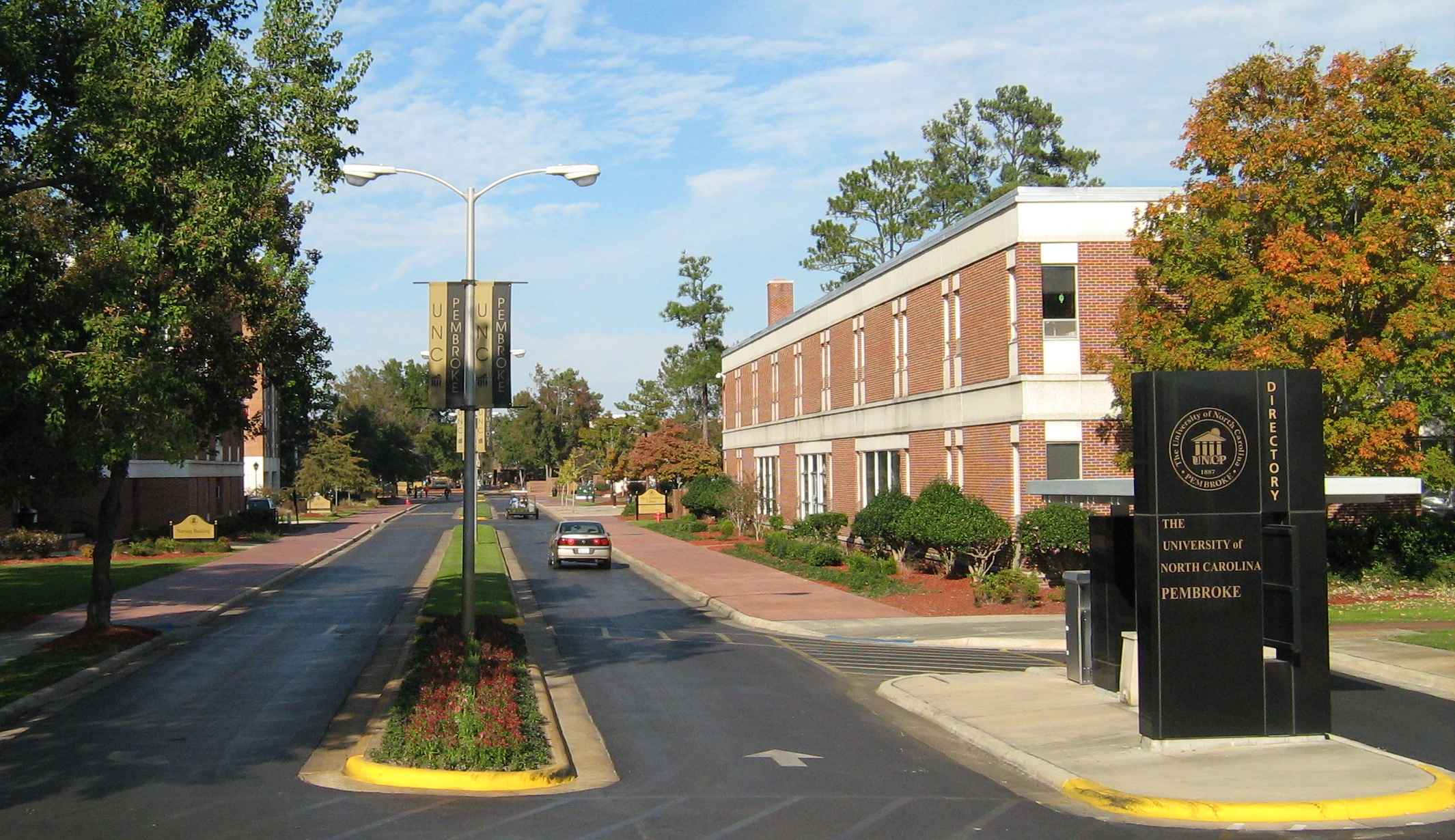
Faculty Row - Library on the right

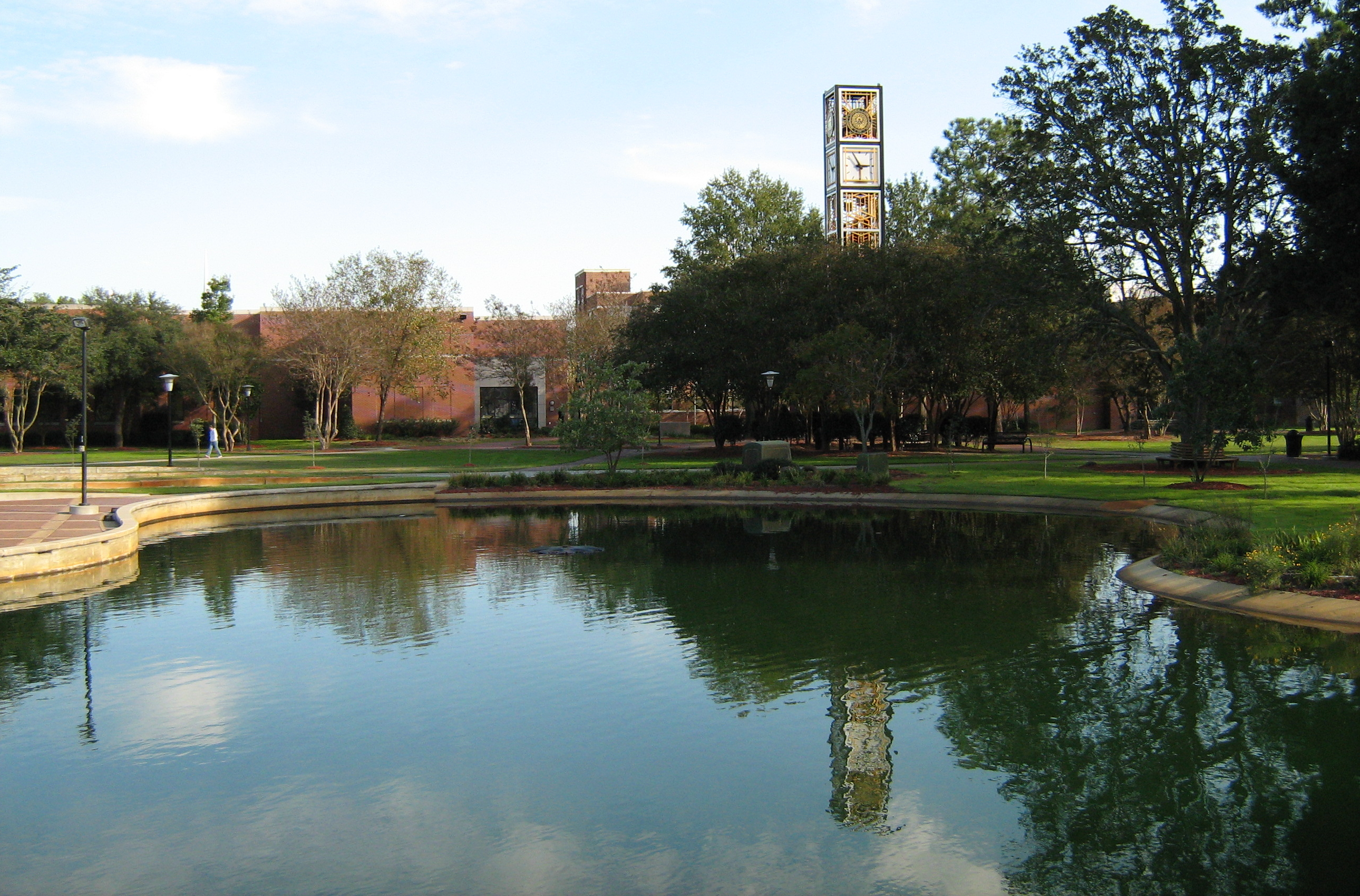
Lowry Bell Tower from the Water Feature

UNCP offers more than 150 undergraduate, graduate and doctoral pathways delivered in on-campus, online, and hybrid formats. The university is organized into the:

- College of Arts & Sciences
- College of Optometric Medicine
- College of Education
- Thomas College of Business & Economics
- Esther G. Maynor Honors College
- William Howard Dean Graduate Schooll

=== Rankings ===
Academic rankings

Master's
- Washington Monthly: 190

Regional
- U.S. News & World Report: 65

The 2025 edition of U.S. News & World Report ranks the university #33 in Regional Universities South and #15 in Top Public Schools. It was also ranked #16 in Best Colleges for Veterans and #10 in Best Undergraduate Teaching.

== Students and faculty ==
UNCP offers small class sizes; the student-to-faculty ratio is 14:1, and classes average 20 students. In addition, classes are taught exclusively by professors, instructors, or other faculty; there are no classes on campus taught by graduate assistants. The school has an enrollment of 8,319 students including 6,318 undergraduate and 2,001 graduate students. The fall 2021 enrollment was the fourth consecutive year of record enrollment growth.

== Student life ==
Undergraduate demographics as of fall 2023
| Race and ethnicity | Total |
|---|---|
| White | 35% |
| Black | 27% |
| American Indian/Alaska Native | 14% |
| Hispanic | 11% |
| Two or more races | 7% |
| International student | 3% |
| Asian | 1% |
| Unknown | 1% |
Economic diversity
| Low-income (Note: The percentage of students who received an income-based federal Pell grant intended for low-income students.) | 49% |
| Affluent (Note: The percentage of students who are a part of the American middle class at the bare minimum.) | 51% |

=== Athletics ===
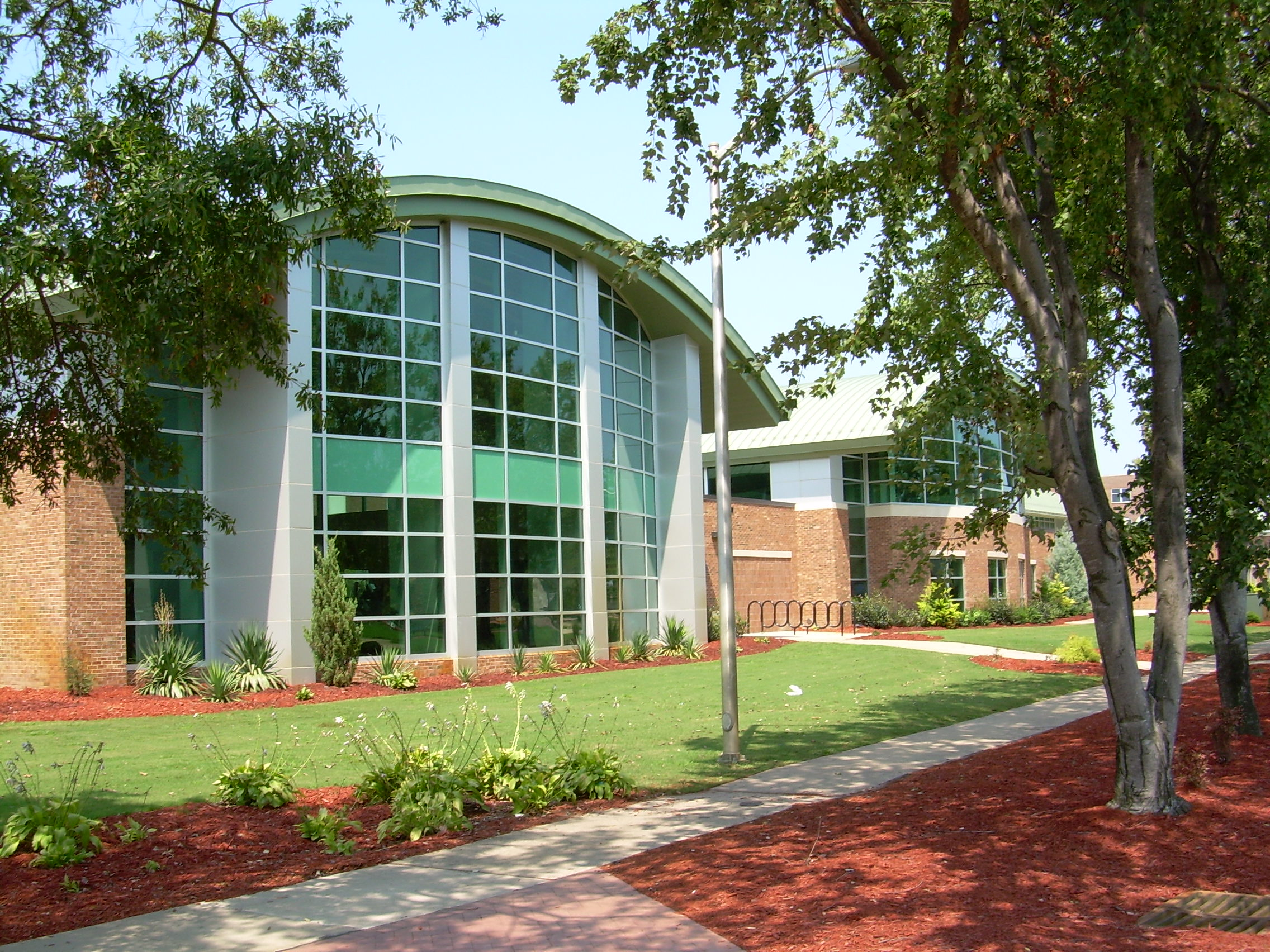
English E. Jones Athletic Center

UNC Pembroke's athletic teams are known as the Braves. Due to its heritage as an institution founded by American Indians for the education of American Indians and the continued support from the Lumbee tribe, the school has largely been immune to the ongoing controversies related to American Indian-themed nicknames and mascots.

The school is a member of the NCAA's Division II and competes in Conference Carolinas and the Mountain East Conference. The school fields varsity sports teams for women and men.

=== Greek life and student organizations ===
UNCP, as well as the Office of Greek Life and the Campus Engagement & Leadership office, offers a variety of extracurricular activities for students. From academic-based and service organizations to minority organizations and Greek life, UNCP offers more than 120 student organizations.

=== Media ===
While the Netflix show The Chair is situated in a Pembroke University, it is a fictional Ivy League University and not the University of North Carolina Pembroke.

== Notable alumni ==
- Brad Allen, NFL official
- Derek Brunson, three-time NCAA Division II All-American wrestler at UNCP; UFC fighter
- Ben Callahan, MLB pitcher
- Domenique Davis, NFL defensive tackle
- Sascha Görres, German footballer who currently plays for Richmond Kickers in the USL Professional Division
- Charles Graham, member of the North Carolina House of Representatives
- Jerry P. Lanier, former U.S. Ambassador to Sudan and a career diplomat with the U.S. Department of State
- Jarrod Lowery, member of the North Carolina House of Representatives
- Sally McRorie, educator, psychologist and painter
- Pardon Ndhlovu, marathon runner from Zimbabwe, competed at the 2016 Summer Olympics
- Julian Pierce, civil rights activist
- Freda Porter, applied mathematician and environmental scientist known as one of the first Native American women to earn a PhD in the mathematical sciences
- Ruth Revels, American Indian activist and educator
- River Ryan, MLB pitcher
- Kelvin Sampson, head basketball coach for the Houston Cougars, former NBA assistant coach for the Milwaukee Bucks, former Washington State, University of Oklahoma, and Indiana University head coach
