= Pembroke, North Carolina =

- Town
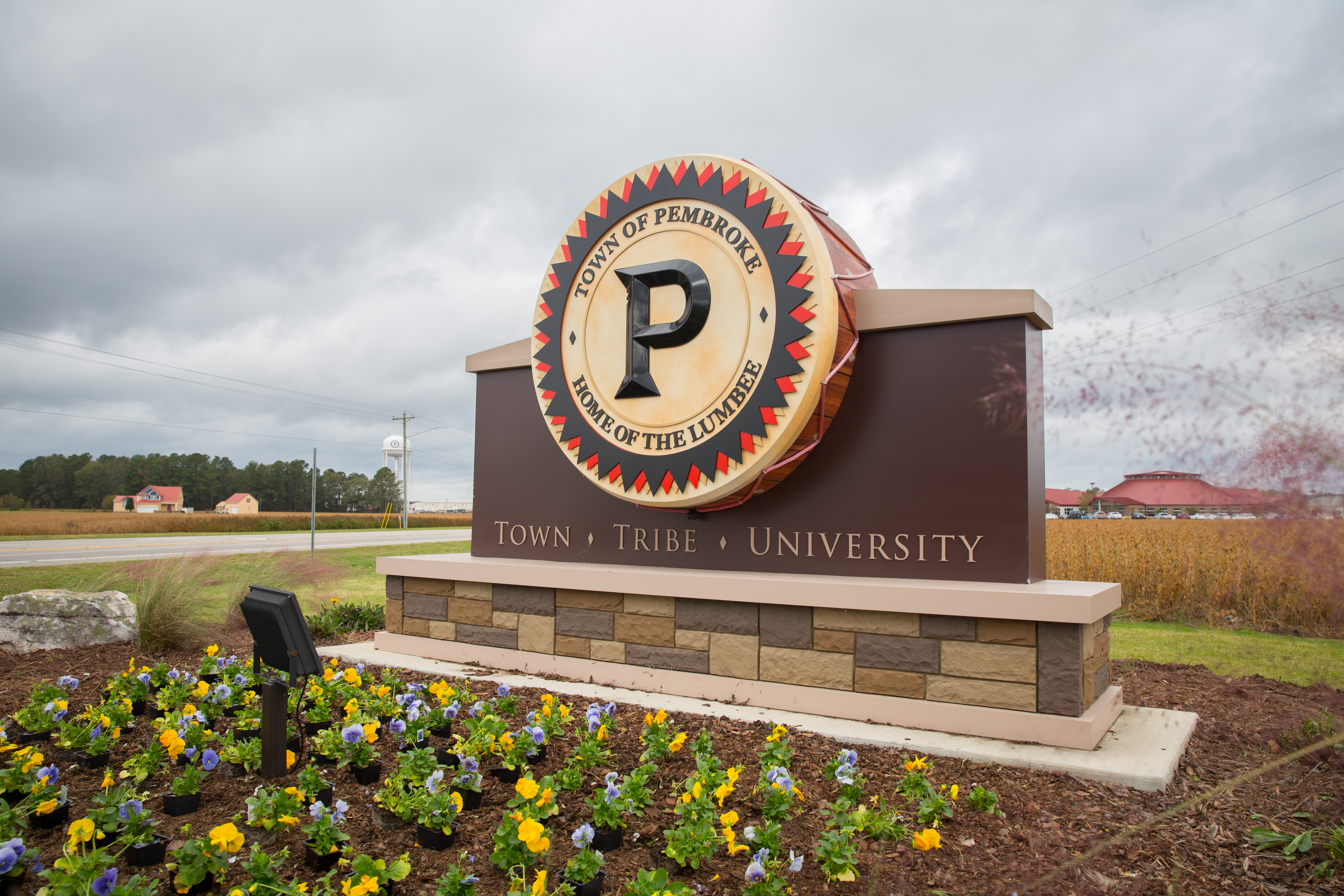
- Town of Pembroke welcome sign. "Town. Tribe. University."

- Seal
- Nickname: Home of the Tribe
- Location within the state of North Carolina Pembroke, North Carolina (the United States)
- Coordinates: 34°40′36″N 79°11′36″W
- Country: United States
- State: North Carolina
- County: Robeson
- Incorporated: 1895
- Named after: Pembroke Jones

Government
  - Mayor: Allen G. Dial

Area
  - Total: 3.18 sq mi (8.23 km^{2})
  - Land: 3.18 sq mi (8.23 km^{2})
  - Water: 0 sq mi (0.00 km^{2})
- Elevation: 171 ft (52 m)

Population (2020)
  - Total: 2,823
  - Density: 888.1/sq mi (342.88/km^{2})
- Time zone: UTC-5 (Eastern (EST))
  - Summer (DST): UTC-4 (EDT)
- ZIP code: 28372
- Area codes: 910, 472
- FIPS code: 37-51080
- GNIS feature ID: 2407093
- Website: www.pembrokenc.com

Pembroke is a town in Robeson County, North Carolina, United States. It is about 90 miles inland and northwest from the Atlantic Coast. The population was 2,823 at the 2020 census. The town is the seat of the federally recognized Lumbee Tribe of North Carolina, as well as the home of the University of North Carolina at Pembroke.

== Geography ==
According to the United States Census Bureau, the town has a total area of 2.3 square miles (6.0 km^{2}), all land.

== Demographics ==
Historical population
Census	Pop.	Note	%±
1910	258		—
1920	829		221.3%
1930	524		−36.8%
1940	783		49.4%
1950	1,212		54.8%
1960	1,372		13.2%
1970	1,982		44.5%
1980	2,698		36.1%
1990	2,241		−16.9%
2000	2,399		7.1%
2010	2,973		23.9%
2020	2,823		−5.0%
U.S. Decennial Census

=== Racial and ethnic composition ===
Pembroke town, North Carolina – Racial composition Note: the US Census treats Hispanic/Latino as an ethnic category. This table excludes Latinos from the racial categories and assigns them to a separate category. Hispanics/Latinos may be of any race.
Race (NH = Non-Hispanic)	2020	2010	2000	1990	1980
White alone (NH)	13.4% (377)	15.8% (471)	9.4% (226)	11.6% (260)	25.7% (694)
Black alone (NH)	11.1% (313)	12.2% (363)	5.3% (126)	3.3% (73)	7.2% (194)
American Indian alone (NH)	64.8% (1,830)	65.7% (1,954)	81.6% (1,958)	83.7% (1,876)	65.4% (1,764)
Asian alone (NH)	0.6% (16)	0.6% (17)	0.5% (13)	0.1% (3)	0.6% (17)
Pacific Islander alone (NH)	0% (1)	0.2% (6)	0% (0)		
Other race alone (NH)	0.6% (17)	0.2% (5)	0.3% (8)	0% (0)	0% (0)
Multiracial (NH)	5.7% (160)	3.1% (92)	1.8% (42)	—	—
Hispanic/Latino (any race)	3.9% (109)	2.2% (65)	1.1% (26)	1.3% (29)	1.1% (29)

=== 2020 census ===
As of the 2020 census, Pembroke had a population of 2,823. The median age was 28.1 years. 26.0% of residents were under the age of 18 and 13.6% of residents were 65 years of age or older. For every 100 females there were 77.2 males, and for every 100 females age 18 and over there were 69.1 males age 18 and over.

93.4% of residents lived in urban areas, while 6.6% lived in rural areas.

There were 1,174 households in Pembroke, of which 32.8% had children under the age of 18 living in them. Of all households, 16.6% were married-couple households, 23.4% were households with a male householder and no spouse or partner present, and 53.4% were households with a female householder and no spouse or partner present. About 37.9% of all households were made up of individuals and 12.2% had someone living alone who was 65 years of age or older.

There were 1,263 housing units, of which 7.0% were vacant. The homeowner vacancy rate was 0.3% and the rental vacancy rate was 4.1%.

The most reported detailed racial/ethnic groups in 2020 were:

- Lumbee Tribe of North Carolina (52.6%)
- African American (10.4%)
- Irish (4%)
- English (3.9%)
- German (2.6%)
- Mexican (2.1%)

=== 2010 census ===
According to the 2010 US Census, the population was 2,937. Of this, 1,975 (66.43%) were American Indian or Alaska Native, 489 (16.45%) were White, 367 (12.34%) were Black or African American, 101 (3.40%) were two or more races, 18 (0.61%) were some other race, 17 (0.57%) were Asian, 6 (0.20%) were Native Hawaiian or other Pacific Islander. 65 (2.19%) were Hispanic or Latino of any race.

=== 2000 census ===
Largest ancestries (2000)	Percent
Lumbee	67%
African American	5%
Unspecified Native American	4%
Irish	2%
English	2%
Scottish	2%
French	1%

According to the 2000 census, there were 2,399 people, 961 households, and 611 families residing in the town. The population density was 1,023.9 inhabitants per square mile (395.3/km^{2}). There were 1,043 housing units at an average density of 445.1 per square mile (171.9/km^{2}).

There were 961 households, out of which 35.7% had children under the age of 18 living with them, 27.3% were married couples living together, 32.5% had a female householder with no husband present, and 36.4% were non-families. 32.5% of all households were made up of individuals, and 11.2% had someone living alone who was 65 years of age or older. The average household size was 2.46 and the average family size was 3.12.

In the town, the population was spread out, with 34.8% under the age of 18, 11.5% from 18 to 24, 25.8% from 25 to 44, 17.6% from 45 to 64, and 10.3% who were 65 years of age or older. The median age was 27 years. For every 100 females, there were 75.2 males. For every 100 females age 18 and over, there were 64.9 males.

The median income for a household in the town was $18,355, and the median income for a family was $21,218. Males had a median income of $26,875 versus $21,510 for females. The per capita income for the town was $10,202. About 39.9% of families and 40.7% of the population were below the poverty line, including 54.3% of those under age 18 and 34.1% of those age 65 or over.

== History ==
In 1860, there existed Campbell's Mill in Robeson County. That year the Wilmington, Charlotte and Rutherford Railroad constructed an east–west line through the area, but no strong community developed and no train station was erected, probably due to the proximity of the larger communities of Moss Neck and Pates. In 1892, the Wilmington and Weldon Railroad proposed building a north–south line through Moss Neck, but at the opposition of a prominent citizen the line was moved a few miles west to Campbell's Mill. A train station was erected, and the Atlantic Land and Improvement Company plotted one square mile of streets centered around it. Lots were sold to private holders and the community quickly became a center for commerce.

In 1895 the community's population stood at approximately 150 residents. It was incorporated that year as the town of Pembroke, named for railway worker Pembroke Jones. In 1909 the Croatan Normal School was moved there. The earliest buildings in the community were made of wood, with awnings built to cover their entrances. The first brick building was erected in 1922. Around that time, Pates Supply Company, a general store, was established and became the largest business in Pembroke. A highway was established in 1923 along the east–west railroad, and the first street was paved in 1932. Pembroke became a center for Lumbee commercial activity, though most kept to the rural areas of the county. Due to their predominance in the community, the town lacked strict adherence to many Jim Crow norms common in the South in early 20th century.

Under the town's incorporating act, its citizens elected a mayor and a board of commissioners every year. Politically, the town fell under the control of its white minority, though by 1917 the Lumbee community had grown rapidly and was challenging this state of affairs. A white delegation went to Raleigh and petitioned the North Carolina General Assembly to alter the act. Under the new system, the Governor of North Carolina appointed the mayor and the commissioners. Due to an informal agreement the town usually had two Lumbee commissioners and two white commissioners under a white mayor. In 1945 a group of Lumbees petitioned the governor to support democratic reform in the municipal government. Two years later, the town returned to an elected government and Pembroke chose its first Lumbee mayor.

The Old Main building at the University of North Carolina at Pembroke and Pembroke High School, Former are listed on the National Register of Historic Places.

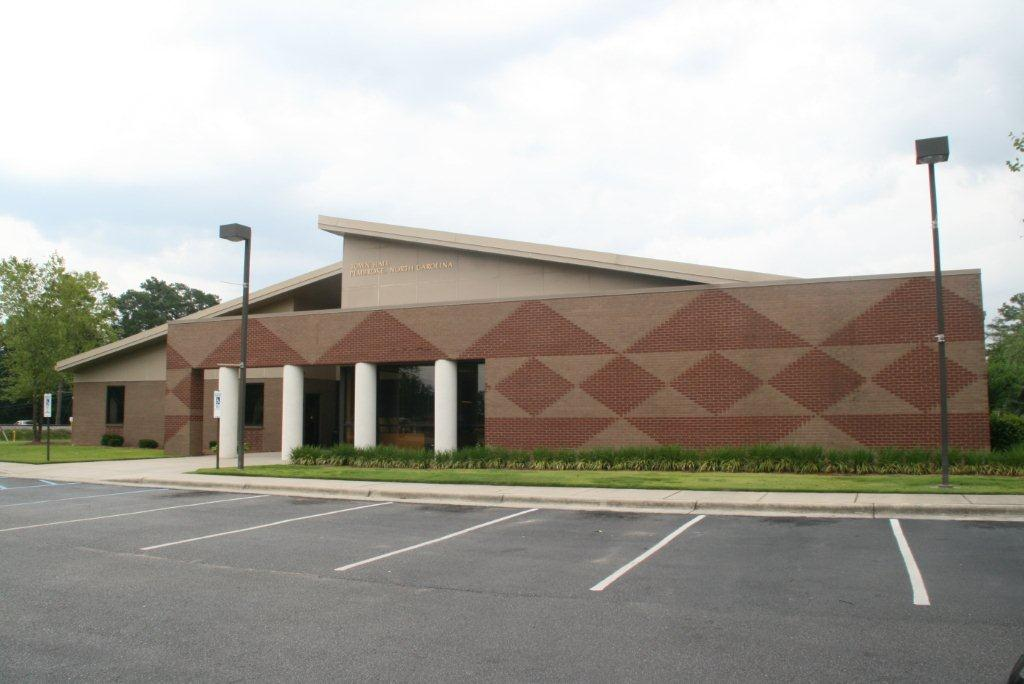
Town hall

Pembroke is the tribal seat of the Lumbee Tribe of North Carolina, the largest state-recognized tribe east of the Mississippi River and the largest without a reservation. Their origin has been disputed historically, as they are multi-tribal. Some tribes migrated from neighboring counties and states. In the 1950s, those who identified as Native American chose the name Lumbee, after what was later renamed the Lumber River.

Pembroke is home to the University of North Carolina at Pembroke, a master's level degree-granting university and one of the 17 schools that comprise the University of North Carolina system. It was incorporated within the University of North Carolina system in 1972 and officially became the University of North Carolina at Pembroke in 1996. Its enrollment is 7,667 as of fall 2022. With an 18:1 student-to-faculty ratio, the average class size is 20. It boasts the safest campus of the UNC schools in U.S. News & World Report and is among the nation's most diverse. Its motto is: "Where learning gets personal."

== Education ==
The only school district in the county is Robeson County Schools.

== Notable people ==
- Nate Andrews, former MLB pitcher and 1944 All-Star selection
- Chris Chavis, professional wrestler better known as "Tatanka" in the WWE
- Harold Collins, former World's Strongest Native American.
- Charly Lowry, singer/songwriter
- Lee McRae, NCAA national champion sprinter and 1987 World champion in the 4x100 meter relay
- Mike McRae, long jumper who represented the United States at the 1984 Summer Olympics
- Ruth Revels, American Indian Activist and educator
- Kelvin Sampson, college basketball head coach

== Works cited ==
- Dial, Adolph L.; Eliades, David K. (1996). The Only Land I Know: A History of the Lumbee Indians (1st Syracuse University Press ed.). Syracuse: Syracuse University Press. ISBN 9780815603603.
- Lowery, Malinda Maynor (2010). Lumbee Indians in the Jim Crow South: Race, Identity, and the Making of a Nation. Chapel Hill: University of North Carolina Press. ISBN 978-0-8078-3368-1.
