= Ar-Razzaq Islamic Center =

First known mosque in North Carolina

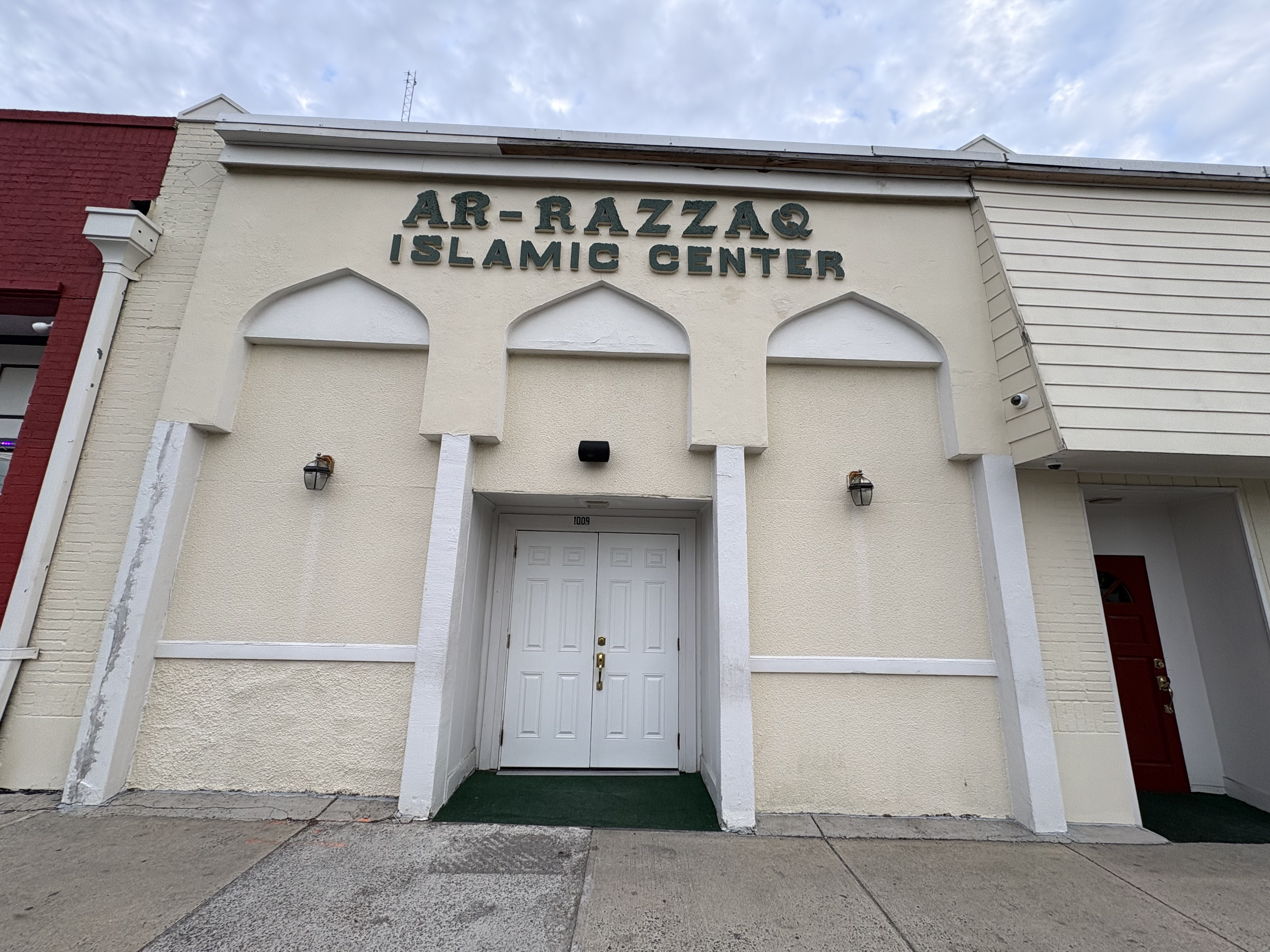
- The mosque in 2026

Religion
- Affiliation: Islam
- Branch/tradition: Sunni (current); Nation of Islam (former)

Location
- Location: 1009 W. Chapel Hill Street; Durham, North Carolina, U.S.
- State: North Carolina
- Country: United States
- Interactive map of Ar-Razzaq Islamic Center
- Coordinates: 35.996645°N 78.915541°W

Architecture
- Type: Mosque
- Established: 1958

Website
- arrazzaqislamiccenter.org

The Ar-Razzaq Islamic Center is the first known mosque established in North Carolina, located in downtown Durham. The name "Ar-Razzaq" means "The Provider" or "The Sustainer", one of the 99 names of God in Islam, chosen to reflect the goals of the mosque to provide services to the local community. The mosque is located in Durham's West End neighborhood, on the border of Burch Avenue Historic District and Morehead Hill Historic District.

== History ==
The Ar-Razzaq Islamic Center was established in 1958 as "Mohammed's Mosque No. 34", a Nation of Islam affiliated mosque, originating from the large African-American Muslim community in the area. The mosque's name was changed in 1972.

In 1963 while James Baldwin, the civil rights activist, was on a lecture tour of North Carolina with Congress of Racial Equality (CORE), a photo was taken of him standing outside of the old storefront. Malcolm X and Muhammad Ali also visited the mosque in the 1960s.

The mosque transitioned to a mainstream Sunni Islam congregation in the 1970s.

Between June 2018 to August 2018, an exhibit was open at the Museum of Durham History, featuring curated photos, oral histories, and keepsakes. Lectures and food markets were also hosted. The mosque had several programs provide humanitarian works, such as a "Clean-Up Squad" that would sweep the streets, and a restaurant (known as the "Shabazz Restaurant") to provide free lunches to children.

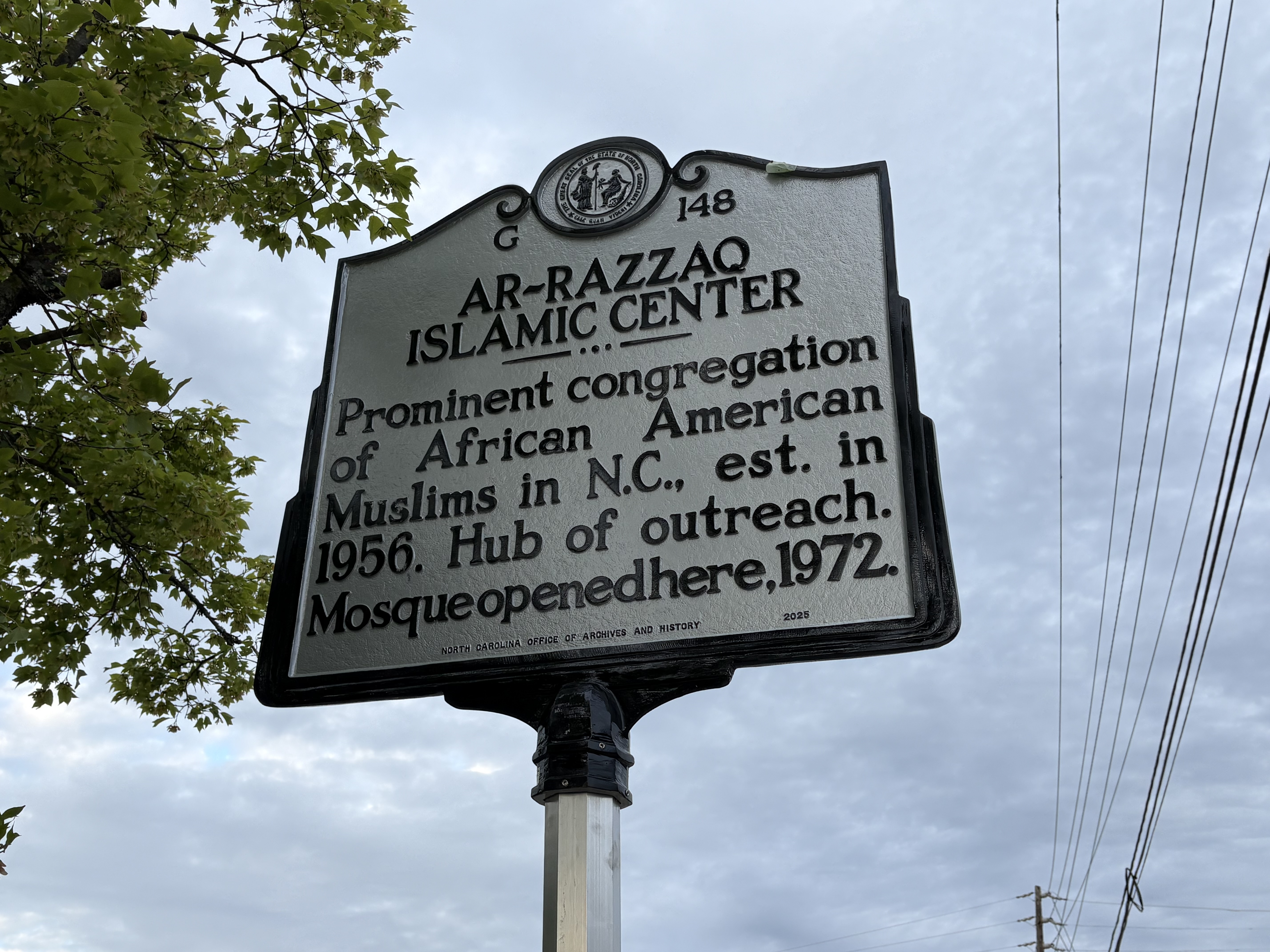
Historical Marker for Ar-Razzaq Islamic Center placed in 2026.

Another exhibit in the Jerry and Bruce Chappell Family Gallery in the Perkins Library at Duke University was open between July 29, 2022 – December 12, 2022. It was reportedly created to "highlight the importance and history of African-American Muslims in Durham's West End neighborhood", as well as displayed information about early presence of Muslims in the Americas.

== List of notable Imams ==
- Shane Atikinson, an Associate Imam, currently also an Associate Imam at As-Salaam Islamic Center, and associate chaplain for Muslim life at Elon University
