= Vernetta Alston =

American politician

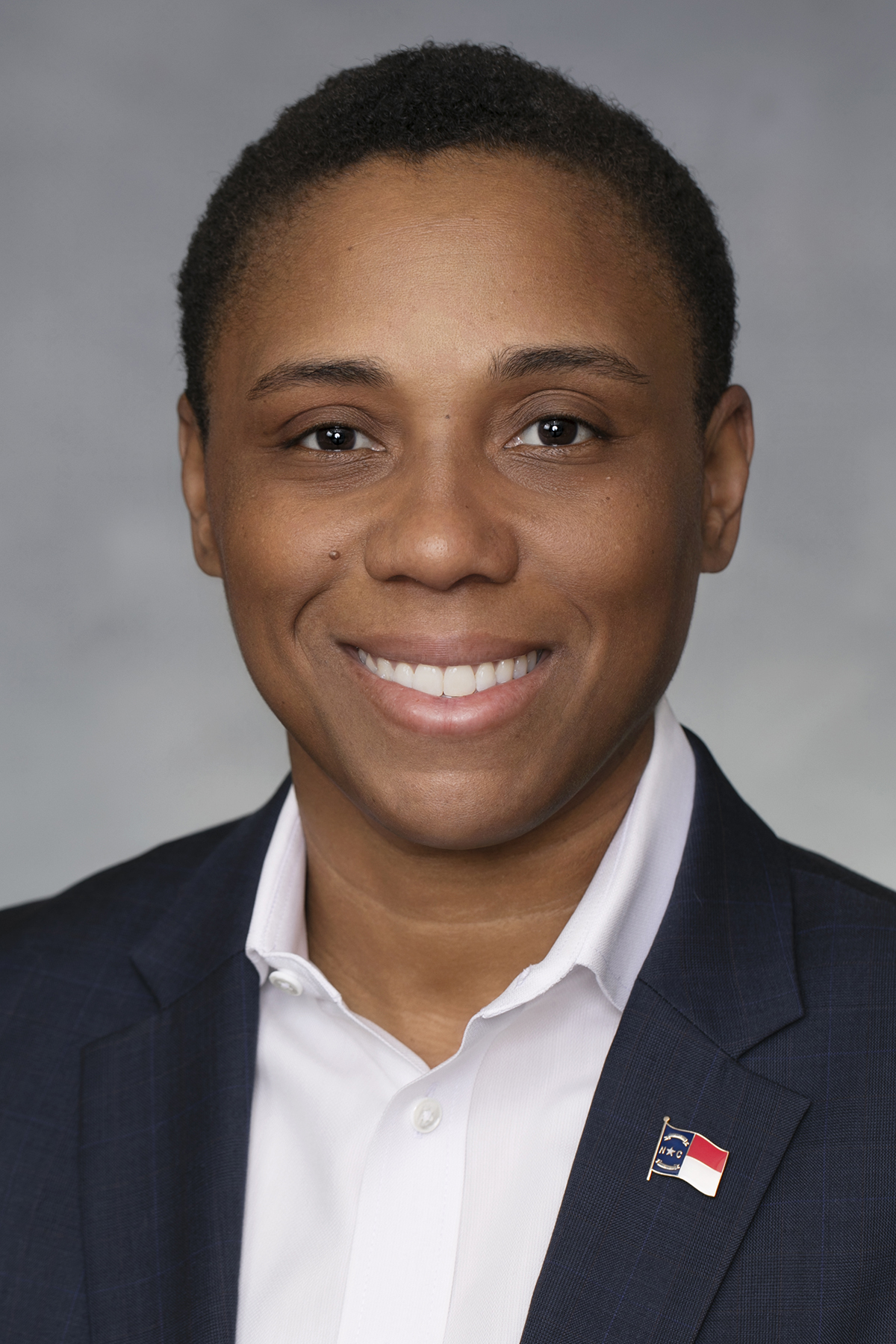

Member of the North Carolina House of Representatives from the 29th district
- Incumbent
- Assumed office April 13, 2020
- Preceded by: MaryAnn Black

Durham City Council Member for Ward 3
- In office 2017–2020
- Succeeded by: Pierce Freelon

Personal details
- Born: Durham, North Carolina, U.S.
- Party: Democratic
- Spouse: Courtney Young
- Children: 2
- Education: Cardinal Gibbons High School
- Alma mater: North Carolina State University (BA); University of North Carolina at Chapel Hill (JD)

Vernetta Alston is an American Democratic politician and attorney. She served on the Durham City Council from 2017 to 2020, when she succeeded MaryAnn Black in the North Carolina House of Representatives.

== Early life and education ==
Alston was born in Durham, North Carolina, and grew up in Cary. She attended Immaculata Catholic School, a private school run by the Order of Friars Minor in Durham. She graduated from Cardinal Gibbons High School, a private Catholic high school in Raleigh. She attended North Carolina State University for undergraduate school and received a J.D. degree from the University of North Carolina School of Law.

== Career ==
=== Law ===
Alston is an attorney, and worked as a staff attorney with N.C. Prison Legal Services and with the North Carolina Center for Death Penalty Litigation for over five years. While working at the center, she served as co-counsel for Henry McCollum, who was exonerated after spending 30 years in prison due to a wrongful conviction.

=== Politics ===
She was elected to the Durham City Council in 2017. While serving on the council, she supported a $95 million affordable housing bond.

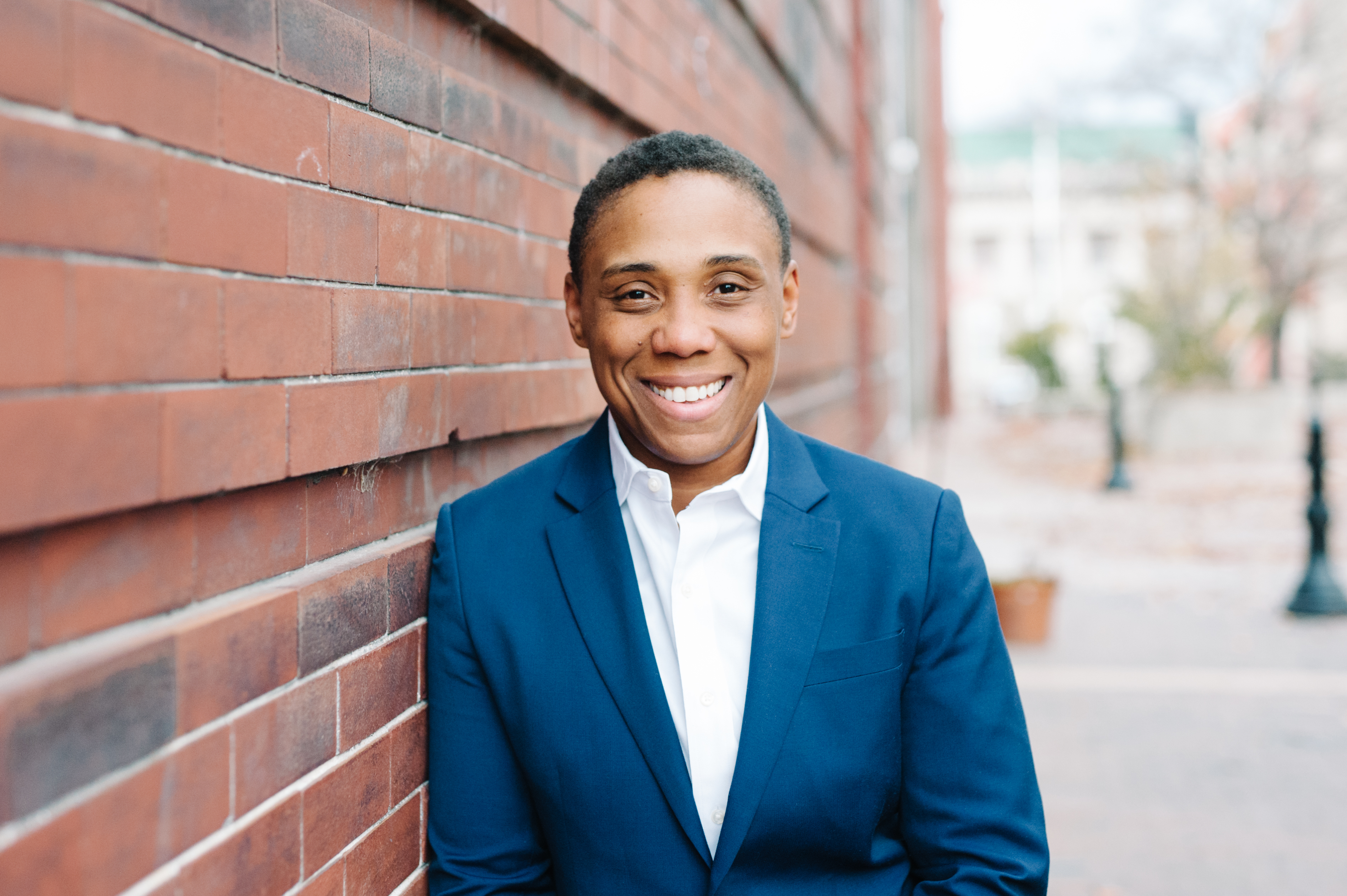
Alston in December, 2019

Alston, along with Mayor Protempore Jillian Johnson, was uninvited from speaking at Immaculata Catholic School in Durham on February 8, 2019, during their Black History Month celebrations. Alston had originally been invited by the school's African-American Heritage Committee as part of the school's "Influential African American Women" theme for the celebrations. The invitation was rescinded after there were threats to protest the event due to Alston and Johnson being openly gay public officials. Fr. Christopher VanHaight, the pastor at Immaculate Conception Catholic Church and Head of Immaculata Catholic School, said he made the decision to rescind the invitation after receiving messages from some school parents voicing concern about having a "pro-gay marriage" politician speak at the school, claiming that Alston speaking would "question the school's commitment to upholding Catholic moral teaching." He also stated that the school "needed a break from politicians." VanHaight's decision was supported by the Roman Catholic Diocese of Raleigh.

Alston responded in a statement, “Immaculata is a religious institution and I believe strongly in the freedom to believe and worship how one chooses, even if a belief conflicts with something fundamental to my own life. That said, adherence to that basic principle means that I can freely say that the Church, by depriving the students at Immaculata of the chance to honor Black history, and in doing so, condemning the lives and rights of the LGTBQ community, is sending a sad, regressive, and life-altering message to our children – that the voices and experiences of those within the Black community can be cancelled and that inclusion is not valued by some who are charged with shaping their character. I reject that message.”

A group of parents from the school including Danielle Sutton, the school's chairwoman of the African-American Heritage Committee, criticized Immaculata's decision. VanHaight later issued an apology and re-invited Alston to speak at the school. Alston spoke at the school in March 2019, and received a standing ovation from the audience.

After the death of North Carolina General Assembly member MaryAnn Black in 2020, Durham Democratic Party officials recommended that Governor Roy Cooper appoint Alston to the vacant seat in the North Carolina House of Representatives. Alston officially resigned from the Durham City Council in April 2020 and was sworn in to the North Carolina House of Representatives on April 14, 2020.

== Personal life ==
Alston is married to Courtney Young. They have two children. They live in Hope Valley Country Club.

North Carolina House of Representatives
Preceded by MaryAnn Black	Member of the North Carolina House of Representatives from the 29th district 2020–present	Incumbent
