= Jordyn Adams =

American baseball player (born 1999)

- Outfielder
- Born: October 18, 1999 (age 27); Gulfport, Mississippi, U.S.
- Batted: Right Threw: Right

MLB debut
- August 2, 2023, for the Los Angeles Angels

Last MLB appearance
- August 10, 2025, for the Baltimore Orioles

MLB statistics
- Batting average: .165
- Home runs: 1
- Runs batted in: 5
- Stats at Baseball Reference

Teams
- Los Angeles Angels (2023–2024); Baltimore Orioles (2025)

Jordyn Bradley Adams (born October 18, 1999) is an American former professional baseball outfielder. He played in Major League Baseball (MLB) for the Los Angeles Angels and Baltimore Orioles from 2023 to 2025. He is committed to play college football as a wide receiver at SMU starting in 2026.

== Amateur career ==
Adams attended Blythewood High School in Blythewood, South Carolina, and transferred to Green Hope High School in Cary, North Carolina, for his senior year. He played both baseball and American football. In July 2017, he played in the Under Armour All-America Baseball Game and hit a walk-off single in the bottom of the 11th inning to give his team the victory. As a senior in football, he had 54 receptions for 1,060 yards and 16 touchdowns. He played in the U.S. Army All-American Bowl. He was also invited to play at the Under Armour All-America Game. Adams committed to the University of North Carolina to play both college football and college baseball. He was rated by 247Sports as a five-star football recruit and ranked among the top players in his class. He was also considered a top prospect for the 2018 Major League Baseball draft.

== Professional career ==
=== Los Angeles Angels ===
Adams was selected 17th overall by the Los Angeles Angels in the draft. He decided against playing college football and signed with the Angels for $3,472,900. He made his professional debut with the Arizona League Angels and was promoted to the rookie–level Orem Owlz in August. His season was ended in late August after suffering a broken jaw that occurred during an outfield collision. In 29 games between the Angels and Owls, Adams batted .267 with 13 RBI.

Adams spent a majority of the 2019 season with the Single–A Burlington Bees, and also played in three games in the Arizona League and nine games with the High–A Inland Empire 66ers. Over 109 games between the three clubs, Adams slashed .257/.351/.369 with eight home runs, 36 RBI, and 16 stolen bases. Adams did not play in a game in 2020 due to the cancellation of the minor league season because of the COVID-19 pandemic. Adams began 2021 with the High–A Tri-City Dust Devils. Over 71 games, he batted .217 with five home runs, 27 RBI, and 18 stolen bases.

He returned to Tri-City to open the 2022 season, and was promoted to the Double–A Rocket City Trash Pandas later in the year. In 120 total games, he batted a cumulative .238/.317/.332 with 4 home runs, 42 RBI, and 33 stolen bases.

Adams was assigned to the Triple–A Salt Lake Bees to begin the 2023 season. In 89 games, he hit .265/.351/.466 with 13 home runs, 60 RBI, and 37 stolen bases. On August 1, 2023, Adams was selected to the 40-man roster and promoted to the major leagues for the first time. On August 2, he made his major league debut against the Atlanta Braves, going 0–for–4 with two strikeouts. In 17 games during his rookie campaign, Adams batted .128/.125/.128 with no home runs, one RBI, and one stolen base.

Adams was optioned to Triple–A Salt Lake to begin the 2024 season. In 11 games for the Angels in 2024, he batted .229/.289/.314 with one home run, four RBI, and two stolen bases. Adams was designated for assignment by Los Angeles on November 19. On November 22, the Angels non–tendered Adams, making him a free agent.

=== Baltimore Orioles ===
On December 19, 2024, Adams signed a minor league contract with the Baltimore Orioles. He played in 39 games for the Triple-A Norfolk Tides, he batted .212/.316/.345 with three home runs, 15 RBI, and five stolen bases. On May 31, 2025, the Orioles selected Adams' contract, adding him to their active roster. In five appearances for Baltimore, he received only one at-bat, in which he flew out. Adams was designated for assignment by the Orioles on June 6. He cleared waivers and was sent outright to Triple-A Norfolk on June 10. On August 1, the Orioles added Adams back to their active roster. He went hitless in three at-bats across five additional appearances for Baltimore; he was removed from the 40-man roster and sent outright to Norfolk on August 19. Adams elected free agency on September 29.

=== Milwaukee Brewers ===
On February 3, 2026, Adams signed a minor league contract with the Milwaukee Brewers. Adams made 27 appearances split between the Double-A Biloxi Shuckers and Triple-A Nashville Sounds, batting a cumulative .198/.298/.363 with three home runs, 16 RBI, and seven stolen bases. He was released by the Brewers organization on May 25.

== Football career ==
Jordyn Adams
SMU Mustangs
- Position: Wide receiver
- Class: Freshman

Personal information
- Born: October 18, 1999 (age 27); Gulfport, Mississippi, U.S.
- Listed height: 6 ft 1 in (1.85 m)
- Listed weight: 181 lb (82 kg)

Career information
- High school: Green Hope (Cary, North Carolina)
- College: SMU (2026–present)

On June 2, 2026, Adams committed to SMU to play college football as a wide receiver.

== Personal ==
His father, Deke Adams, was most recently the defensive line coach for the University of Mississippi football team.
