= Henry McCollum and Leon Brown =

American exonerated men

Henry McCollum
- Born: Henry Lee McCollum; March 26, 1964 (age 62); Jersey City, New Jersey, U.S.
- Known for: Wrongful conviction of the murder of Sabrina Buie
- Judicial status: Exonerated
- Status: Court-ordered release
- Criminal charges: First degree murder; Rape
- Penalty: Death (first-degree murder); Life imprisonment (rape)

Leon Brown
- Born: November 24, 1967 (age 58); Jersey City, New Jersey, U.S.
- Known for: Wrongful conviction of the murder of Sabrina Buie
- Judicial status: Exonerated
- Status: Court-ordered release
- Criminal charges: First degree murder; Rape
- Penalty: Death (first-degree murder) (overturned); Life imprisonment (rape)

Henry Lee McCollum (born March 26, 1964) and Leon Brown (born November 24, 1967) are two African American men who were wrongfully convicted and sentenced to death for a murder they did not commit.

McCollum and Brown were two intellectually disabled teenage brothers, 19 and 15 years old respectively, when a local of Robeson County, North Carolina, implicated them in the 1983 rape and murder of 11-year-old Sabrina Buie. In spite of no physical evidence connecting McCollum or Brown to the crime, interrogators coerced both teens into signing false confessions. At their trials, police and prosecutors suppressed evidence that may have resulted in their acquittals; both were convicted of murder and rape and sentenced to death. U.S. Supreme Court Justice Antonin Scalia later cited McCollum's case as a prime justification for the existence of capital punishment.

McCollum and Brown challenged their convictions for decades. Both men earned a retrial in the 1990s, which resulted in McCollum again being convicted of murder and re-sentenced to death, while Brown was convicted only of rape and re-sentenced to life imprisonment. Following further challenges to their convictions, the North Carolina Innocence Inquiry Commission became involved in their case. Between 2010 and 2014, DNA testing of crime scene evidence revealed that a completely separate man named Roscoe Artis was the actual perpetrator, while McCollum and Brown were innocent. They were both exonerated in 2014. Overall, McCollum and Brown spent almost 31 years in prison. Following their exonerations, McCollum and Brown were awarded $75 million USD, the largest award for a wrongful conviction in United States history.

== Background ==
McCollum and Brown were born in Jersey City, New Jersey, to Mamie Brown, who was a native of Robeson County and had moved to Jersey City with her mother. McCollum and Brown were raised by their grandmother and other relatives in Jersey City housing projects.

Both brothers were identified as having intellectual disabilities early in life. As a child, McCollum was placed in a school for the "educably mentally retarded." When he was 16, a psychologist at McCollum's school suggested moving McCollum to a group home. McCollum dropped out of high school with a second-grade reading level, while Brown could barely read or write by the time of the arrests in 1983. McCollum and Brown had both relocated to Red Springs, North Carolina, where their mother lived, by 1983.

== Murder of Sabrina Buie ==
On September 23, 1983, 11-year-old Sabrina Buie left her home in Red Springs. Early news reports stated that Buie left her home to visit an arcade; Buie's sister, who was 4 at the time of the murder, would later claim that the last time she saw Buie was when Buie told her she was going to return a bicycle belonging to Leon Brown. Her father Ronnie formally reported her missing after she did not return home by September 25. The following day, her body was found with some of her clothes removed. She had been raped and suffocated with her own underwear. The police chief of Red Springs, Luther W. Haggins, described Buie's murder as "one of the most brutal murder cases I've investigated."

The search for Buie lasted two days and involved 20 police officers. At the crime scene, police recovered several pieces of physical evidence, including a cigarette butt, beer cans, articles of Sabrina's bloodied clothing, bloodstained sticks, and a bloodstained board of plywood. Authorities recovered additional physical evidence in a nearby field, where police believed the actual murder occurred before Buie's body was moved to the location where it was found.

== Confessions, arrests, and murder of Joann Brockman ==
On September 28, police invited Henry McCollum to the Robeson County police station for questioning. McCollum claimed he saw Sabrina walking to a store on September 24 but denied any involvement in the crime.

The next day, a 17-year-old Robeson County high school student told police about rumors implicating McCollum in not only Buie's murder, but several alleged crimes in his native Jersey City, including the robbery of a pimp and an attempted rape the year prior. Four days later, and again in 2014, that high school student would admit to having fabricated the stories implicating McCollum merely because she thought McCollum "acted strange." However, in 1983, the stories convinced police to further question McCollum. McCollum then underwent an hours-long interrogation, during which the police told McCollum that a witness placed him at the crime scene. They also used racial slurs towards McCollum and assured him that if he signed a form waiving his Miranda rights and confessed, he could leave. McCollum did not have an attorney present during the interrogation. After being promised his freedom upon confessing, McCollum signed a false confession to the crime wherein he repeated the same incriminating accusations that police used to extract his confession from him. McCollum also claimed to have committed the gang rape and murder of Buie with four other teenage boys in the area, including then-15-year-old Leon Brown.

During McCollum's interrogation, Leon Brown arrived at the station with his mother and sister in tow. Brown's interrogation featured similar coercion; in a 2019 lawsuit, Brown accused Robeson County detective Joel Locklear of threatening Brown with death in North Carolina's gas chamber if he refused to sign away his Miranda rights. According to Brown, Detective Locklear then drafted a confession implicating Brown, McCollum, and the three other teenagers in the crime. The three others accused had airtight alibis or were otherwise proven to have not been connected to the crime, and one was out of state at the time of Buie's murder. As Brown was nearly illiterate, rather than leaving a signature on his confession, he wrote his name in block letters.

McCollum's interrogation ended at 2:30 am, after which McCollum started to walk out of the police station. When authorities asked where he was going, he said police told him he could leave when the interview was over, and he asked, "Can I go home now?" He was then arrested. After his exoneration, when discussing his interrogation, McCollum recounted, "I'd never been under such pressure, people yelling and screaming at me. I was scared and was just trying to get out of that police station and go home."

There were numerous inconsistencies between McCollum's confession and Brown's confession, which conflicted in details regarding who was involved in the crime, how McCollum and Brown met the victim, how they committed Buie's murder, and why the other boys implicated in their confessions were unable to be tied to the crime due to their alibis. Despite those inconsistencies, Brown was also arrested. Later on September 29, authorities charged McCollum and Brown with Buie's rape and murder. McCollum was held at the Robeson County jail without bond, while Brown was held at a juvenile facility in Fayetteville, in Cumberland County, North Carolina. No charges were ever filed against the other three teenagers implicated in McCollum and Brown's signed confessions.

McCollum and Brown's attorneys later stated that both McCollum's and Brown's confessions were coerced due to both teens' intellectual disabilities, as McCollum's IQ was measured as low as 51, and Brown's IQ was measured at 49. The American Psychiatric Association generally considers IQs measured below 70 to be indicative of intellectual disability. McCollum also had brain damage and an "extremely low" ability to comprehend language. During a later trial, neuropsychologists would testify that McCollum did not have the intellectual capacity to understand his Miranda rights or the language authorities used in writing the confession he signed.

=== Murder of Joann Brockman ===
On October 22, 1983, while McCollum and Brown were in jail awaiting trial for Buie's murder, a missing persons report was filed for 18-year-old Joann Brockman. Later that same day, her body was found; she had been raped and strangled. Witnesses claimed to have seen Brockman with then 43-year-old Roscoe Artis, a serial rapist, suspected serial killer, and habitual sexual offender who lived near the Buie family and "within feet" of where Buie's body was found. Artis's history of sexual assaults on women dated back to 1957, and at the time of Buie and Brockman's murders, he was suspected in the 1980 rape and murder of 30-year-old Bernice Moss in Gaston County, North Carolina. Artis quickly confessed to Brockman's murder. Over the course of several interviews, Artis also suggested that McCollum and Brown were not responsible for Buie's murder.

In August 1984, Artis was sentenced to death for Brockman's murder, although his death sentence was later reduced to life imprisonment in 1989. Before the commutation of his death sentence in Brockman's case, Artis repeatedly told another North Carolina death row inmate that McCollum and Brown were innocent of Buie's murder.

== Trials ==
=== First trial ===
In October 1984, McCollum and Brown faced their first joint trial in Robeson County. Their prosecutor, Robeson and Scotland County District Attorney Joe Freeman Britt, prided himself on his exorbitantly high number of death penalty cases, to the point where Guinness World Records named him the "deadliest prosecutor in America" around 1988. Both shortly before and after McCollum and Brown's exonerations, Britt's enthusiastic prosecution of the brothers would come under scrutiny, given that, despite the fact that Britt had prosecuted Artis for Brockman's very similar murder earlier in the year, Britt had overlooked compelling evidence that implicated Artis in the murder of Buie.

The prosecution team's main pieces of evidence against McCollum and Brown were the signed confessions. Another witness for the prosecution, 17-year-old L.P. Sinclair, claimed to have heard McCollum and Brown talking about wanting to rape Buie prior to the crime and that McCollum confessed to the crime after the murder. Under cross-examination, however, Sinclair admitted that police had interviewed him three times before McCollum and Brown's arrests and that he never implicated either teenager in his interviews. Fingerprints lifted from the beer cans found at the scene of the crime did not match McCollum or Brown, and there was otherwise no physical or forensic evidence linking them to the murder. Nevertheless, both were convicted of first degree murder and rape on October 25, 1984, and sentenced to death. At 16, Brown's death sentence made him the youngest person on North Carolina's death row at the time.

=== Second trial ===
In 1988, the North Carolina Supreme Court overturned both McCollum's and Brown's death sentences due to the trial judge neglecting to provide proper instructions to the jury relating to their duty to consider each defendant's guilt or innocence separately. The judge also determined that McCollum and Brown were entitled to separate trials.

In 1991, McCollum was again convicted of first degree murder and rape and sentenced to death. Brown's retrial occurred in 1992, but his jury convicted him only of Buie's rape and sentenced him to life imprisonment. Brown's conviction for rape was upheld in 1995, leaving him with exhausted appeals options.

== Imprisonment ==
McCollum worked as a janitor during his time on death row. His attorneys said he was deeply affected and traumatized by each execution of other North Carolina death row inmates. He was "severely depressed" and would become suicidal during other inmates' executions. His attorneys also said other inmates targeted McCollum for violence and abuse due to his alleged victim being a young girl. Following the execution of John Rook in 1986, McCollum attempted suicide. In an interview shortly before his release, McCollum said Rook was his first friend on death row, adding, "I didn’t look at him like a killer. People do change in prison. That man was like a brother to me." McCollum experienced the executions of 42 North Carolina death row inmates during his stay and once said, "I'm tired. I don't know when they are going to kill me."

Brown had multiple episodes of psychosis during his imprisonment which worsened after his release. He was noncompliant with taking his antipsychotics. Brown recounted to his sister that during his imprisonment, he was raped by inmates, and guards would tie him to his bunk. He would rock in place and refuse to eat or drink for days.

Brown also learned how to read. McCollum and Brown visited each other annually until 2012, after which they wrote to each other every month. Also during their imprisonment, the brothers' grandmother and mother died.

== Release ==
=== Re-testing of old and withheld evidence ===
McCollum and Brown continued to challenge their convictions alongside their attorneys. During one re-investigation of the case, their attorneys discovered that on October 5, 1984, three days prior to McCollum and Brown's first trial, police from Red Springs had asked the North Carolina State Bureau of Investigation to complete a fingerprint comparison between the prints found on the beer cans and the prints collected from Artis after his confession for the murder of Joann Brockman. The request was never disclosed to McCollum's or Brown's attorneys, and no documents confirmed that the comparison was ever completed, although there was evidence that on the same day, Britt cancelled the request without any explanation.

In 2004, McCollum requested that some of the DNA evidence from the crime scene be retested. As a result, a court ordered DNA testing on the cigarette butt found near Buie's body. The DNA profile did not match McCollum or Brown. Due to limitations in DNA testing at the time, there was no way to definitively match the DNA profile to another suspect, so the test results were deemed insufficient to warrant the release of either man from prison.

Around 2010, a fellow inmate suggested that Brown request help from the North Carolina Innocence Inquiry Commission. Brown's disabilities prevented him from filling out the commission's form himself, so another inmate had to fill it out for him. The Commission agreed to look at Brown's case in 2010 and requested a comparison of the DNA evidence collected at Buie's crime scene to other profiles in the state police database. This DNA testing confirmed a match with Roscoe Artis. The Innocence Inquiry Commission spent another four years investigating the case, analyzing physical evidence, and interviewing Artis and other inmates, and came to the conclusion that the Red Springs Police Department had exculpatory evidence all along and deliberately withheld it from McCollum's and Brown's defense teams. The Innocence Inquiry Commission also requested that the DNA profile from boxes of evidence collected from Buie's murder be put through the Combined DNA Index System (also known as CODIS), the United States national DNA database. In July 2014, the testing returned yet another positive match to Roscoe Artis. It was after the CODIS testing that McCollum and Brown's attorneys unearthed Artis's history of sexual assaults.

In August 2014, lawyers working for the North Carolina's Center for Death Penalty Litigation filed a motion requesting the overturning of the brothers' convictions and dismissal of charges against them. The motion included an affidavit from the death row inmate with whom Artis had discussed Buie's case, Andrew "Sonny" Craig. Craig, who had since been removed from death row, confirmed that Artis had denied McCollum and Brown's involvement in the murder, although Artis stopped short of confessing to the murder himself. Craig alleged that Artis "seemed burdened by living with guilt for so long" due to withholding evidence that could have freed McCollum and Brown. Artis also relayed specific obscure information about the murder to Craig, including the method of killing Buie and the color of her underwear. Based on the evidence contained in their motion, McCollum and Brown's attorneys were granted a hearing, to take place in September 2014.

=== Exoneration ===
The day of the exonerations, Richard Dieter, the executive director of the Death Penalty Information Center, released a statement which read:

"The conviction and sentencing to death of two black teenagers with intellectual disabilities (mental retardation), based almost entirely on shaky confessions obtained under extreme duress, sounds like a case from another era. It would be naïve to assume there are no more such cases among the thousands of inmates who remain on death row, or that similar mistakes weren't made among the nearly 1,400 people who have been executed. McCollum and Brown lost 30 years of their lives due to this injustice. If they had been executed as planned, the price would have been infinitely higher. Taking the death penalty off the table would at least guarantee that innocent people will not be executed."

On September 2, 2014, staff from the Innocence Inquiry Commission and the brothers' defense attorneys presented evidence of their clients' innocence at a hearing and requested that a Robeson County judge free both men. Robeson County District Attorney Johnson Britt did not oppose the request, saying, "The state does not have a case," and, "The whole case rests on the confessions, and the DNA evidence threw those confessions under the bus."

After hearing the evidence, rather than granting the brothers a new trial, the judge declared McCollum and Brown innocent. McCollum was still shackled during the hearing in which he was formally exonerated. Many of his and Brown's family members were present, including McCollum's father James, who stated after the hearing, "We waited all these long years for this. Thank you, Jesus." Also in attendance were a judge who had once voted to affirm McCollum's death sentence, and some of Buie's family members.

Due to McCollum, Brown, and their attorneys needing to file paperwork to confirm the men's releases from prison, their release was delayed until the next day, September 3.

At the time of his release, McCollum was the longest-serving death row inmate in North Carolina's history, having spent almost 31 years under sentence of death.

== Settlements ==
=== State settlement ===
Upon release, McCollum and Brown received $45 each. They were ineligible for any more money because they had not been formally pardoned. Until their formal pardons, they lived off of charity money.

In June 2015, North Carolina Governor Pat McCrory formally pardoned Henry McCollum and Leon Brown, calling it "the right thing to do." Governor McCrory's pardon permitted the brothers to seek compensation for wrongful imprisonment. At the time of McCollum and Brown's request for a pardon, their prosecutor, Joe Freeman Britt, still opposed their request for a pardon and compensation.

In August, McCollum and Brown filed a federal civil rights suit requesting compensation for their wrongful imprisonment, seeking damages from the Robeson County Sheriff's Office, several officers in that department, the North Carolina State Bureau of Investigation, several NCSBI agents including lead investigators Leroy Allen and Ken Snead, the town of Red Springs, the Red Springs Police Chief Lester Haggins (who died in 2013), and two officers who led the investigation against McCollum and Brown, Paul Canady and Larry Floyd. In September, McCollum and Brown were awarded the maximum amount allowed in state compensation, $750,000 USD. Two years later, in December 2017, Red Springs, Paul Canady, Larry Floyd, and Lester Haggins' estate individually settled for US$500,000 for Brown and McCollum.

==== Financial predation ====
Per The Marshall Project, McCollum and Brown's status as exonerees made them prime targets for predatory interests who siphoned off their compensatory money from the state, to the point where a federal judge had to intervene in the spring of 2017. By the time of the intervention, the brothers' compensation had been almost completely spent on predatory loans, excessive legal fees, cars, women's jewelry, and children's toys, between several people who claimed to have their best interests in mind, including a sister, a lawyer, and several advocates. The Marshall Project suggested that McCollum and Brown's intellectual disabilities made them even more susceptible to financial predation than most exonerees. In an April 2017 interview, Paul Megaro, one of the attorneys who would later be found to have financially taken advantage of McCollum and Brown, denied the allegations of swindling his clients, claiming, "I like these guys. They are nice people, even if they are mentally disabled. It doesn't matter."

In March 2021, a multi-day disciplinary hearing found that Megaro had lied to a judge and put his own financial interests above those of his clients, resulting in the suspension of Megaro's license to practice law in the state for five years; Megaro was also ordered to repay $250,000 in state compensation money he had taken from McCollum and Brown as payment for his services.

=== Federal settlement ===
During a May 14, 2021 federal hearing to determine further compensation for McCollum and Brown, an attorney for NSCBI agents Leroy Allen and Ken Snead used his closing arguments to maintain that the men were still guilty, continuing to call them rapists and murderers despite their exoneration seven years prior. His arguments earned sustained objections from United States District Judge Terrence Boyle, who had to remind the jury, "His argument that the brothers are rapists and murderers is inappropriate."

Later on May 14, a federal jury awarded McCollum and Brown with a cumulative US$75 million. Each received $31 million, one for each year of their incarceration, along with $13 million in punitive damages. The damages were assessed against Allen and Snead, the latter of whom had died in 2019. Also on the same day, the Robeson County Sheriff's Office settled its part of the case for US$9 million. The $75 million award was the largest wrongful conviction award in United States history, as well as the largest personal injury case award in South Carolina history. An attorney working for McCollum and Brown suggested that the size of the award was meant to send a message against law enforcement misconduct, especially at the expense of marginalized people like McCollum and Brown. In March 2023, the 4th U.S. Circuit Court of Appeals upheld the jury's conviction and sentence but reduced the amount awarded by the trial judge by $36 million, from the final amount of $75 million. The appeals judges reduced the amount by an additional $10 million based on previous settlements with other defendants in the case. A lower court must decide whether to subtract an additional $1.5 million to consider a payment from the state government. Therefore, instead of receiving US$111 million, the two brothers are now expected to receive between US$63.5 and US$65 million, depending on future developments in the legal process. The 4th Circuit affirmed the trial court’s decision to award $6.25 million in attorneys’ fees.

== Analysis and aftermath ==
The News & Observer and The New York Times pointed out how the notoriety around McCollum and Brown's case led to its heavy and racialized politicization in the area. The North Carolina Republican Party used McCollum's booking photograph in campaign mailings meant to generate fear in locals, including campaign fliers as recently as 2010 accusing legislators in the North Carolina Democratic Party of being "soft on crime" for passing the Racial Justice Act, which allowed North Carolina death row inmates to challenge their death sentences based on evidence of racism.

Justices of the Supreme Court of the United States, including Antonin Scalia, used McCollum's case not only to justify the death penalty, but to underscore the supposed prevalence of "wild teen killers." In rejecting a request from McCollum's attorneys to review his case, Scalia described McCollum's crime as so heinous, that it made it difficult to argue against lethal injection. In a dissent, Justice Harry Blackmun noted McCollum's low IQ and mental age of a 9-year-old in arguing that the death penalty for McCollum would be unconstitutional. Scalia also brought up McCollum in a separate opinion completely unrelated to McCollum's case, citing Buie's murder as the type of crime that makes the death penalty necessary in the United States. In 2015, a year after McCollum's exoneration, Justice Stephen Breyer brought up McCollum's case as an example of why the death penalty is unconstitutional.

In 2017, North Carolina's Center for Death Penalty Litigation wrote, "Henry and Leon's case is not so much a lesson in how wrongful convictions are uncovered as it is a warning of how easily they can be missed entirely. If not for that single cigarette butt, Henry and Leon would likely have remained in prison for the rest of their lives. Henry might have been executed."

=== Aftermath ===
Ken Snead, the lead investigator in Buie's murder, told the Raleigh-based newspaper The News & Observer that he believed McCollum's and Brown's confessions were true, even after DNA evidence had excluded them as possible suspects. He alleged that McCollum's and Brown's confessions contained information that only someone who committed the crime could have known. McCollum and Brown's attorneys maintained that their clients were fed information collected by police, namely Leroy Allen, who had attended Buie's autopsy the day before the confessions.

Leon Brown's time on death row and long imprisonment afterwards caused him significant mental health problems. Upon his release, he required full-time care. Between 2015 and 2018, he was confined to psychiatric hospitals seven times. In 2018, Brown lived in a group home in North Carolina, although he opposed the living arrangement, claiming, "A judge put me here. I want my freedom." Brown also expressed interest in starting his own church or radio Christian ministry.

Henry McCollum relocated to Virginia with his fiancée. He also began writing a book about his life and expressed a desire to move Leon Brown to Virginia with him so the two could "rebuild what was taken from them."

Roscoe Artis died at the age of 82 while serving a life sentence in North Carolina's Warren Correctional Institution on December 15, 2020.

== See also ==
- Overturned convictions in the United States
- List of wrongful convictions in the United States
