= North Carolina's 29th House district =

American legislative district

North Carolina's 29th State House of Representatives district
Representative
Vernetta Alston; D–Durham
- Demographics: 45% White; 30% Black; 13% Hispanic; 6% Asian; 1% Other; 5% Multiracial
- Population (2024): 94,576

North Carolina's 29th House district is one of 120 districts in the North Carolina House of Representatives. It has been represented by Democrat Vernetta Alston since 2020.

== Geography ==
Since 2003, the district has included part of Durham County. The district overlaps with the 20th and 22nd Senate districts.

== District officeholders ==
=== Single-member district ===
Representative	Party	Dates	Notes	Counties
District created January 1, 1967.
Thomas Hunter (Rockingham)	Democratic	January 1, 1967 – January 1, 1969		1967–1973; All of Richmond County.
John Covington Jr. (Rockingham)	Democratic	January 1, 1969 – January 1, 1971		1967–1973; All of Richmond County.
Thomas Hunter (Rockingham)	Democratic	January 1, 1971 – January 1, 1973	Redistricted to the 27th district.	1967–1973; All of Richmond County.

=== Multi-member district ===
Representative	Party	Dates	Notes	Representative	Party	Dates	Notes	Representative	Party	Dates	Notes	Representative	Party	Dates	Notes	Representative	Party	Dates	Notes	Counties
E. Lawrence Davis (Winston-Salem)	Democratic	January 1, 1973 – January 1, 1975	Redistricted from the 30th district. Retired to run for State Senate.	Fred Hutchins Jr. (Winston-Salem)	Republican	January 1, 1973 – January 1, 1977		Edward Powell (Winston-Salem)	Republican	January 1, 1973 – January 1, 1975		C. Dempsey McDaniel (Kernersville)	Republican	January 1, 1973 – January 1, 1975	Redistricted from the 30th district.	E. M. McKnight (Clemmons)	Republican	January 1, 1973 – January 1, 1975	Redistricted from the 30th district.	1973–1983; All of Forsyth County.
Judson DeRamus Jr. (Winston-Salem)	Democratic	January 1, 1975 – January 1, 1981		Fred Hutchins Jr. (Winston-Salem)	Republican	January 1, 1973 – January 1, 1977		Richard Erwin (Winston-Salem)	Democratic	January 1, 1975 – January 3, 1978	Resigned to become North Carolina Court of Appeals Judge.	Margaret Tennille (Winston-Salem)	Democratic	January 1, 1975 – January 1, 1983	Redistricted to the 39th district.	Ned Smith (Winston-Salem)	Democratic	January 1, 1975 – January 1, 1979		1973–1983; All of Forsyth County.
Judson DeRamus Jr. (Winston-Salem)	Democratic	January 1, 1975 – January 1, 1981		Ted Kaplan (Winston-Salem)	Democratic	January 1, 1977 – January 1, 1983		Richard Erwin (Winston-Salem)	Democratic	January 1, 1975 – January 3, 1978	Resigned to become North Carolina Court of Appeals Judge.	Margaret Tennille (Winston-Salem)	Democratic	January 1, 1975 – January 1, 1983	Redistricted to the 39th district.	Ned Smith (Winston-Salem)	Democratic	January 1, 1975 – January 1, 1979		1973–1983; All of Forsyth County.
Judson DeRamus Jr. (Winston-Salem)	Democratic	January 1, 1975 – January 1, 1981		Ted Kaplan (Winston-Salem)	Democratic	January 1, 1977 – January 1, 1983		Vacant		January 3, 1978 – February 17, 1978		Margaret Tennille (Winston-Salem)	Democratic	January 1, 1975 – January 1, 1983	Redistricted to the 39th district.	Ned Smith (Winston-Salem)	Democratic	January 1, 1975 – January 1, 1979		1973–1983; All of Forsyth County.
Judson DeRamus Jr. (Winston-Salem)	Democratic	January 1, 1975 – January 1, 1981		Ted Kaplan (Winston-Salem)	Democratic	January 1, 1977 – January 1, 1983		Harold Kennedy (Winston-Salem)	Democratic	February 17, 1978 – January 1, 1979	Appointed to finish Erwin's term.	Margaret Tennille (Winston-Salem)	Democratic	January 1, 1975 – January 1, 1983	Redistricted to the 39th district.	Ned Smith (Winston-Salem)	Democratic	January 1, 1975 – January 1, 1979		1973–1983; All of Forsyth County.
Judson DeRamus Jr. (Winston-Salem)	Democratic	January 1, 1975 – January 1, 1981		Ted Kaplan (Winston-Salem)	Democratic	January 1, 1977 – January 1, 1983		Richard Barnes (Winston-Salem)	Democratic	January 1, 1979 – January 1, 1983	Redistricted to the 39th district and retired to run for State Senate.	Margaret Tennille (Winston-Salem)	Democratic	January 1, 1975 – January 1, 1983	Redistricted to the 39th district.	Mary Pegg (Winston-Salem)	Republican	January 1, 1979 – January 1, 1983		1973–1983; All of Forsyth County.
Ned Smith (Winston-Salem)	Democratic	January 1, 1981 – January 1, 1983		Ted Kaplan (Winston-Salem)	Democratic	January 1, 1977 – January 1, 1983		Richard Barnes (Winston-Salem)	Democratic	January 1, 1979 – January 1, 1983	Redistricted to the 39th district and retired to run for State Senate.	Margaret Tennille (Winston-Salem)	Democratic	January 1, 1975 – January 1, 1983	Redistricted to the 39th district.	Mary Pegg (Winston-Salem)	Republican	January 1, 1979 – January 1, 1983		1973–1983; All of Forsyth County.

=== Single-member district ===
Representative	Party	Dates	Notes	Counties
William Grimsley Jr. (Summerfield)	Democratic	January 1, 1983 – January 1, 1985		1983–1993; Parts of Guilford and Forsyth counties.
Michael Decker (Walkertown)	Republican	January 1, 1985 – January 1, 1993	Redistricted to the 84th district.	1983–1993; Parts of Guilford and Forsyth counties.
Joanne Bowie (Greensboro)	Republican	January 1, 1993 – January 1, 2003	Redistricted from the 27th district. Redistricted to the 57th district.	1993–2003; Part of Guilford County.
Paul Miller (Durham)	Democratic	January 1, 2003 – July 7, 2006	Redistricted from the 23rd district. Resigned.	2003–Present; Part of Durham County.
Vacant		July 7, 2006 – July 11, 2006		2003–Present; Part of Durham County.
Larry Hall (Durham)	Democratic	July 11, 2006 – January 11, 2017	Appointed to finish Miller's term. Resigned.	2003–Present; Part of Durham County.
Vacant		January 11, 2017 – February 15, 2017		2003–Present; Part of Durham County.
MaryAnn Black (Durham)	Democratic	February 15, 2017 – March 25, 2020	Appointed to finish Hall's term. Died.	2003–Present; Part of Durham County.
Vacant		March 25, 2020 – April 13, 2020		2003–Present; Part of Durham County.
Vernetta Alston (Durham)	Democratic	April 13, 2020 – Present	Appointed to finish Black's term.	2003–Present; Part of Durham County.

== Election results ==
=== 2024 ===
North Carolina House of Representatives 29th district general election, 2024
Party	Candidate	Votes	%
Democratic	Vernetta Alston (incumbent)	47,945	100%
Total votes		47,945	100%
Democratic hold			

=== 2022 ===
North Carolina House of Representatives 29th district general election, 2022
Party	Candidate	Votes	%
Democratic	Vernetta Alston (incumbent)	35,220	100%
Total votes		35,220	100%
Democratic hold			

=== 2020 ===
North Carolina House of Representatives 29th district general election, 2020
Party	Candidate	Votes	%
Democratic	Vernetta Alston (incumbent)	44,930	100%
Total votes		44,930	100%
Democratic hold			

=== 2018 ===
North Carolina House of Representatives 29th district general election, 2018
Party	Candidate	Votes	%
Democratic	MaryAnn Black (incumbent)	32,757	88.15%
Republican	Charles Becker	4,402	11.85%
Total votes		37,159	100%
Democratic hold			

=== 2016 ===
North Carolina House of Representatives 29th district general election, 2016
Party	Candidate	Votes	%
Democratic	Larry Hall (incumbent)	39,607	100%
Total votes		39,607	100%
Democratic hold			

=== 2014 ===
North Carolina House of Representatives 29th district general election, 2014
Party	Candidate	Votes	%
Democratic	Larry Hall (incumbent)	22,667	100%
Total votes		22,667	100%
Democratic hold			

=== 2012 ===
North Carolina House of Representatives 29th district general election, 2012
Party	Candidate	Votes	%
Democratic	Larry Hall (incumbent)	38,181	100%
Total votes		38,181	100%
Democratic hold			

=== 2010 ===
North Carolina House of Representatives 29th district general election, 2010
Party	Candidate	Votes	%
Democratic	Larry Hall (incumbent)	18,130	100%
Total votes		18,130	100%
Democratic hold			

=== 2008 ===
North Carolina House of Representatives 29th district general election, 2008
Party	Candidate	Votes	%
Democratic	Larry Hall (incumbent)	31,254	90.73%
Libertarian	Justin Lallinger	3,219	9.27%
Total votes		34,473	100%
Democratic hold			

=== 2006 ===
North Carolina House of Representatives 29th district Democratic primary election, 2006
Party	Candidate	Votes	%
Democratic	Larry Hall	2,190	29.82%
Democratic	Sandy Ogburn	1,917	26.10%
Democratic	Mary D. Jacobs	1,552	21.13%
Democratic	T. Brock Winslow	1,099	14.96%
Democratic	Angela V. Langley	586	7.98%
Total votes		7,344	100%

North Carolina House of Representatives 29th district Democratic primary run-off election, 2006
Party	Candidate	Votes	%
Democratic	Larry Hall	1,633	55.47%
Democratic	Sandy Ogburn	1,311	44.53%
Total votes		2,944	100%

North Carolina House of Representatives 29th district general election, 2006
Party	Candidate	Votes	%
Democratic	Larry Hall (incumbent)	13,295	100%
Total votes		13,295	100%
Democratic hold			

=== 2004 ===
North Carolina House of Representatives 29th district general election, 2004
Party	Candidate	Votes	%
Democratic	Paul Miller (incumbent)	27,249	100%
Total votes		27,249	100%
Democratic hold			

=== 2002 ===
North Carolina House of Representatives 29th district general election, 2002
Party	Candidate	Votes	%
Democratic	Paul Miller (incumbent)	15,152	100%
Total votes		15,152	100%
Democratic hold			

=== 2000 ===
North Carolina House of Representatives 29th district general election, 2000
Party	Candidate	Votes	%
Republican	Joanne Bowie (incumbent)	25,045	100%
Total votes		25,045	100%
Republican hold			
