= Green Hope High School =

Coordinates: 35.80502°N 78.86742°W

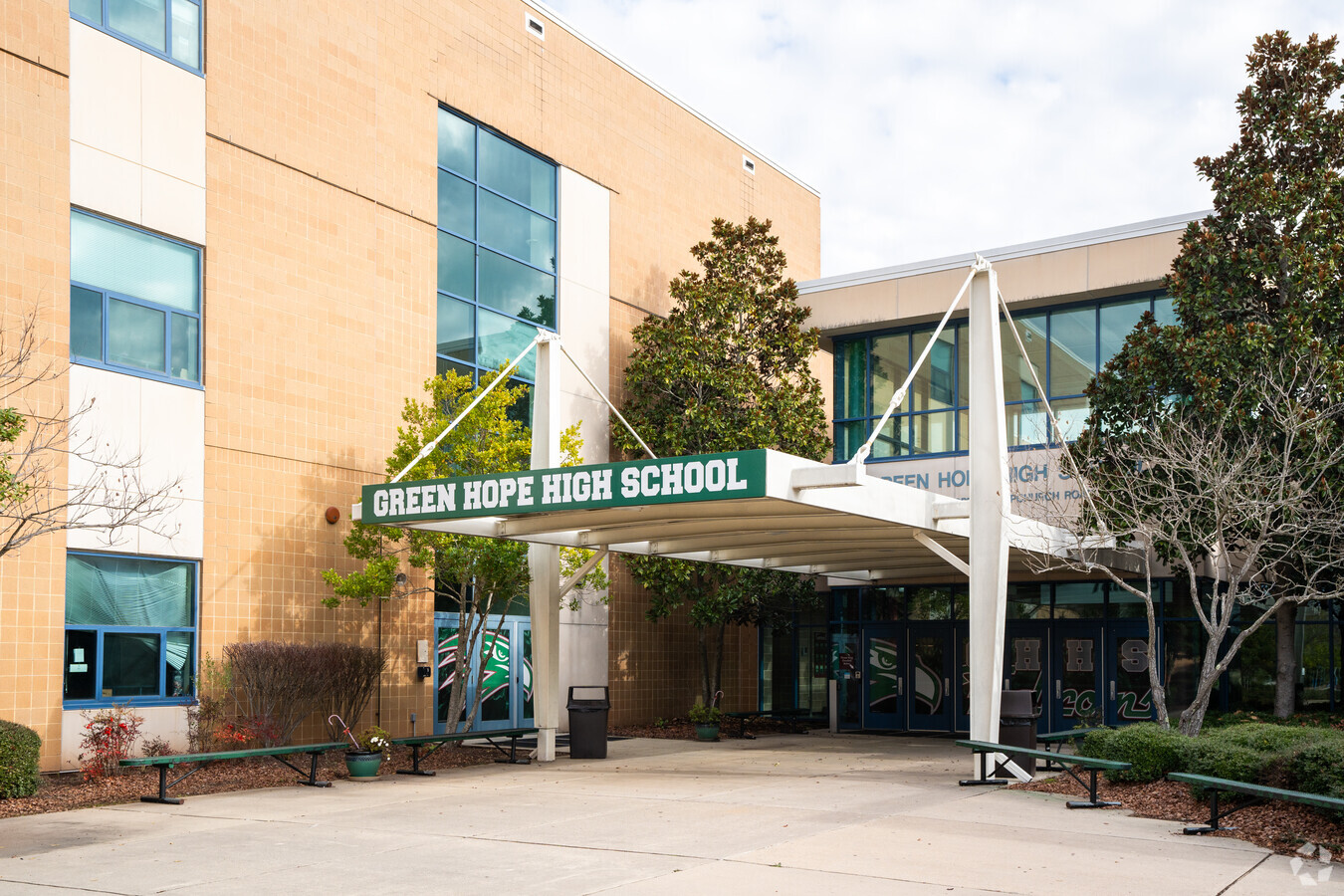
- Front Entrance, 2024

Location
- 2500 Carpenter Upchurch Road; Cary, North Carolina 27519; United States

Information
- Type: Public
- Mottoes: Dare to Soar; Vivere, discere, vincere (To live, to learn, to win)
- Established: 1999 (27 years ago)
- School district: Wake County Public School System
- NCES District ID: 3704720
- CEEB code: 342709
- NCES School ID: 370472002489
- Principal: Alison Cleveland
- Teaching staff: 112.33 (FTE)
- Grades: 9–12
- Enrollment: 2,304 (2024–2025)
- Student to teacher ratio: 20.51
- Colors: Burgundy and green
- Athletics: NCHSAA 8A
- Athletics conference: Quad City Seven 8A
- Mascot: Falcon
- Newspaper: The Green Hope Falcon
- Yearbook: The Talon
- Website: Green Hope High School

Green Hope High School is a secondary school located at 2500 Carpenter Upchurch Road in Cary, North Carolina. It is a part of the Wake County Public School System. Green Hope High School has a current enrollment of over 2,000 students, and is one of the highest performing high schools in North Carolina. After only ten years as a Wake County High School, Green Hope earned the North Carolina Honor School of Excellence designation, an honor that only a few high schools in North Carolina have achieved.

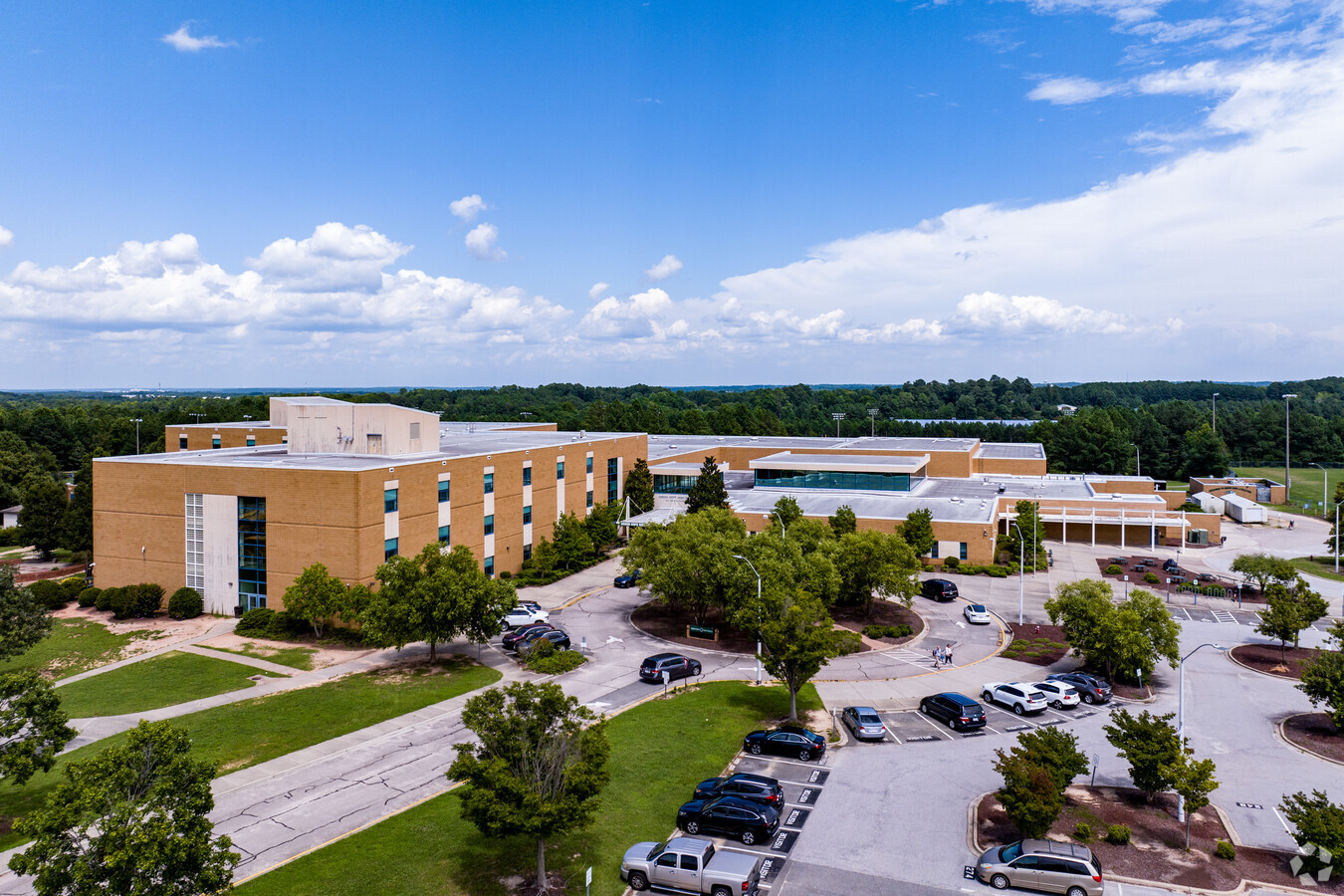
Drone View of Green Hope High School

== History ==
=== Green Hope School origins ===
The historic Green Hope School was established in 1927 and was the first accredited rural high school in Wake County, serving 200 students in grades 1 through 12. In 1952, it was renamed Green Hope Elementary School when the higher grades were reallocated to nearby Cary or Apex High Schools.

On August 15, 1963, at 1 AM, the old school caught fire and was never rebuilt, much to the dismay of the students. The scoreboard from the old Green Hope School is still present in the modern-day Green Hope High School main gym.

=== Green Hope High School today ===
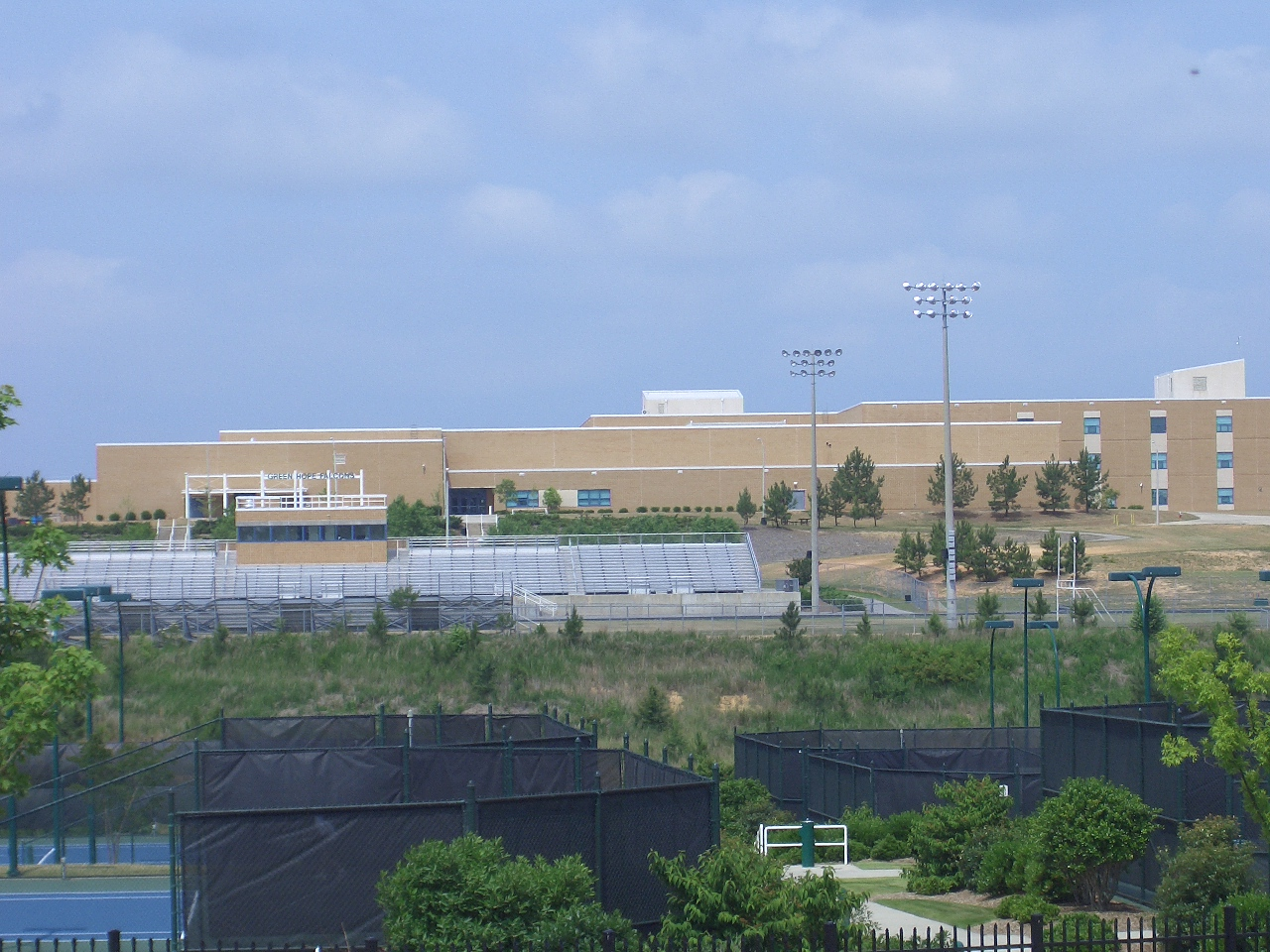
The rear of the school, as seen from the Elementary School campus. The football field is visible below the school.

The current Green Hope High School opened in 1999. The present campus is about a mile away, across the road from the old building site. It retained the name of the former school after lobbying by alumni.

It first opened for freshmen and sophomore students from neighboring overcrowded schools. It added a grade level for the two subsequent years and graduated its first senior class in 2002.

The school consists of a main three-story building, with additional modular classrooms adjacent. The Cary Tennis Park, operated by the town of Cary, which functions as the school's tennis practice facility, is located directly behind the school. Green Hope Elementary School and Park are located directly across the street from the Tennis Park. Both schools are operated by Wake County Public School System.

Jim Hedrick became principal of Green Hope circa 2005, and served there until 2014, when he became principal of Athens Drive High School. The Green Hope school community paid tribute to him after he died on August 2, 2016.

Karen Summers became principal in 2014. In 2019 she became the principal of Green Level High School. Dr. Diann Kearny served as interim principal for the remainder of the school year. Dr. Camille Hedrick served as principal beginning in 2019 and retired in 2022. Alison Cleveland has served as principal since the 2022–23 school year.

== Student demographics ==
As of the 2022-2023 school year, Green Hope had 2,001 students, with 52% of the students being male and 48% being female. Of those students, 48.6% are White, 35.9% Asian, 6.3% Hispanic, 5.9% Black, 2.9% two or more races, 0.2% Native Hawaiian/Pacific Islander, and 0.1% Native American. The total minority enrollment is 51.4%.

8% of the students are economically disadvantaged, with 7% being eligible for free lunches and 1% eligible for the reduced-price lunch program.

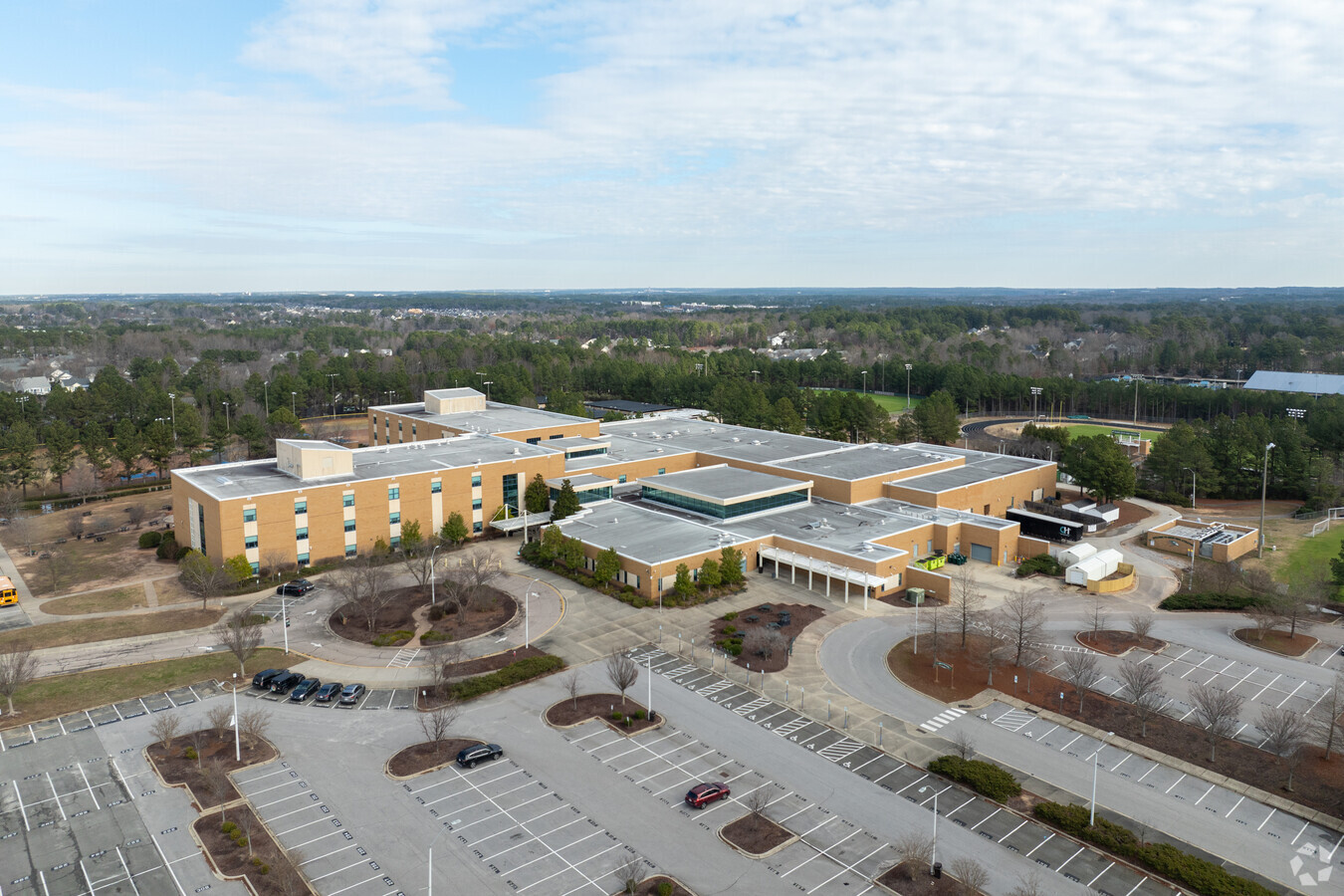
Elevated View of Green Hope High School

>95% of Green Hope High School students graduate and receive a high school diploma.

== Faculty ==
As of the 2022-23 school year, Green Hope had 101.20 full-time equivalent teachers, for a student-to-teacher ratio of 19.77:1.

Additionally, as of the 2024-25 school year, Green Hope has 32 National Board Professional Certified Teachers.

== Academics ==
=== Curriculum ===
The school includes grades 9 through 12. Green Hope offers 27 Advanced Placement® courses. 76% of the students take AP® courses, with 62% passing one or more exams. 66% of the student take the SAT test, with an average score of 1284.

GreatSchools gave Green Hope its College Success Award—Gold in 2019, 2020, and 2021 "for its track record in helping students enroll and succeed in college." 78% of graduates pursue either college or vocational training.

=== Rankings ===
U.S. News & World Report ranks Green Hope as #3 in Wake County, #4 in Raleigh, NC Metro Area High Schools, #16 public high school in North Carolina, #324 in STEM High Schools, and #523 in the United States. Niche scores the school at an A+ with a rank of #12 amongst public and private high schools in North Carolina.

The school posted the fifth-highest average SAT score in the Raleigh Durham area: 1699 with 94.7% of students taking the test.

=== Academic honors ===
Students with specific grade point averages can join the Beta Club, Quill and Scroll, and the National Honor Society. There are also the Math Honor Society, Tri-M Music Honor Society, the National Art Honor Society, the National English Honor Society, the National Psychology Honor Society, the National Social Studies Honor Society, National Technical Honor Society, Science National Honor Society, Mu Alpha Theta and the Spanish Honor Society for students who demonstrate excellence in corresponding areas of study to join.

== Student life ==
=== Clubs and organizations ===
Green Hope has academic competitive teams including Model United Nations, the History and Geography Club, the Science Bowl, Envirothon, Mock Trial, Science Olympiad, and more. The Green Hope High School band program includes a concert band, a jazz ensemble, the marching band, the percussion ensemble, the symphonic band, the wind ensemble, the winter guard, and the winter indoor percussion ensemble. The orchestra program includes a chamber orchestra, a concert orchestra, and a symphony orchestra. Green Hope also provides various honor roll opportunities, including chapters of National Honor Society, National Technical Honor Society, National Art Honor Society, and more. Other student organizations include Chorus, DECA (organization), HOSA (organization), Future Business Leaders of America, SkillsUSA, Amnesty International, Student Council, Student Ambassadors, and more.

=== Publications ===
The student yearbook is named The Talon. The school's online newspaper is called The Green Hope Falcon, which was recognized as a Distinguished Site by the "Best of SNO" (Student News Online) in 2023-24, 2024-2025, and 2025-2026.

== Athletics ==
=== Mascot and colors ===
Green Hope High School is a member of the North Carolina High School Athletic Association (NCHSAA) and are classified as a 8A school. The school is a part of the Quad City Seven 8A Conference. The mascot is the Green Hope Falcon. The school's colors are burgundy and green—the same as that of the predecessor institution.

=== Sports teams ===
The school has the following co-ed sports teams: varsity cheerleading, junior varsity cheerleading, cross country, indoor track, swim and dive, and track and field. Sport teams for women include varsity basketball, junior varsity basketball, golf, gymnastics, lacrosse, junior varsity lacrosse, varsity soccer, junior varsity soccer, varsity softball, junior varsity softball, stunt, tennis, varsity volleyball, junior varsity volleyball, and varsity wrestling. Men's sport teams include varsity baseball, junior varsity baseball, basketball, junior varsity basketball, varsity football, junior varsity football, golf, lacrosse, junior varsity lacrosse, varsity soccer, junior varsity soccer, varsity tennis, and wrestling.

Non-NCHSAA/Independent and club sports include bowling, dance team, men's ultimate frisbee (sanctioned by USA Ultimate), and women's ultimate frisbee (sanctioned by USA Ultimate).

=== Cross Country ===
Green Hope's cross country team was featured in a 2008 USA Today article for having more than 200 members. Green Hope won six straight women's cross country NCHSAA 4A Championships from 2009 to 2014, and the men's team won three 4A state championships in 2010, 2017, and 2022.

=== Soccer ===
Both the men's and women's soccer programs are perennial state contenders. At the end of the 2012 season, the men's team was ranked #1 in the nation, winning both state and national championship honors. The 2013 women's state championship team was also ranked #1 in the country.

Stephen Bickford was voted the Adidas/USA Today national player of the year in 2004, in addition to winning the state player of the year title.

=== Wells Fargo State Cup ===
Green Hope won the Wells Fargo State Cup (formerly Wachovia Cup) from the NCHSAA for having the state's "best overall interscholastic athletic performance" in the 4A classification (North Carolina's former highest classification for high school athletics) in 2009–10, 2010–11, 2011–12, 2012–13, 2013–14, 2014–15, 2015–16, and 2017–18.

=== State Championships ===
NCHSAA State Championships
Sport	Year(s)
Men's Cross Country	2010 (4A), 2017 (4A), 2022 (4A)
Men's Cross Country	2009 (4A), 2010 (4A), 2011 (4A), 2012 (4A), 2013 (4A), 2014 (4A)
Men's Golf	2003 (4A), 2006 (4A), 2007 (4A), 2009 (4A), 2010 (4A)
Women's Golf	2000 (All Classes), 2003 (4A), 2014 (4A)
Men's Indoor Track & Field	2016 (4A), 2018 (4A)
Women's Lacrosse	2013 (All Classes)
Men's Soccer	2011 (4A), 2012 (4A), 2016 (4A), 2018 (4A)
Women's Soccer	2003 (4A), 2005 (4A), 2013 (4A)
Men's Swimming & Diving	2013 (4A), 2014 (4A), 2018 (4A), 2019 (4A), 2020 (4A), 2021 (4A), 2022 (4A)
Women's Swimming & Diving	2020 (4A)
Men's Tennis	2019 (4A)
Women's Tennis	2017 (4A), 2018 (4A), 2019 (4A)
Men's Outdoor Track & Field	2018 (4A)
Volleyball	2016 (4A), 2017 (4A), 2018 (4A), 2019 (4A)

== Notable alumni ==
- Jordyn Adams, MLB outfielder
- Casey Cole, Franciscan friar, Roman Catholic priest, author, and YouTuber
- Héctor Cotto, Olympic track hurdler, represented Puerto Rico at the 2008 Summer Olympics and 2012 Summer Olympics
- Chris Flemmings, professional basketball player
- Ben Kohles, professional golfer on PGA Tour
- Max Povse, MLB pitcher
- Mitch Spence, MLB pitcher
- Brendon Todd, professional golfer on PGA Tour
- Curtis Waters, recording artist
- Blake Watson, NFL running back
