= William Thomas O'Brien House =

Historic house in North Carolina, United States

- U.S. National Register of Historic Places
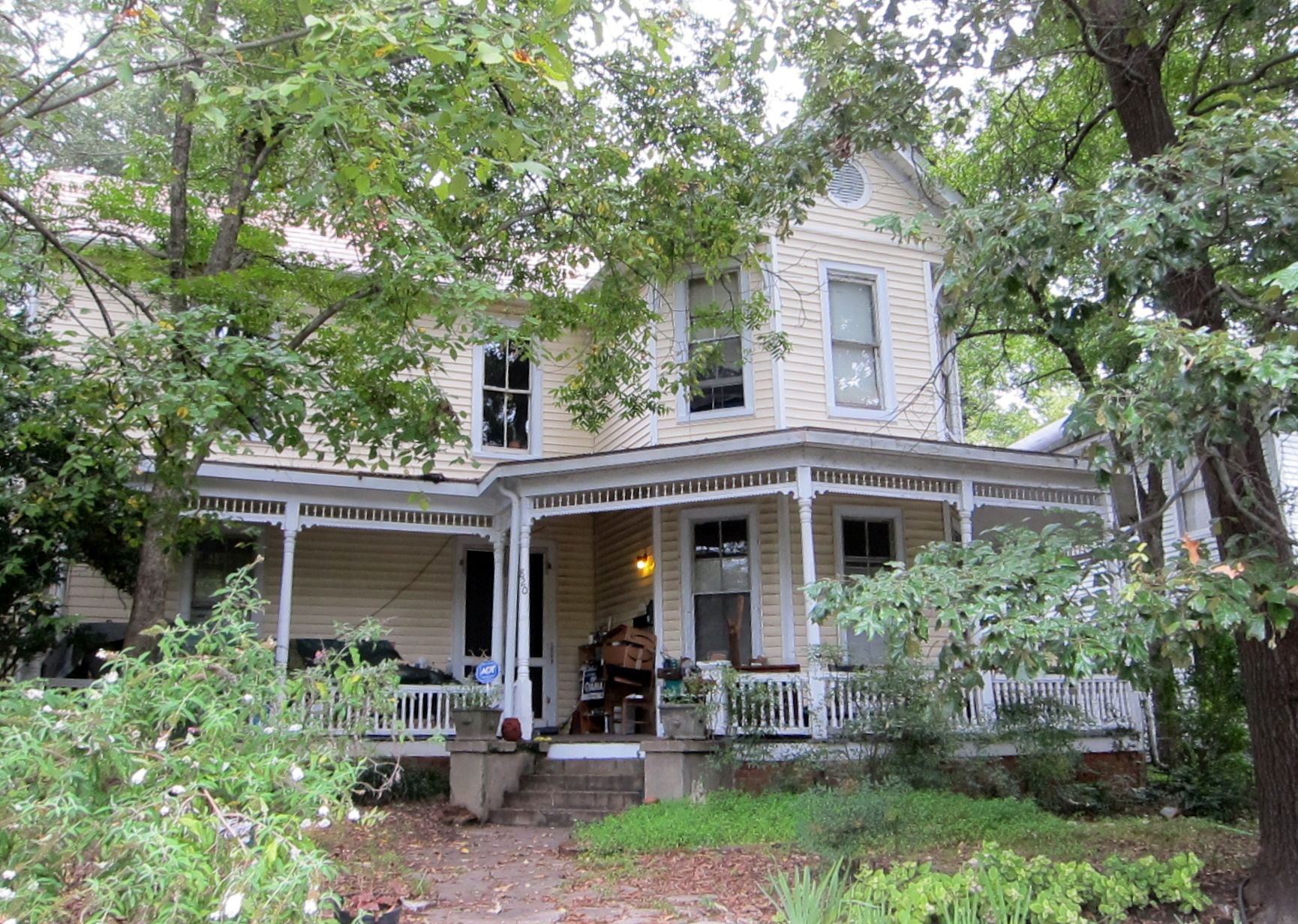

- Location within North Carolina Location within the United States
- Location: 820 Wilkerson Ave. Durham, North Carolina
- Coordinates: 36°0′6″N 78°54′55″W
- Area: less than one acre
- Built: c. 1890
- Architectural style: Gothic, Vernacular Victorian
- MPS: Durham MRA
- NRHP reference No.: 85001777
- Added to NRHP: August 9, 1985

William Thomas O'Brien House is a historic home in Durham, North Carolina. It was built about 1890, and is a two-story, Gothic Revival style frame dwelling. It has a center hall plan and features a one-story wraparound porch, an original embossed tin shingle roof, and projecting bays. It was the home of William Thomas O'Brien, who perfected the Bonsack machine for the W. Duke Sons & Company. The house originally sat on a large tract of land that extended to Rome Street. The property included a servants' house, a smokehouse, and a chicken coop.

The house, located down the street from Immaculate Conception Catholic Church and Immaculata Catholic School, played a significant role in Durham's Catholic community. O'Brien, who was Catholic, invited a priest to perform masses in the home until Immaculate Conception was constructed in 1906 on West Chapel Hill Street, on land that O'Brien deeded to the Church. After O'Brien's death in 1907, his wife moved to South Duke Street. In 1919, a carpenter and interior decorator named Edward J. Long lived in the house.

It is in the Burch Avenue Historic District and was listed on the National Register of Historic Places in 1985.
