= Immaculate Conception Catholic Church (Durham, North Carolina) =

Catholic parish and school in Durham, North Carolina

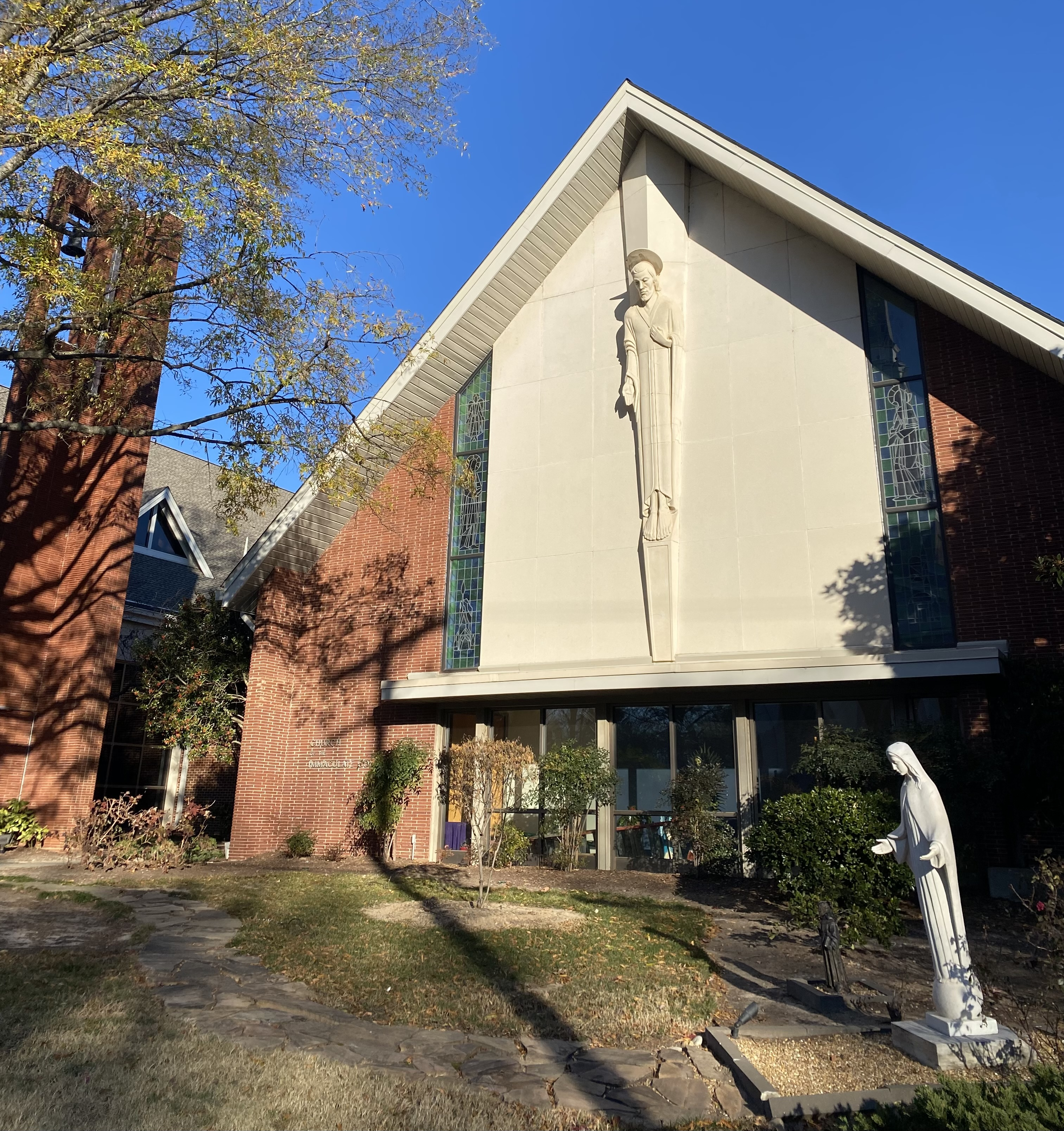
- Immaculate Conception Church in 2024

Religion
- Affiliation: Catholic Church
- Diocese: Diocese of Raleigh
- Leadership: Bishop Luis R. Zarama
- Year consecrated: 1906
- Status: Active

Location
- Location: 820 W Chapel Hill Street; Durham, North Carolina, United States

Architecture
- Completed: 1956

Website
- icdurham.org

Immaculate Conception Catholic Church & Immaculata Catholic School are a Catholic parish church and parochial school run by the Order of Friars Minor in downtown Durham, North Carolina. The church and school are located in the Burch Avenue Historic District. Immaculate Conception is the oldest Catholic congregation in Durham, and the affiliated school was the city's first Catholic school.

== Church ==
The Catholic community in Durham formed in 1867, when a group of Catholics from Lockhaven, Pennsylvania settled on land in the area.

Prior to the construction of the first church building, Catholics in Durham celebrated mass with visiting priests from Raleigh and Newton Grove at the William Thomas O'Brien House and at the home of James Lawrence. The O'Brien family were an affluent Catholic family connected to the W. Duke Sons & Company. Later, a space was rented in J.R. Gooch's store on Corcoran Street which led to protests because laws prevented liquor from being sold in close proximity to a church. In 1896, Abbot Leo Haid of Belmont Abbey, the Vicar Apostolic of North Carolina, asked Benjamin Newton Duke for financial assistance to build a church, but Duke declined. Later that year, Fr. Prendergast of Raleigh was celebrating mass at the Durham YMCA.

The first church, a white wooden church named St. Mary's, was built in 1906 on West Chapel Hill Street, located on land once owned by William T. O'Brien. A parochial school was established in 1909. The church was consecrated on January 14, 1906, with 106 members.

== School ==
The first school, called St. Mary's School, was built adjacent to the sanctuary on Chapel Hill Street. The school was founded in 1909 by Fr. Francis O'Brien and the Sisters of St. Dominic from Newburgh, New York. St. Mary's enrollment started with nine students and ended with twenty-three in its first year. The school building was torn down and a new building was constructed in the 1951. The school was later renamed St. William's School and, finally, Immaculata School.

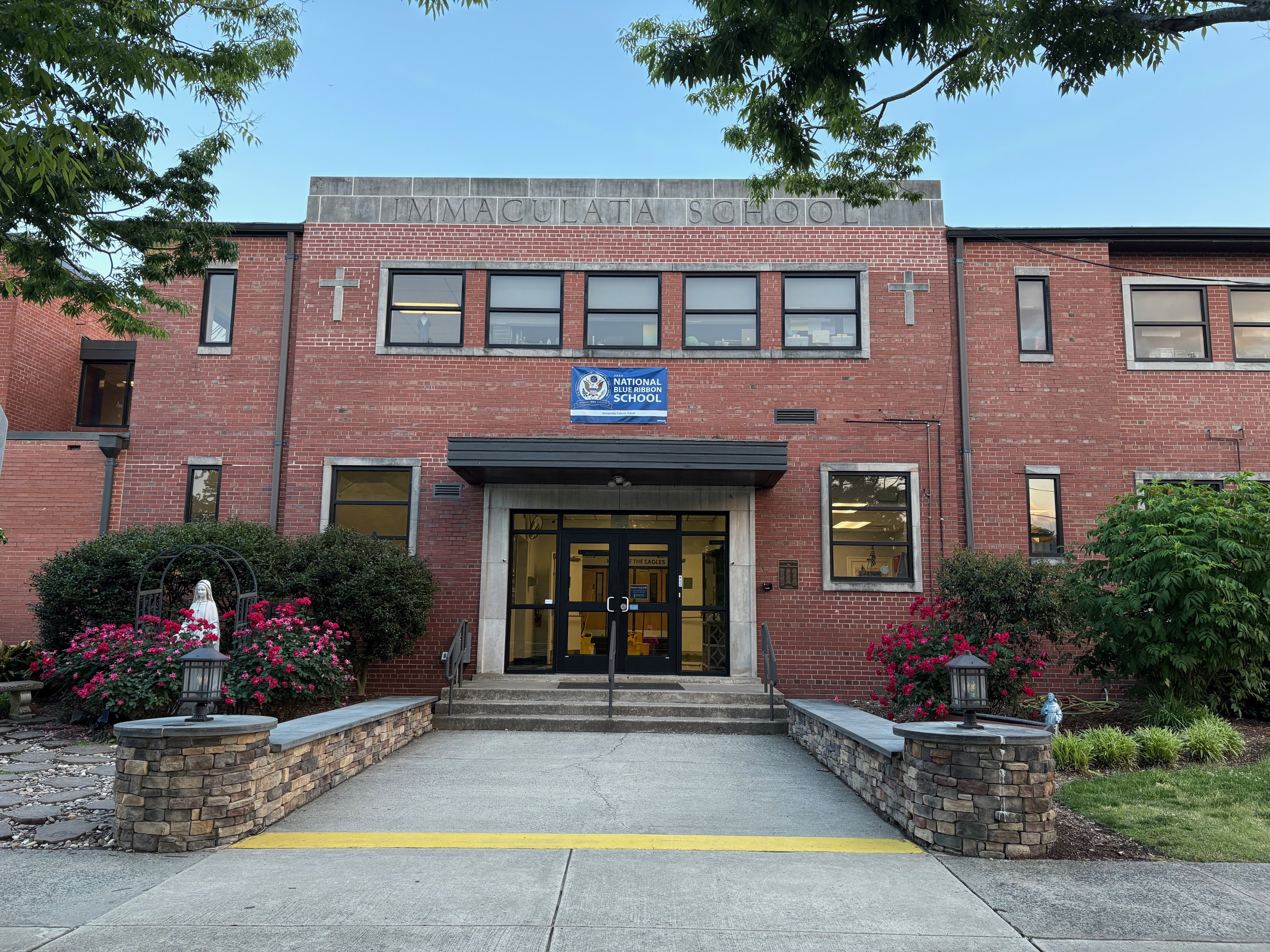
Immaculata Catholic School in 2025

In 2012, the U.S. Department of Education designated Immaculata Catholic School as a national blue ribbon school for academic achievements. In 2019, the school received a national green ribbon school award from the department of education for efforts to reduce environmental impact. The school was the first in North Carolina to receive AdvancED STEM certification.

=== Notable alumni ===
- Vernetta Alston, American politician and member of the North Carolina House of Representatives

== Notable clergy ==
- Casey Cole, Catholic priest, Franciscan friar, and internet celebrity
