= Museum of Durham History =

History museum in Durham, North Carolina

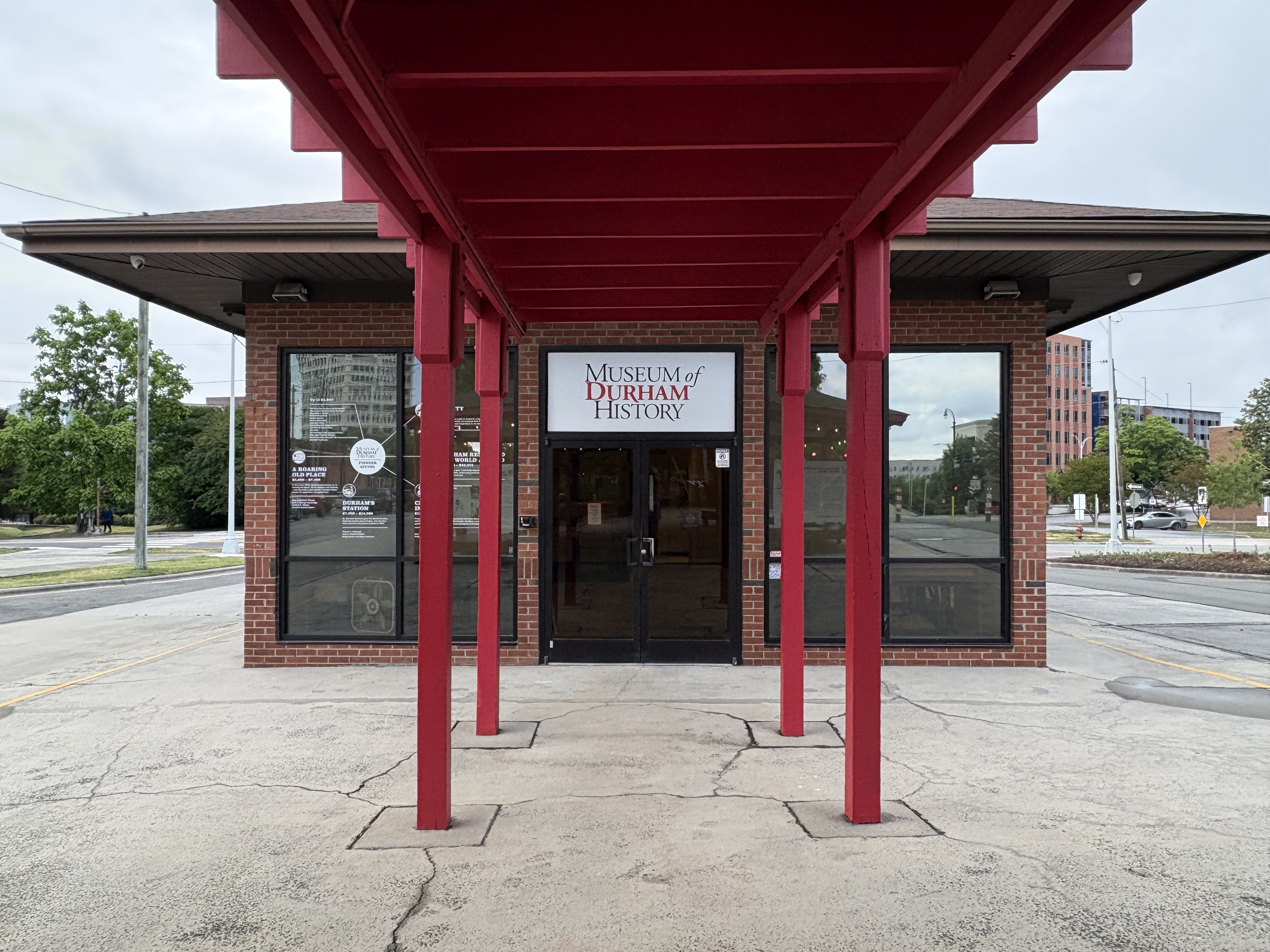
- The museum in 2026

General information
- Type: History museum
- Location: 500 W Main Street; Durham, North Carolina, U.S.
- Coordinates: 35°59′54″N 78°54′18″W
- Opened: 2013

Website
- www.museumofdurhamhistory.org

The Museum of Durham History is a history museum in downtown Durham, North Carolina. The building was formerly a railroad and bus depot.

== History ==
The museum's building originally served as a railroad and bus depot on West Main Street in downtown Durham until it was converted into a history museum in 2013. MaryAnn Black and Ruth Cooper Dzau, the wife of Victor Dzau, were instrumental in establishing the museum.

The museum highlights various points of the city's past, including the rise of Black Wall Street, the late 1800s and the construction of the Hill Building in the 1930s, the growth of the city's Latino community, and the origins of Durham's LGBTQ rights movement including the Little River attacks and subsequent protests. The museum has also documented the railway boom, racial integration of Durham Public Schools, and the football rivalry between North Carolina Central University and North Carolina A&T State University.

There is also a children's space, called the A to Z exhibit. The History Groves exhibit adds plaques and benches around Durham that are dedicated to local historical figures.
