= Larry Hall (politician) =

American politician from North Carolina

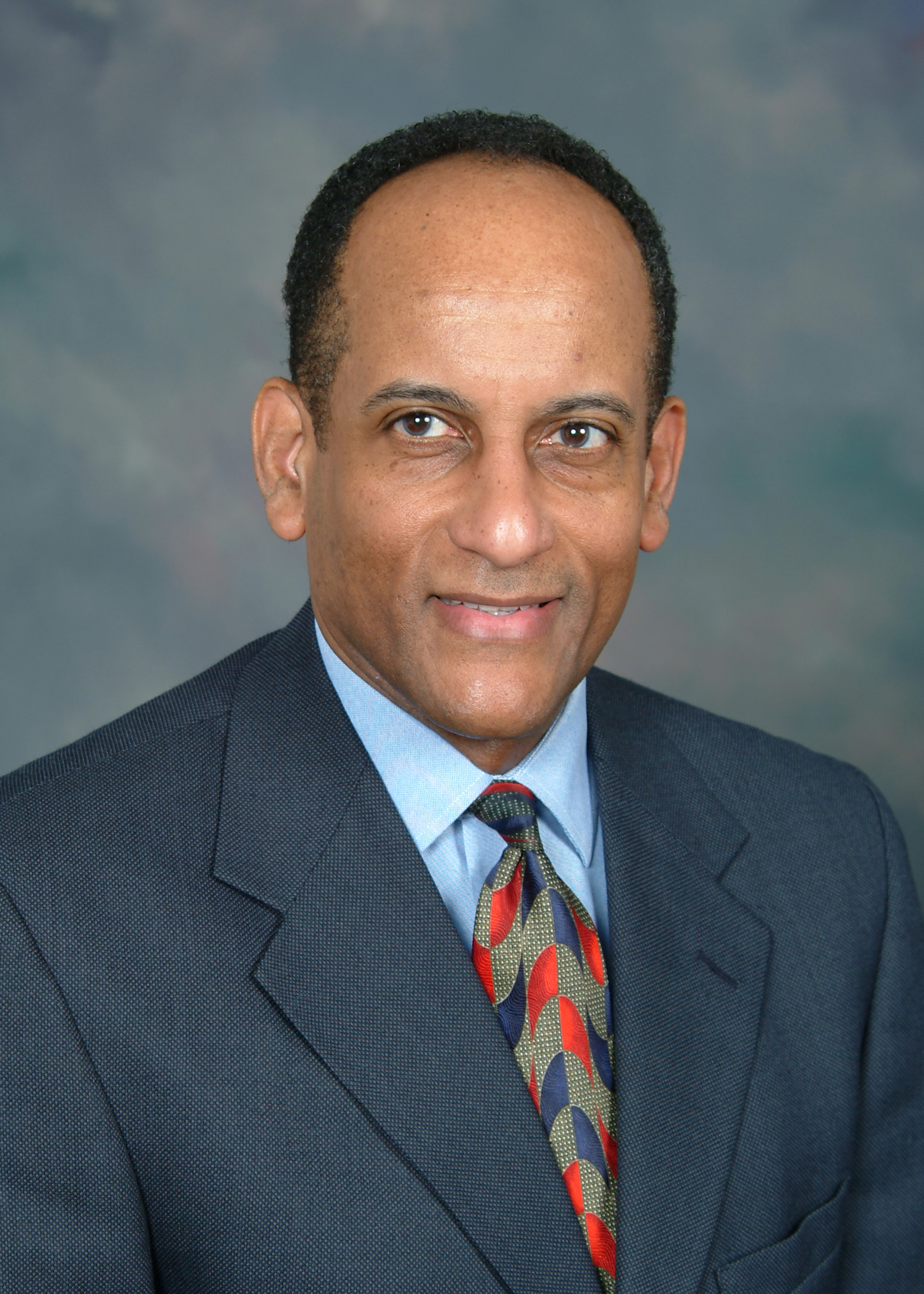

Secretary of the North Carolina Department of Military and Veterans Affairs
- In office January 11, 2017 – January 14, 2021
- Governor: Roy Cooper
- Preceded by: Cornell A. Wilson Jr.
- Succeeded by: Walter Gaskin

Minority Leader of the North Carolina House of Representatives
- In office January 1, 2013 – January 11, 2017
- Preceded by: Joe Hackney
- Succeeded by: Darren Jackson

Member of the North Carolina House of Representatives from the 29th district
- In office July 11, 2006 – January 11, 2017
- Preceded by: Paul Miller
- Succeeded by: MaryAnn Black

Personal details
- Born: Larry Dwight Hall; September 18, 1955 (age 70)
- Party: Democratic
- Education: North Carolina Central University; Johnson C. Smith University (BS); University of North Carolina, Chapel Hill (JD)
- Website: Official website

Larry Dwight Hall (born September 18, 1955) is an American politician. A longtime member of the North Carolina House of Representatives, he served as Secretary of the North Carolina Department of Military and Veterans Affairs under Governor Roy Cooper from 2017 through January 2021.

A Democrat, he served in the North Carolina House of Representatives as the member from North Carolina's 29th House district, Durham, North Carolina, from 2006 through 2017. Hall was first appointed to the position in 2006 by then-Governor Mike Easley. District 29 is the home of North Carolina Central University, Duke University, Durham Technical Community College, Lincoln Community Health Center, the historic Black Wall Street, the American Tobacco Historic District, and the Durham Performing Arts Center.

Hall is chair of the North Carolina Legislative Black Caucus Scholarship Foundation and served as an officer in the United States Marine Corps.

== Biography ==
Secretary Hall represented Durham County, North Carolina's 29th District in the House of Representatives, from 2006 through 2017 and he led House Democrats from 2012 through 2017. Born and raised in his district and a student of public schools, Secretary Hall earned a B.S. with Honors in Political Science and Business from Johnson C. Smith University and a J.D. from the School of Law at The University of North Carolina at Chapel Hill. Upon undergrad graduation, he was commissioned as an Officer in the United States Marine Corps. A decorated officer, Secretary Hall served 16 years in the United States Marines and Marine Corps Reserves and served in the support of the Operations in the Middle East in Lebanon and Iran.

Hall has been awarded the Navy Achievement Medal, the Marine Corps Reserve Medal, the Armed Forces Reserve Medal, and a Meritorious Unit Citation from the United States Marine Corps. He served as a Rifle Platoon Commander, Weapons Company Executive Officer, Training Officer, Battalion Area Security Officer, Staff Judge Advocate, Communications Security Officer and Logistics Officer. Secretary Hall also served as Legal Officer and was formerly Commandant for the Marine Corps League Detachment, which assists Marines transitioning from active duty to civilian life in locating employment, housing and educational opportunities for their families.

Secretary Hall is an active member of the community. He has served as an Executive Committee Member and Economic Committee Chairman of the Durham Branch of the NAACP, as Secretary and Chairman of the Durham Business and Professional Chain, and served on the Durham Chamber of Commerce Board of Directors. He has also served as Executive Officer of the Young Marines Program, Board Chairman of the Durham Companions Mentor Program, and as an instructor and training officer teaching youth leadership, discipline, custom, courtesies, and traditions of the Marine Corps.

Secretary Hall's service to North Carolina continues to be merited, receiving the NAACP's President's Award, Equality in Legislation Leadership Award, and Excellence from the Courtroom to the Capital Community Service Award. Secretary Hall has been featured multiple times in Governing magazine and has been honored as a Champion of NC Working Families, a 100% Environmental Champion, and a Defender of Justice for his commitment to safeguarding voting rights, expanding opportunities throughout the state for individuals and communities of low incomes, and protecting vulnerable families and members of the military from predatory lending.

As House Democratic Leader, Secretary Hall served on the state's Economic Development Board, the state's Innovation Council, The North Carolina Courts Commission—Chairperson, The Duke Medical Center Advisory Board, the Homeland Security, Military, and Veterans Affairs Committee—Chairman, and has been inducted as a Toll Fellow by the National Conference of State Governments. He was elected to the Democratic Legislative Campaign Committee (DLCC) 2015 Board of Directors to devise and execute nationwide election strategy in state legislatures. Secretary Hall also is Chair of the North Carolina Legislative Black Caucus Foundation.

Secretary Hall has received many awards and recognitions, including the Outstanding Service Award from the Alliance of North Carolina Black Elected Officials, the Keeper of the Flame Award from the Durham UNCF Steering Committee, the Green Tie Award and the Joe Award from the North Carolina League of Conservation Voters, the Friend of Education Award from the North Carolina Association of Educators, the Legislative Leadership Award from Equality NC and the Political Achievement Award from the African American Caucus of the Wake County Democratic Party.

== Electoral history ==
=== 2016 ===
North Carolina House of Representatives 29th district general election, 2016
Party	Candidate	Votes	%
Democratic	Larry Hall (incumbent)	39,607	100%
Total votes		39,607	100%
Democratic hold			

=== 2014 ===
North Carolina House of Representatives 29th district general election, 2014
Party	Candidate	Votes	%
Democratic	Larry Hall (incumbent)	22,667	100%
Total votes		22,667	100%
Democratic hold			

=== 2012 ===
North Carolina House of Representatives 29th district general election, 2012
Party	Candidate	Votes	%
Democratic	Larry Hall (incumbent)	38,181	100%
Total votes		38,181	100%
Democratic hold			

=== 2010 ===
North Carolina House of Representatives 29th district general election, 2010
Party	Candidate	Votes	%
Democratic	Larry Hall (incumbent)	18,130	100%
Total votes		18,130	100%
Democratic hold			

=== 2008 ===
North Carolina House of Representatives 29th district general election, 2008
Party	Candidate	Votes	%
Democratic	Larry Hall (incumbent)	31,254	90.73%
Libertarian	Justin Lallinger	3,219	9.27%
Total votes		34,473	100%
Democratic hold			

=== 2006 ===
North Carolina House of Representatives 29th district Democratic primary election, 2006
Party	Candidate	Votes	%
Democratic	Larry Hall	2,190	29.82%
Democratic	Sandy Ogburn	1,917	26.10%
Democratic	Mary D. Jacobs	1,552	21.13%
Democratic	T. Brock Winslow	1,099	14.96%
Democratic	Angela V. Langley	586	7.98%
Total votes		7,344	100%

North Carolina House of Representatives 29th district Democratic primary run-off election, 2006
Party	Candidate	Votes	%
Democratic	Larry Hall	1,633	55.47%
Democratic	Sandy Ogburn	1,311	44.53%
Total votes		2,944	100%

North Carolina House of Representatives 29th district general election, 2006
Party	Candidate	Votes	%
Democratic	Larry Hall (incumbent)	13,295	100%
Total votes		13,295	100%
Democratic hold			

North Carolina House of Representatives
Preceded by Joe Hackney	Minority Leader of the North Carolina House of Representatives; 2013-2017	Succeeded by Darren Jackson
