= Burch Avenue Historic District =

Historic district in North Carolina, United States

- U.S. National Register of Historic Places
- U.S. Historic district
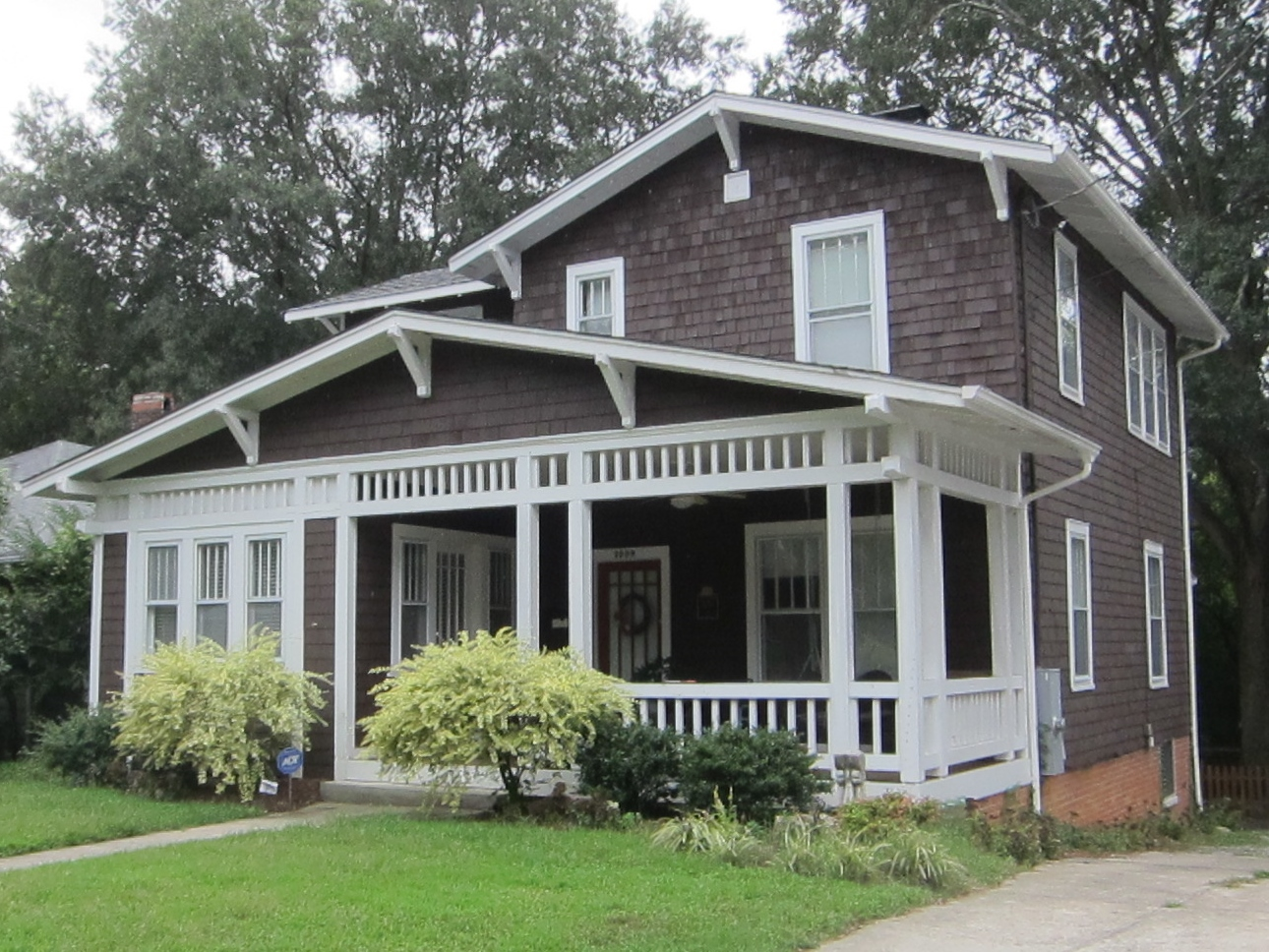

- Location within North Carolina Location within the United States
- Location: Roughly bounded by S. Buchanan Blvd., W. Chapel Hill St., Duke University Rd., Burch Ave., and Rome Ave., Durham, North Carolina
- Coordinates: 35°59′53″N 78°55′03″W
- Area: 36 acres (15 ha)
- Built: c. 1890-1960
- Architectural style: Queen Anne, Bungalow/craftsman, Colonial Revival
- MPS: Durham MRA
- NRHP reference No.: 10000631
- Added to NRHP: September 3, 2010

Burch Avenue Historic District, also known as the West End, is a national historic district located at Durham, Durham County, North Carolina, United States. The district encompasses 156 contributing buildings in a predominantly residential section of Durham. The buildings primarily date from about 1890 to 1960 and include notable examples of Queen Anne, Colonial Revival, and Bungalow / American Craftsman architecture.

It was listed on the National Register of Historic Places in 2010.

== Notable buildings ==
- Ar-Razzaq Islamic Center
- Immaculate Conception Catholic Church
- William Thomas O'Brien House
