= Casey Cole =

American Franciscan priest, writer and YouTuber

The Reverend Casey Cole OFM

Orders
- Ordination: June 22, 2019 by Luis R. Zarama

Personal details
- Born: Lansdale, Pennsylvania, U.S.
- Denomination: Roman Catholic
- Occupation: Priest, author, blogger, YouTuber
- Education: Green Hope High School; The Catholic University of America; Furman University; Catholic Theological Union

YouTube information
- Channel: Breaking In The Habit; Digital Evangelism
- Years active: 2015–present
- Genres: Evangelism; Educational
- Subscribers: 430 thousand
- Views: 54 million
- Website: breakinginthehabit.org

Casey Cole, OFM is an American Franciscan friar, Catholic priest, writer, and blogger. Cole runs his own online blog and YouTube channel called Breaking in the Habit and is the author of the books Sent: How to Evangelize Wherever You Are, Whoever You Are, Let Go: Seven Stumbling Blocks to Christian Discipleship and Called: What Happens After Saying Yes to God.

== Biography ==
=== Early life ===
Cole grew up in Lancaster, Pennsylvania, before moving to Cary, North Carolina. He was a parishioner at St. Michael the Archangel Catholic Church in Cary. Cole attended Green Hope High School and, in 2011, graduated from Furman University with a degree in religious studies and a minor in poverty studies.

In August 2011, Cole was received as a postulant in the Order of Friars Minor.

=== Career ===
Later in 2011, he began his blog called Breaking in the Habit, writing about considering joining the priesthood, later adding a podcast and a YouTube channel.

He was received as a Franciscan novice in August 2012, where, in 2013, he made his first profession with novices from seven North American provinces in Burlington, Wisconsin at the Franciscan Interprovincial Novitiate. He studied at The Catholic University of America from 2013 to 2016, working towards a master of divinity degree. In 2016, Cole began serving at Immaculate Conception Catholic Church in Durham, a Franciscan parish, and professed his final vows as a Franciscan friar in 2017. In March 2018, he was ordained a deacon.

In 2019, he received a master of divinity from Catholic Theological Union in Chicago.

On June 22, 2019, Cole was ordained a priest of the Franciscan Order by Luis R. Zarama, the Bishop of Raleigh, at Immaculate Conception Catholic Church. At Cole's insistence (wanting "the people of God in their realness to be there"), all lay liturgical ministers who assisted in the celebration of the Mass were women.

Since 2020, Cole has served as the chaplain of Mount de Sales Academy in Macon, Georgia. Starting in 2020, Casey started a YouTube channel, Upon Friar Review with fellow Franciscan friar Patrick Tuttle. The channel was deleted from YouTube in 2024.

== Writings ==
Cole has written four books:

- Sent: How to Evangelize Wherever You Are, Whoever You Are,
- Called: What Happens After Saying Yes to God,
- Let Go: Seven Stumbling Blocks to Christian Discipleship,
- The Way of Beatitude: Living Radical Hope in a World of Division and Despair.
