= Shane Atkinson (imam) =

American imam

Shane Atkinson is an American imam who serves as a chaplain at Elon University. He was previously the first Muslim chaplain in the history of University of North Carolina Medical Center.

Atkinson is a self-described “Muslim with a Southern accent who can talk about deer hunting.” Born to a Southern Baptist family in Mississippi, he was socialized in the culture of white supremacy, but began to question his learned biases and learn about other ways of life. Atkinson's story of questioning and his eventual conversion to Islam is the subject of the film Redneck Muslim, a documentary by Jennifer Taylor and Mustafa Davis.

Prior to becoming an Imam, Atkinson spent twenty years as a Board Certified Orthotic and Prosthetic Practitioner. In 2011 he was awarded an Ijaza to teach Islamic theology, law, and spirituality. Atkinson then entered the Clinical Pastoral Education program at UNC Medical Center in 2015 as the first Muslim in their Chaplains Department, and he continues to teach Clinical Pastoral Education. Atkinson has also served as an imam at As Salaam Islamic Center in Raleigh, North Carolina.
