= North Carolina Post-Conviction Review Commission =

The North Carolina Post-Conviction Review Commission, formerly the North Carolina Innocence Inquiry Commission, is an independent state agency in the U.S. state of North Carolina tasked with investigating wrongful felony convictions due to factual errors. The commission comprises eight members and a professional staff, which field claims from convicted felons seeking exoneration. The body uses an inquisitorial system of justice and has broad powers of subpoena. If the commission decides a case warrants judicial review, it is forwarded to a three-judge Superior Court panel for final adjudication.

== History ==
While I. Beverly Lake Jr. was serving as chief justice of the Supreme Court of North Carolina, a series of high-profile wrongful convictions in the state came to his attention. He reviewed several of the cases with his clerk and resolved that the criminal justice system required reform. In 2002, he convened a panel including defense attorneys, prosecutors, law enforcement officers, and legal scholars named the North Carolina Actual Innocence Commission/Criminal Justice Study Commission to study ways to reduce wrongful convictions. Afterwards it turned its focus towards identifying wrongful convictions and overturning them. Inspired by the Criminal Cases Review Commission of the United Kingdom, the commission proposed a new body which would use an inquisitorial system of justice to investigate claims of innocence. The Actual Innocence Commission proposed model legislation for their idea in March 2005. It was introduced as a bill in the North Carolina General Assembly. After some modifications, the bill creating the North Carolina Innocence Inquiry Commission was passed and signed into law by Governor Mike Easley on August 3, 2006.

Appointees were selected to begin their terms as commissioners on January 1, 2007. The commission spent the first several months of the year hiring professional staff and establishing rules and procedures. The body also began receiving appeals for relief and received early assistance from the North Carolina Center for Actual Innocence, a nonprofit organization. The commission held its first hearing in December. As of 2025, the commission has examined over 3,500 claims of innocence and made 16 referrals that resulted in exoneration. On July 7, 2026, the agency was by law renamed from the North Carolina Innocence Inquiry Commission to the North Carolina Post-Conviction Review Commission.

== Structure ==
The North Carolina Innocence Inquiry Commission is an independent state agency with its own statutory authorization and appropriation. It is the only state-supported innocence commission in the United States. The commission comprises eight voting members, which must include a Superior Court judge, a prosecutor, a practicing criminal defense attorney, a sheriff, a victim advocate, and a non-attorney citizen. The final two members of the commission do not have to meet particular qualifications. The chief justice of the Supreme Court appoints the two nonspecific members, while appointment responsibility for the other members is rotated between the chief justice and the chief judge of the North Carolina Court of Appeals.

The body has broad powers of subpoena and can compel witness testimony, grant witness immunity, and order forensic testing on physical evidence. Its proceedings are confidential and not made public unless turned over to a court for judicial review. As of 2025, the commission has a $1.6 million annual budget and 13 full-time staffers: an executive director, assistant director, associate counsel, four staff attorneys, two grant staff attorneys, a victim services program manager, two paralegals and an executive assistant. The commission can accept donations to support its work.

== Claims process ==
The commission only offers relief to persons claiming factual innocence of the crime for which they were convicted. Cases must concern living persons with North Carolina felony convictions, and priority for consideration is given to claimants who are incarcerated solely for the conviction on which they are claiming innocence. In order for the commission to take on a case, a claimant must waive their legal protections and pledge full cooperation with the body, though they are allowed to consult legal counsel during proceedings. Appealing to the commission for relief does not deprive the claimant of other avenues for relief, such as federal habeas corpus petitions. The basis for the claim of innocence must include evidence that was not previously introduced in a trial or court hearing. The commission has the authority to initially screen claims for merit and may turn away claimants at its discretion. While tasked with demonstrating innocence, the commission may uncover evidence of guilt—namely for other persons not seeking relief for the crime being reviewed—and is obligated to turn such information over to law enforcement.

Claims of innocence are investigated by the commission's staff and then referred to the commission for final review and decision. In making a decision, the commission is required by statute to examine "all relevant evidence" and conclude whether or not "there is sufficient factual evidence of innocence to merit judicial review." If the commission decides a case warrants judicial review, it is forwarded to a three-judge Superior Court panel for final adjudication. In the event a case involves a claimant who had initially entered a guilty plea for their crime, referrals to a judicial panel must be unanimous. Other decisions are made by simple majority vote. Adjudication by the judges returns to an adversarial system and allows for presentations by prosecutors and defense counsel. If the panel of judges rules unanimously that "clear and convincing evidence" demonstrates the innocence of the claimant, the charges against them are dismissed. Evidence presented to the judges must meet the standards set for all evidence admitted in regular criminal jury trials.

== Works cited ==
- Mosteller, Robert P. (September 2016). "N.C. Innocence Inquiry Commission's First Decade: Impressive Success and Lessons Learned". North Carolina Law Review. 94 (6). University of North Carolina School of Law: 1725–1870.
- Report to the 2008 Session of the General Assembly of North Carolina (PDF), Raleigh: The North Carolina Innocence Inquiry Commission, 2008
