= MaryAnn Black =

American politician and social worker (1943–2020)

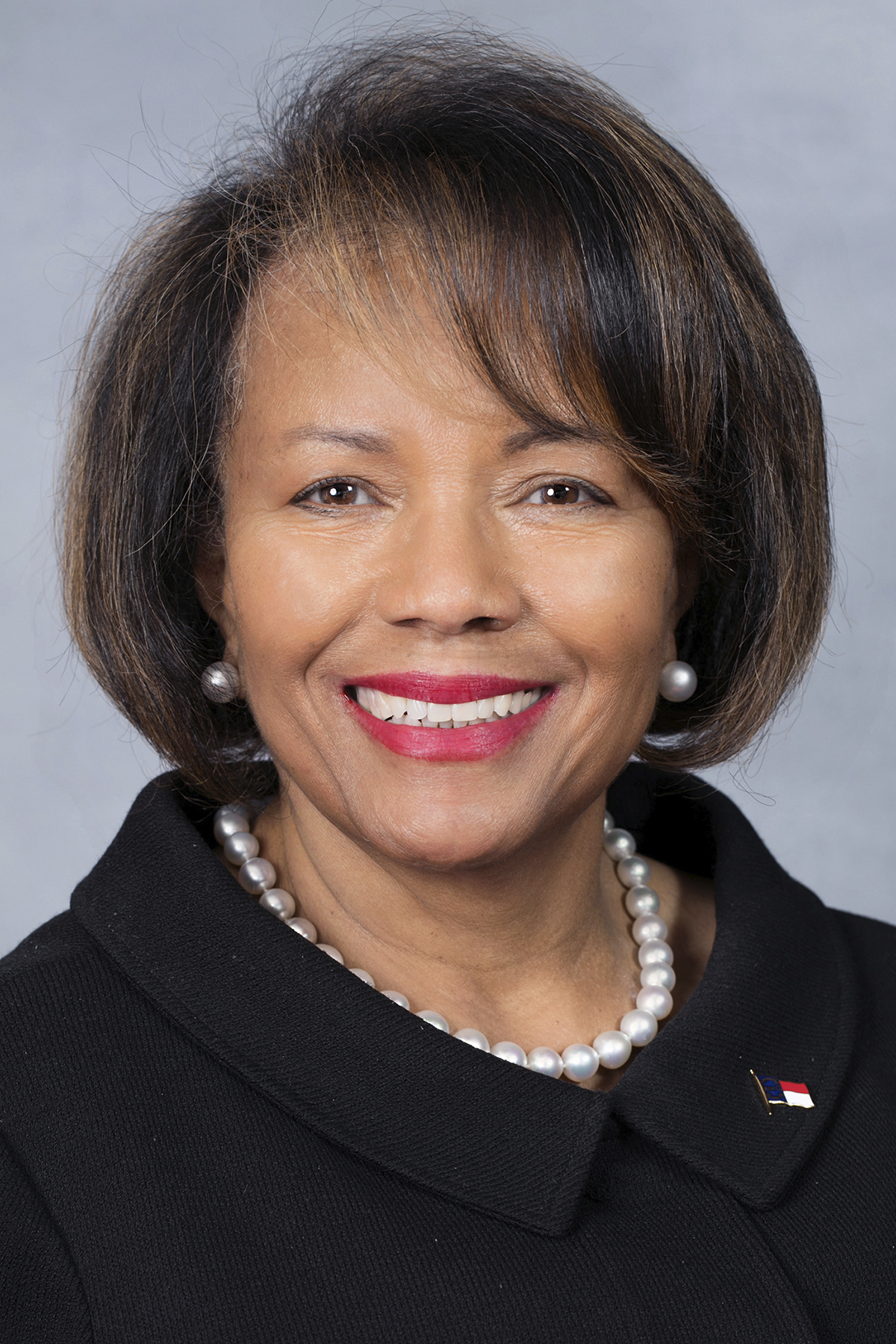

Member of the North Carolina House of Representatives from the 29th district
- In office February 15, 2017 – March 26, 2020
- Preceded by: Larry Hall
- Succeeded by: Vernetta Alston

Personal details
- Born: MaryAnn Eaddy; October 3, 1943 New York City, U.S.
- Died: March 25, 2020 (aged 76) Durham, North Carolina, U.S.
- Party: Democratic
- Education: Benedict College; University of North Carolina at Chapel Hill
- Occupation: social worker

MaryAnn Eaddy Black (October 3, 1943 – March 25, 2020) was an American clinical social worker and politician.

Black was born in Manhattan in New York City. She moved with her family to Florence, South Carolina, and graduated from Wilson High School. She received her bachelor's degree in English from Benedict College and master's degree in social work from University of North Carolina at Chapel Hill. Black lived in Durham, North Carolina, and was a clinical social worker. Black served on the Durham County Board of Commissioners from 1990 to 2002 and was chair of the county board (1996-2002).

In 2017, Black was appointed as a Democrat to the North Carolina House of Representatives by governor Roy Cooper and served until her death in 2020 at age 76. She was not seeking re-election to the North Carolina General Assembly. Black was undergoing treatment for cancer when she died her home in Durham, North Carolina, on March 25, 2020.

== Notes ==
North Carolina House of Representatives
| Preceded by Larry Hall | Member of the North Carolina House of Representatives from the 29th district 2017-2020 | Succeeded by Vernetta Alston |
